= Train shed =

Roofed railway tracks and platforms

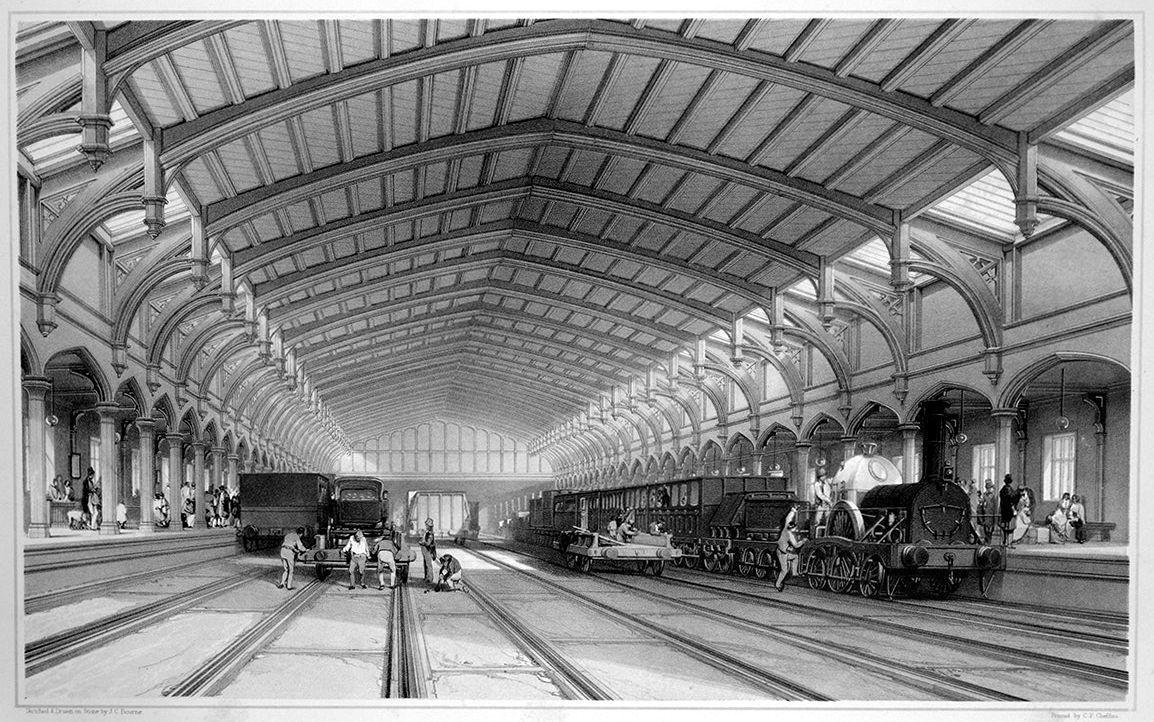
Inside Isambard Kingdom Brunel's wooden train shed at Bristol Temple Meads

A train shed is a building adjacent to a station building where the tracks and platforms of a railway station are covered by a roof. It is also known as an overall roof. It should not be confused with a carriage shed, whose primary purpose is to store and protect from the elements train cars not in use.

The first train shed was built in 1830 at Liverpool's Crown Street station.

The biggest train sheds were often built as an arch of glass and iron, while the smaller were built as normal pitched roofs.

The train shed with the biggest single span ever built was that at the second Philadelphia Broad Street station, built in 1891.

== Types of train shed ==
=== Early wooden train sheds ===
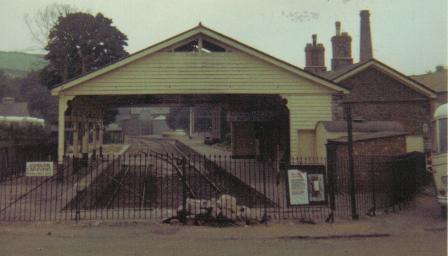
Ashburton railway station, in Devon, England (now closed)

The earliest train sheds were wooden structures, often with unglazed openings to allow smoke and steam to escape. The oldest part of Bristol Temple Meads is a particularly fine – and large – example, designed by Isambard Kingdom Brunel with mock-hammerbeam roof.

Surviving examples include:

- Ashburton, Devon, England (station closed)
- Bo'ness, Falkirk, Scotland
- Frome, Somerset, England
- Kingswear, Devon, England
- Thurso, Highland, Scotland
- Wick, Highland, Scotland.

=== Classic metal and glass ===
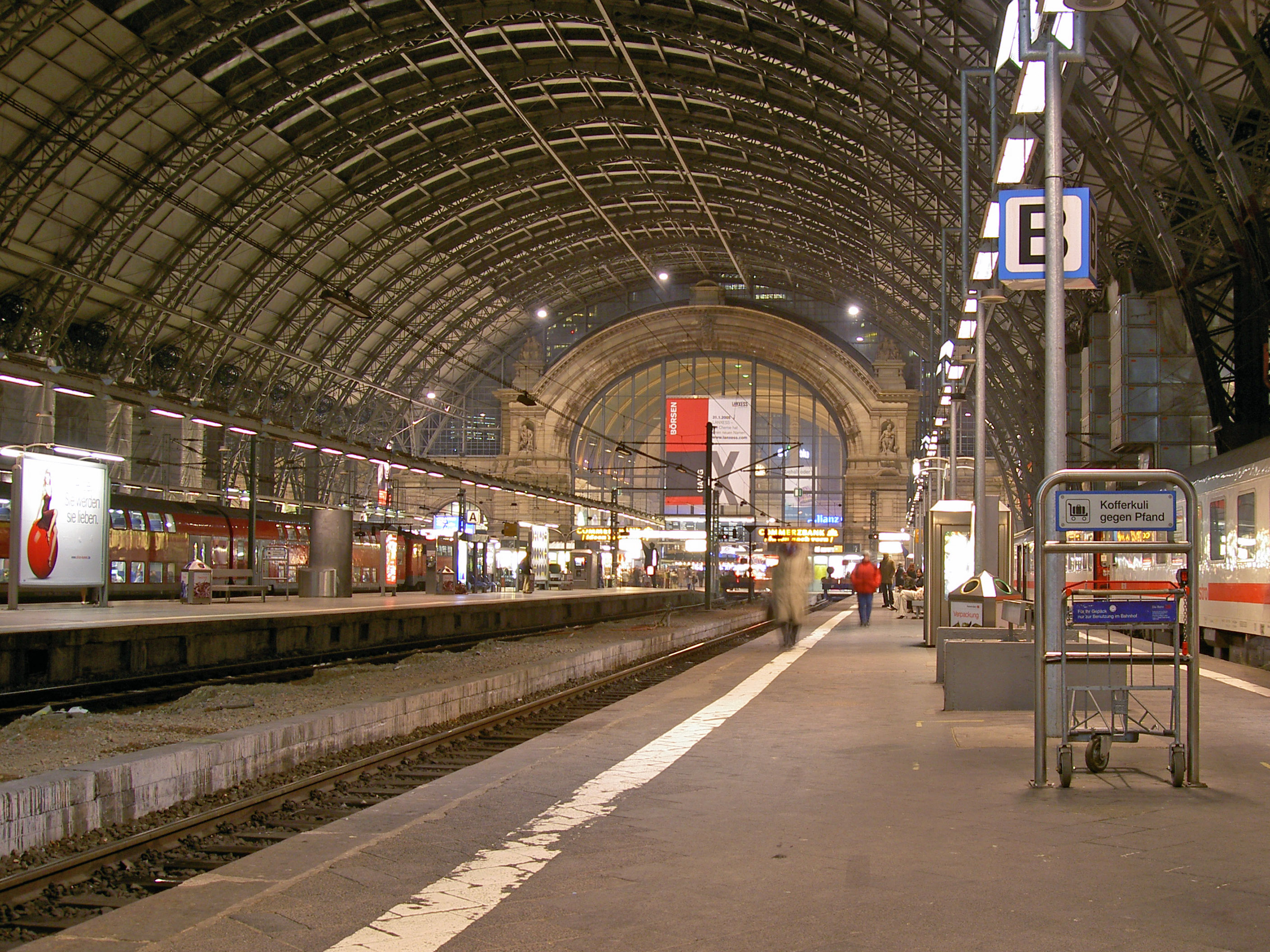
Frankfurt, Germany

The middle of the nineteenth century saw many large stations covered by iron, steel and glass train sheds, inspired by The Crystal Palace at The Great Exhibition in 1851. The best have been described as "like cathedrals" and feature curved roofs; other structures have pitched roofs.

Surviving examples of curved roof train sheds include:

- Amsterdam Centraal, Netherlands
- Antwerpen-Centraal, Belgium
- Bath Green Park railway station, Somerset, England (converted to covered market and car park)

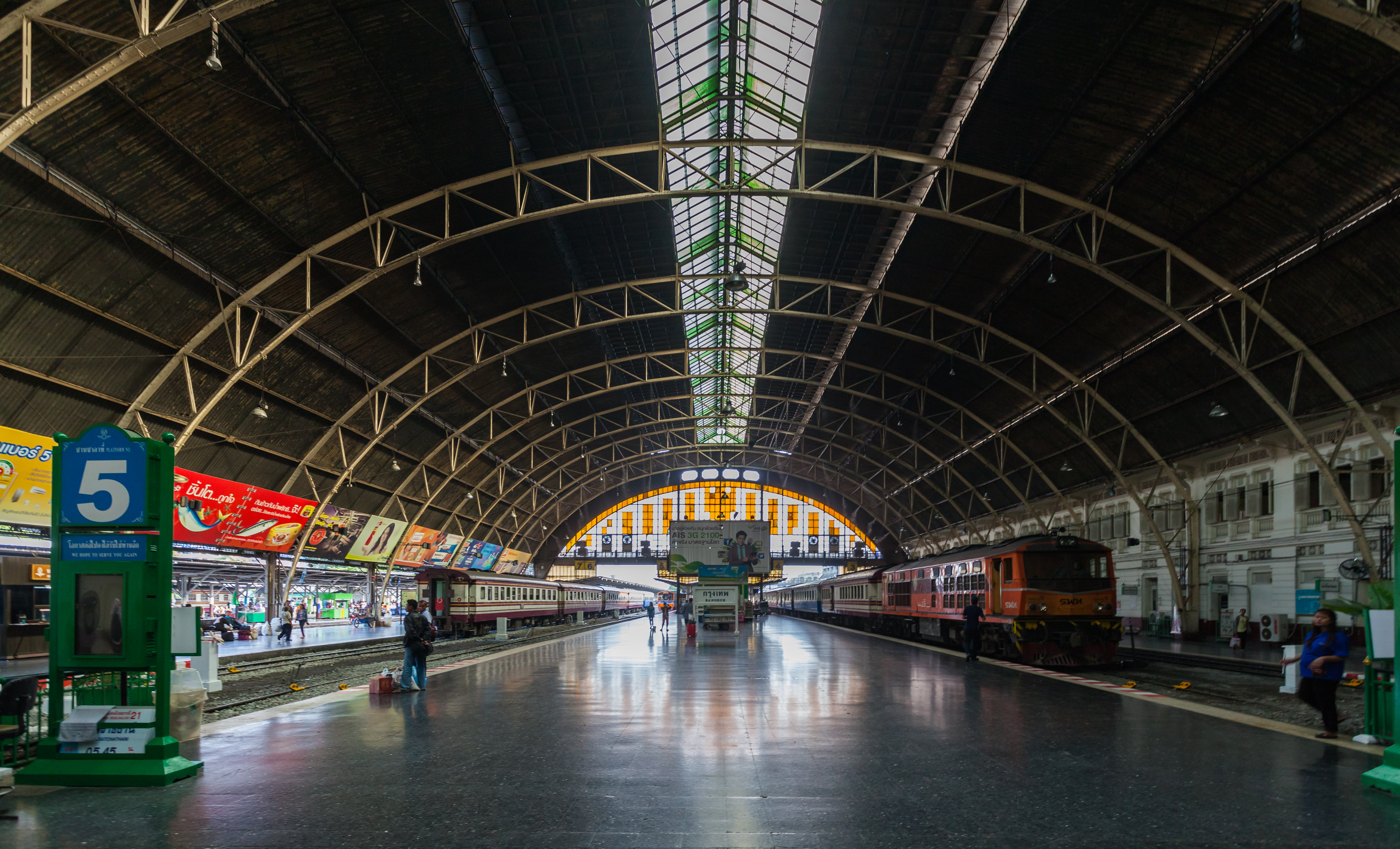
Bangkok, Thailand

- Bangkok, Thailand
- Barcelona Estació de França, Catalonia, Spain
- Brighton, East Sussex, England
- Bristol Temple Meads, England
- Buenos Aires Retiro, Argentina
- Copenhagen Central Station, Denmark
- Darlington railway station, County Durham, England
- Frankfurt (Main) Hauptbahnhof, Germany
- Glasgow Queen Street, Scotland
- Hull Paragon, East Riding of Yorkshire, England
- Gare de Lille Flandres, France
- Köln Hauptbahnhof, Germany
- Leipzig Hauptbahnhof, Germany
- Liverpool Lime Street, Merseyside, England
- London Kings Cross, England
- London Paddington, England
- London St Pancras, England

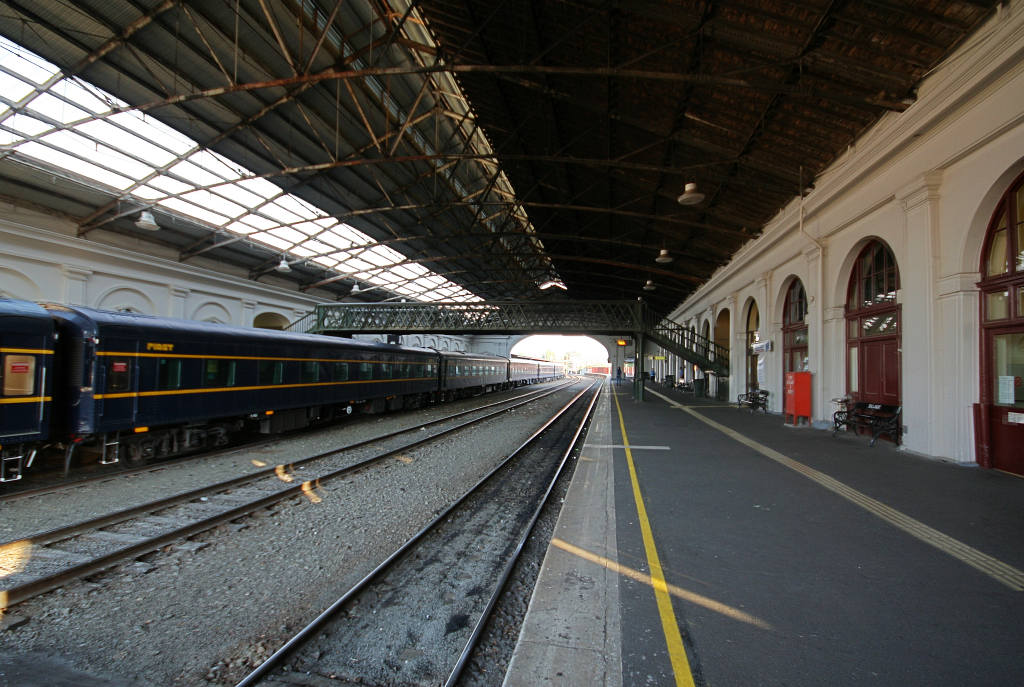
Ballarat, in Victoria, Australia

- Madrid Atocha, Spain (converted to station atrium)
- Manchester Central, Greater Manchester, England (converted to conference centre)
- Manchester Piccadilly, Greater Manchester, England
- Milano Centrale, Italy

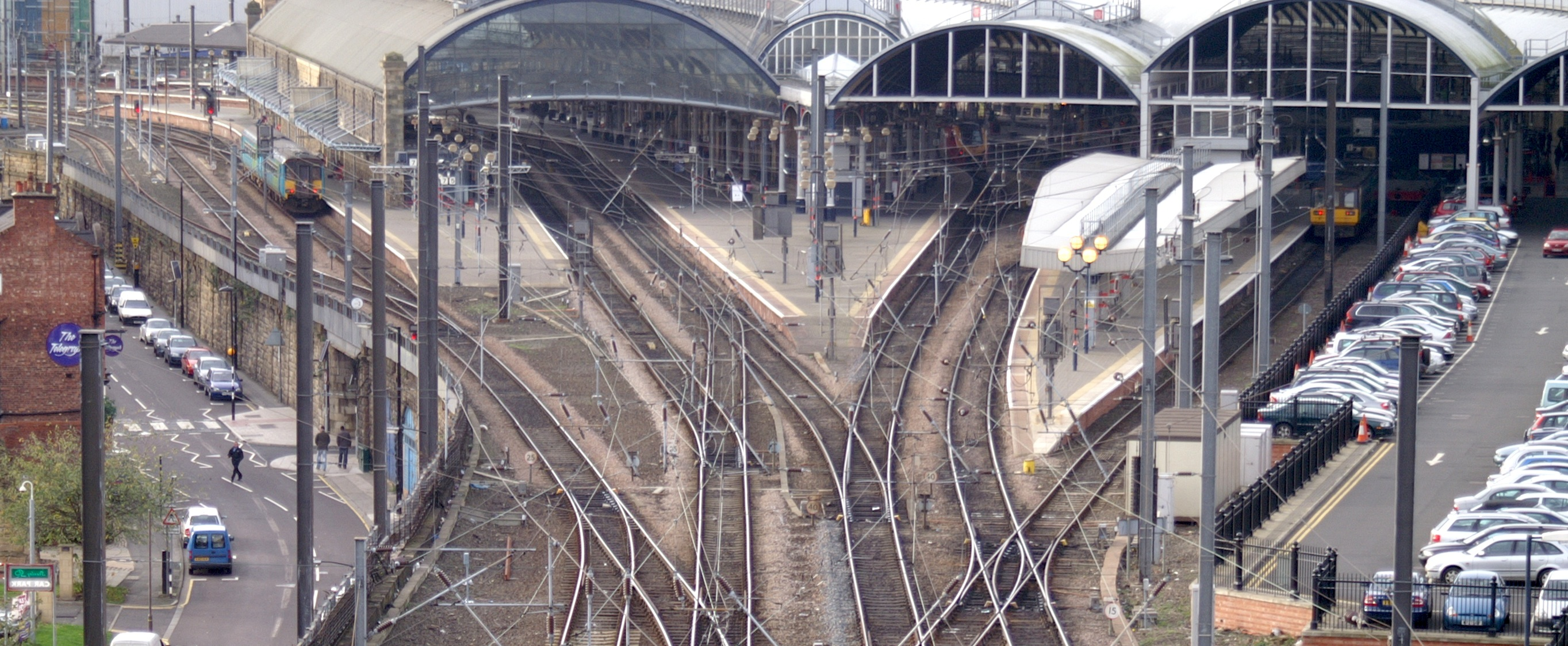
Newcastle, Tyne & Wear, England

- Newcastle Central, Tyne & Wear, England
- Prague Main Station, Czech Republic
- Reading Terminal, Philadelphia, United States (converted to convention center)
- Tanjung Priok, Jakarta, Indonesia
- York, North Yorkshire, England
- Vitebsky railway station, Saint Petersburg, Russia
- Lviv railway station, Ukraine

Surviving examples of pitched roof train sheds include:

- Ballarat, Geelong (and No 2 Goods Shed Melbourne), Australia

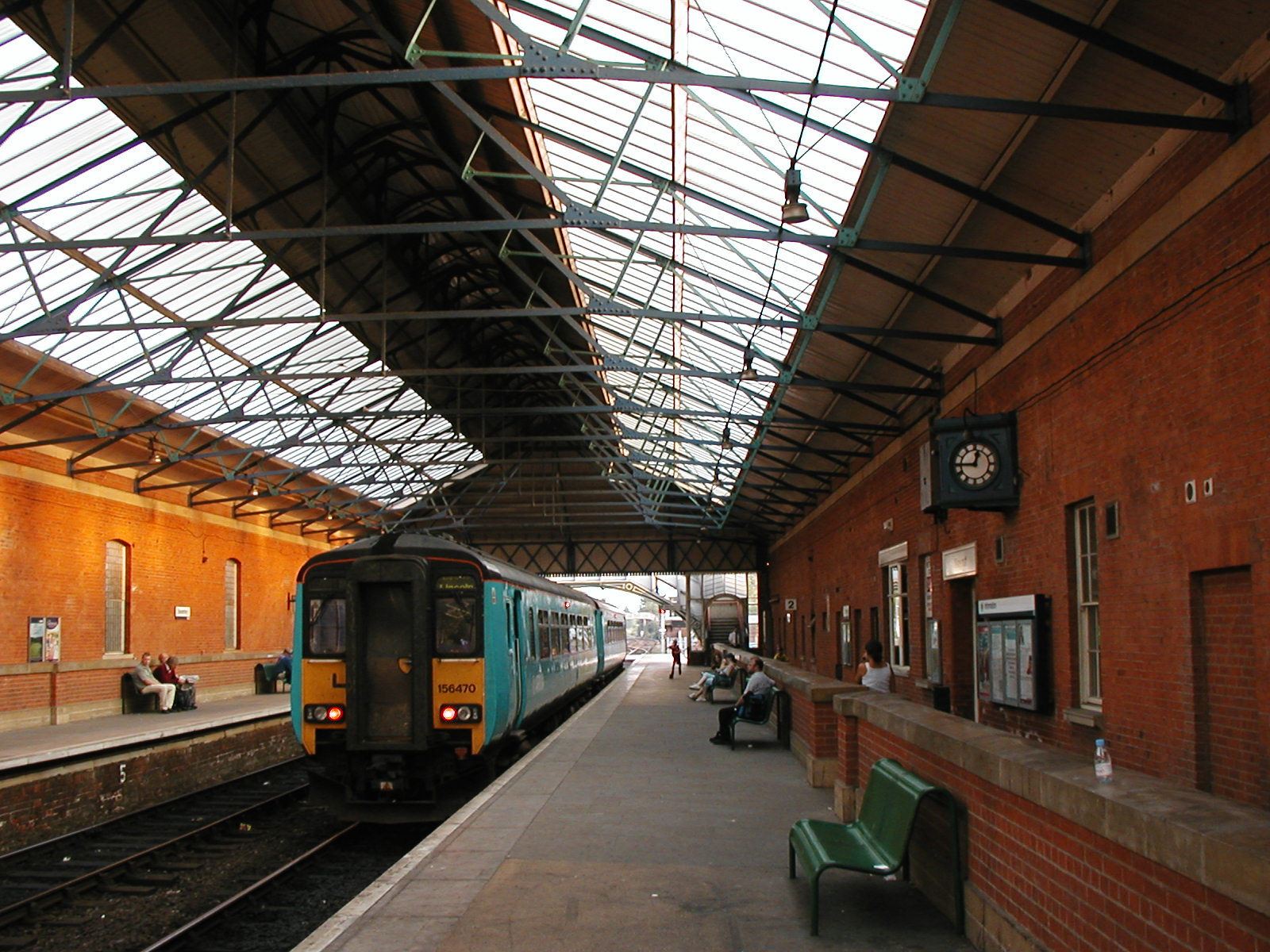
Beverley, East Riding of Yorkshire, England

- Beverley, East Riding of Yorkshire, England
- Bournemouth, Dorset, England
- Budapest Nyugati, Hungary
- Budapest Keleti, Hungary
- Carlisle Citadel, Cumbria, England
- Chester, Cheshire, England
- Crewe, Cheshire, England
- Edinburgh Waverley, Scotland
- Filey, East Riding of Yorkshire, England
- Frome, Somerset, England

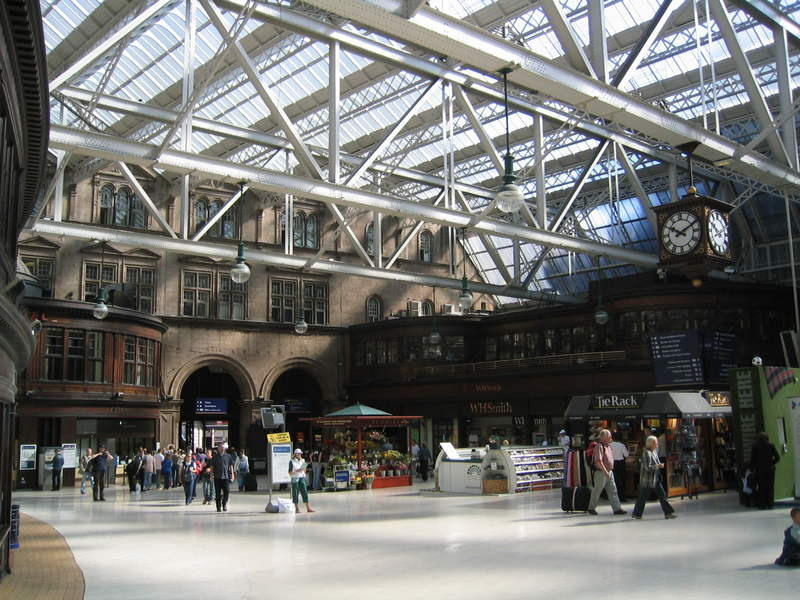
Glasgow Central, Scotland

- Glasgow Central station, Strathclyde, Scotland
- Harrisburg Transportation Center, Harrisburg, Pennsylvania, United States
- Kuala Lumpur, Malaysia
- London Liverpool Street, England

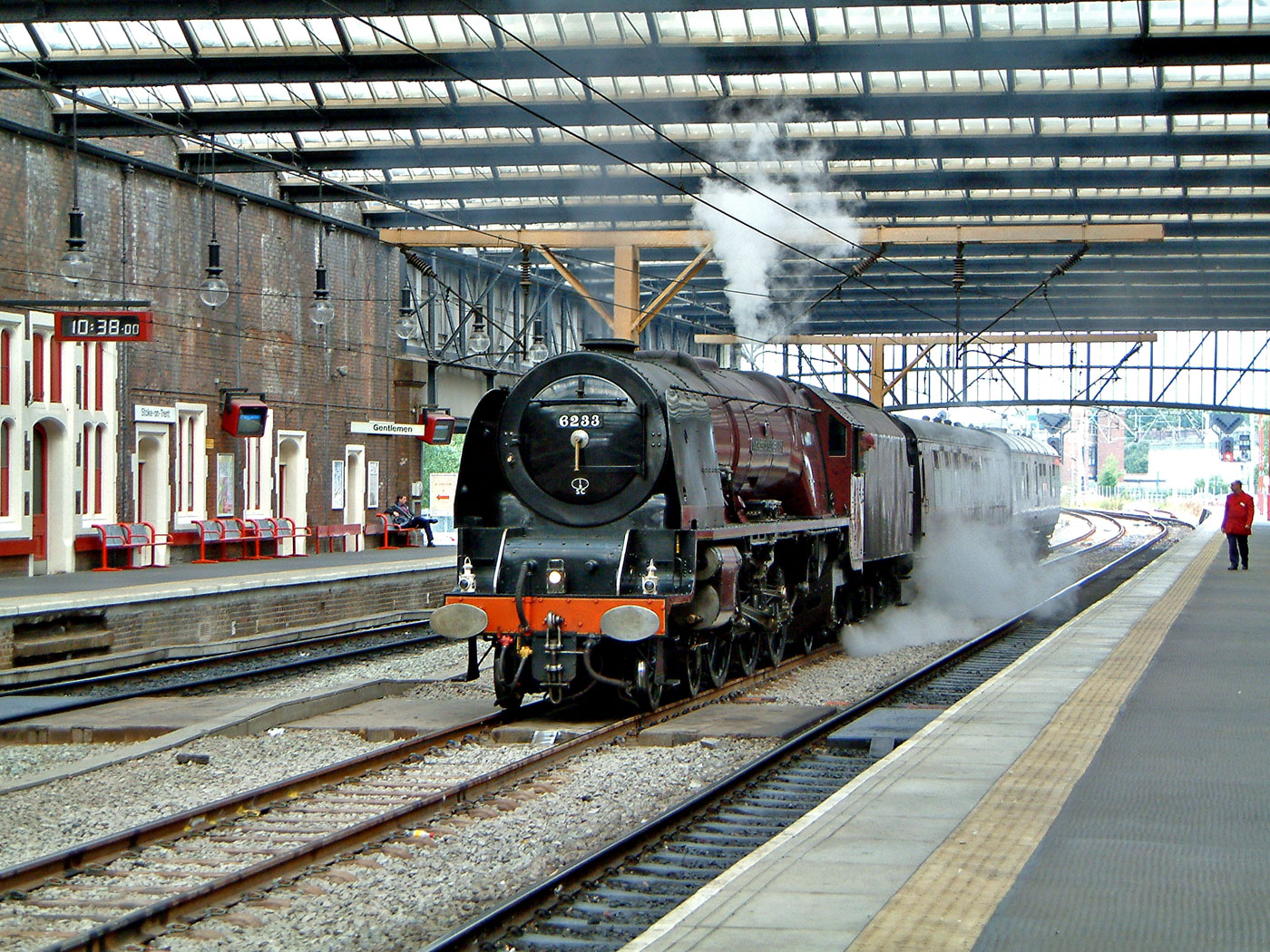
Stoke-on-Trent, England

- Paris Gare du Nord, France
- Paris Gare de Lyon, France
- Preston, Lancashire, England
- Stoke-on-Trent, Staffordshire, England
- Wemyss Bay, Inverclyde, Scotland.

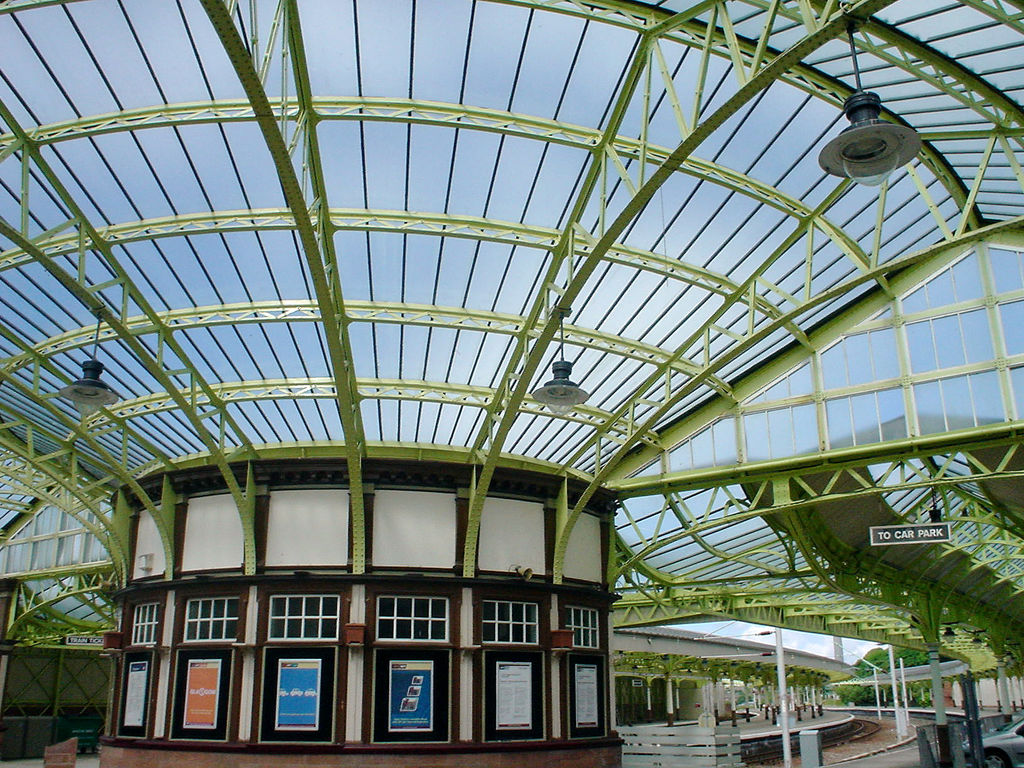
Wemyss Bay, Scotland

Surviving examples of Bush-type, developed by American civil engineer Lincoln Bush, and related train sheds include:

- Hoboken Terminal, Hoboken, New Jersey, United States
- Union station, Winnipeg, Manitoba, Canada

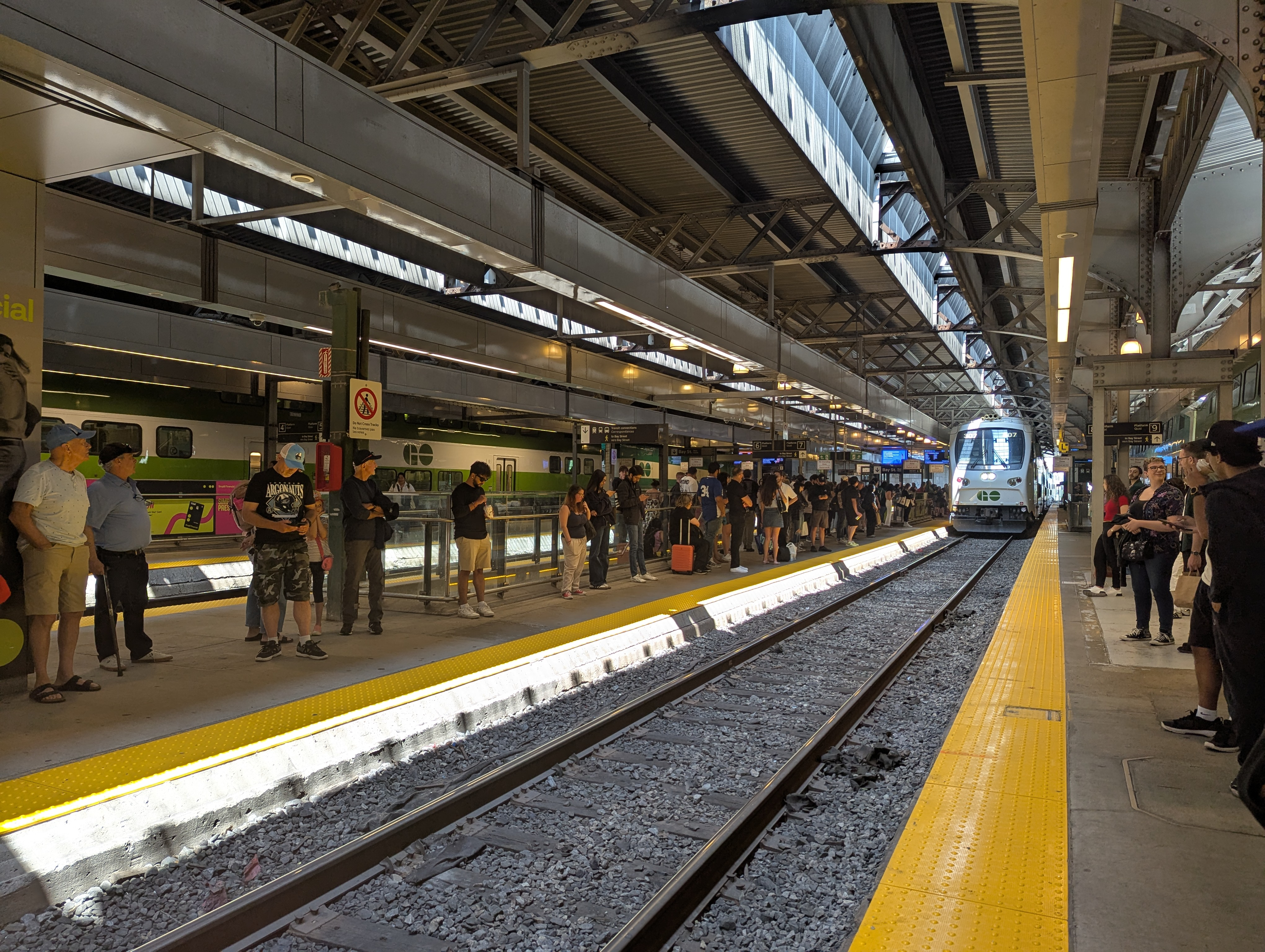
Interior view of Ketterson train shed at Toronto Union Station

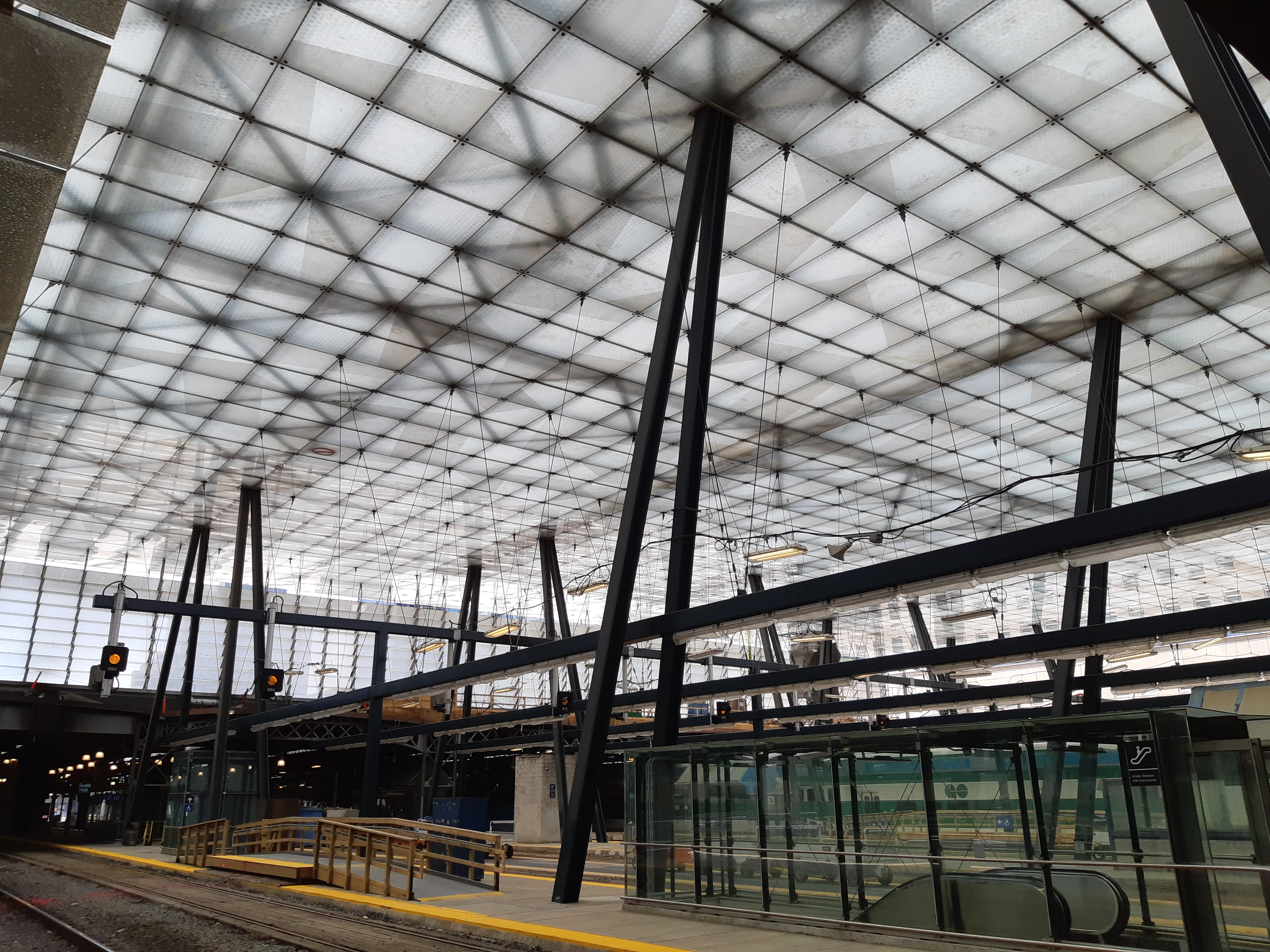
New glass roof shed at Toronto Union station

- Toronto Union Station, Toronto, Ontario, Canada - designed by A.R. Ketterson
- Communipaw Terminal, Jersey City, New Jersey, United States
- Mount Royal station used by Maryland Institute College of Art for its Sculpture program Baltimore, Maryland.

Surviving examples of other train sheds include:

- Pennsylvania Station (Newark), Newark, New Jersey, United States
- The SEPTA platform area of 30th Street Station, Philadelphia, United States

=== Concrete ===
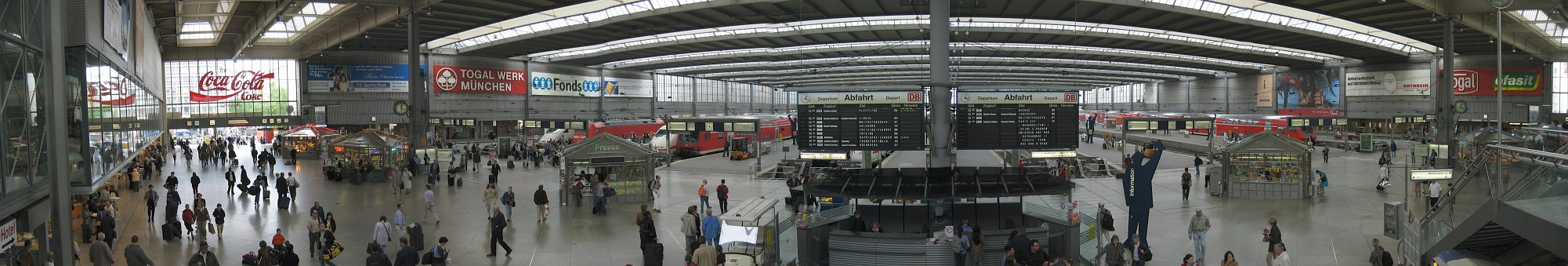
München Hauptbahnhof train shed, dating to the 1960s

The middle of the twentieth century saw concrete used as a structural material.

Surviving examples include:

- Cockfosters tube station, London, England
- Uxbridge tube station, London, England
- Volksdorf U-Bahn station, Hamburg, Germany.

=== Modern steel and glass ===
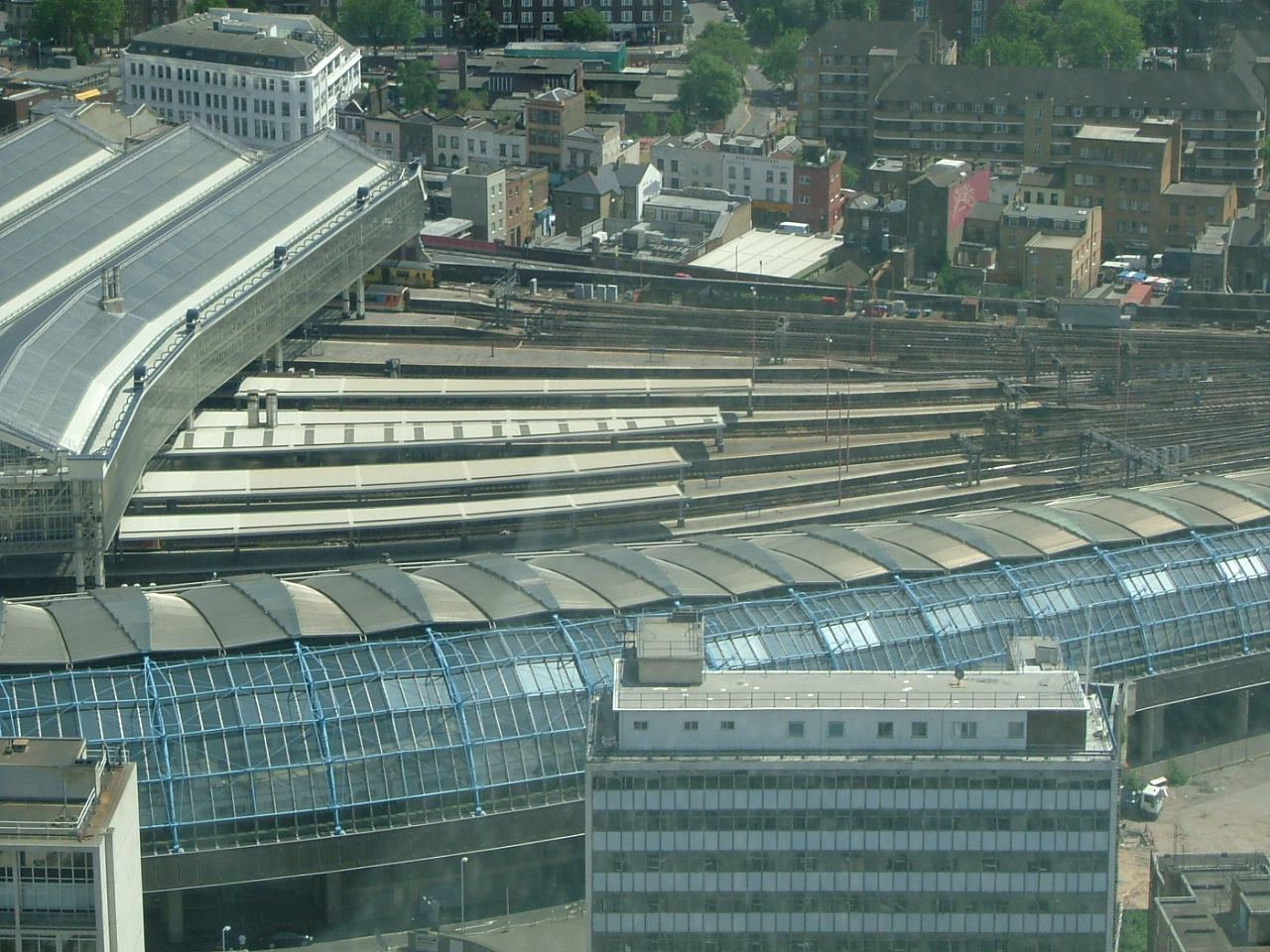
Waterloo International (across the foreground) with the older Waterloo station beyond (June 2004)

After many years with few, if any, significant new train sheds, recent years have seen some major stations given graceful train sheds by using modern technology. Examples include:

- Berlin Hauptbahnhof, Berlin, Germany
- Longyang Road station on the Shanghai Maglev Train line
- Gwangmyeong Station, Seoul, South Korea
- Jefferson Station, Philadelphia, United States (the station is located underground but has above-ground structures to shelter the platforms and trains)
- Stillwell Avenue subway station, New York City, United States
- Waterloo International, London, England
- Southern Cross station, Melbourne, Australia
- Liège-Guillemins, Liège, Belgium
- Manchester Victoria station, Greater Manchester, England.

In the United States, the Walt Disney World Monorail System has some train sheds along its route, including the entrance-gate station and the main hall (or Grand Canyon Concourse) of the Contemporary Resort.

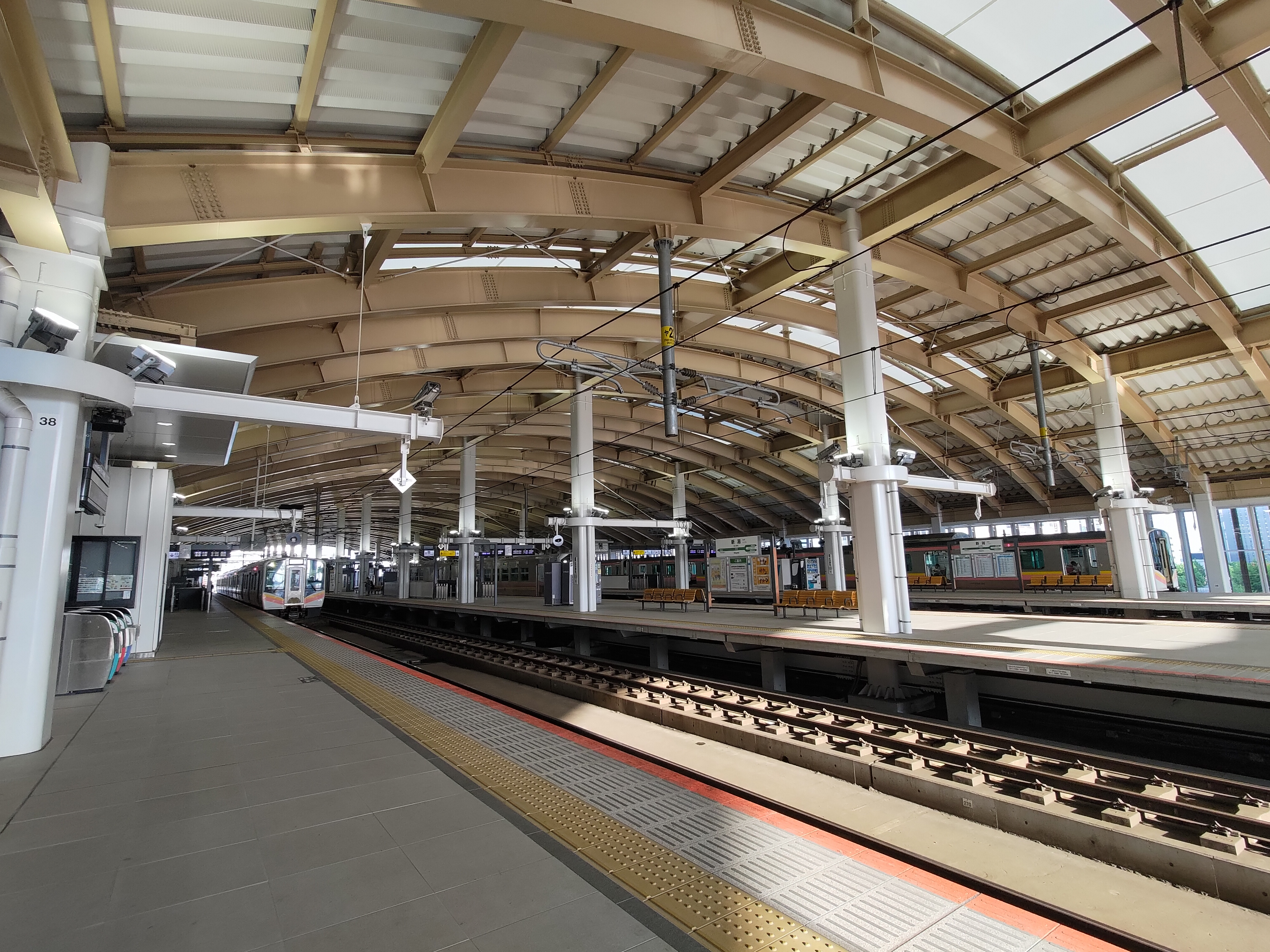
Niigata Station train shed, Japan (2022)

=== Open-air canopy ===
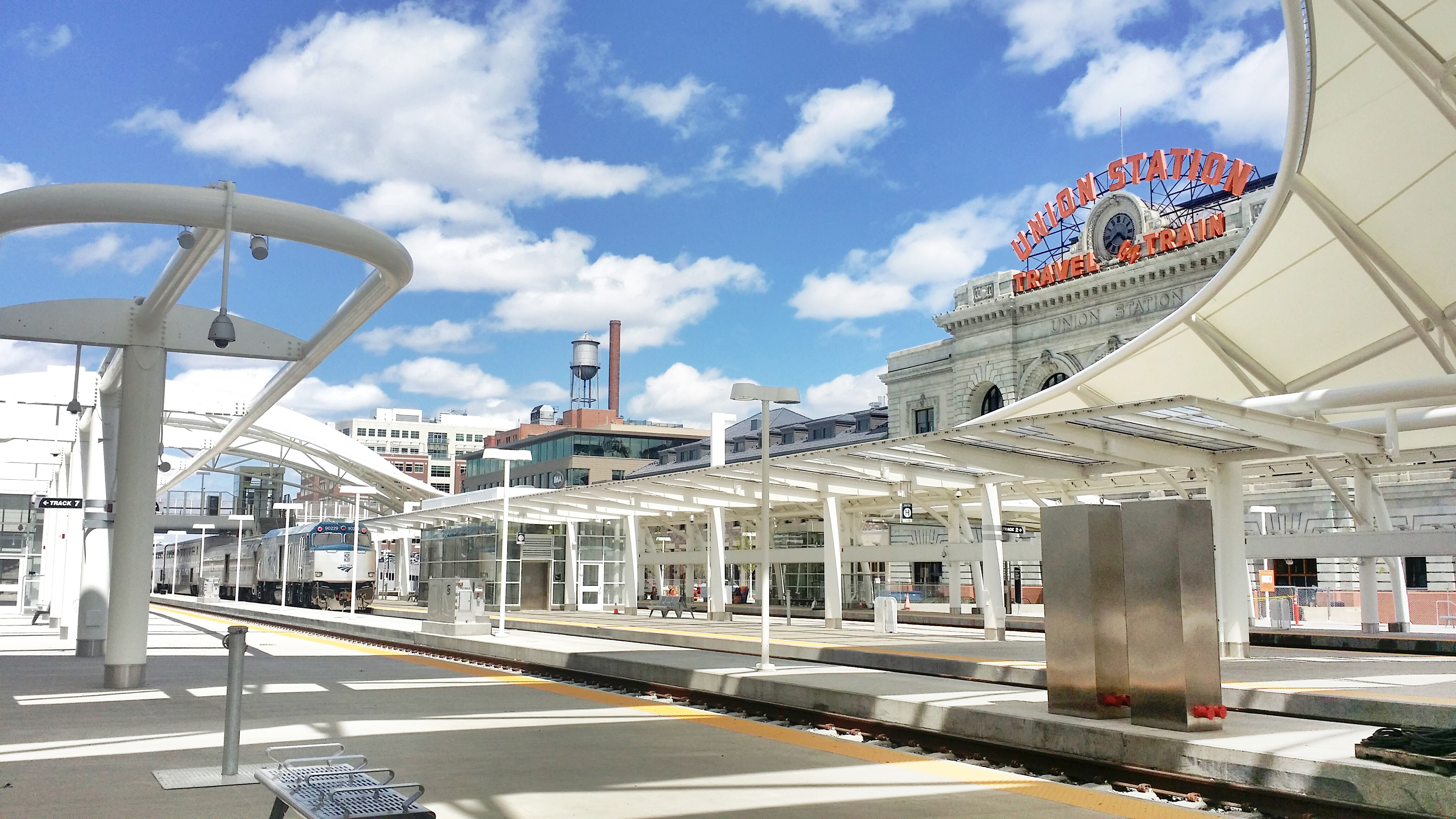
View through the open-air roof that encircles the platform area at Denver Union Station (May 2014)

- The Union Station (Denver, Colorado), Denver, Colorado, United States, features an open-air canopy structure covered with Teflon.

== Car barn ==
In North America, tram cars are called streetcars or trolleys and are sometimes stored in structures called car barns or car houses. These buildings are usually enclosed and provide cover for trams from the elements.

List of car barns (all are in Canada or the United States):

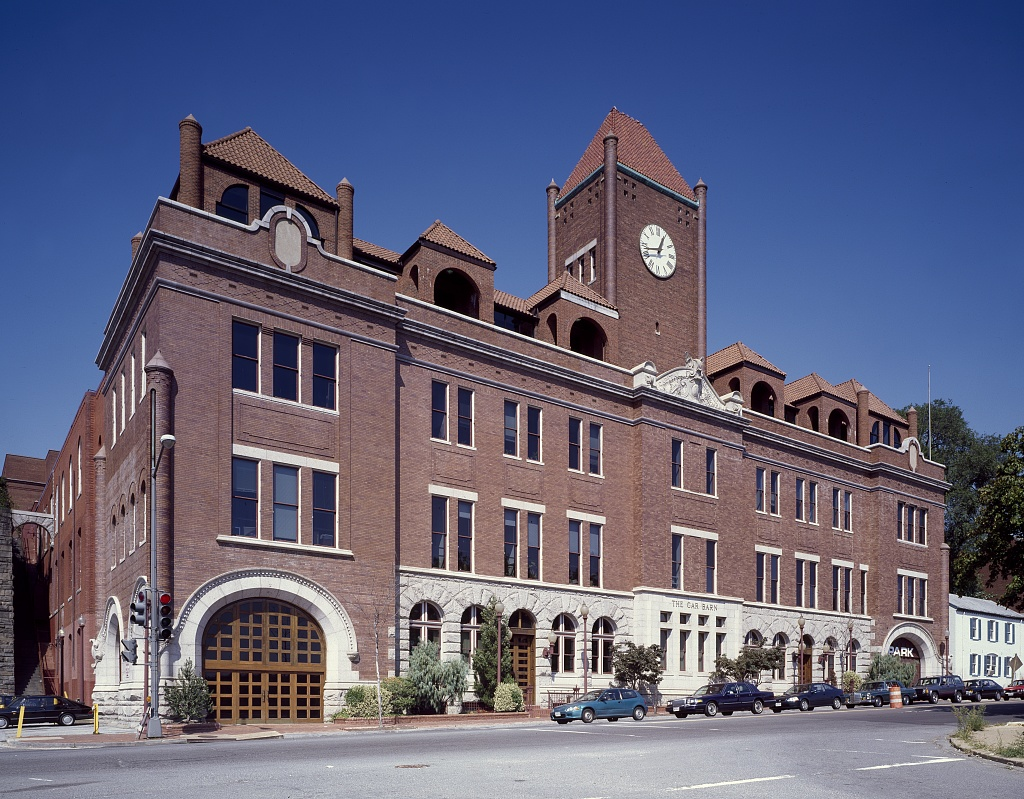
Former Georgetown Car Barn, Washington D.C. (between 1980 and 2006)

- Ashby Street Car Barn - Atlanta, Georgia
- East Capitol Street Car Barn - Washington DC
- Eglinton Maintenance and Storage Facility (Black Creek Carhouse) - Toronto
- Georgetown Car Barn - Washington DC
- North Cambridge Carhouse - Cambridge, Massachusetts
- Plaistow Carhouse - Plaistow, New Hampshire
- Leslie Barns - Toronto
- Luzerne Carhouse - Philadelphia
- Roncesvalles Carhouse - Toronto
- Russell Carhouse (Connaught Barns) - Toronto
- Watertown Yard - Watertown, Massachusetts
- Wychwood Barns (former St. Clair Carhouse) - now a community centre in Toronto.

== See also ==
- Bus station
