= Portage la Prairie station =

Railway station in Portage la Prairie, Manitoba, Canada

Portage la Prairie
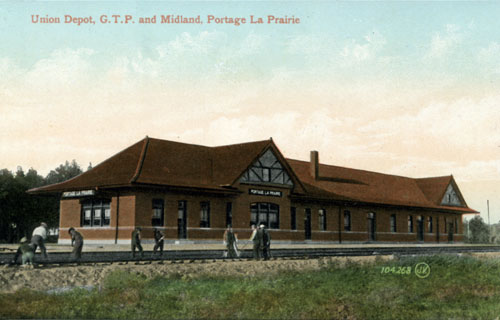
- The station circa 1911

General information
- Location: 130 Fisher Avenue; Portage la Prairie, MB; Canada
- Coordinates: 49°58′38″N 98°17′17″W
- Platforms: 1
- Tracks: 1

Construction
- Structure type: Shelter

History
- Opened: 1908

Services
Preceding station	Via Rail	Following station
Rivers toward Vancouver	The Canadian	Winnipeg toward Toronto
Gladstone toward Churchill	Winnipeg–Churchill	Winnipeg Terminus
Former services
Preceding station	Via Rail	Following station
Carberry toward Vancouver	The Canadian before 1990	Winnipeg toward Toronto or Montreal
Brandon North toward Vancouver	Super Continental	Winnipeg toward Toronto
Preceding station	Canadian National Railway	Following station
Arona toward Vancouver	Main Line	Winnipeg toward Montreal
McArthur toward Edmonton	Edmonton – Winnipeg via North Battleford and Regina	Winnipeg Terminus
Muir toward North Battleford	North Battleford – Winnipeg via Swan River and Hallboro	Winnipeg Terminus
Hobson toward Calgary	Calgary – Winnipeg	Curtis toward Winnipeg
Terminus	Cabot Branch	Gervais toward Winnipeg
Alpha toward Alonsa	Alonsa – Portage la Prairie	Terminus
Location

The Portage la Prairie station is a railway station in Portage la Prairie, Manitoba, Canada, currently served by Via Rail's transcontinental Canadian, and the Winnipeg–Churchill train.

A one-story brick building, the station operates as a flag stop for the Canadian, with 24-hour advance notice recommended, as well as being a regular stop on the Winnipeg-Churchill route.

It was originally served by the Canadian National Railway mainline.

Also designated a national historic site is the Portage la Prairie Canadian Pacific Railway Station that no longer provides passenger services but operates as a museum.

== History ==
This Portage la Prairie station was built in 1908 by the Grand Trunk Pacific Railway (predecessor of the Canadian National Railway) and the Midland Railway of Manitoba as a union station.

The station was designated a national historic site in 1992.

It was formerly used as a Greyhound bus stop until the early 2000s when it moved to Portage la Prairie Mall. Greyhound Canada service later ended in Western Canada on October 31, 2018.
