= Countess of Dufferin =

American/Canadian 4-4-0 locomotive

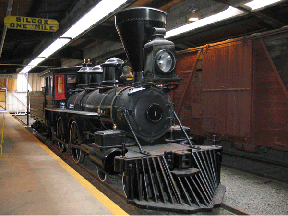
Type and origin
- Power type: Steam
- Builder: Baldwin Locomotive Works
- Serial number: 2660
- Build date: 1872
Specifications
- Configuration
  - Whyte: 4-4-0
- Driver dia.: 57 in (1.4 m)
- Fuel type: Wood
- Cylinders: Two, outside
- Cylinder size: 15 in (380 mm) diameter × 24 in (610 mm) stroke
Career
- Operators: Northern Pacific Railway (NP), Canadian Pacific Railway (CPR), Columbia River Lumber Company
- Numbers: NP 21; CPR 151
- Official name: Countess of Dufferin (CPR); The Betsy (CRLC)
- Retired: 1911
- Current owner: Winnipeg Railway Museum
- Disposition: On static display

The Countess of Dufferin is a 4-4-0 "American" type steam locomotive. It was the first steam locomotive to operate in the Canadian prairie provinces and is named after Hariot Hamilton-Temple-Blackwood, Countess of Dufferin (later Marchioness of Dufferin and Ava), the wife of the Earl of Dufferin, a Governor General of Canada.

== History ==
The locomotive was built by the Baldwin Locomotive Works (builder's plate No. 2660) and delivered to Northern Pacific Railway as No. 21 in 1872. It was used in Minnesota and the Dakota Territory until 1877 when it was sold for $9,700 to Joseph Whitehead, a contractor for Canadian Pacific Railway. The locomotive, along with six flatcars and a caboose, was loaded onto barges at Fisher's Landing, Minnesota, and propelled by the SS Selkirk, they were shipped down the Red River to St. Boniface, now an electoral district of Winnipeg, Manitoba, arriving October 9, 1877, at a cost of $440.

Upon arrival the locomotive was used on Government of Canada Contract No. 5, the first contract issued in the promised rail link that brought British Columbia into Confederation. The locomotive was used in the completion of Pembina branch to the U.S. border, linking Winnipeg with Minneapolis. Next it worked east from Winnipeg to the Lakehead in northwestern Ontario, connecting with contractors from eastern Canada. In 1883 ownership was transferred and it became Canadian Pacific No. 151. It then worked west from Winnipeg to Golden, British Columbia (Government of Canada Contract No. 15) where it was last used as a construction locomotive.

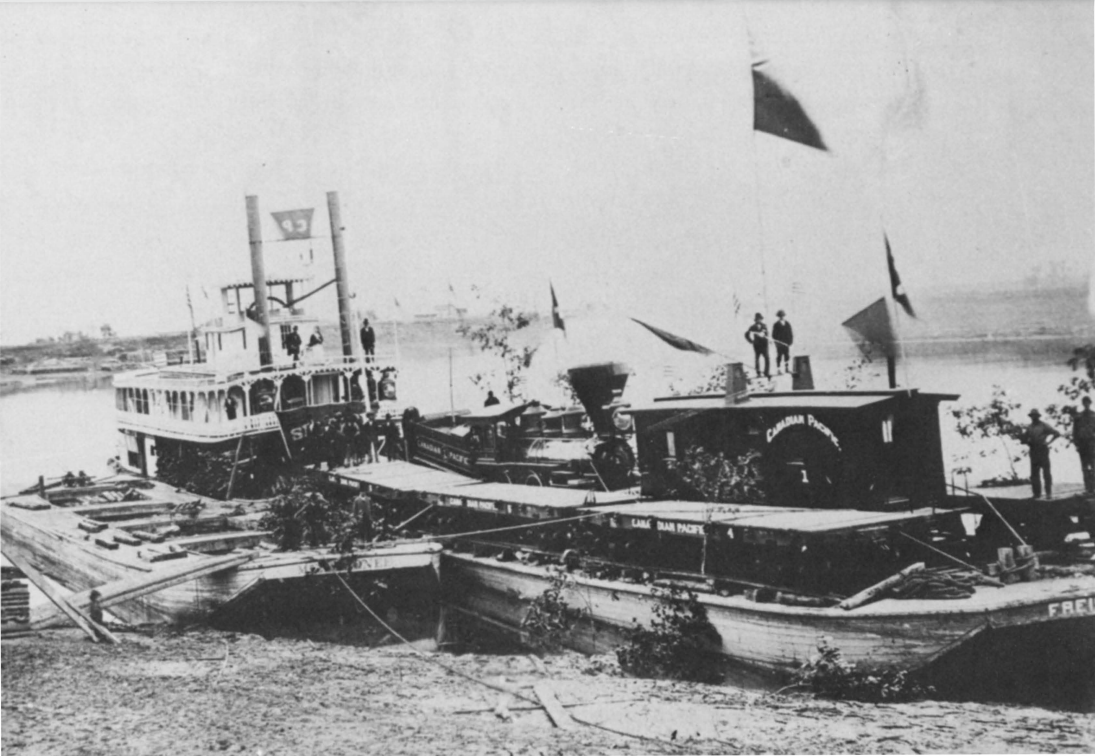
A barge carrying the locomotive arrives in Winnipeg in 1877.

In the mid-1880s, the locomotive was again sold, this time to the Columbia River Lumber Company, owned by William Mackenzie and Donald Mann of the Canadian Northern Railway.

On 28 June 1887, the Countess was used to formally open the new Red River pile bridge completed by Canadian industrialist Hugh Ryan with Ryan, his wife Margaret, and the Canadian Pacific Railway Superintendent T. J. Linskey aboard. By the end of the 1890s, Mackenzie and Mann had renamed the locomotive as The Betsy and used it to power the sawmill.

In 1909, the City of Winnipeg learned of the locomotive's existence and convinced the owners to donate it to the city. It was transported back to Winnipeg, restored in the Weston Shop and renumbered CPR No. 1. It was displayed in various locations until 1977, when George Richardson and the CPR spent a considerable amount of money to fully restore the Countess of Dufferin. The locomotive now resides in the Winnipeg Railway Museum located on tracks 1 and 2 in Via Rail's Union Station in downtown Winnipeg.
