= Melville station =

Railway station in Melville, Saskatchewan, Canada

Melville
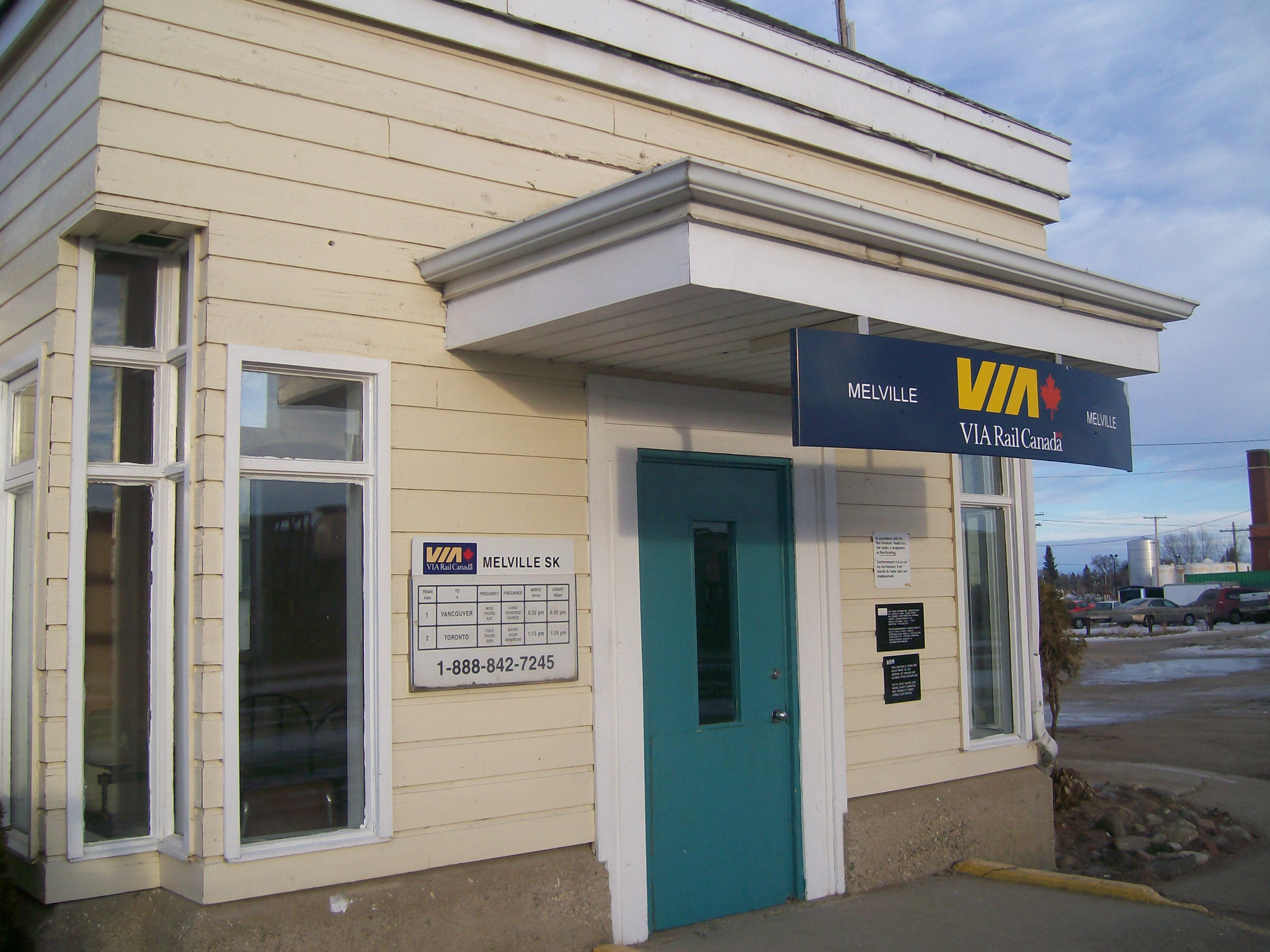

General information
- Location: Main St & 1st Ave, Melville, SK; Canada
- Coordinates: 50.9263°N 102.8072°W
- Platforms: 1 side platform
- Tracks: 2

Construction
- Structure type: Shelter

History
- Opened: 1908
- Former names: Grand Trunk Pacific Railway

Services
Preceding station	Via Rail	Following station
Watrous toward Vancouver	The Canadian	Rivers toward Toronto

Former services
Preceding station	Via Rail	Following station
Ituna toward Vancouver	Super Continental	Yarbo toward Toronto
Preceding station	Canadian National Railway	Following station
Birmingham toward Vancouver	Main Line	Cana toward Montreal
Colmer toward Regina	Regina – Hudson Bay Junction	Brewer toward Hudson Bay Junction
Location

Melville station is on the Canadian National Railway mainline in Melville, Saskatchewan, Canada. The station is served by Via Rail's The Canadian. The station was declared a national historic site in 1992.

== History ==
The station building, built in 1908 by the Grand Trunk Pacific Railway makes use of a twin-gabled plan that is unique in Saskatchewan. This reflects the special status the station had when it was built as a division point and junction on the railway line. The town was named after Charles Melville Hays, former president of the railway.

The station and local railway buildings are featured in the 1956 National Film Board of Canada movie Railroad Town, showing when the station was used as a divisional point for steam locomotives and the transition to diesels. At the time, about half of the small community of 4,500 people were dependent on the railroad for their livelihoods. The yard at the station could see 20 trains a day and handle as many as 1,000 cars over a 24-hour period at that point in time.

In 2010, the Melville Rail Station Heritage Association acquired the title to the station building. The group plans to restore both the interior and exterior of the station.

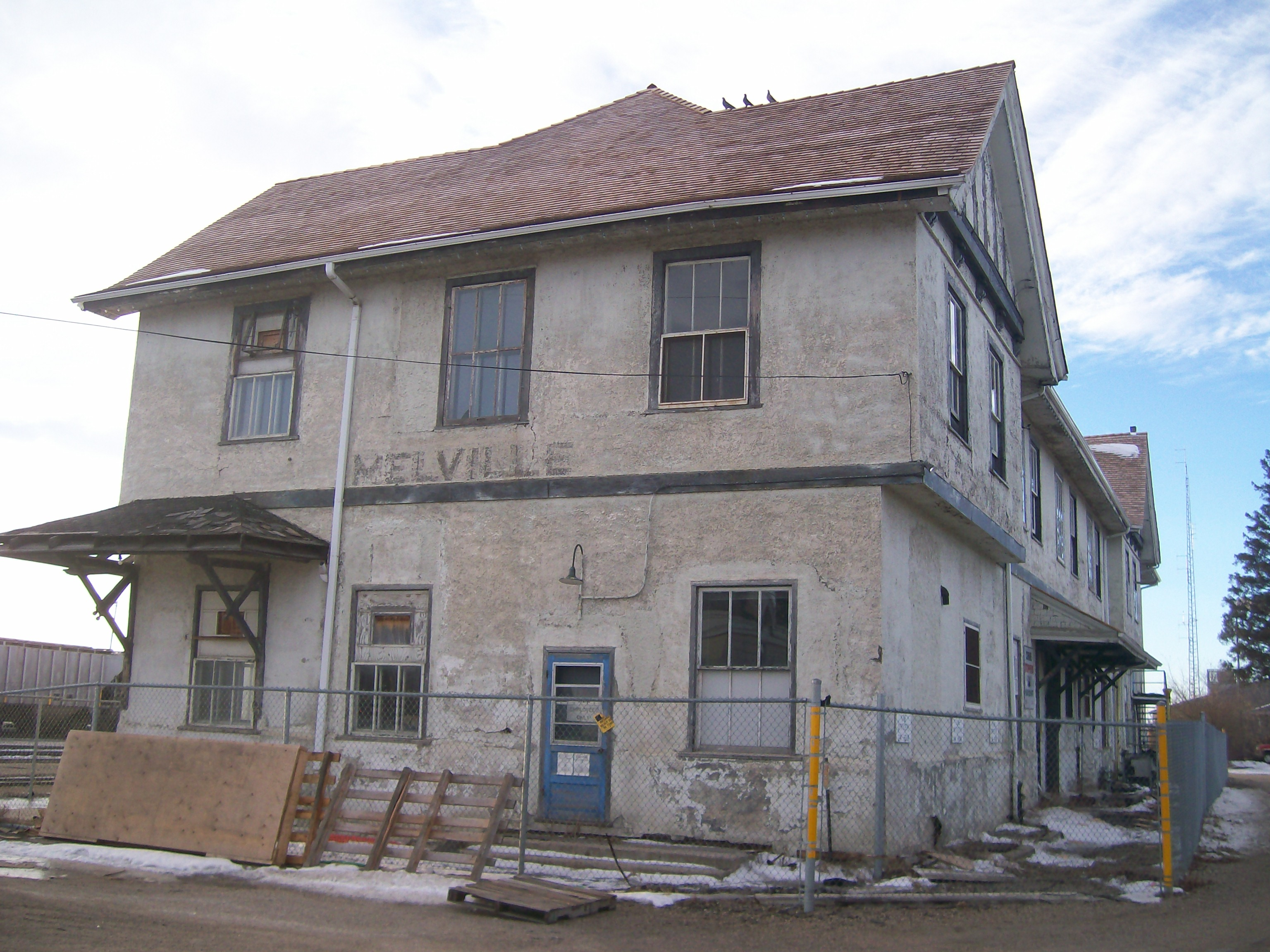
Derelict former station building

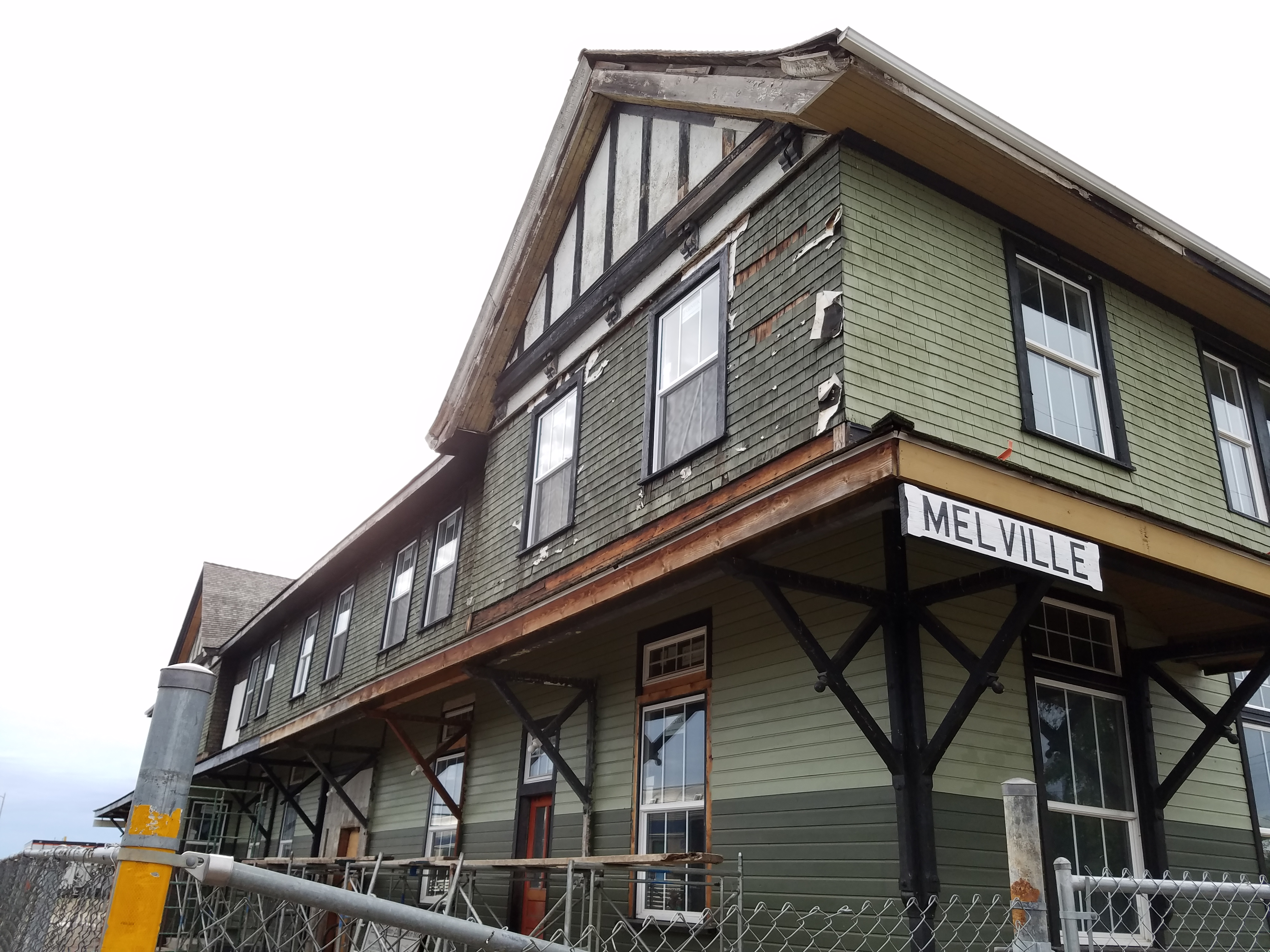
Building undergoing restoration in 2019
