= Winnipeg Railway Museum =

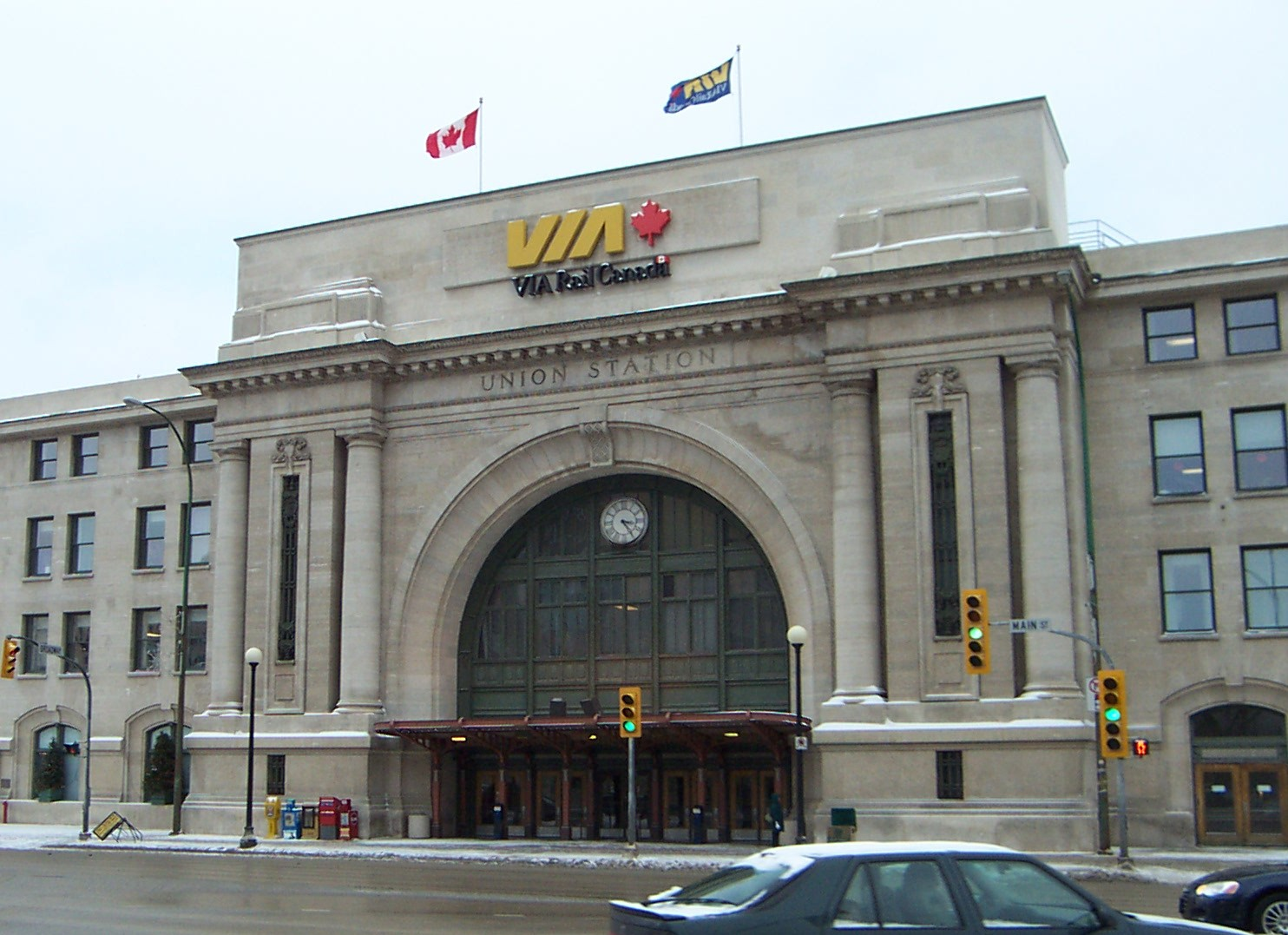

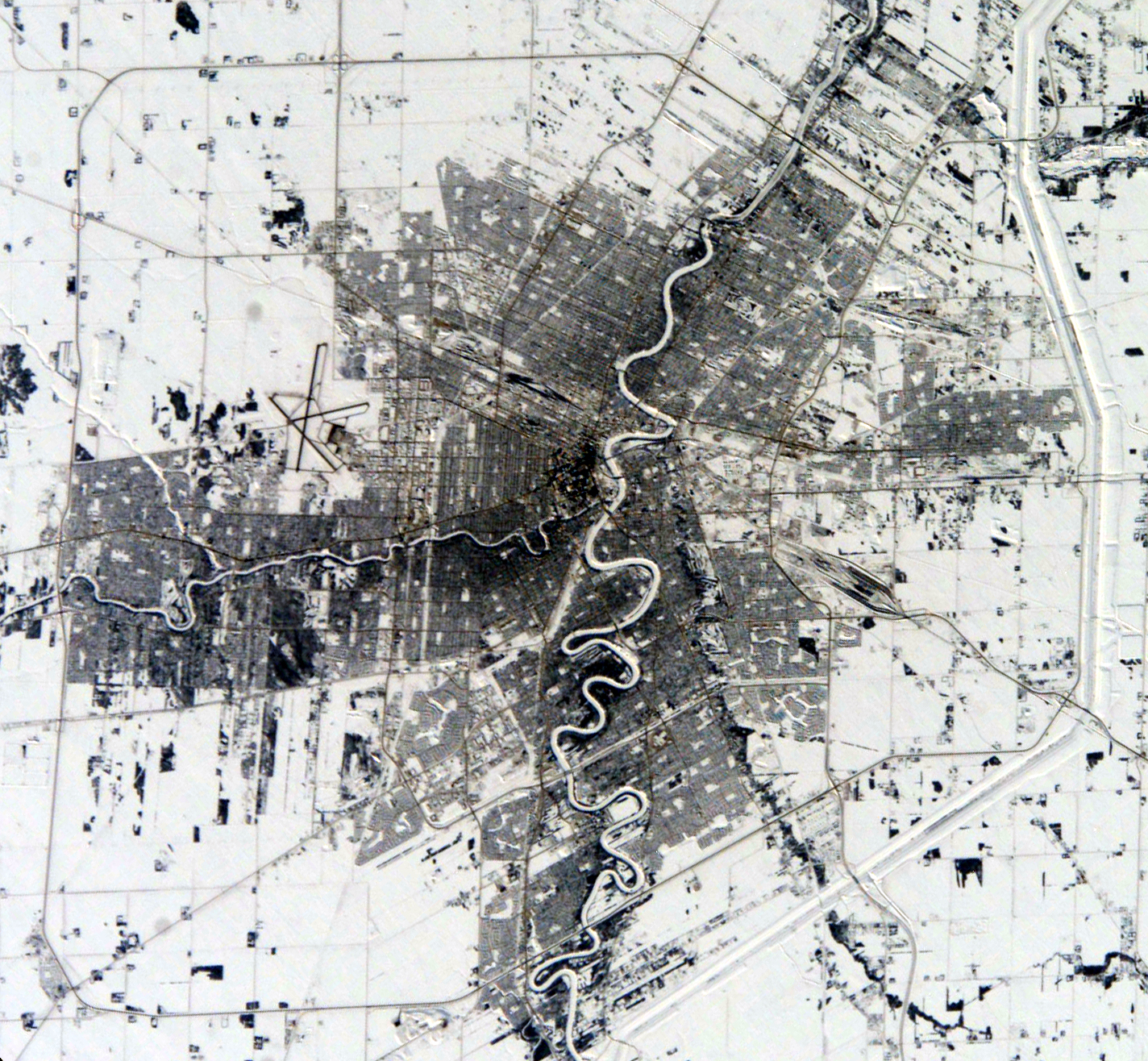
- Location within Manitoba
- Established: 1994
- Location: Union Station, 123 Main St, Winnipeg, Manitoba, Canada
- Coordinates: 49°53′20″N 97°8′3″W
- Type: Railway museum
- Key holdings: Countess of Dufferin
- Collection size: 6 locomotives, plus rolling stock
- Founders: David Harris, Norman Leathers, Roger Letourneau
- Directors: Grae Hughes, Christopher Robinson, Douglas Moberg, Gordon Leathers, Harold Davies and Douglas Bell
- President: Gary Stempnick
- Public transit access: Winnipeg Transit
- Parking: Privately operated, surrounding station
- Website: wpgrailwaymuseum.com

The Winnipeg Railway Museum was a railway museum located on tracks 1 and 2 within the Via Rail-operated Union Station in Winnipeg, Manitoba, Canada. Volunteers from the Midwestern Rail Association Inc., a non-profit organization founded in 1975, operated the museum.

The museum was affiliated with CMA, CHIN and Virtual Museum of Canada.

== Overview ==
The mission of the museum was to explore the history of railways in Winnipeg and Manitoba. The collection included the Countess of Dufferin (the first locomotive on the Canadian prairies), various vintage railcars, cabooses, a Jordan spreader from 1911, the history and artifacts of the building of the Hudson Bay Railway to Churchill, Manitoba, technical displays, and a HO scale model layout. In 2015, restoration began on Winnipeg's last wooden streetcar (Car 356), to be displayed at the Winnipeg Railway Museum.

The museum exhibit hall was located on disused platforms and tracks, where parked exhibition locomotives, carts, and portable buildings with model-train sets were on display. The staircase that led to the museum from the Via Rail station was the same one used for the platform when that section of the station was active.

Long-term plans may involve moving the Winnipeg Railway Museum elsewhere in Winnipeg to make way for a rapid transit hub station. The museum closed at the end of 2021 to prepare for necessary renovations.

In November 2022, the rail association signed a new 25 year lease with Via Rail, the owner of Union Station, for the museum. The lease is predicated on the organization addressing fire code issues. The future of the museum is still unclear, as the city still eventually intends to use the space for the rapid transit hub station.

As of May 2024, the museum has completed upgrades to the roof, windows, sky lights and lighting and is fundraising for additional upgrades. The organization hopes to reopen in November 2025, once replacement walls, and upgraded electrical and fire safety systems are complete.

== Gallery ==
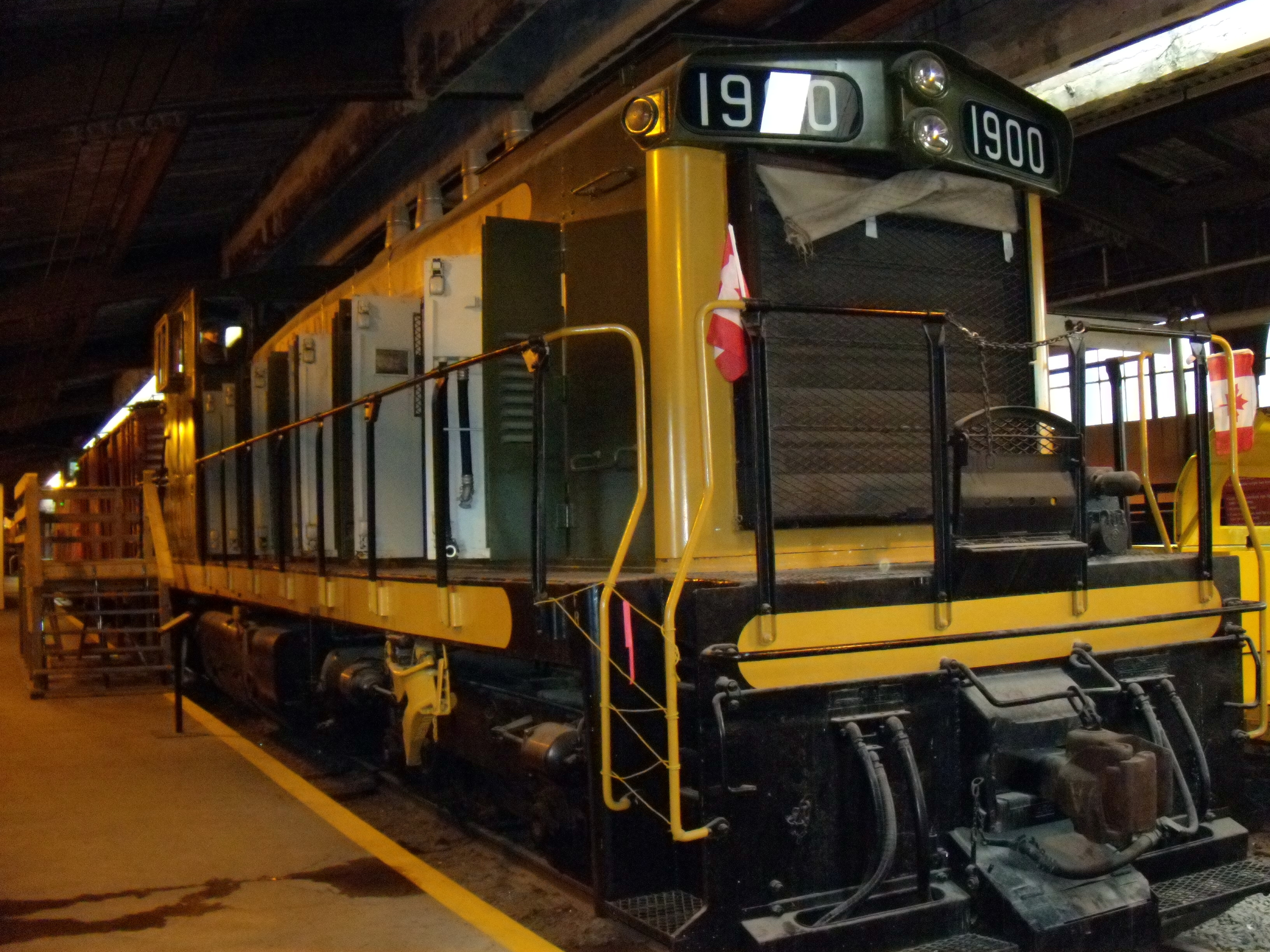
Locomotive on display

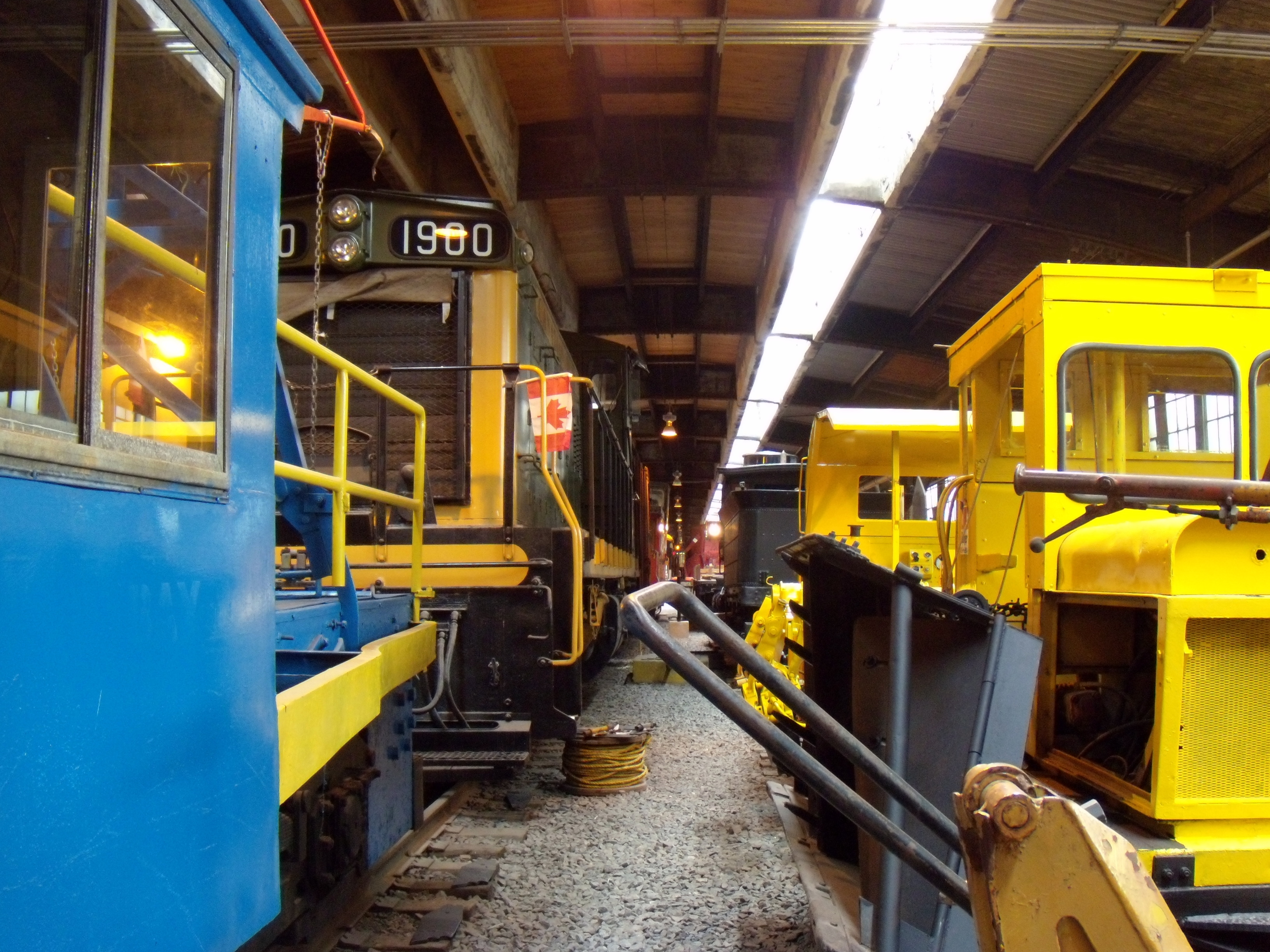
Train and equipment

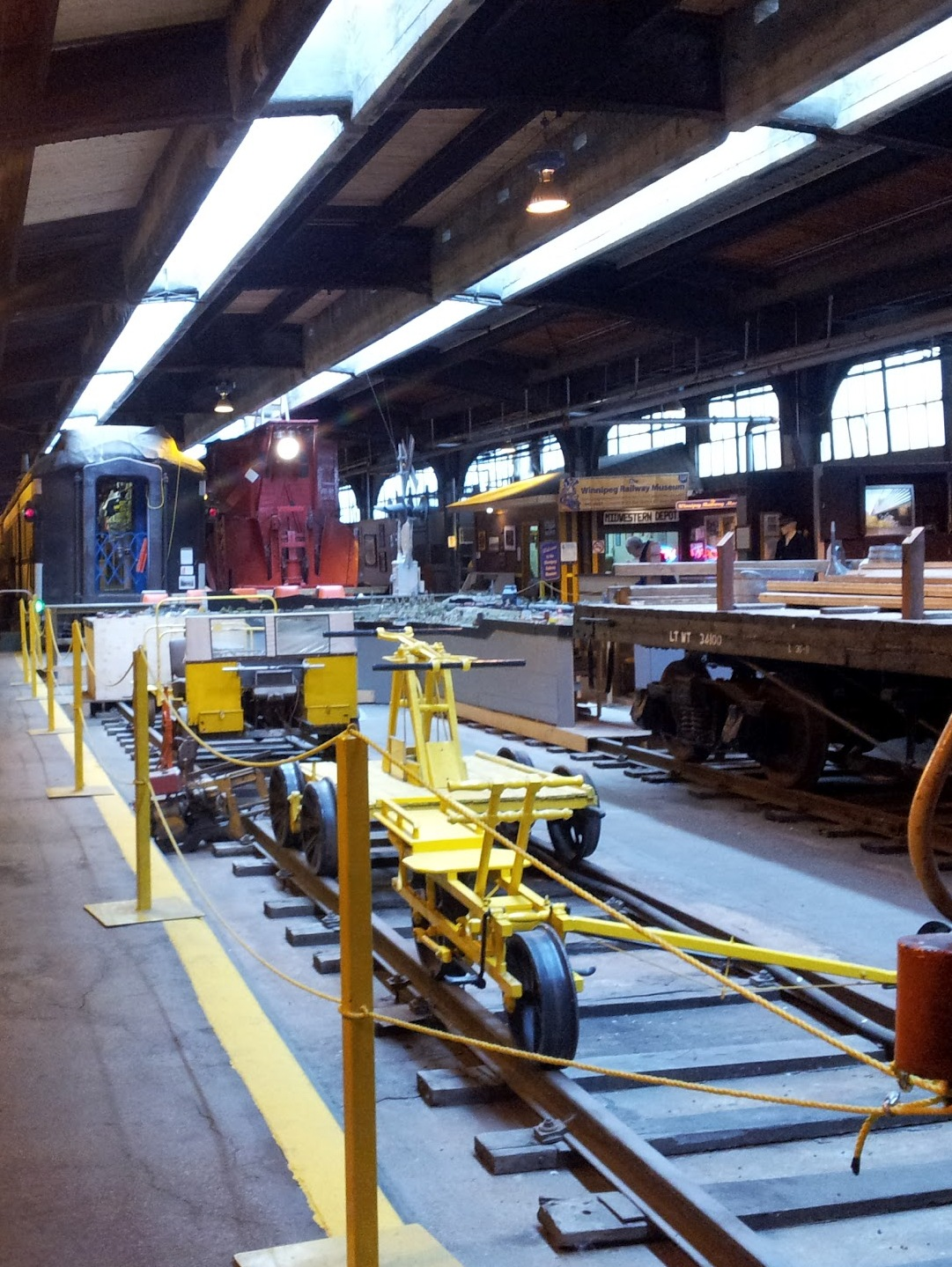
Railway equipment

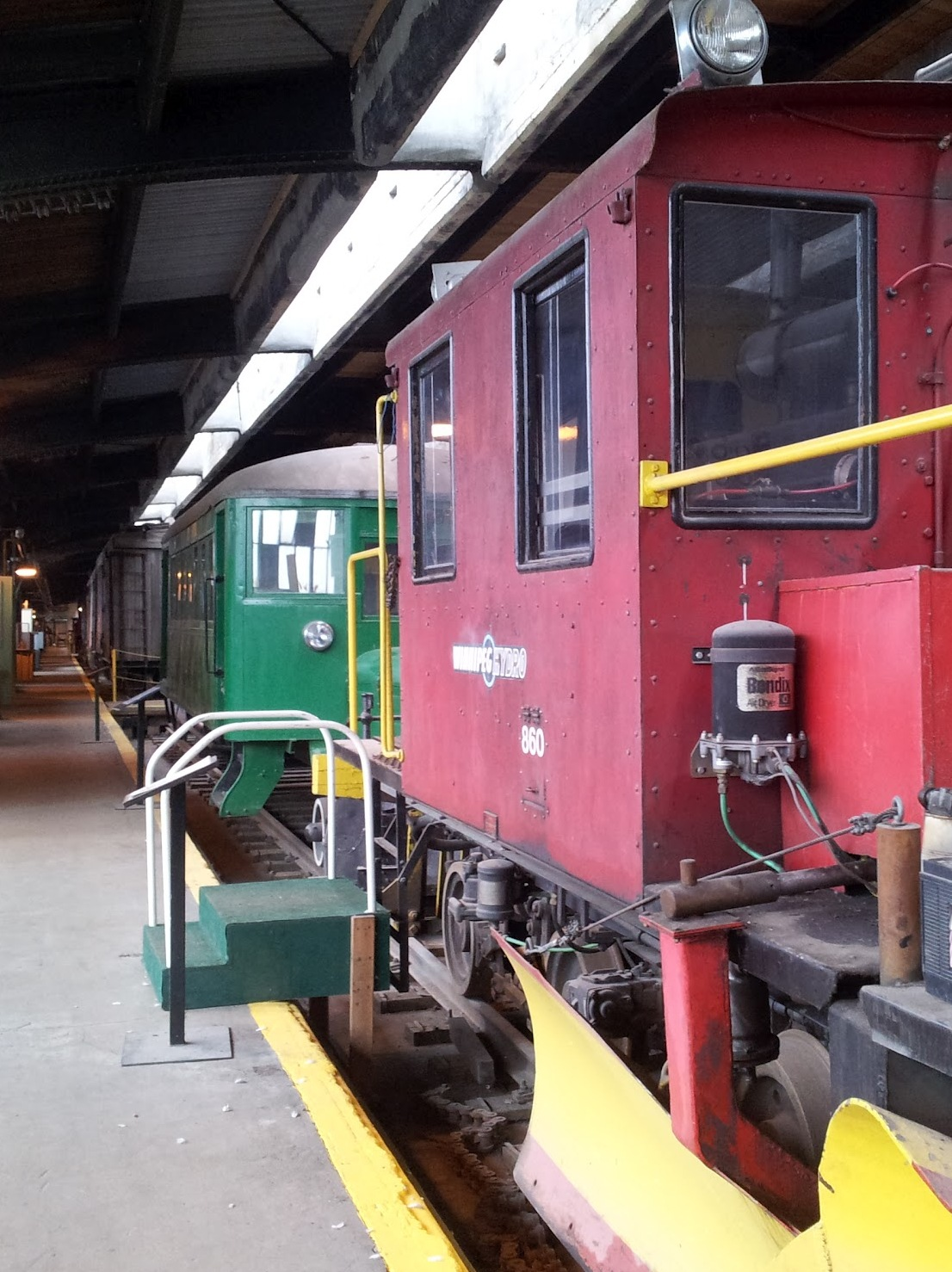
Winnipeg Hydro train

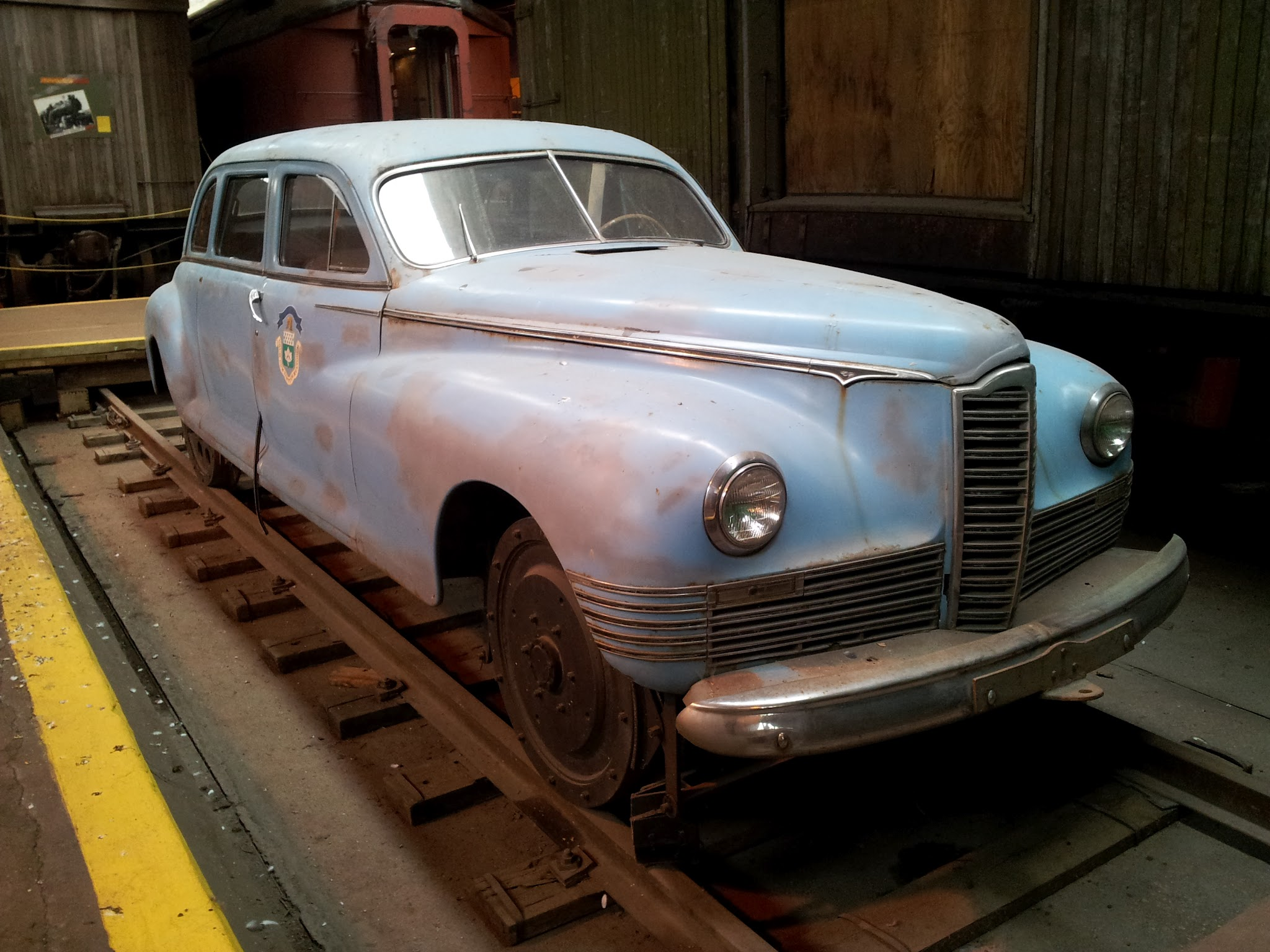
City of Winnipeg Rail Car

== See also ==
- Canadian National Railway
- Canadian Pacific Railway
- List of heritage railways in Canada
