= Atlanta Northern Railway =

Railway company in Georgia

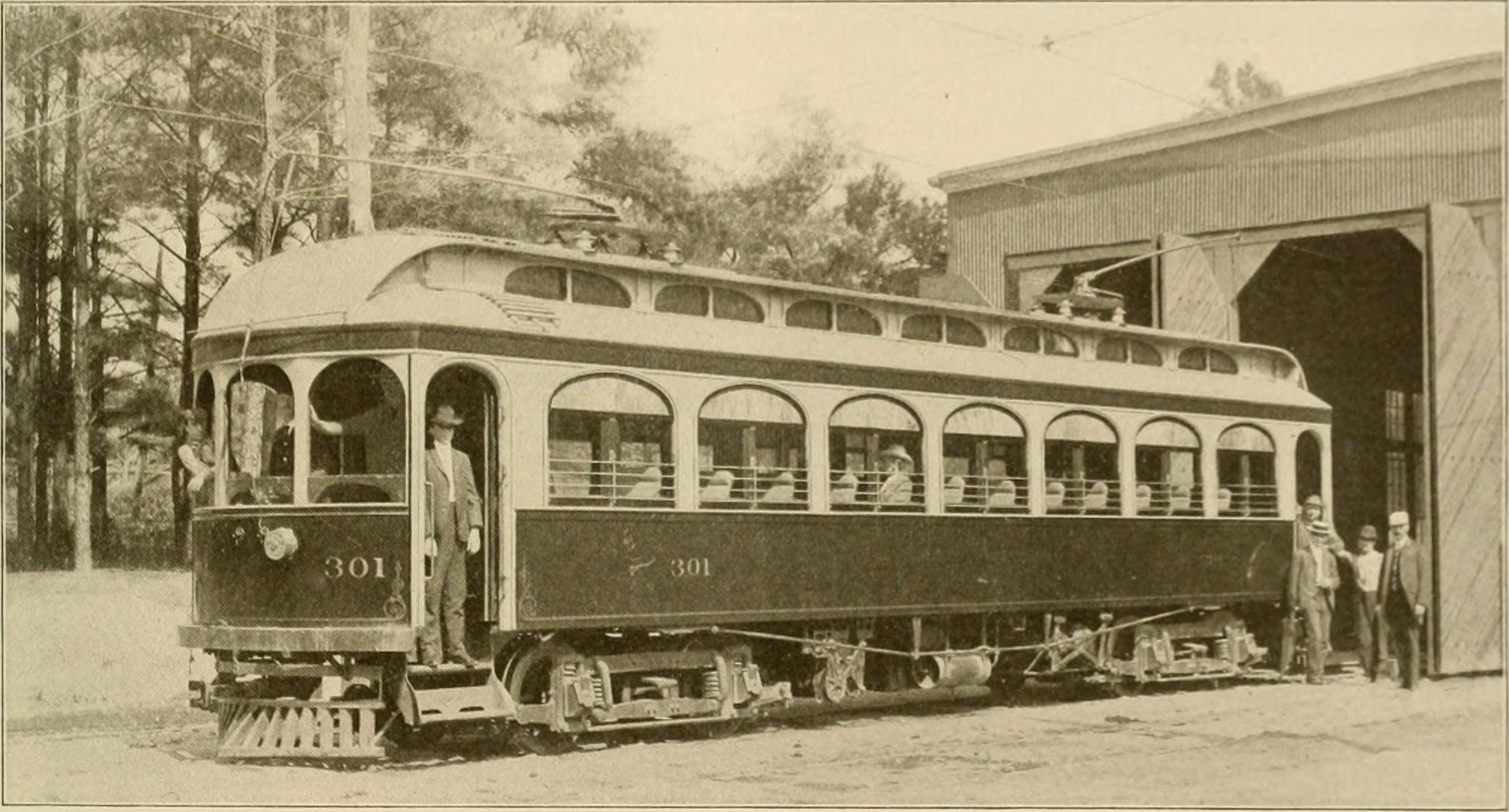
Passenger car — Atlanta Northern Railway

The Atlanta Northern Railway Company was organized in 1903 by the Georgia Railway and Power Company to build a railway line from Atlanta to Marietta, Georgia. It opened with an 18-mile (29 km) route on July 17, 1905. The interurban initially utilized a single phase 3,300 volt alternating current electrical system, though it was re-electrified to 600 volt direct current in 1923. The line was abandoned in 1947 together with the Atlanta street railway system.

== See also ==
- Ashby Street Trolly Barn
