= Rivers station =

Railway station in Manitoba, Canada

Rivers
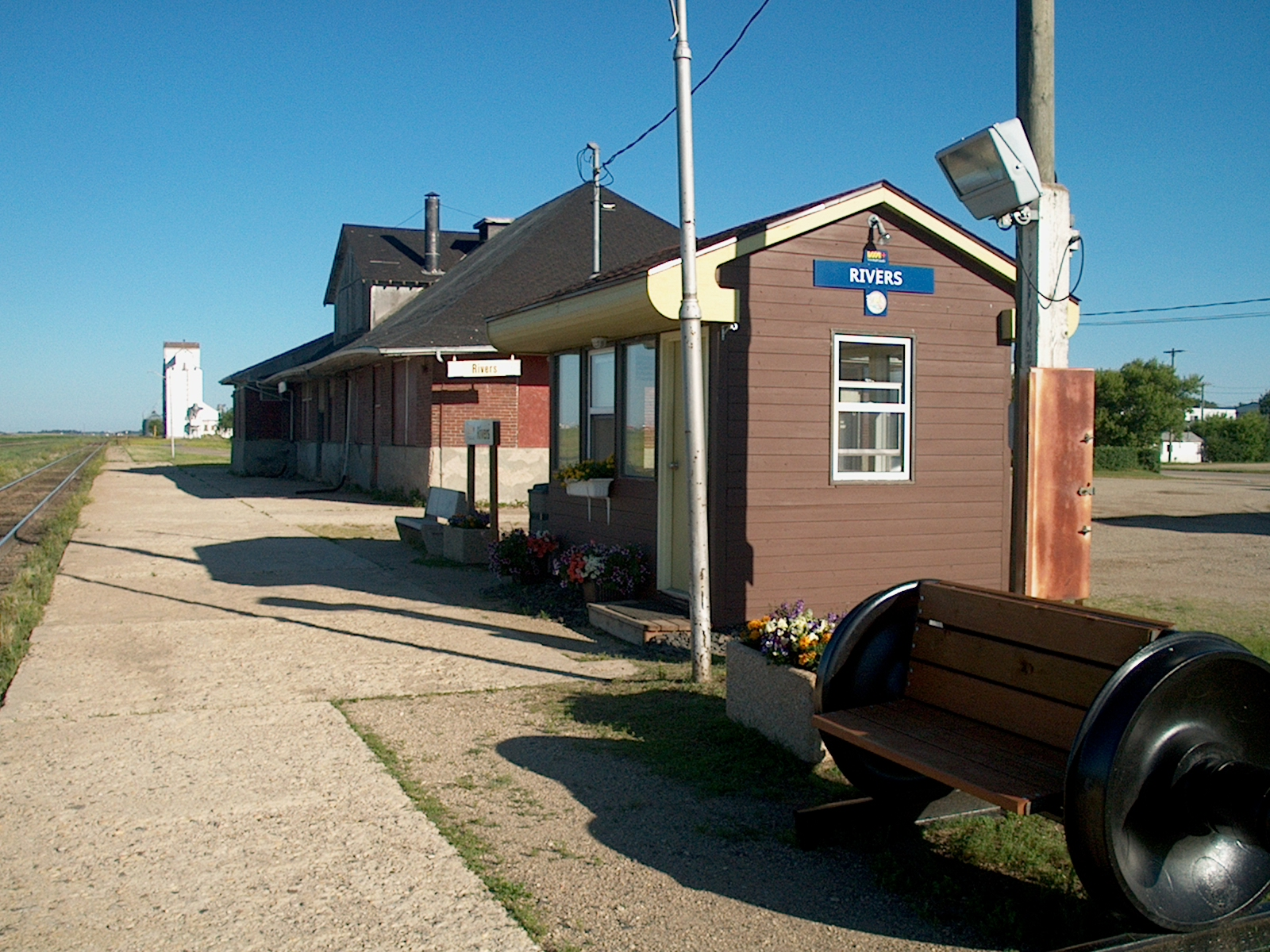

General information
- Location: Hwy 250 & Hwy 25, Rivers, Manitoba; Canada
- Coordinates: 50°01′44″N 100°14′19″W
- Platforms: 1 side platform
- Tracks: 2

Construction
- Structure type: Shelter
- Parking: Yes

History
- Opened: 1917; 109 years ago September 9, 2009; 16 years ago VIA Rail station
- Former names: Brandon North; Grand Trunk Pacific Railway

Services
Preceding station	Via Rail	Following station
Melville toward Vancouver	The Canadian	Portage la Prairie toward Toronto
Former services
Preceding station	Via Rail	Following station
St. Lazare toward Vancouver	Super Continental	Brandon North toward Toronto
Preceding station	Canadian National Railway	Following station
Myra toward Vancouver	Main Line	Brandon North toward Montreal
Location

The Rivers railway station is on the Canadian National Railway mainline in Rivers, Manitoba, in the centre of town. The station is served by Via Rail's The Canadian. The station operates as a flag stop with 48-hour advance notice.

The station was originally built in 1917 for the Grand Trunk Pacific Railway. The station building is a 1½ story structure made of concrete to halfway up the first story, brick to the roof line. The station building was closed in the 1990s, however trains continued to serve the community as a flag stop. The station was designated a national historic site in 1992. A local community group is working on restoring the building.

In 2008, Via Rail (Via) relocated its facilities serving The Canadian from Brandon North station (located 23 km (14 mi) away) to the Rivers railway station.

== Stranding ==
On March 1, 2011, Via passengers traveling east were stranded for 15 hours due to a Canadian National freight train becoming disabled near Rivers. The line was reopened, but this delay suspended Via's service between Winnipeg and Toronto in both directions. Consequently, Via had to make arrangements to accommodate about 70 affected passengers, including providing alternate transportation for them. Regular service was expected to resume the following Thursday for the Winnipeg to Toronto route, and on the next Saturday for the opposite direction.
