= St. Mary's Parish Hall =

Railway station in Alberta, Canada

Coordinates: 51.0366°N 114.0652°W

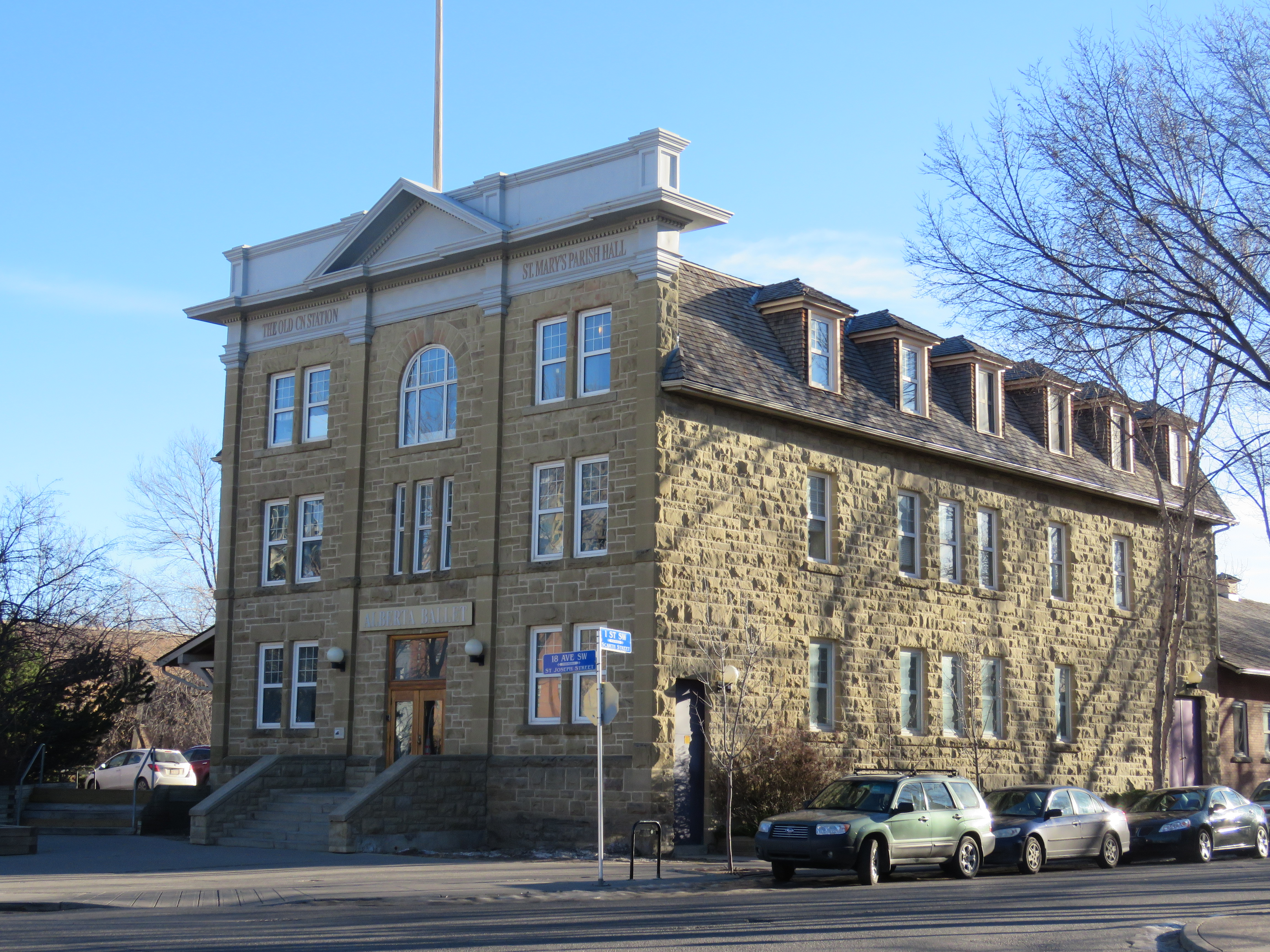
St. Mary's Parish Hall

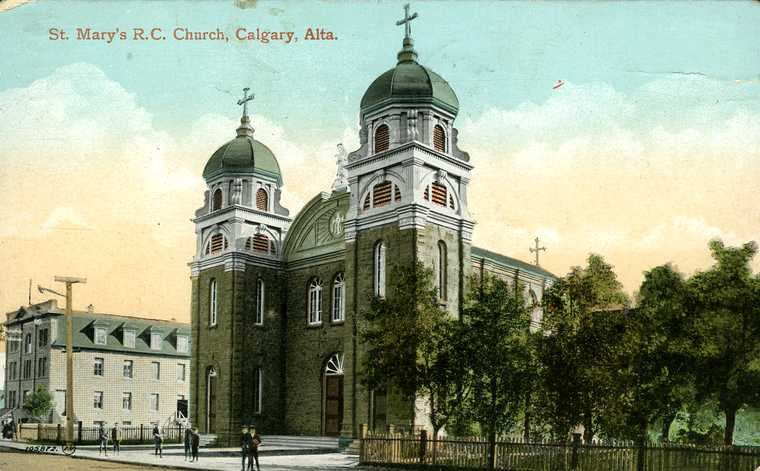
Postcard showing the Parish Hall (at the left) beside the Church, published before 1919.

St. Mary's Parish Hall is a historic sandstone building in the Mission District of Calgary. It was built in 1905 to be used as a Roman Catholic parish hall, but starting in 1913 was adaptively reused as a railway station by the Canadian Northern Railway (CNoR), during which time it was known as Calgary Southwest Railway Station. It was then operated as a railway station by the CNoR's successor, the Canadian National Railway (CN) until 1971. In 1981 the building was named a Provincial Historic Resource of Alberta. In 1985 a fire gutted most of the interior and it was restored in 1987.

Preceding station	Canadian National Railway	Following station
Terminus	Calgary – Winnipeg	Barlow Junction toward Winnipeg
Terminus	Calgary – Edmonton via Mirror	Barlow Junction toward Edmonton
Terminus	Calgary – Edmonton via Big Valley	Drumheller toward Edmonton
