= North Battleford station =

Railway station in Saskatchewan, Canada

North Battleford
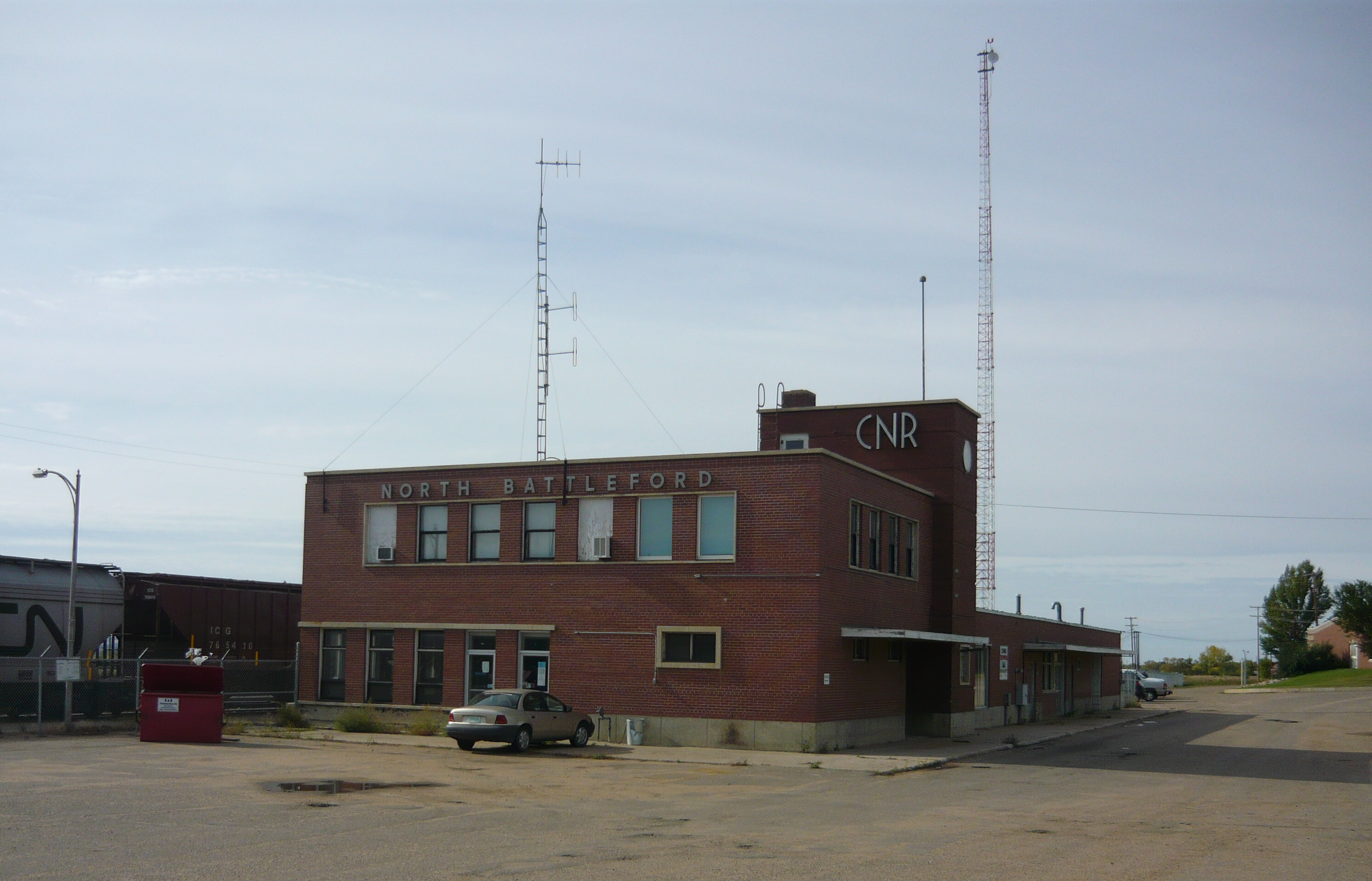

General information
- Location: 75 Railway Avenue East, North Battleford, Saskatchewan
- Coordinates: 52°46′18.5″N 108°17′55.5″W
- Owner: CN Rail
- Lines: CN Blackfoot and Aberdeen subdivisions
- Platforms: 1 (closed)

Construction
- Parking: Yes

History
- Opened: 1956

Former services
Preceding station	Canadian National Railway	Following station
Battleford Junction toward Edmonton	Edmonton – Winnipeg via North Battleford and Regina	Brada toward Winnipeg
Battleford Junction toward Carruthers	Carruthers – Biggar	Battleford Junction toward Biggar
Terminus	North Battleford – Winnipeg via Swan River and Hallboro	Brada toward Winnipeg
Location

The North Battleford station is a former railway station in North Battleford, Saskatchewan. It was built by the Canadian National Railway in 1956 and used as a passenger terminal. North Battleford no longer receives scheduled passenger rail service (the closest stations are now served by Via Rail station to the south in Biggar and Unity), and the station is now used as an office space for CNR, and was once the intercity bus terminal.

The building is designed in the International Style with a main entrance in the tower; passenger facilities, waiting room and washrooms at one end on the ground floor with baggage and parcel service at the other end; office space on upper floors; much of the original interior finishes, (terrazzo, plaster and linoleum) still services.

The building was designated a historic railway station in 1995.

== See also ==
- List of designated heritage railway stations of Canada
