= Ashby Street Car Barn =

- U.S. National Register of Historic Places
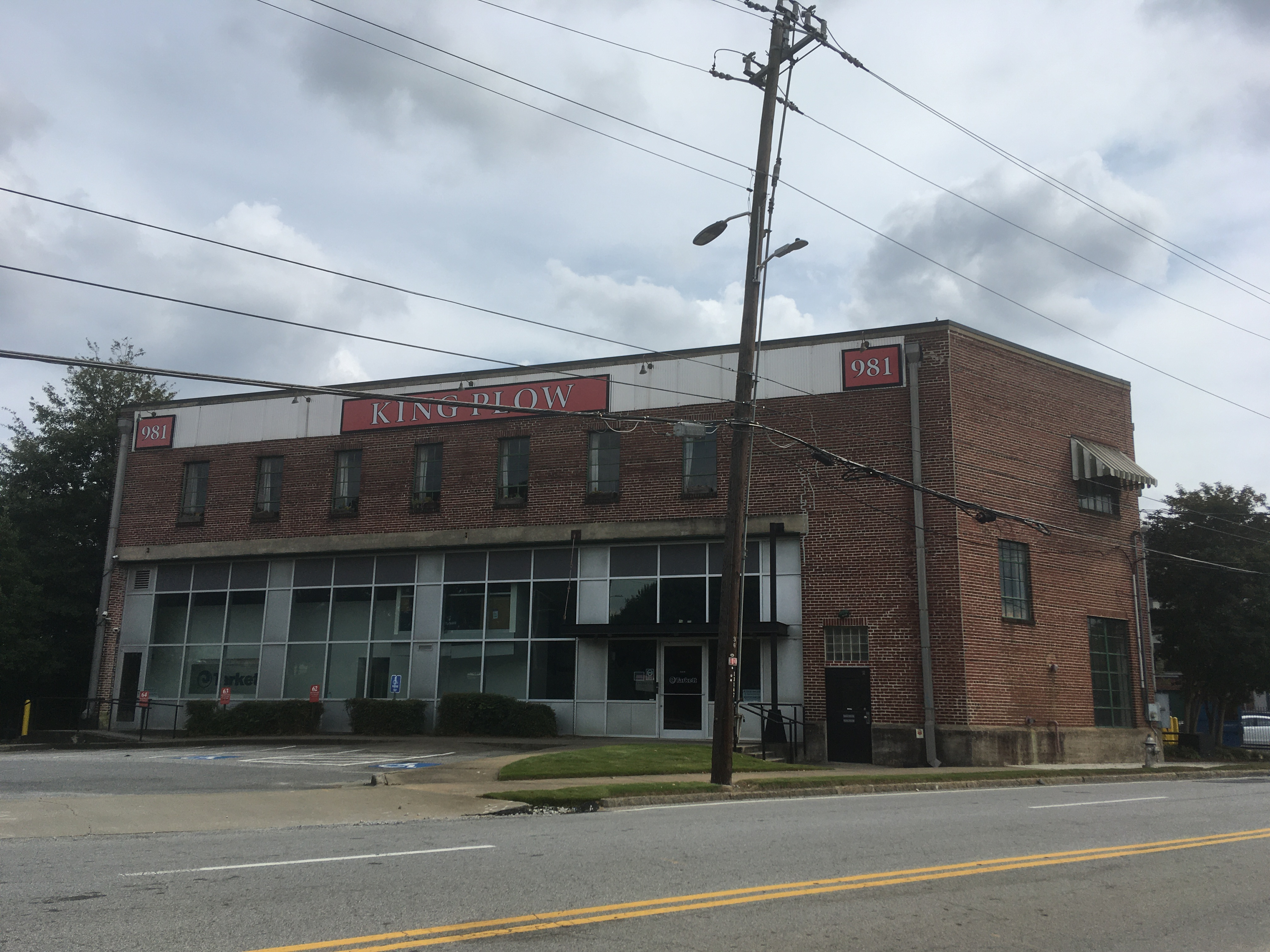

- Location within Atlanta
- Location: 981 Ashby Street Northwest, Atlanta, Georgia
- Coordinates: 33.7815°N 84.4169°W
- Built: 1927
- Built by: Atlanta Northern Railway Company
- NRHP reference No.: 98000972
- Added to NRHP: August 6, 1998

Ashby Street Car Barn, locally known as the Ashby Street Trolley Barn, is a historic interurban carhouse in Atlanta, Georgia. It was constructed by the Atlanta Northern Railway Company in 1927, replacing a previous structure built in 1904. The carhouse was the major maintenance facility for the Atlanta/Marietta interurban, which ran until January 31, 1947. It had six parallel tracks inside.

The carhouse was renovated in 1998 and 1999 for use as lofts and a brewery, as part of the King Plow Arts Center project. It was added to the National Register of Historic Places on August 6, 1998.

== See also ==
- National Register of Historic Places listings in Fulton County, Georgia
