= Union Station (Winnipeg) =

Railway station in Manitoba, Canada

- The main entrance to Union Station

General information
- Location: 123 Main Street; Winnipeg, Manitoba; R3C 1A3
- Coordinates: 49°53′20″N 97°08′03″W
- Owner: Via Rail
- Platforms: 3
- Tracks: 8
- Connections: Winnipeg Transit; BLUE FX2 FX3 D14 D15

Construction
- Structure type: Staffed station; Beaux-Arts building
- Parking: Privately operated
- Accessible: Yes
- Architect: Warren and Wetmore

Other information
- Station code: Via Rail: WNPG; IATA: XEF

History
- Opened: 1911

Services
Preceding station	Via Rail	Following station
Portage la Prairie toward Vancouver	The Canadian	Elma toward Toronto
Portage la Prairie toward Churchill	Winnipeg–Churchill	Terminus
Former services
Preceding station	Via Rail	Following station
Portage la Prairie toward Vancouver	The Canadian before 1990	Whitemouth toward Toronto or Montreal
Preceding station	Canadian National Railway	Following station
Portage la Prairie toward Vancouver	Main Line	Transcona toward Montreal
Portage la Prairie toward Edmonton	Edmonton – Winnipeg via North Battleford and Regina	Terminus
Portage la Prairie toward North Battleford	North Battleford – Winnipeg via Swan River and Hallboro	Terminus
St. Charles toward Calgary	Calgary – Winnipeg	Terminus
West Winnipeg toward Portage la Prairie	Cabot Branch	Terminus
Westside toward Gypsumville	Gypsumville – Winnipeg	Terminus
Terminus	Winnipeg – Port Arthur	St. Boniface toward Port Arthur
Terminus	Winnipeg – Victoria Beach	West Transcona toward Victoria Beach
Preceding station	Northern Pacific Railway	Following station
Terminus	Winnipeg – St. Paul	Portage Junction toward St. Paul

National Historic Site of Canada
- Official name: Union Station / Winnipeg Railway Station (Canadian National)
- Designated: 1976
- Reference no.: 4484

Heritage Railway Station (Canada)
- Designated: 1989
Location

Union Station is the inter-city railway station for Winnipeg, Manitoba, Canada. It is a grand beaux-arts structure situated near The Forks in downtown Winnipeg, and was designated a National Historic Site of Canada in 1976. The station is also a Heritage Railway Station, so designated since 1989.

== History ==
=== Initial construction ===
Constructed between 1908 and 1911, the station was built as a joint venture between the Canadian Northern Railway, National Transcontinental, Grand Trunk Pacific Railway, and the Dominion government. The first train to enter the station did so on 7 August 1911, with the official opening the following year on 24 June 1912.

Union Station was designed by Warren and Wetmore, the architects responsible for Grand Central Terminal in New York City. Designed in the Beaux-Arts style and constructed from local Tyndall limestone, Union Station was one of Western Canada's largest railway stations.

The building extends for 110 metres along Main Street, with the entrance close to the intersection of Main Street and Broadway. The building's entrance doors are located under a decorative iron canopy that projects from the austere white limestone. Atop the building is a large dome.

=== Use ===
Union Station was for many years an important transportation hub in the region. Thousands of immigrants passed through its halls, and it was home to the regional office of the Canadian National Railway which inherited the building from its predecessors. There were once several trans-border trains to Minneapolis-St. Paul, Minnesota operating out of Winnipeg. The Great Northern Railway had its Winnipeg Limited, while the Northern Pacific Railway also had an unnamed day train. All of these services were discontinued prior to Amtrak and there are no present plans to reinstate any of them.

Canadian National Railway turned over passenger rail services to Via Rail in 1978, which has operated out of Union Station ever since. At present, Union Station is used by two trains - the Toronto-Vancouver Canadian, and the Winnipeg – Churchill train.

Although it is still used as a passenger train terminal, the functions of Union Station have changed with time. For instance, the terminal building contains offices occupied by non-railway tenants. The trainshed, which includes a total of eight through tracks and four passenger platforms, houses the Winnipeg Railway Museum on two tracks and two platforms. It is a variation of Bush-type shed designed by Lincoln Bush.

Union Station is one of two major inter-city railway station buildings in Downtown Winnipeg. However, unlike Union Station, the Canadian Pacific Railway Station ceased functioning as a railway station upon the creation of Via Rail Canada in 1978 and is now used for purposes unrelated to transportation.

=== Renovation ===
During 2011, Via Rail undertook a $3 million renovation of the station, composed largely of repairs to the roof and trainshed, as well as various improvements to increase the energy efficiency of the building.

Renovations have included the installation of a new roof, the upgrade and insulation of the main roof from R0 to R25 and the replacement of low efficiency boilers with 3 high efficiency near condensing boilers. Due to renovations, the gas consumption in the building has been reduced by 82%, electrical consumption has been reduced by 25%, and water consumption has been reduced by 2 million gallons per year since 1990. The heating costs for the 248,000 square feet (23,000 m^{2}) building have been reduced to 67 cents per square foot / year, which is well below the requirement of $1 per square foot / year for the Manitoba eco-efficiency rating. The renovated building has received the BOMA BESt Level 2 designation. Since the environmental upgrades, the building has won the Building Owners and Managers Association of Manitoba (BOMA) 2012 Earth Award for Multi-Use Building.

A further $6.5 million in renovations were completed in 2014, including renovations to the passenger waiting areas, accessible public washrooms, improvement of the East entrance, repair and repainting of the rotunda, as well as various safety improvements.

=== East Yard ===
Across the tracks from the station was the CNR East Yard (opened in 1888 for Northern Pacific and Manitoba Railway), which was partially replaced by the Symington Yards in 1962 and finally closed around the 1980s as parking lot and The Forks.

=== Future plans ===
Future plans call for the Winnipeg Railway Museum to be moved elsewhere in the metro area to make way for a rapid transit hub station where several routes that cross the city will meet.

== Gallery ==
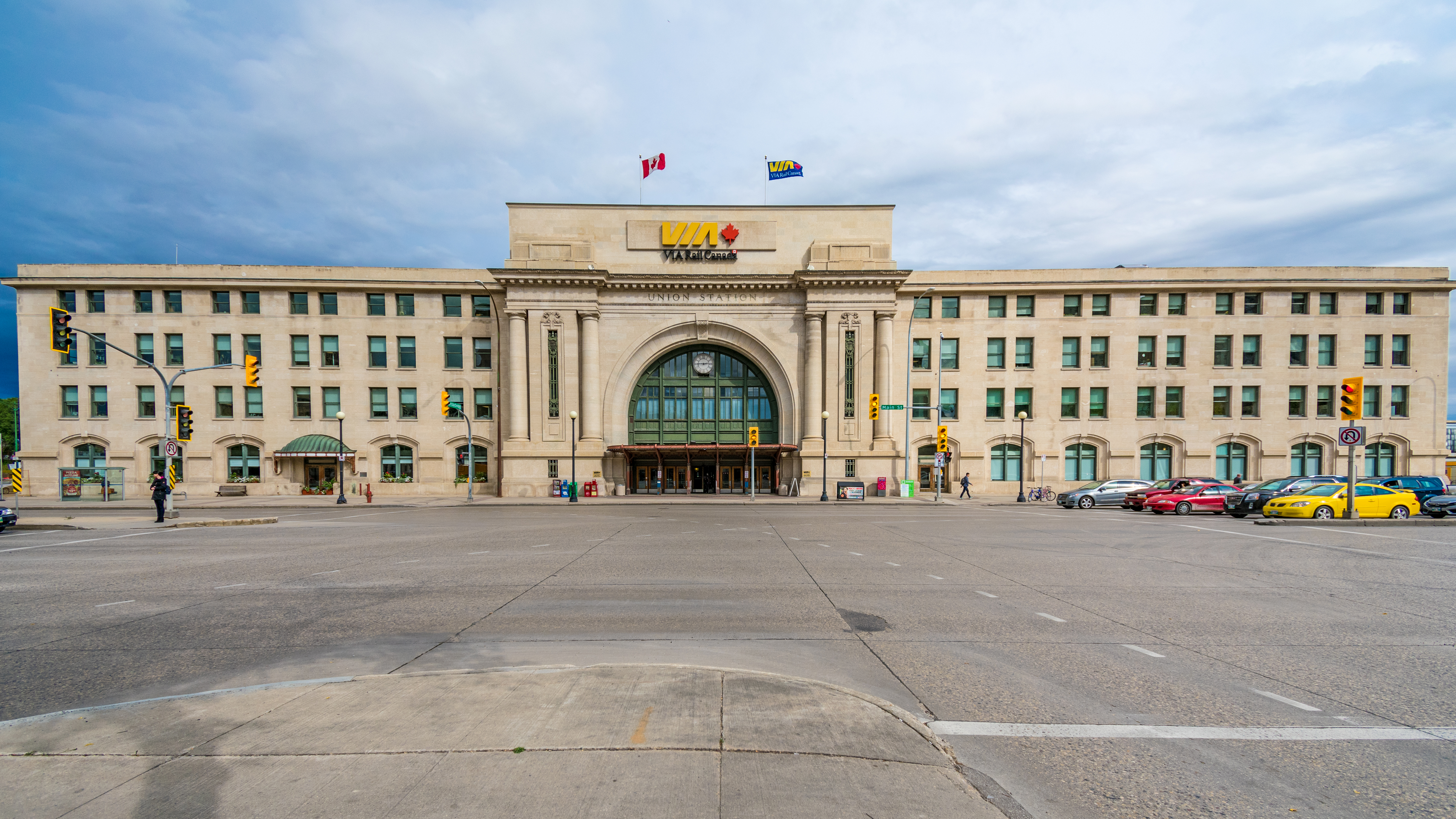
View of Union Station from Broadway (2017)

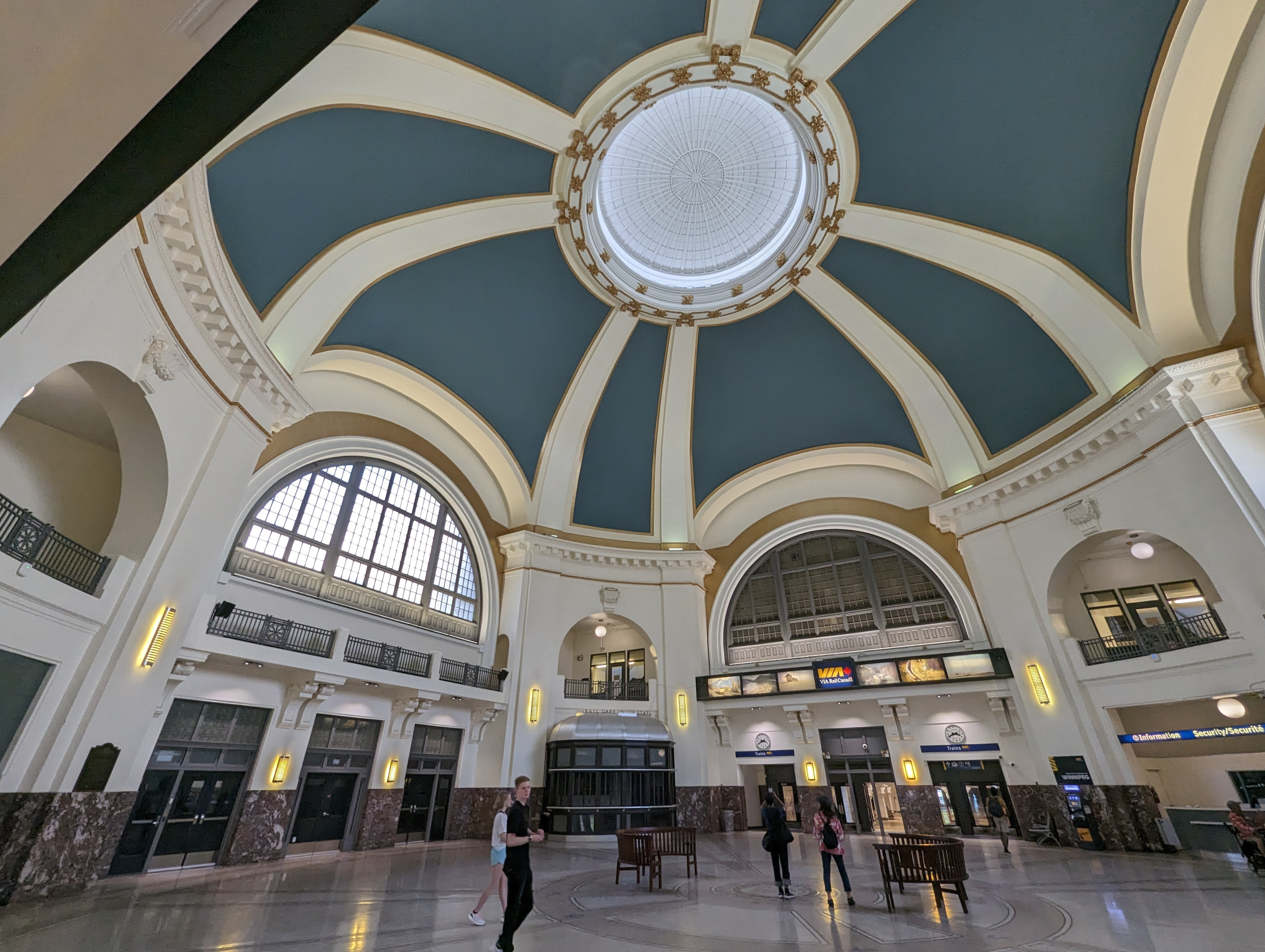
Main Hall of Union Station

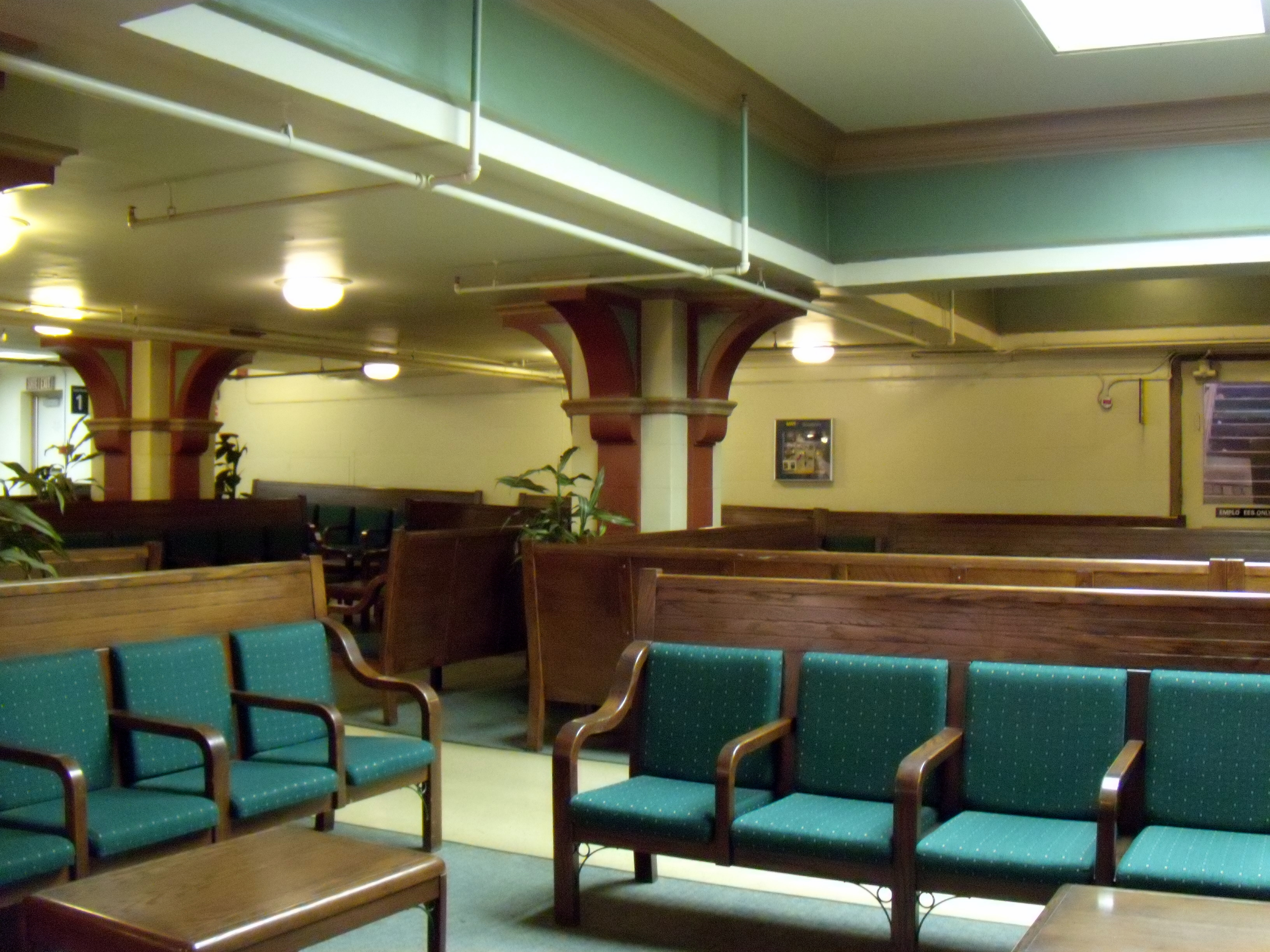
Economy passenger lounge

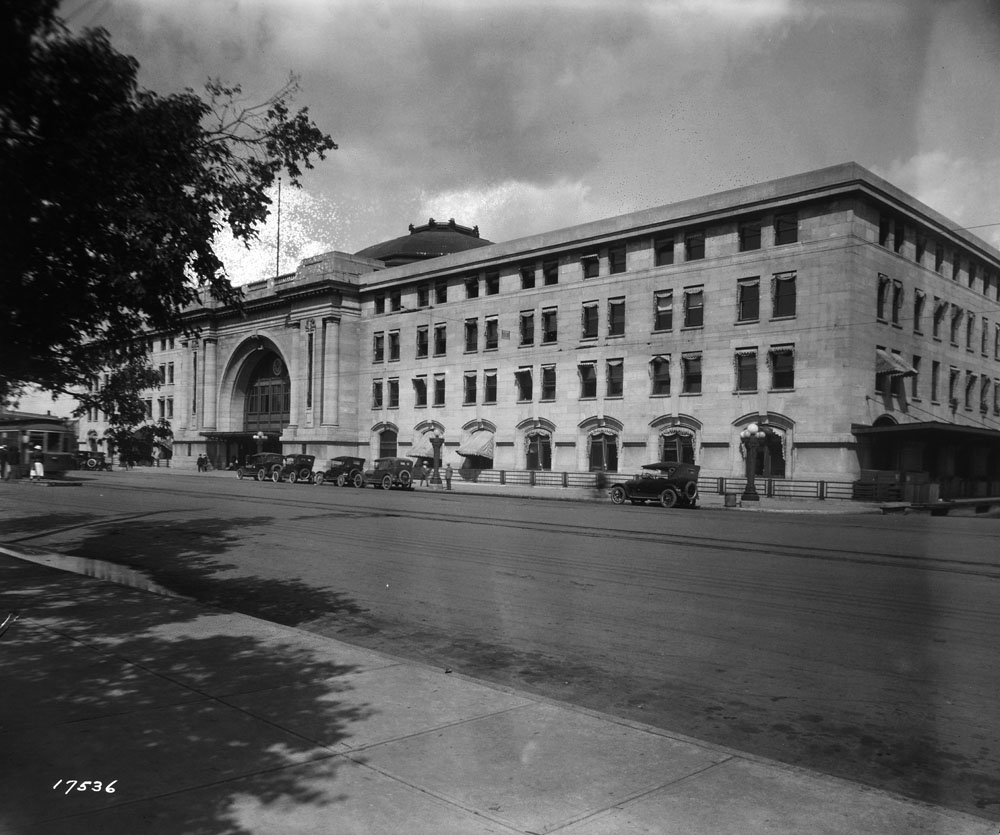
Historical photo of entrance of Union Station
