= Manitoba Provincial Road 354 =

Provincial road in Manitoba, Canada

Provincial Road 354
- PR 354 highlighted in red

Route information
- Maintained by Department of Infrastructure
- Length: 108.9 km (67.7 mi)
- Existed: 1966–present

Major junctions
- North end: PTH 10 / PR 262 at Onanole
- PTH 45 in Elphinstone PTH 16 (TCH) / YH in Strathclair PTH 24 in Oak River
- South end: Canadian National Railway main line near Bradwardine

Location
- Country: Canada
- Province: Manitoba
- Rural municipalities: Harrison Park; Oakview; Yellowhead

Highway system
- Provincial highways in Manitoba; Winnipeg City Routes
← PR 353	→ PR 355

Provincial Road 354 (PR 354) is a 108.9-kilometre-long (67.7 mi) north-south provincial road in the Westman Region of the Canadian province of Manitoba.

== Route description ==
PR 354 begins at PTH 10 and PR 262 at Onanole, and terminates at the Canadian National Railway main line near Bradwardine.

From Onanole, it travels 7 kilometres (4.3 mi) west before meeting southbound PR 270. From PR 270, PR 354 turns north for 6 kilometres (3.7 mi) before turning west through the community of Crawford Park. The road then continues west for 5 kilometres (3.1 mi) before meeting southbound PR 250. The road continues west for another 13 kilometres (8.1 mi) before turning south at the unincorporated community of Horod. Approximately 5 kilometres (3.1 mi) south of Horod, the road meets eastbound PR 470. The two roads run in concurrence for 2 kilometres (1.2 mi) before PR 470 turns west and leaves the concurrence. PR 354 continues south for 8 kilometres (5.0 mi) to an intersection with PTH 45 at Elphinstone. After leaving Elphinstone, the road continues south for 15 kilometres (9.3 mi) to meet PTH 16 east of Strathclair. PTH 16 and PR 354 continue in concurrence west for 4 kilometres (2.5 mi) to Strathclair where PR 354 leaves the concurrence and continues south, travelling 18 kilometres (11 mi) to meet eastbound PR 355. The two roads run in concurrence for 2 kilometres (1.2 mi) before PR 354 leaves the concurrence and continues south, travelling 12 kilometres (7.5 mi) to meet PTH 24 east of Oak River. PTH 24 and PR 354 continue in concurrence west for 2 kilometres (1.2 mi) through Oak River before PR 354 leaves the concurrence just west of the village and continues south, travelling 8 kilometres (5.0 mi) to its southbound terminus.

The route is gravel for most its length, with a paved section covering the first 5 kilometres (3.1 mi) from its northern terminus along with the concurrence it shares with PTH 16 and PTH 24.

== History ==
In the early 1990s, the Manitoba government decommissioned a number of provincial secondary roads and returned the maintenance of these roads back to the rural municipalities. A portion of the original PR 354 was included in this decommissioning. However, unlike most provincial roads in which the length was shortened or the route decommissioned altogether, PR 354 was slightly lengthened from its original distance.

Prior to this, PR 354's northern terminus was at Horod with PR 359. The road extended another 4 kilometres (2.5 mi) past its current southern terminus to meet eastbound PR 259. The two roads continued in a western concurrence for 2 kilometres (1.2 mi) before turning south, travelling 5 kilometres (3.1 mi) through Bradwardine before PR 259 turned west and left the concurrence. PR 354 continued south for 15 kilometres (9.3 mi) to its southbound terminus with PTH 21 near the Sioux Valley Dakota Nation.

After the decommissioning of the original section, PR 354 was rerouted east onto the former PR 359, which was significantly shortened from its original length. The road travelled on this section to meet PR 270.

PR 270 was initially extended on to the section between PR 354's current northern terminus and the current junction between the two roads; it was changed to PR 354 in 1997. This section includes the former PR 263, which was decommissioned in its entirety.

The section between PR 259 and its old southbound terminus was redesignated as PR 564. The section between PR 259 and PR 354's current southern terminus is now a municipal road.

The original length of PR 354 was 113 kilometres (70 mi).

== Major intersections ==
Division	Location	km	mi	Destinations	Notes
Riverdale / Oakview boundary	Norman	0.0	0.0	Road 130W to PR 259 – Bradwardine	End of provincial maintenance at Canadian National Railway crossing; road continues south as Road 130W (former PR 354 south)
Oakview	Oak River	8.2	5.1	PTH 24 west – Hamiota	Southern end of PTH 24 concurrency
Oakview		9.9	6.2	PTH 24 east – Rapid City	Northern end of PTH 24 concurrency
Oakview		13.9	8.6	Road 80N – Hamiota	Former PR 469 west
Oakview		14.0	8.7	Bridge over the Oak River	
Oakview		21.3	13.2	PR 355 west – Decker	Southern end of PR 355 concurrency
Oakview	Brumlie	23.1	14.4	PR 355 east – Cardale	Northern end of PR 355 concurrency
Yellowhead	Strathclair	41.7	25.9	PTH 16 (TCH) west / YH – Shoal Lake	Southern end of PTH 16 concurrency
Yellowhead		44.7	27.8	PTH 16 (TCH) east / YH – Newdale	Northern end of PTH 16 concurrency
Yellowhead		54.5	33.9	Bridge over the Little Saskatchewan River	
Yellowhead	Elphinstone	60.0	37.3	PTH 45 (Russell Subdivision Trail) – Oakburn, Sandy Lake	
Yellowhead	Elphinstone	60.4	37.5	Bridge over the Little Saskatchewan River	
Yellowhead	Elphinstone	60.8	37.8	Railway Street	Former PTH 45 west
Yellowhead	Elphinstone	62.0	38.5	2nd Street E	Former PTH 45 east
Yellowhead / Harrison Park boundary		69.2	43.0	PR 470 west	Southern end of PR 470 concurrency
Harrison Park		70.9	44.1	PR 470 east – Stuart Lake	Northern end of PR 470 concurrency
Harrison Park	Horod	76.1	47.3	Horod Road – Olha, Rossburn	Former PR 359 west
Harrison Park		82.4	51.2	Bridge over the Little Saskatchewan River	
Harrison Park		83.8	52.1	Lake Audy Road – Lake Audy	Access road into Riding Mountain National Park
Harrison Park		90.5	56.2	PR 250 south – Sandy Lake	Northern terminus of PR 250
Harrison Park		102.0	63.4	PR 270 south – Basswood	Northern terminus of PR 270
Harrison Park		105.3	65.4	Reid Road – Clear Lake	Former PR 263 north
Harrison Park	Onanole	108.9	67.7	PTH 10 (John Bracken Highway) – Wasagaming, Erickson; PR 262 south (Whirlpool Drive)	Northern terminus of PR 354 and PR 262; PR 262 southbound is former PR 263 east
1.000 mi = 1.609 km; 1.000 km = 0.621 mi: Concurrency terminus
