= Manitoba Highway 45 =

Provincial highway in Manitoba, Canada

Provincial Trunk Highway 45
- Russell Subdivision Trail
- PTH 45 highlighted in red

Route information
- Maintained by Department of Infrastructure
- Length: 106 km (66 mi)
- Existed: 1959–present

Major junctions
- West end: PTH 16 (TCH) / PTH 83 / YH at Russell
- PTH 21 / PR 577 at Oakburn
- East end: PTH 10 near Erickson

Location
- Country: Canada
- Province: Manitoba
- Rural municipalities: Clanwilliam – Erickson; Harrison Park; Riding Mountain West; Rossburn; Russell – Binscarth; Yellowhead

Highway system
- Provincial highways in Manitoba; Winnipeg City Routes
← PTH 44	→ PTH 49

Provincial Trunk Highway 45 (PTH 45) is a provincial highway in the Parkland Region of the Canadian province of Manitoba. It runs from PTH 16 and PTH 83 in the town of Russell to PTH 10 five kilometres (3.1 mi) north of the village of Erickson.

PTH 45 provides an alternate route to Riding Mountain National Park for travellers coming from Saskatchewan and the western part of Manitoba as opposed to taking the Yellowhead Highway to Minnedosa and PTH 10 north.

PTH 45 is officially named the Russell Subdivision Trail. The speed limit is 100 km/h (62.5 mph).

== Route description ==
PTH 45 begins in the Rural Municipality of Russell - Binscarth in Russell at an intersection with PTH 16 / PTH 83 at the southeastern corner of town. It passes by some businesses before heading through rural farmland to leave Russell and enter the Rural Municipality of Riding Mountain West. The highway curves southeastward as it passes through the communities of Silverton and Angusville, crossing PR 478 and PR 476 prior to entering the Rossburn Municipality.

PTH 45 travels through the Waywayseecappo First Nation, crossing a lake (via causeway) and the Birdtail River, as well as passing through the main business district of the reserve. The highway then goes through several switchbacks as it leaves the First Nation and travels through the town of Rossburn, where it has an intersection with PR 264 (Main Street), and the community of Vista. Crossing into the Rural Municipality of Yellowhead, PTH 45 bypasses the town of Oakburn along its north side, having a junction between PTH 21 and PR 577, before travelling southeast through farmland for the next several kilometres. It passes through Menzie, where it has an intersection with PR 566, on its way to bypass the town of Elphinstone on its south side, crossing the Little Saskatchewan River and having an intersection with PR 354.

Entering the Rural Municipality of Harrison Park, PTH 45 passes by Sandy Lake, where it junctions with PR 250, and Rackham, where it junctions with PR 270, as it travels past several lakes over the next several kilometres, crossing one of them via a causeway. The highway crosses the Trans Canada Trail, entering the Rural Municipality of Clanwilliam - Erickson, and coming to an end shortly thereafter at an intersection with PTH 10 (John Bracken Highway) 5 kilometres (3.1 mi) north of Erickson.

The entire length of Manitoba Highway 45 is a rural, paved, two-lane highway.

== History ==
When the highway was first designated in 1959, PTH 45 was dubbed derisively by some locals as "The Turkey Trail". This was due to its narrow and winding nature at the time, which resembled the winding bush paths commonly found on Prairie farms. This, along with some very sharp curves in the western section between Elphinstone and Russell, increased the travel time along this route. By 1966, the highway had been realigned to closely follow the Canadian National Railway (CNR) Rossburn Subdivision line, removing the sharp curves and unnecessary turns and allowing the highway to be more streamlined for safer travel.

== Major intersections ==
Division	Location	km	mi	Destinations	Notes
Russell – Binscarth	Russell	0	0.0	PTH 16 (TCH) / PTH 83 / YH – Minnedosa, Yorkton	Western terminus
Riding Mountain West	Silverton	8	5.0	PR 478 – Binscarth, Esterhazy	
Riding Mountain West	Angusville	19	12	PR 476	
Rossburn	Rossburn	37	23	PR 264 – Rossburn, Deep Lake	formerly PR 254
Rossburn	Vista	47	29	Vista Road	formerly PR 472 south
Rossburn		48	30	Mile 110N	formerly PR 359
Yellowhead	Oakburn	58	36	PTH 21 south – Shoal Lake, Hamiota, Hartney; PR 577 north – Olha	formerly PR 566 north
Yellowhead	Menzie	65	40	PR 566 north (1st Avenue) – Seech Lake	formerly PR 470 north
Yellowhead		66	41	Mile 131W (Menzie Road)	formerly PR 470 south
Yellowhead	Elphinstone	77	48	PR 354 – Onanole, Strathclair	
Harrison Park	Sandy Lake	87	54	PR 250 – Crawford Park, Newdale	
Harrison Park		98	61	PR 270 – Onanole, Basswood	
Clanwilliam – Erickson		106	66	PTH 10 (John Bracken Highway) – Dauphin, Minnedosa	Eastern terminus
1.000 mi = 1.609 km; 1.000 km = 0.621 mi

== Related route ==
Provincial Road 566
- 1st Avenue, Road 130W, Road 114N
- Location: Menzie - Olha
- Length: 22.1 km (13.7 mi)
- Existed: 1992–present

Provincial Road 566 (PR 566) is a 22.1-kilometre-long (13.7 mi) north–south spur of PTH 45, connecting the hamlets of Menzie and Olha via Rogers and Seech. It also provides access to the Swystun Pioneer Settlement Park via Road 112N. Within Menzie, it is known as 1st Avenue.

PR 566 begins within the Rural Municipality of Yellowhead at an intersection with PTH 45 (Russell Subdivision Trail) within the hamlet of Menzie, travelling through the community along 1st Avenue before heading due north along Road 130W, crossing Road 105N (which leads to the Holy Transfiguration Ukrainian Church Historic Site), and entering the Municipality of Harrison Park at an intersection with PR 470. It travels through the locality of Rogers, crossing Rossburn Road (which leads to Vista) before having an intersection with Road 112N (which leads to Swystun Pioneer Heritage Park) and Horod Road (which leads to Horod). The highway now makes a sharp left onto Road 114N as it passes through Seech, now travelling due west for a few kilometres through rural farmland to enter the Rossburn Municipality before coming to an end at an intersection with PR 577 just north of Olha. The entire length of PR 566 is a gravel, two-lane road.

Provincial Road 566
- Location: Oakburn - Olha
- Length: 13.7 km (8.5 mi)
- Existed: 1966–1992

Prior to 1992, PR 566 ran along what is now PR 577 between PTH 45 / PTH 21 near Oakburn to the PR 566 / PR 577 intersection north of Olha. What is currently PR 566 was a collection of different highways, consisting of former portions of PR 470, PR 359, as well as PR 577 and a short section of municipal Road 130W.

Division	Location	km	mi	Destinations	Notes
Yellowhead	Menzie	0.0	0.0	PTH 45 (Russell Subdivision Trail) – Elphinstone, Oakburn	Southern terminus; former PR 470 south
Yellowhead		2.4	1.5	Road 105N – Holy Transfiguration Ukrainian Orthodox Church Historic Site	
Yellowhead / Harrison Park boundary		7.3	4.5	PR 470 east – Stuart Lake	Western terminus of PR 470
Harrison Park	Rogers	10.6	6.6	Rossburn Road – Vista	Former PR 359 west
Harrison Park		13.9	8.6	Road 112N – Swystun Pioneer Settlement Park; Horod Road – Horod	Former PR 359 east
Harrison Park		15.5	9.6	Road 113N – Seech Lake	
Harrison Park	Seech	17.2	10.7	Road 114N – Seech	
Rossburn		22.1	13.7	PR 577 – Olha, Oakburn, Rossman Lake	Northern terminus
1.000 mi = 1.609 km; 1.000 km = 0.621 mi
