= List of postal codes of Canada: R =

This is a list of postal codes in Canada where the first letter is R. Postal codes beginning with R are located within the Canadian province of Manitoba. Only the first three characters are listed, corresponding to the Forward Sortation Area (FSA).

Canada Post provides a free postal code look-up tool on its website, via its applications for such smartphones as the iPhone and BlackBerry, and sells hard-copy directories and CD-ROMs. Many vendors also sell validation tools, which allow customers to properly match addresses and postal codes. Hard-copy directories can also be consulted in all post offices, and some libraries.

== Manitoba ==
There are currently 77 FSAs in this list.

=== Urban ===
R1A; Selkirk	R2A; Not assigned	R3A; Winnipeg (Centennial)	R4A; West St. Paul	R5A; St. Adolphe	R6A; Not assigned	R7A; Brandon; East and vicinity	R8A; Flin Flon	R9A; The Pas
R1B; Lockport	R2B; Not assigned	R3B; Winnipeg (Chinatown / Civic Centre / Exchange District / University of Winnipeg)	R4B; Centreport	R5B; Not assigned	R6B; Not assigned	R7B; Brandon; South	R8B; Not assigned	R9B; Not assigned
R1C; Narol / West Pine Ridge	R2C; Winnipeg (Transcona)	R3C; Winnipeg (Broadway / The Forks / Portage and Main) Manitoba Provincial Government	R4C; Not assigned	R5C; Not assigned	R6C; Not assigned	R7C; Brandon; Northwest	R8C; Not assigned	R9C; Not assigned
R1E; Not assigned	R2E; East St. Paul	R3E; Winnipeg (Sargent Park / Daniel McIntyre / Inkster SE)	R4E; Not assigned	R5E; Not assigned	R6E; Not assigned	R7E; Not assigned	R8E; Not assigned	R9E; Not assigned
R1G; Not assigned	R2G; Winnipeg (North Kildonan North)	R3G; Winnipeg (Minto / St. Mathews / Wolseley)	R4G; Oak Bluff	R5G; Steinbach	R6G; Not assigned	R7G; Not assigned	R8G; Not assigned	R9G; Not assigned
R1H; Not assigned	R2H; Winnipeg (St. Boniface NW)	R3H; Winnipeg (St. James-Assiniboia NE / YWG)	R4H; Headingley; East	R5H; Ste. Anne	R6H; Not assigned	R7H; Not assigned	R8H; Not assigned	R9H; Not assigned
R1J; Not assigned	R2J; Winnipeg (St. Boniface NE)	R3J; Winnipeg (St. James-Assiniboia SE)	R4J; Headingley; West	R5J; Ste-Geneviève	R6J; Not assigned	R7J; Not assigned	R8J; Not assigned	R9J; Not assigned
R1K; Not assigned	R2K; Winnipeg (East Kildonan)	R3K; Winnipeg (St. James-Assiniboia SW)	R4K; Cartier	R5K; Lorette	R6K; Not assigned	R7K; Not assigned	R8K; Not assigned	R9K; Not assigned
R1L; Not assigned	R2L; Winnipeg (Elmwood)	R3L; Winnipeg (River Heights East)	R4L; St. Francois Xavier	R5L; Anola	R6L; Not assigned	R7L; Not assigned	R8L; Not assigned	R9L; Not assigned
R1M; Not assigned	R2M; Winnipeg (St. Vital North)	R3M; Winnipeg (Crescentwood Central)	R4M; Not assigned	R5M; Cooks Creek	R6M; Morden	R7M; Not assigned	R8M; Not assigned	R9M; Not assigned
R1N; Portage la Prairie	R2N; Winnipeg (St. Vital SW)	R3N; Winnipeg (River Heights West)	R4N; Not assigned	R5N; Oakbank	R6N; Not assigned	R7N; Dauphin	R8N; Thompson	R9N; Not assigned
R1P; Not assigned	R2P; Winnipeg (Old Kildonan)	R3P; Winnipeg (Fort Garry NW / Tuxedo)	R4P; Not assigned	R5P; Dugald	R6P; Stanley	R7P; Not assigned	R8P; Not assigned	R9P; Not assigned
R1R; Not assigned	R2R; Winnipeg (Inkster West)	R3R; Winnipeg (Assiniboine South / Betsworth)	R4R; Not assigned	R5R; Sunnyside (RM of Springfield)	R6R; Not assigned	R7R; Not assigned	R8R; Not assigned	R9R; Not assigned
R1S; Not assigned	R2S; Not assigned	R3S; Winnipeg (Wilkes South)	R4S; Not assigned	R5S; Not assigned	R6S; Not assigned	R7S; Not assigned	R8S; Not assigned	R9S; Not assigned
R1T; Not assigned	R2T; Not assigned	R3T; Winnipeg (Fort Garry NE / University of Manitoba)	R4T; Not assigned	R5T; Navin (RM of Springfield)	R6T; Stanley (created August 2021)	R7T; Not assigned	R8T; Not assigned	R9T; Not assigned
R1V; Not assigned	R2V; Winnipeg (West Kildonan)	R3V; Winnipeg (Fort Garry South)	R4V; Not assigned	R5V; Not assigned	R6V; Not assigned	R7V; Not assigned	R8V; Not assigned	R9V; Not assigned
R1W; Not assigned	R2W; Winnipeg (Point Douglas East)	R3W; Winnipeg (Grassie / Eastern North Kildonan)	R4W; Not assigned	R5W; Not assigned	R6W; Winkler	R7W; Not assigned	R8W; Not assigned	R9W; Not assigned
R1X; Not assigned	R2X; Winnipeg (Point Douglas West / Inkster East)	R3X; Winnipeg (St. Boniface South / St. Vital SE)	R4X; Not assigned	R5X; Not assigned	R6X; Not assigned	R7X; Not assigned	R8X; Not assigned	R9X; Not assigned
R1Y; Not assigned	R2Y; Winnipeg (St. James-Assiniboia NW)	R3Y; Winnipeg (Fort Garry West)	R4Y; Not assigned	R5Y; Not assigned	R6Y; Not assigned	R7Y; Not assigned	R8Y; Not assigned	R9Y; Not assigned
R1Z; Not assigned	R2Z; Not assigned	R3Z; Not assigned	R4Z; Not assigned	R5Z; Not assigned	R6Z; Not assigned	R7Z; Not assigned	R8Z; Not assigned	R9Z; Not assigned

=== Rural ===
R0A
Southeastern Manitoba

0A1: Niverville
0B0: Arnaud
0C0: Blumenort
0G0: Carlowrie
0H0: Dominion City
0J0: Dufresne
0K0: Dufrost
0L0: Emerson
0M0: Gardenton
0N0: Giroux
0P0: Green Ridge
0R0: Grunthal
0S0: Halbstadt
0T0: Ile Des Chenes
0V0: Kleefeld
0W0: La Broquerie
0X0: Landmark
0Y0: Lorette
0Z0: Marchand
1A0: Menisino
1B0: Middlebro
1C0: New Bothwell
1E0: Niverville
1G0: Otterburne
1H0: Overstoneville
1J0: Pansy
1K0: Piney
1L0: Randolph
1M0: Ridgeville
1N0: Rosa
1P0: Roseau River
1T0: St. Malo
1V0: St. Pierre Jolys
1W0: Sandilands
1X0: Sarto
1Y0: South Junction
1Z0: Sprague
2B0: Stuartburn
2C0: Sundown
2E0: Tolstoi
2G0: Tourond
2J0: Vassar
2K0: Vita
2M0: Woodmore
2N0: Woodridge
2P0: Zhoda
2R0: Ginew
2W0: Buffalo Point

R0B
Northern Manitoba

0A0: Berens River
0B0: Brochet
0E0: Churchill
0G0: Cormorant
0H0: Cranberry Portage
0J0: Cross Lake
0L0: Gillam
0M0: Gods Lake Narrows
0N0: Gods River
0S0: Ilford
0T0: Island Lake
0V0: Little Grand Rapids
0W0: Lynn Lake
0Y0: Moose Lake
0Z0: Negginan
1A0: Nelson House
1B0: Norway House
1C0: Oxford House
1E0: Pikwitonei
1G0: Pukatawagan
1H0: Red Sucker Lake
1J0: St. Theresa Point
1K0: Shamattawa
1L0: Sherridon
1M0: Snow Lake
1N0: South Indian Lake
1P0: Split Lake
1R0: Thicket Portage
1S0: Wabowden
1T0: Wanless
1W0: Leaf Rapids
1Z0: Wasagamack
2B0: York Landing
2C0: Tadoule Lake
2E0: Lac Brochet
2G0: Pauingassi
2H0: Stevenson Island
2J0: Opaskwayak

R0C
North Interlake

0A0: Arborg
0B0: Argyle
0C0: Arnes
0E0: Ashern
0H0: Balmoral
0J0: Bloodvein
0K0: Broad Valley
0M0: Camp Morton
0N0: Chatfield
0P0: Clandeboye
0S0: Dallas
0V0: Easterville
0W0: Eriksdale
0X0: Fairford
0Y0: Faulkner
0Z0: Fisher Branch
1A0: Fraserwood
1B0: Gimli
1C0: Grahamdale
1E0: Grand Rapids
1G0: Grosse Isle
1H0: Gunton
1J0: Gypsumville
1L0: Hilbre
1N0: Hodgson
1P0: Inwood
1R0: Komarno
1S0: Koostatak
1T0: Lake Francis
1V0: Little Bullhead
1Y0: Lundar
1Z0: Malonton
2A0: Matheson Island
2B0: Matlock
2C0: Meleb
2E0: Moosehorn
2G0: Mulvihill
2H0: Narcisse
2J0: Oak Point
2K0: Oakview
2L0: Petersfield
2N0: Poplarfield
2P0: Princess Harbour
2R0: Riverton
2S0: St. Laurent
2T0: St. Martin
2W0: Sandy Hook
2X0: Silver
2Y0: Steep Rock
2Z0: Stonewall
3A0: Stony Mountain
3B0: Teulon
3C0: Vogar
3E0: Warren
3G0: Winnipeg Beach
3H0: Woodlands
3J0: Peguis
3K0: Lake Manitoba First Nation

R0E
Eastern Manitoba

0A0: Anola
0B0: Beaconia
0C0: Beausejour
0E0: Bélair
0J0: Bissett
0K0: Dugald
0L0: East Braintree
0M0: East Selkirk
0N0: Falcon Beach
0P0: Fort Alexander
0R0: Garson
0T0: Grand Marais
0V0: Great Falls
0X0: Hadashville
0Y0: Hazelridge
0Z0: Elma
1A0: Lac Du Bonnet
1C0: Libau
1E0: Manigotagan
1J0: Oakbank
1K0: O’Hanly
1L0: Pinawa
1M0: Pine Falls
1N0: Pointe du Bois
1P0: Powerview
1R0: Rennie
1S0: Richer
1T0: River Hills
1V0: St. Georges
1W0: Scanterbury
1X0: Seddons Corner
1Y0: Seven Sisters Falls
1Z0: Stead
2A0: Traverse Bay
2B0: Tyndall
2C0: Victoria Beach
2E0: Wanipigow
2G0: Whitemouth
2H0: Whiteshell

R0G
South Central Manitoba

0A0: Altamont
0B0: Altona
0C0: Aubigny
0E0: Brunkild
0G0: Bruxelles
0J0: Carman
0L0: Darlingford
0M0: Domain
0N0: Elm Creek
0P0: Fannystelle
0S0: Glenlea
0T0: Graysville
0V0: Gretna
0W0: Haywood
0X0: Holland
0Y0: Homewood
0Z0: Horndean
1A0: La Riviere
1B0: La Salle
1C0: Letellier
1E0: Lowe Farm
1G0: Manitou
1H0: Miami
1K0: Morris
1M0: Notre Dame de Lourdes
1N0: Oak Bluff
1P0: Pilot Mound
1R0: Plum Coulee
1S0: Rathwell
1T0: Roland
1V0: Roseisle
1W0: Rosenort
1X0: Rosenfeld
1Y0: Ste. Agathe
1Z0: St. Claude
2B0: St. Jean Baptiste
2C0: St. Joseph
2E0: St. Leon
2J0: Sanford
2K0: Snowflake
2L0: Somerset
2M0: Sperling
2N0: Springstein
2P0: Starbuck
2R0: Stephenfield
2S0: Swan Lake
2T0: Thornhill
2V0: Treherne
2W0: Vermette

R0H
South Interlake

0A0: Alonsa
0B0: Amaranth
0C0: Austin
0E0: Bagot
0G0: Edwin
0H0: Elie
0K0: High Bluff
0L0: Kinosota
0M0: Lakeland
0N0: Langruth
0P0: Lavenham
0R0: MacGregor
0S0: MacDonald
0T0: Marius
0V0: Marquette
0X0: Newton Siding
0Y0: Oakville
0Z0: Poplar Point
1C0: Rossendale
1E0: Rosser
1G0: St. Ambroise
1H0: St. Eustache
1K0: St. Mark's
1L0: Sidney
1M0: Silver Ridge
1N0: Southport
1P0: Westbourne
1R0: Woodside

R0J
Riding Mountain

0A0: Angusville
0B0: Arden
0E0: Bethany
0G0: Binscarth
0J0: Birnie
0K0: Clanwilliam
0L0: Dropmore
0M0: Eden
0N0: Elphinstone
0P0: Erickson
0R0: Foxwarren
0S0: Franklin
0T0: Gladstone
0V0: Glenella
0X0: Inglis
0Y0: Kelwood
0Z0: Lake Audy
1A0: Laurier
1B0: McCreary
1C0: Menzie
1E0: Minnedosa
1G0: Mountain Road
1H0: Neepawa
1J0: Newdale
1K0: Olha
1L0: Oakburn
1N0: Onanole
1P0: Plumas
1R0: Polonia
1S0: Waywayseecappo
1T0: Riding Mountain
1V0: Rossburn
1W0: Russell
1X0: Sandy Lake
1Y0: Shellmouth
1Z0: Shoal Lake
2B0: Solsgirth
2C0: Strathclair
2E0: Vista
2G0: Waldersee

R0K
Brandon Region

0A0: Alexander
0B0: Baldur
0C0: Belmont
0E0: Boissevain
0G0: Brookdale
0H0: Carberry
0J0: Cardale
0K0: Carroll
0L0: Cartwright
0M0: Clearwater
0N0: Crystal City
0P0: Cypress River
0R0: Douglas
0S0: Dunrea
0T0: Elgin
0V0: Fairfax
0W0: Forrest Station
0X0: Glenboro
0Y0: Glenora
1A0: Holmfield
1C0: Justice
1G0: Killarney
1J0: Margaret
1K0: Mariapolis
1L0: Mather
1M0: Minto
1P0: Nesbitt
1R0: Ninette
1S0: Ninga
1T0: Oak River
1W0: Rapid City
1X0: Rivers
1Z0: St. Alphonse
2A0: Shilo
2C0: Souris
2E0: Stockton
2G0: Wawanesa
2H0: Wellwood

R0L
Western Manitoba

0A0: Ashville
0B0: Barrows
0C0: Benito
0E0: Birch River
0G0: Boggy Creek
0H0: Bowsman
0J0: Camperville
0K0: Cayer
0L0: Cowan
0M0: Crane River
0N0: Duck Bay
0P0: Durban
0R0: Ebb and Flow
0S0: Eddystone
0T0: Ethelbert
0V0: Fork River
0W0: Garland
0X0: Gilbert Plains
0Y0: Grandview
0Z0: Kenville
1B0: Mafeking
1C0: Makinak
1E0: Meadow Portage
1G0: Minitonas
1K0: Ochre River
1L0: Pelican Rapids
1M0: Pine River
1N0: Renwer
1P0: Roblin
1R0: Rorketon
1S0: Ste. Rose du Lac
1T0: San Clara
1W0: Shortdale
1X0: Sifton
1Y0: Skownan
1Z0: Swan River
2A0: Toutes Aides
2B0: Valley River
2C0: Waterhen
2G0: Winnipegosis
2K0: Rock Ridge
2L0: Tootinaowaziibeeng

R0M
Southwestern Manitoba

0A0: Belleview
0B0: Beulah
0C0: Birtle
0E0: Bradwardine
0G0: Coulter
0H0: Crandall
0J0: Cromer
0K0: Decker
0L0: Deleau
0M0: Deloraine
0N0: Elkhorn
0R0: Goodlands
0S0: Griswold
0T0: Hamiota
0V0: Harding
0W0: Hargrave
0X0: Hartney
0Y0: Isabella
0Z0: Kenton
1A0: Kirkella
1B0: Kola
1C0: Lauder
1E0: Lenore
1G0: Lyleton
1H0: McAuley
1J0: Manson
1K0: Medora
1L0: Melita
1M0: Miniota
1N0: Napinka
1P0: Oak Lake
1S0: Pierson
1T0: Pipestone
1X0: Reston
1Y0: St. Lazare
2A0: Sinclair
2B0: Tilston
2C0: Virden
2E0: Waskada
2H0: Arrow River

R0N
Not in use
R0P
Not in use
R0R
Not in use
R0S
Not in use
R0T
Not in use
R0V
Not in use
R0W
Not in use
R0X
Not in use
R0Y
Not in use
R0Z
Not in use

== Least populated FSAs ==
1. R3H, 116
2. R1B, 280
3. R3S, 603
4. R5P, 738
5. R5T, 865
