= Manitoba Highway 16 =

Highway in Manitoba

Provincial Trunk Highway 16
- Trans-Canada Highway; Yellowhead Highway
- PTH 16 highlighted in red.

Route information
- Maintained by Manitoba Infrastructure
- Length: 266.5 km (165.6 mi)
- Existed: 1928–present

Major junctions
- West end: Highway 16 (TCH) at Saskatchewan border near Harrowby
- PTH 83 at Russell; PTH 45 near Russell; PTH 41 near Binscarth; PTH 83 near Foxwarren; PTH 42 at Shoal Lake; PTH 21 at Shoal Lake; PTH 10 near Minnedosa; PTH 5 at Neepawa; PTH 34 at Gladstone; PTH 50 near Westbourne
- East end: PTH 1 (TCH) / PR 305 near Portage la Prairie

Location
- Country: Canada
- Province: Manitoba
- Rural municipalities: Ellice – Archie; Glenella – Lansdowne; Harrison Park; Minto – Odanah; North Cypress – Langford; Oakview; Portage la Prairie; Prairie View; Russell – Binscarth; WestLake – Gladstone; Yellowhead
- Towns: Minnedosa; Neepawa

Highway system
- Provincial highways in Manitoba; Winnipeg City Routes
← PTH 15	→ PTH 16A

Provincial Trunk Highway 16 (PTH 16) is a provincial highway in the Canadian province of Manitoba. It is Manitoba's section of the Yellowhead Highway, and also the Trans-Canada Highway Yellowhead section. The main purpose of this highway is to connect Winnipeg with other Canadian cities such as Saskatoon and Edmonton. The highway runs from Bloom at an intersection with the Trans-Canada Highway and Provincial Road 305 ten kilometres (6.2 mi) west of Portage la Prairie to the Saskatchewan boundary sixteen kilometres (9.9 mi) west of Russell, where it continues as Saskatchewan Highway 16.

The highway is two lanes through Manitoba, with two small divided sections at the north and south junctions with PTH 10 around Minnedosa, which it runs in concurrence with just west of the town. PTH 16 is also twinned as it passes through Russell in concurrence with PTH 83, with northbound PTH 83 leaving/entering the concurrence at the western end of this section.

Twinning and upgrading to expressway status is being planned in the future.

== History ==
The route was known as PTH 4 until 1977, when it was renumbered to allow the entire length of the Yellowhead Highway to retain the number 16 designation across all four provinces of western Canada.

Between 1966 and 1979, PTH 16 was the designation of the route connecting Fisher Branch to PTH 7 near Fraserwood. This route became part of PR 231 and PR 228 in 1977. (This section of PR 228 would be transferred to PTH 17 in 1983).

The highway has had some reconfigurations in its time. When the highway first appeared on the 1928 Manitoba Highway Map, the highway's eastern terminus with PTH 1 was located in Portage la Prairie. From Portage la Prairie, the road traveled north following the current PR 240 to Mile 71N (formerly PR 249). The highway would then turn west and rejoin its current configuration just south of Macdonald. The junction was moved to its current location in 1950, and the old section was designated as PTH 4A between 1953 and 1965.

In the Minnedosa area, the section of highway from PTH 16A and PR 262 to Franklin Road (formerly PR 466 north) was constructed and opened to traffic in 1948. Prior to this, the highway turned north for two kilometres and then west past the hamlet of Franklin to Minnedosa, meeting PTH 10 south at the town limits. It then shared the highway to a point three kilometres north of its current junction with PTH 10 north at what is now the turnoff to the Ski Valley Recreation Area. PTH 4 would then turn west and rejoin the current configuration just east of Basswood. The current section of PTH 16 between its current northbound/westbound junction with PTH 10 and Basswood was constructed and opened to traffic in 1953.

After these reconfigurations, PTH 4 met southbound PTH 10 two kilometres south of Minnedosa and then shared the highway through the town along what is now PTH 16A to its current northbound/westbound junction. The highway was extended two kilometres farther west in 1971 to its current junction with southbound PTH 10 with the construction of the Minnedosa bypass.

The current section between Shoal Lake and the southbound junction of PTH 83 was constructed and opened to traffic in 1958. Prior to this, PTH 4 would meet PTH 21 in Shoal Lake (northbound PTH 21 ended at this point). The highway would continue west along what is now PTH 42 to meet PTH 83 south at Birtle. The two highways would then run in concurrence from Birtle to the current junction seven kilometres east of Foxwarren, where it would then rejoin its current configuration.

Prior to 1990, PTH 16 used to be cosigned with PTH 1 between its junction west of Portage La Prairie and Winnipeg; however, when the Yellowhead Highway was incorporated as part of the Trans-Canada Highway, the PTH 16 designation was dropped in favour of the current unnumbered designation.

== Major intersections ==
Division	Location	km	mi	Destinations	Notes
Russell – Binscarth		0.0	0.0	Highway 16 (TCH/YH) west – Yorkton, Saskatoon	Continuation into Saskatchewan
Russell – Binscarth		5.2	3.2	Crosses the Assiniboine River	
Russell – Binscarth	Russell	15.6	9.7	PTH 83 north – Roblin	West end of PTH 83 concurrency
Russell – Binscarth	Russell	16.6	10.3	PTH 45 east (Russell Subdivision Trail) – Rossburn	
Russell – Binscarth		19.9	12.4	PR 579 west – Millwood	
Russell – Binscarth		23.1	14.4	Road 116 N	Former PR 479 east
Russell – Binscarth	Binscarth	33.0	20.5	PR 478 – Esterhazy	
Russell – Binscarth		35.0	21.7	PTH 41 south – St. Lazare	
Ellice – Archie / Russell – Binscarth		36.5	22.7	PR 359 east	
Prairie View	Foxwarren	48.0	29.8	PR 475 west	
Prairie View		54.5	33.9	PTH 83 south – Birtle	East end of PTH 83 concurrency
Prairie View		57.8	35.9	PR 476 north – Angusville	
Prairie View		65.7	40.8	PR 472 south – Solsgirth	Former PR 474 south
Prairie View		74.4	46.2	PR 264 north – Rossburn	West end of PR 264 concurrency; former PR 254 north
Yellowhead		77.7	48.3	PR 264 south – Decker	East end of PR 264 concurrency; former PR 254 south
Yellowhead		81.1	50.4	Road 141 W – Vista	Former PR 472 north
Yellowhead	Shoal Lake	89.8	55.8	PTH 42 west – Shoal Lake, Birtle	
Yellowhead	Shoal Lake	91.3	56.7	PTH 21 – Shoal Lake, Oakburn, Hamiota	
Yellowhead		98.7	61.3	Menzie Road / Green Bluff Road (Road 131 W)	Former PR 470
Yellowhead	Strathclair	106.7	66.3	PR 354 south – Strathclair, Oak River	West end of PR 354 concurrency
Yellowhead		109.7	68.2	PR 354 north – Elphinstone	East end of PR 354 concurrency
Harrison Park	Newdale	120.4	74.8	PR 250 south – Newdale, Rivers	West end of PR 250 concurrency
Harrison Park		122.0	75.8	PR 250 north – Sandy Lake	East end of PR 250 concurrency
Harrison Park		123.3	76.6	Road 91 N	Former PR 473 east
Oakview		135.4	84.1	PR 270 to PTH 45 – Rapid City	Former PTH 27 south
Minto – Odanah	Minnedosa	147.9	91.9	PTH 10 north (John Bracken Highway) – Riding Mountain Park, Dauphin PTH 16A east – Minnedosa	West end of PTH 10 concurrency
Minto – Odanah	Minnedosa	150.5	93.5	PR 355 – Minnedosa, Cardale	
Minto – Odanah	Minnedosa	154.0	95.7	PTH 10 south (John Bracken Highway) – Brandon	East end of PTH 10 concurrency
Minto – Odanah		156.0	96.9	PTH 16A north / PR 262 – Minnedosa	
Minto – Odanah		164.4	102.2	PR 466 south	
North Cypress – Langford		166.0	103.1	Franklin Road (Road 96 W) – Franklin	Former PR 466 north
North Cypress – Langford		172.5	107.2	PR 464 south – Brookdale	
North Cypress – Langford	Neepawa	179.0	111.2	PTH 5 north (Parks Route) – Dauphin	West end of PTH 5 concurrency
North Cypress – Langford	Neepawa	180.4	112.1	PTH 5 south (Parks Route) – Carberry	East end of PTH 5 concurrency; former PR 258 south
Glenella – Lansdowne		195.6– 195.8	121.5– 121.7	PR 352 – Sidney, Arden	Intersections offset; 200 m (660 ft) PR 352 concurrency
WestLake – Gladstone		207.5	128.9	PR 260 north – Plumas	
WestLake – Gladstone	Gladstone	217.0	134.8	PTH 34 south – Gladstone, Austin	Former PR 460 north
WestLake – Gladstone		229.5	142.6	PR 350 south – Katrime	
WestLake – Gladstone		238.3	148.1	PTH 50 north – Langruth, Amaranth	
WestLake – Gladstone	Westbourne	245.7	152.7	PR 242 south – Westbourne, Lynchs Point, Bagot	Western end of PR 242 concurrency
WestLake – Gladstone		248.0	154.1	PR 242 north – Lynchs Point	Eastern end of PR 242 concurrency
Portage la Prairie		249.8	155.2	PR 227 east – Warren	
Portage la Prairie		258.3	160.5	Road 71 N – Poplar Point	Former PR 249 east
Portage la Prairie		266.5	165.6	PTH 1 (TCH) / YH – Winnipeg, Portage la Prairie, Brandon PR 305 south – St. Claude	PTH 16 eastern terminus; Yellowhead Route follows PTH 1 east
See PTH 1 (TCH)
City of Winnipeg		352.2	218.8	Perimeter Highway (PTH 100 east / PTH 101 north) / Route 85 begins – Kenora	Interchange; signed as exits 318A (east) and 318B (north); PTH 100 / PTH 101 exit 42; west end of Route 85 (Portage Avenue) concurrency
City of Winnipeg		356.9	221.8	Moray Street (Route 96 south)	
City of Winnipeg		361.2	224.4	Route 90 (Kenaston Boulevard / Century Street) – Airport	Interchange; no direct eastbound exit to Route 90 north (signed via Empress Street)
City of Winnipeg		364.2	226.3	Broadway (PTH 1 (TCH) east)	East end of PTH 1 concurrency; no eastbound entrance from Portage Avenue
City of Winnipeg		364.4– 364.5	226.4– 226.5	Maryland Street (south) / Sherbrook Street (north) (Route 70)	One-way pair
City of Winnipeg		365.2	226.9	Colony Street / Memorial Boulevard (Route 62)	
City of Winnipeg		365.6	227.2	Carlton Street (Route 57 east)	West end of Route 57 eastbound concurrency; one-way southbound (eastbound)
City of Winnipeg		365.8– 365.9	227.3– 227.4	Donald Street (south) / Smith Street (north) (Route 42)	One-way pair
City of Winnipeg		366.1	227.5	Notre Dame Avenue (Route 57 west) / Fort Street	West end of Route 57 westbound concurrency; one-way northbound (westbound)
City of Winnipeg		366.2	227.5	Main Street (Route 52) / Portage Avenue (Route 57 east) / Route 85 ends / YH ends	See Portage and Main; Mile Zero Yellowhead Highway; east end of Route 57 / Route 85 (Portage Avenue) concurrency
1.000 mi = 1.609 km; 1.000 km = 0.621 mi: Closed/former; Concurrency terminus

== Related routes ==
=== Provincial Trunk Highway 16A ===
Provincial Trunk Highway 16A
- 1st Street SW, 3rd Avenue SW, Main Street
- Location: Minnedosa
- Length: 9.1 km (5.7 mi)
- Existed: 1971–present

Provincial Trunk Highway 16A (PTH 16A) is a 9.1-kilometre-long (5.7 mi) north-south alternate route of PTH 16 in the town of Minnedosa, mostly running along PTH 16's former alignment through downtown prior to the bypass opening in 1971.

=== Provincial Road 472 ===
Provincial Road 472
- Road 150W
- Location: Solsgirth
- Length: 9.1 km (5.7 mi)
- Existed: 1992–present

Provincial Road 472 (PR 472) is a 9.1-kilometre-long (5.7 mi) north–south spur of PTH 16 in the Prairie View Municipality, providing access to the hamlet of Solsgirth. It is entirely a two-lane highway, with only the portion between the Yellowhead and Front Street S being paved while the rest is gravel. There is a railway crossing in Solsgirth.

Provincial Road 472
- Road 141W
- Location: Kelloe - Vista
- Length: 17.3 km (10.7 mi)
- Existed: 1966–1992

Prior to 1992, what is now PR 472 was part of a much longer PR 474, while the original PR 472 was slightly further east, running 17.3 kilometres (10.7 mi) from the Yellowhead near Kelloe northward along Road 141W to Vista, where it ended at an intersection with PTH 45 (Russell Subdivision Trail).

Division	Location	km	mi	Destinations	Notes
Prairie View		0.0	0.0	PTH 42 – Shoal Lake, Birtle; Road 150W – Isabella	Southern terminus; road continues south as Road 150W (former PR 474 south; southern end of unpaved section
Prairie View	Solsgirth	8.0	5.0	Front Street S – Solsgirth	Northern end of unpaved section
Prairie View	Solsgirth	8.2	5.1	Government Road Allowance – Solsgirth	
Prairie View		9.1	5.7	PTH 16 (TCH) / YH – Russell, Shoal Lake	Northern terminus; road continues north as Road 150W
1.000 mi = 1.609 km; 1.000 km = 0.621 mi

Yellowhead Highway
Previous route SK Highway 16	Provincial Trunk Highway 16	Next route Provincial Trunk Highway 1
Trans-Canada Highway
Previous route SK Highway 16	Provincial Trunk Highway 16	Next route Provincial Trunk Highway 1
