= Manitoba Provincial Road 264 =

Provincial Road in Manitoba, Canada

Provincial Road 264
- PR 264 highlighted in red

Route information
- Maintained by Department of Infrastructure
- Length: 119.2 km (74.1 mi)
- Existed: 1992–present

Major junctions
- South end: PTH 24 in Crandall
- PR 355 in Decker; PTH 42 south of Kelloe; PTH 16 (TCH) / YH in Kelloe; PTH 45 in Rossburn; PR 577 north of Rossburn
- North end: PTH 83 north of Russell

Location
- Country: Canada
- Province: Manitoba
- Rural municipalities: Prairie View, Hamiota, Yellowhead, Rossburn, Riding Mountain West, Russell-Binscarth

Highway system
- Provincial highways in Manitoba; Winnipeg City Routes
← PR 262	→ PR 265

Provincial Road 264 (PR 264) is a 119.2-kilometre-long (74.1 mi) north–south highway in the Westman and Parkland Regions of Manitoba, connecting Crandall, Decker, Kelloe, Rossburn, and Silver Beach.

== Route description ==
PR 264 begins in the Prairie View Municipality at an intersection with PTH 24 in the community of Crandall. It heads north as a paved two-lane highway to travel along the eastern side of town before transitioning to gravel and heading north to have a junction with PR 469. The highway crosses the Arrow River as it begins straddling the Hamiota Municipality border, travelling through Decker, where it has an intersection with PR 355.

PR 264 goes through a switchback as it enters the Rural Municipality of Yellowhead, continuing north through rural farmland for several kilometres to cross the Arrow River a final time before having a junction with PTH 42. The highway enters the community of Kelloe, crossing a railway before joining a concurrency (overlap) with PTH 16 (Yellowhead Highway) westbound. The pair re-enter the Prairie View Municipality before PR 264 splits off and heads north as a paved two-lane highway.

After travelling through several kilometres of rural farmland, the highway enters the Rossburn Municipality to have an intersection with PR 359 before entering the town of Rossburn, passing straight through the centre of town along Main Street. PR 264 has an intersection with PTH 45 before leaving town and continuing north to an intersection with PR 577, where the pavement ends. Continuing along gravel, it goes through a switchback at Glen Elmo before making a sharp turn to the west and begin following the southern boundary of Riding Mountain National Park.

Entering the Rural Municipality of Riding Mountain West, PR 264 travels west past Silver Beach (via Sawaryn Road) before meeting PR 476 and going through a switchback. Leaving the National Park behind, the highway has a junction with PR 478 prior to travelling west through Cracknell and coming to an end at an intersection with PTH 83 along the border with the Municipality of Russell-Binscarth.

== History ==
Provincial Road 254
- Location: Goodlands–Virden
- Length: 118.7 km (73.8 mi)
- Existed: 1966–present

Prior to 1992, when PR 264 was designated, the entire length of the highway was a part of a much longer PR 254, which had existed as far back as 1966. Also included in this former section of PR 254 was a short concurrency with PR 259 past Lenore, along with what is now Road 67N and Road 145W.

== Major intersections ==
Division	Location	km	mi	Destinations	Notes
Prairie View	Crandall	0.0	0.0	PTH 24 – Oak River, Miniota; Road 145W – Lenore	Southern terminus; road continues south as Road 145W (former PR 254)
Prairie View		4.9	3.0	PR 469 east – Hamiota	Western terminus of PR 469
Prairie View–Hamiota boundary	Decker	14.8	9.2	PR 355 – Beulah, Minnedosa	
Yellowhead		27.9	17.3	Road 93N	Former PR 477 east
Yellowhead		34.5	21.4	PTH 42 – Birtle, Shoal Lake	
Yellowhead	Kelloe	39.5	24.5	PTH 16 (TCH) east / YH – Minnedosa	Southern end of PTH 16 concurrency; southern end of paved section
Prairie View		42.8	26.6	PTH 16 (TCH) west / YH – Russell	Northern end of PTH 16 concurrency
Rossburn		58.6	36.4	PR 359 west	Eastern terminus of PR 359
Rossburn	Rossburn	65.2	40.5	PTH 45 (Russell Subdivision Trail) – Waywayseecappo, Oakburn	
Rossburn		68.5	42.6	PR 577 east – Rossman Lake	Western terminus of PR 577; northern end of paved section
Riding Mountain West		96.4	59.9	Sawaryn Road – Silver Beach	
Riding Mountain West		98.0	60.9	PR 476 south – Angusville	Northern terminus of PR 476
Riding Mountain West		109.5	68.0	PR 478 south – Silverton	Northern terminus PR 478
Riding Mountain West	Cracknell	102.8	63.9	Boulton School Road – Inglis	Former PR 478 north
Riding Mountain West–Russell-Binscarth boundary		119.2	74.1	PTH 83 – Russell, Roblin	Northern terminus; road continues west as Road 126N
1.000 mi = 1.609 km; 1.000 km = 0.621 mi: Concurrency terminus
