= Manitoba Provincial Road 577 =

Provincial road in Manitoba, Canada

Provincial Road 577

Route information
- Maintained by Department of Infrastructure
- Length: 37.7 km (23.4 mi)
- Existed: 1966–present

Major junctions
- West end: PR 264 near Rossburn
- PR 566 near Olha
- South end: PTH 45 / PTH 21 at Oakburn

Location
- Country: Canada
- Province: Manitoba
- Rural municipalities: Rossburn, Yellowhead

Highway system
- Provincial highways in Manitoba; Winnipeg City Routes
← PR 575	→ PR 579

Provincial Road 577 (PR 577) is a 37.7-kilometre-long (23.4 mi) highway in the Parkland Region of Manitoba. It connects the communities of Rossman Lake, Marco, and Olha with Rossburn and Oakburn. While mostly an unpaved gravel road, it does contain two distinct paved sections, one between its western end and Rossman Lake, and the other between its southern end and Vista Road, as well as being paved within Olha. The highway does switch cardinal directions at the intersection with PR 566.

== Route description ==
PR 577 begins in the Rossburn Municipality at an intersection with PR 264 north of the town of Rossburn. Heading east through farmland as a paved two-lane highway, it goes through a switchback before travelling along the south side of both Rossman Lake and the Sioux Valley Dakota Nation's Fishing Station 62A Reserve, where the pavement transitions to gravel. The highway travels through Marco, passing by the Marco Hall Monument and the Marconi School Historic Site before making a sharp turn to the south near the boundary of Riding Mountain National Park. After crossing Heron Creek twice, PR 577 has an intersection with PR 566, where the highway switches cardinal directions, before passing through the Olha community as it traverses a switchback. Heading south, the highway passes by both the Olha Lakes and Patterson Lake before passing just to the east of the Ukrainian Pioneer Mass Grave Historic Site. It has an intersection with Vista Road (former PR 359), where it becomes paved once again and enters the Rural Municipality of Yellowhead, ending at a junction between PTH 45 (Russell Subdivision Trail) and PTH 21 on the northern edge of Oakburn.

== History ==
Prior to 1992, all of PR 577 south of the junction with PR 566 was part of that highway, while PR 577 followed what is now PR 566 to an intersection with the former PR 359 (Horod Road).

== Major intersections ==
Division	Location	km	mi	Destinations	Notes
Rossburn		0.0	0.0	PR 264 – Rossburn, Deep Lake	Western terminus; former PR 254; western end of paved section
Rossburn	Rossman Lake	9.4	5.8	Lake View Drive – Rossman Lake, Sioux Valley Dakota Nation (Fishing Station 62A)	
Rossburn	Rossman Lake	10.2	6.3	Road 138.5W – Rossman Lake	Eastern end of paved section
Rossburn	Marco	15.9	9.9	Marco Hall Monument	
Rossburn	Marco	17.6	10.9	Road 134W – Marconi School Historic Site	
Rossburn		24.0	14.9	PR 566 south – Menzie	Northern terminus of PR 566; former PR 577 east; PR 577 switches cardinal directions from east-west to north-south
Rossburn	Olha	25.6	15.9	Road 113N – Swystun Pioneer Settlement Park	
Rossburn		30.0	18.6	Road 111N – Ukrainian Pioneer Mass Grave Historic Site	
Rossburn		31.6	19.6	Vista Road – Rogers, Vista	Former PR 359; northern end of paved section
Yellowhead	Oakburn	37.7	23.4	PTH 45 (Russell Subdivision Trail) – Elphinstone, Rossburn; PTH 21 south – Shoal Lake	Southern terminus; southern end of paved section
1.000 mi = 1.609 km; 1.000 km = 0.621 mi
