= Manitoba Provincial Road 250 =

Provincial road in Manitoba, Canada

Provincial Road 250
- PR 250 highlighted in red

Route information
- Maintained by Department of Infrastructure
- Length: 140 km (87 mi)
- Existed: 1966–present

Major junctions
- North end: PR 354 near Riding Mountain National Park
- PTH 45 at Sandy Lake; PTH 16 (TCH) / YH at Newdale; PTH 24 near Rivers; PTH 25 at Rivers; PTH 1 (TCH) at Alexander
- South end: PTH 2 / PTH 22 at Souris

Location
- Country: Canada
- Province: Manitoba
- Rural municipalities: Harrison Park; Oakview; Riverdale; Whitehead; Souris – Glenwood

Highway system
- Provincial highways in Manitoba; Winnipeg City Routes
← PR 248	→ PR 251

Provincial Road 250 (PR 250) is a provincial road in the Canadian province of Manitoba. It a north-south route that provides access to the towns of Souris and Rivers from the Trans-Canada Highway (PTH 1).

== Route description ==
PR 250 begins at the intersection of PTH 2 and 22 in Souris, and runs due north to the Trans-Canada Highway. The two run concurrently west to Alexander, after which PR 250 continues north again, through the town of Rivers to the Yellowhead Highway at Newdale. It continues north to PTH 45 at Sandy Lake, after which it becomes a gravel road until it reaches its northern terminus at PR 354 near the southern boundary of Riding Mountain National Park. Aside from the Trans-Canada Highway, PR 250 also has short concurrences with PTH 25, PR 355, and PTH 16.

Between Souris and the Trans-Canada Highway, PR 250 is classified as an RTAC route, which permits full truck and trailer access.

== Major intersections ==
Division	Location	km	mi	Destinations	Notes
Souris – Glenwood	Souris	0	0.0	PTH 2 (1st Avenue / Red Coat Trail) – Pipestone, Holland; PTH 22 south (1st Street S.) – Elgin	Southern terminus. Continues as PTH 22.
Whitehead		13	8.1	PR 349 east – Brandon	
Whitehead		25	16	PTH 1 (TCH) east – Brandon, Winnipeg	Eastern end of PTH 1 overlap.
Whitehead	Alexander	29	18	PTH 1 (TCH) west – Virden, Regina	Western end of PTH 1 overlap
Whitehead		30	19	PR 455 west	
Riverdale		52	32	PR 259 west – Wheatland	
Riverdale		54	34	PTH 25 west	Western end of PTH 25 overlap.
Riverdale	Rivers	58	36	PTH 25 east – Brandon	Eastern end of PTH 25 overlap.
Oakview		70	43	PTH 24 – Oak River, Rapid City	
Oakview		82	51	PR 355 west – Cardale	Western end of PR 355 overlap.
Oakview		84	52	PR 355 east – Minnedosa	Eastern end of PR 355 overlap.
Harrison Park	Newdale	97	60	PTH 16 (TCH) west / YH – Strathclair	Western end of TCH 16 overlap.
Harrison Park		99	62	PTH 16 (TCH) east / YH – Minnedosa	Eastern end of TCH 16 overlap.
Harrison Park	Sandy Lake	119	74	PTH 45 (Russell Subdivision Trail) – Oakburn, Erickson	
Harrison Park		131	81	PR 470 west – Stuart Lake	
Harrison Park		140	87	PR 354 – Lake Audy, Onanole	Northern terminus.
1.000 mi = 1.609 km; 1.000 km = 0.621 mi: Concurrency terminus
