= Manitoba Provincial Road 470 =

Provincial road in Manitoba, Canada

Provincial Road 470

Route information
- Maintained by Department of Infrastructure
- Length: 25.1 km (15.6 mi)
- Existed: 1966–present

Major junctions
- West end: PR 566 near Menzie
- PR 354 near Horod
- East end: PR 250 near Crawford Park

Location
- Country: Canada
- Province: Manitoba
- Rural municipalities: Yellowhead, Harrison Park

Highway system
- Provincial highways in Manitoba; Winnipeg City Routes
← PR 469	→ PR 471

Provincial Road 470 (PR 470) is a 25.1-kilometre-long (15.6 mi) east–west highway in the Westman Region of Manitoba near the southern boundary of Riding Mountain National Park. It connects Horod with Stuart Lake and Menzie.

== Route description ==
PR 470 begins just north of the hamlet of Menzie and just south of the locality of Rogers at a junction with PR 566. It meanders its way east along the border between the Rural Municipality of Yellowhead and the Municipality of Harrison Park, travelling past numerous lakes and small farms while passing through the locality of Wisla and by the St. John Church Dolyny Provincial Historic Site. Fully crossing into the Municipality of Harrison Park via a short concurrency with northbound PR 354 just south of Horod, the highway crosses a bridge over the Little Saskatchewan River and winds its way northeast to travel along the southern coastline of Stuart Lake. PR 470 comes to an end a few kilometres later at an intersection with PR 250. PR 470 is a rural, gravel, two-lane highway for its entire length.

== History ==
Prior to 1992, PR 470 was a much longer highway and was signed as north south instead of its current east–west designation. It originally began at a junction with what was then PR 469 just east of the town of Hamiota, heading north to the hamlet of McConnell to have an intersection with what was then PR 355 (now Road 133W and Road 86N), heading east along Road 86N for a short distance before heading due north along Road 131W. The highway crossed the Yellowhead Highway (PTH 16) at Ipswich, where it also travelled past the Ipswich Elevator Provincial Historic Site, before continuing on to the hamlet of Menzie, where it shared a short concurrency with PTH 45 (Russell Subdivision Trail / Main Street). Finally, PR 470 followed what is now PR 566 (1st Avenue) northbound to meet its current alignment just south of Rogers. PR 470's original length was 74.8 kilometres (46.5 mi).

== Major intersections ==
Division	Location	km	mi	Destinations	Notes
Yellowhead–Harrison Park boundary		0.0	0.0	PR 566 – Menzie, Olha	Western terminus; former PR 470 south; road continues west as Road 108N
Yellowhead–Harrison Park boundary		3.3	2.1	Road 128W – St. John Church Dolyny Historic Site	
Yellowhead–Harrison Park boundary		13.5	8.4	PR 354 south – Elphinstone	Western end of PR 354 concurrency
Harrison Park		15.2	9.4	PR 354 north – Horod	Eastern end of PR 354 concurrency
Harrison Park		15.3	9.5	Bridge over the Little Saskatchewan River	
Harrison Park		25.1	15.6	PR 250 – Crawford Park, Sandy Lake	Eastern terminus; road continues east as Road 110N
1.000 mi = 1.609 km; 1.000 km = 0.621 mi: Concurrency terminus
