= Manitoba Provincial Road 270 =

Provincial road in Manitoba, Canada

Provincial Road 270
- PR 270 highlighted in red

Route information
- Maintained by Department of Infrastructure
- Length: 86.3 km (53.6 mi)
- Existed: 1966–present

Major junctions
- South end: PTH 1 (TCH) near Brandon
- PTH 25 east of Rivers; PTH 16 (TCH) / YH at Basswood; PTH 45 near Rackham
- North end: PR 354 west of Onanole

Location
- Country: Canada
- Province: Manitoba
- Rural municipalities: Cornwallis, Elton, Oakview, Harrison Park

Highway system
- Provincial highways in Manitoba; Winnipeg City Routes
← PR 269	→ PR 271

Provincial Road 270 (PR 270) is a north–south provincial road in the Canadian province of Manitoba. Located in the Westman Region, the roadway is 86.3 kilometres (53.6 mi) long.

== Route description ==
The roadway begins at a junction with the four-lane Trans-Canada Highway (Provincial Trunk Highway 1, PTH 1) just northwest of Brandon. Its only paved section outside of any concurrencies is the section between PTH 1 and PTH 25 east of Rivers. PR 270 is unpaved for the remainder of its northerly course except for its brief PTH 24 concurrency in Rapid City. It crosses PTH 16, the Yellowhead Highway at Basswood. PR 270's northern terminus is at PR 354 west of Onanole.

== Major intersections ==
Division	Location	km	mi	Destinations	Notes
Cornwallis / Elton boundary		0.0	0.0	PTH 1 (TCH) – Brandon, Regina	Southern terminus; southern end of paved section; road continues south as Marsden Road
Elton		14.8	9.2	PTH 25 – Rivers	Northern end of paved section
Oakview	Rapid City	26.3	16.3	6th Avenue	Southern end of paved section
Oakview	Rapid City	26.8	16.7	PTH 24 east (2nd Avenue)	Southern end of PTH 24 concurrency
Oakview	Rapid City	26.9	16.7	Bridge over the Little Saskatchewan River	
Oakview		28.4	17.6	PTH 24 west – Miniota	Northern end of PTH 24 concurrency; northern end of paved section
Oakview		35.8	22.2	Riverdale Road (Road 81N)	Former PR 563 east
Oakview	Cadurcis	40.7	25.3	PR 355 – Cardale, Minnedosa	
Oakview	Basswood	47.4	29.5	Railway Avenue – Basswood	
Oakview	Basswood	47.7	29.6	PTH 16 (TCH) / YH – Russell, Minnedosa	
Harrison Park		52.4	32.6	Newdale Road (Road 91N)	Former PR 473
Harrison Park		57.8	35.9	Bridge over the Little Saskatchewan River	
Harrison Park	Rolling River First Nation	66.2	41.1	Road 99N – Rolling River 67	
Harrison Park	Rolling River First Nation	69.4	43.1	Road 101N – Rolling River 67	
Harrison Park	Rolling River First Nation	72.7	45.2	PTH 45 (Russell Subdivision Trail) to PTH 10 (John Bracken Highway) – Oakburn	
Harrison Park		86.3	53.6	PR 354 – Onanole, Lake Audy	Northern terminus; former PR 359 west
1.000 mi = 1.609 km; 1.000 km = 0.621 mi: Concurrency terminus
