= Manitoba Provincial Road 359 =

Provincial Road in Manitoba, Canada

Provincial Road 359
- PR 359 highlighted in red

Route information
- Maintained by Department of Infrastructure
- Length: 35.9 km (22.3 mi)
- Existed: 1966–present

Major junctions
- West end: PTH 16 (TCH) / PTH 83 / PTH 41 / YH near Binscarth
- PR 476 near Angusville
- East end: PR 264 near Rossburn

Location
- Country: Canada
- Province: Manitoba
- Rural municipalities: Russell-Binscarth, Ellice-Archie, Prairie View, Riding Mountain West, Rossburn

Highway system
- Provincial highways in Manitoba; Winnipeg City Routes
← PR 357	→ PR 360

Provincial Road 359 (PR 359) is a 35.9-kilometre-long (22.3 mi) east–west gravel road in the Parkland Region of Manitoba, connecting Binscarth with Rossburn.

== Route description ==
PR 359 begins in the Municipality of Russell-Binscarth at an intersection between PTH 16/PTH 83 (Yellowhead Highway) and PTH 41 just south of the town of Binscarth. It immediately goes through a switchback, briefly entering the Rural Municipality of Ellice-Archie before heading due east through rural farmland along the boundary between the Prairie View Municipality and the Rural Municipality of Riding Mountain West for the next several kilometres. The highway joins a short concurrency with PR 476 northbound, where it fully enters the Rural Municipality of Riding Mountain West, before splitting off and heading east along the southern boundary of the Waywayseecappo First Nation. Entering the Rossburn Municipality, PR 359 crosses the Birdtail River and its river valley before coming to an end at an intersection with PR 264 just south of the town of Rossburn. The entire length of PR 359 is a gravel, rural, two-lane highway.

== History ==
Prior to 1992, PR 359 extended east a further 65.5 kilometres (40.7 mi) through Vista and Horod before following what is now PR 354 along the southern boundary of Riding Mountain National Park past Lake Audy and Crawford Park to a junction with PR 270 just outside of Onanole.

== Major intersections ==
Division	Location	km	mi	Destinations	Notes
Russell-Binscarth		0.0	0.0	PTH 16 (TCH) / PTH 83 / YH – Russell, Foxwarren; PTH 41 south – St. Lazare	Western terminus; northern terminus of PTH 41; road continues east as PTH 41 southbound
Ellice-Archie	No major junctions				
Prairie View–Riding Mountain West boundary		17.7	11.0	PR 476 south	Western end of PR 476 concurrency
Riding Mountain West		21.1	13.1	PR 476 north – Angusville	Eastern end of PR 476 concurrency
Rossburn	Waywayseecappo First Nation	30.4	18.9	Bridge over the Birdtail River	
Rossburn		35.9	22.3	PR 264 – Rossburn, Kelloe	Eastern terminus; road continues east as Road 110N
1.000 mi = 1.609 km; 1.000 km = 0.621 mi: Concurrency terminus
