= Manitoba Provincial Road 476 =

Provincial road in Manitoba, Canada

Provincial Road 476

Route information
- Maintained by Department of Infrastructure
- Length: 36.2 km (22.5 mi)
- Existed: 1966–present

Major junctions
- South end: PTH 16 (TCH) / YH near Solsgirth
- PTH 45 in Angusville
- North end: PR 264 near Silver Beach

Location
- Country: Canada
- Province: Manitoba
- Rural municipalities: Prairie View, Riding Mountain West

Highway system
- Provincial highways in Manitoba; Winnipeg City Routes
← PR 475	→ PR 478

Provincial Road 476 (PR 476) is a 36.2-kilometre-long (22.5 mi) north–south highway in the Westman and Parkland regions of Manitoba. It connects the hamlets of Angusville and Silver Beach with the Yellowhead Highway.

== Route description ==
PR 476 begins in the Prairie View Municipality at an intersection with the Yellowhead Highway (PTH 16) between Foxwarren and Solsgirth, heading north along Road 154W as a two-lane gravel road through rural farmland for several kilometres before traversing a short switchback, where it shares a short concurrency with PR 359 as it enters the Rural Municipality of Riding Mountain West. Continuing north along Road 153W, the highway skirts along the western edge of the Waywayseecappo First Nation to cross PTH 45 (Russell Subdivision Trail), becoming paved as it enters Angusville along Main Street. It heads straight through the centre of town, crossing the Trans Canada Trail before returning to gravel at an intersection with North Avenue. Leaving Angusville, PR 476 heads north through rural farmland for a few more kilometres before coming to an end near the Riding Mountain National Park southern boundary at an intersection with PR 264 just west of Silver Beach.

== Major intersections ==
Division	Location	km	mi	Destinations	Notes
Prairie View		0.0	0.0	PTH 16 (TCH) / YH – Shoal Lake, Russell	Southern terminus; road continues south as Road 154W
Prairie View–Riding Mountain West boundary		8.2	5.1	PR 359 west – Binscarth	Southern end of PR 359 concurrency
Riding Mountain West		11.6	7.2	PR 359 east	Northern end of PR 359 concurrency
Riding Mountain West		22.4	13.9	Road 153W	Former PR 479 west
Riding Mountain West	Angusville	23.1	14.4	PTH 45 (Russell Subdivision Trail) – Russell, Rossburn	Southern end of paved section
Riding Mountain West	Angusville	24.1	15.0	North Avenue	Northern end of paved section
Riding Mountain West		36.2	22.5	PR 264 to PTH 83 – Cracknell, Silver Beach, Rossburn	Northern terminus; former PR 254; road continues north as Road 153W
1.000 mi = 1.609 km; 1.000 km = 0.621 mi: Concurrency terminus
