= Manitoba Highway 42 =

Highway in Manitoba

Provincial Trunk Highway 42
- PTH 42 highlighted in red

Route information
- Maintained by Department of Infrastructure
- Length: 56 km (35 mi)
- Existed: 1968–present

Major junctions
- West end: PTH 41 near St. Lazare
- PTH 83 at Birtle
- East end: PTH 16 (TCH) / YH at Shoal Lake

Location
- Country: Canada
- Province: Manitoba
- Rural municipalities: Ellice – Archie; Prairie View; Yellowhead

Highway system
- Provincial highways in Manitoba; Winnipeg City Routes
← PTH 41	→ PTH 44

Provincial Trunk Highway 42 (PTH 42) is a short provincial highway in the southwest region of the Canadian province of Manitoba. It runs from PTH 16 in the town of Shoal Lake to PTH 41 just east of the French-speaking village of St. Lazare.

PTH 42 provides a direct east–west connection through Birtle from PTH 16. As a result, the stretch between Birtle and Shoal Lake is heavily used by trucks as a direct access. The speed limit is 100 km/h (62 mph) east of Birtle and 90 km/h (56 mph) between PTH 83 and St. Lazare.

== Route description ==
PTH 42 begins in the Rural Municipality of Ellice - Archie at a T-intersection with PTH 41 just east of the town of St. Lazare. It heads south for roughly 1 kilometre (0.62 mi) before curving due eastward near the edge of the Assiniboine River valley. The highway crosses PR 568 immediately before entering the Rural Municipality of Prairie View, traveling eastward through rural farmland for the next several kilometers to become concurrent (overlapped) with PTH 83 and enter the town of Birtle. The two head south for a short distance before curving onto Main Street, heading east to cross the Birdtail River into downtown. The head's straight through the center of downtown, with PTH 83 splitting off and heading south in some neighborhoods on the eastern side of town. PTH 42 leaves Birtle and heads east through rural areas for the next several kilometers, junctioning with PR 472 and crossing some wetlands before entering the Rural Municipality of Yellowhead. The highway goes through switchback, immediately having an intersection with PR 264 south of Kelloe, to enter the town of Shoal Lake. It curves northward as it travels past some golf courses along the coast of Shoal Lake to have an intersection with The Drive, which provides access to downtown and PTH 21. PTH 42 travels through a neighborhood, crosses a railroad, and past a few businesses before coming to an end the intersection with PTH 16 (Yellowhead Highway).

The entire length of Manitoba Highway 42 is a rural, paved, two-lane highway.

== History ==
The highway first appeared on the 1956 Manitoba Highway Map as PTH 41A. Originally, the route served as a short connector spur of 16 kilometres (9.9 mi) between PTH 41 and PTH 4/83 near Birtle.

The section of the route between Shoal Lake and Birtle was originally part of PTH 16, which was then known as Highway 4. When the current section of PTH 16 was opened to traffic in 1958, the highway was extended to Shoal Lake.

The highway was redesignated as PTH 42 in 1968.

== Major intersections ==
Division	Location	km	mi	Destinations	Notes
Ellice - Archie		0.0	0.0	PTH 41 – St. Lazare, Russell	Western terminus
Ellice - Archie		4.8	3.0	PR 568 east	Western terminus of PR 568
Prairie View		16.2	10.1	PTH 83 north – Russell	Western end of PTH 83 concurrency
Prairie View	Birtle	18.9	11.7	PTH 83 south – Miniota	Eastern end of PTH 83 concurrency
Prairie View		27.1	16.8	PR 472 north – Solsgirth	Southern terminus of PR 472
Yellowhead		39.3	24.4	PR 264 – Rossburn, Decker	
Yellowhead	Shoal Lake	51.0	31.7	The Drive to PTH 21 – downtown	
Yellowhead	Shoal Lake	56	35	PTH 16 (TCH) / YH – Russell, Minnedosa; Road 137N	Eastern terminus; road continues as Road 137N
1.000 mi = 1.609 km; 1.000 km = 0.621 mi: Concurrency terminus
