= Manitoba Highway 25 =

Highway in Manitoba

Provincial Trunk Highway 25
- PTH 25 highlighted in red

Route information
- Maintained by Department of Infrastructure
- Length: 29 km (18 mi)
- Existed: 1953–present

Major junctions
- West end: PR 259 in Wheatland
- East end: PTH 10 near Forrest

Location
- Country: Canada
- Province: Manitoba
- Rural municipalities: Elton; Riverdale

Highway system
- Provincial highways in Manitoba; Winnipeg City Routes
← PTH 24	→ PTH 26

Provincial Trunk Highway 25 (PTH 25) is a provincial highway in the Canadian province of Manitoba. It is a short east–west route starting at PR 259 at Wheatland, east through Rivers, and terminating at PTH 10 six kilometres (3.7 mi) north of Forrest. PTH 25 serves as the major route, via PTH 10, between Rivers and Brandon.

The speed limit on this highway is 100 kilometres per hour (62 mph).

== Route description ==
PTH 25 begins in the Rural Municipality of Riverdale at a junction with PR 259 in Wheatland, directly north of the former CFB Rivers. It heads north for roughly 1 kilometre (0.62 mi) before curving eastward, becoming concurrent (overlapped) with PR 250 and crossing a rail line into the town of Rivers. The highway curves southeast, following First Avenue as it travels through neighborhoods and along the southern edge of downtown, where PR 250 splits off and heads north along Brunswick Street. PTH 25 leaves Rivers and passes by Rivers Provincial Park as it crosses the Little Saskatchewan River just east of the dam impounding Lake Wahtopanah. The highway travels along the southern edge of Chimo Resort before continuing due east through farmland for several kilometers. It crosses into the Rural Municipality of Elton and has an intersection with PR 270, continuing east through rural farmland for a few more kilometers before coming to an end at a junction with PTH 10 (John Bracken Highway) just north of Forrest. The road continues east on gravel as Road 69N.

The entire length of Manitoba Highway 25, is a rural, paved, two-lane highway.

== History ==
PTH 25 was designated originally in 1928 from PTH 2 east of Carroll to Brandon. In 1929, it extended south to Boissevain, replacing PTH 20. In 1937, it extended south to the North Dakota border. In 1938, this route became part of PTH 10.

PTH 25 was designated in 1953 along its current route.

== Major intersections ==
Division	Location	km	mi	Destinations	Notes
Riverdale		0	0.0	PR 259 – Wheatland, Bradwardine	Western terminus
Riverdale		3	1.9	PR 250 south – Alexander	Western end of PR 250 overlap.
Riverdale	Rivers	7	4.3	PR 250 north (Brunswick Street) – Newdale	Eastern end of PR 250 overlap
Elton		20	12	PR 270 to PTH 1 (TCH) – Rapid City	
Elton		29	18	PTH 10 (John Bracken Highway) – Minnedosa, Brandon	Eastern terminus
1.000 mi = 1.609 km; 1.000 km = 0.621 mi: Concurrency terminus
