= Rural Municipality of Strathclair =

Rural municipality in Manitoba, Canada

Coordinates: 50°27′42″N 100°22′09″W

The Rural Municipality of Strathclair is a former rural municipality (RM) in the Canadian province of Manitoba. It was originally incorporated as a rural municipality on December 22, 1883. It ceased on January 1, 2015, as a result of its provincially mandated amalgamation with the RM of Shoal Lake to form the Rural Municipality of Yellowhead.

The former RM is named for the community of Strathclair located within its boundaries. The main reserve of the Keeseekoowenin Ojibway First Nation is located within the northeast quadrant of the former RM.

== Communities ==
- Elphinstone
- Glenforsa
- Glossop
- Ipswich
- Menzie
- Strathclair
