= Municipality of Shoal Lake =

Rural municipality in Manitoba, Canada

Coordinates: 50°27′42″N 100°38′45″W

The Municipality of Shoal Lake is a former rural municipality (RM) in the Canadian province of Manitoba. It was originally incorporated as a rural municipality on January 1, 2011. It ceased on January 1, 2015, as a result of its provincially mandated amalgamation with the RM of Strathclair to form the Rural Municipality of Yellowhead.

The former Municipality of Shoal Lake is located in the Westman Region of the province. Its formation on January 1, 2011, was a result of an amalgamation of the former Town of Shoal Lake and the former Rural Municipality of Shoal Lake. It had a population of 555 according to the Canada 2006 Census.

== Communities ==
- Kelloe
- Oakburn
- Shoal Lake
