= Manitoba Provincial Road 259 =

Provincial road in Manitoba, Canada

Provincial Road 259
- PR 259 highlighted in red

Route information
- Maintained by Department of Infrastructure
- Length: 64.2 km (39.9 mi)
- Existed: 1966–present

Major junctions
- West end: PTH 1 / PTH 83 near Virden
- PTH 21 in Kenton; PTH 25 in Wheatland
- East end: PR 250 near Wheatland

Location
- Country: Canada
- Province: Manitoba
- Rural municipalities: Wallace-Woodworth, Riverdale

Highway system
- Provincial highways in Manitoba; Winnipeg City Routes
← PR 257	→ PR 260

Provincial Road 259 (PR 259) is a secondary highway in the Canadian province of Manitoba. The route, located in the Westman Region, is 64.2 kilometres (39.9 mi) long.

== Route description ==
PR 259 begins near Virden, at a crossroads junction with the Trans-Canada Highway (Provincial Trunk Highway 1, PTH 1), where it continues southward as PTH 83. At its junction with PR 254, PR 259 turns northward, and then curves east to PTH 21 at Kenton. It reaches its eastern terminus at PR 250 near Wheatland shortly after its PTH 25 junction.

== Major intersections ==
Division	Location	km	mi	Destinations	Notes
Town of Virden		0.0	0.0	PTH 1 / PTH 83 – Regina, Brandon	Western terminus
Wallace-Woodworth		8.1– 8.2	5.0– 5.1	Bridge over the Assiniboine River	
Wallace-Woodworth		14.9– 15.4	9.3– 9.6	PR 254 south – Griswold	Northern terminus of PR 254
Wallace-Woodworth		23.0	14.3	Railway Avenue – Lenore	
Wallace-Woodworth		26.7	16.6	Road 67N	Former PR 254 north
Wallace-Woodworth	Kenton	38.1	23.7	PTH 21 – Shoal Lake, Griswold	
Riverdale	Bradwardine	48.0	29.8	PR 564 south – Griswold	Northern terminus of PR 564; former PR 354 south
Riverdale	Bradwardine	48.8	30.3	James Street – Bradwardine	
Riverdale	Bradwardine	49.0	30.4	Elliot Street – Bradwardine	
Riverdale		52.7	32.7	Road 130W to PR 354 – Oak River	Former PR 354 north
Riverdale	Wheatland	62.6	38.9	PTH 25 east – Rivers	Western terminus of PTH 25
Riverdale		64.2	39.9	PR 250 – Alexander, Rivers	Eastern terminus
1.000 mi = 1.609 km; 1.000 km = 0.621 mi
