= Rural Municipality of Rossburn =

Rural municipality in Manitoba, Canada

Coordinates: 50°43′38″N 100°44′27″W

The Rural Municipality of Rossburn is a former rural municipality (RM) in the Canadian province of Manitoba. Name bestowed in 1879 to mark the career of R.R. Ross, a settler who arrived in that year from Molesworth, Ontario. It was originally incorporated as a rural municipality on December 22, 1883. It ceased on January 1, 2015 as a result of its provincially mandated amalgamation with the Town of Rossburn to form the Rossburn Municipality.

The former RM is located in the Parkland Region of the province and borders the Waywayseecappo First Nation. It had a population of 514 in the 2006 census.

== Communities ==
- Birdtail
- Olha
- Vista
