= Manitoba Provincial Road 473 =

Former provincial road in Manitoba, Canada

Provincial Road 473

Route information
- Maintained by Rural Municipality of Minto – Odanah and the Rural Municipality of Harrison Park
- Length: 19.2 km (11.9 mi)
- Existed: 1966–(c) 1992

Major junctions
- West end: PTH 16 (TCH) near Newdale
- PR 270
- East end: PTH 10

Location
- Country: Canada
- Province: Manitoba

Highway system
- Provincial highways in Manitoba; Winnipeg City Routes
← PR 472	→ PR 474

Provincial Road 473 (PR 473) is a former provincial road in the Canadian province of Manitoba.

== Route description ==
The route began at PTH 16 east of Newdale, and intersected PR 270 about halfway between its western and eastern termini. From there, PR 473 continued east and terminated at PTH 10 just south of Minnedosa Valley. The route was gravel for its entire length.

== History ==
In the early 1990s, the Manitoba government decommissioned a number of provincial secondary roads and returned the maintenance of these roads back to the rural municipalities. PR 473 was one of the roads that was decommissioned entirely. The route is now maintained by the Rural Municipalities of Harrison Park and Clanwilliam.

After PR 473 was decommissioned, the route became known as Mile 91N.
