= Rossburn Municipality =

Rural municipality in Manitoba, Canada

Rossburn
- Rural municipality
- Rossburn Municipality
- Location of the Rossburn Municipality in Manitoba
- Coordinates: 50°43′38″N 100°44′27″W
- Country: Canada
- Province: Manitoba
- Region: Parkland
- Incorporated (amalgamated): January 1, 2015

Government
  - Mayor: Shirley Kalyniuk

Area
  - Land: 682.79 km^{2} (263.63 sq mi)

Population (2016)
  - Total: 976
  - Density: 1.43/km^{2} (3.70/sq mi)
- Time zone: UTC-6 (CST)
  - Summer (DST): UTC-5 (CDT)
- Postal code: R0J 1V0
- Website: rossburn.ca

Rossburn Municipality is a rural municipality (RM) in the Parkland Region of Manitoba, Canada.

It was named for Reverend Richard R. Ross, an early settler to the region.

== History ==
The municipality was incorporated on January 1, 2015, via the amalgamation of the former Rural Municipality of Rossburn and the town of Rossburn. It was formed as a requirement of The Municipal Amalgamations Act, which required that municipalities with a population less than 1,000 amalgamate with one or more neighbouring municipalities by 2015. The Government of Manitoba initiated these amalgamations in order for existing municipalities to meet the 1997 minimum population requirement of 1,000 to incorporate a municipality.

== Communities ==
- Birdtail
- Olha
- Rossburn
- Vista

== Demographics ==
In the 2021 Census of Population conducted by Statistics Canada, Rossburn had a population of 973 living in 453 of its 619 total private dwellings, a change of −3% from its 2016 population of 976. With a land area of 672.29 km^{2} (259.57 sq mi), it had a population density of 1.4/km^{2} (3.7/sq mi) in 2021.
