= Sandy Lake, Manitoba =

Coordinates: 50°31′38″N 100°10′42″W

Sandy Lake
- Unincorporated community
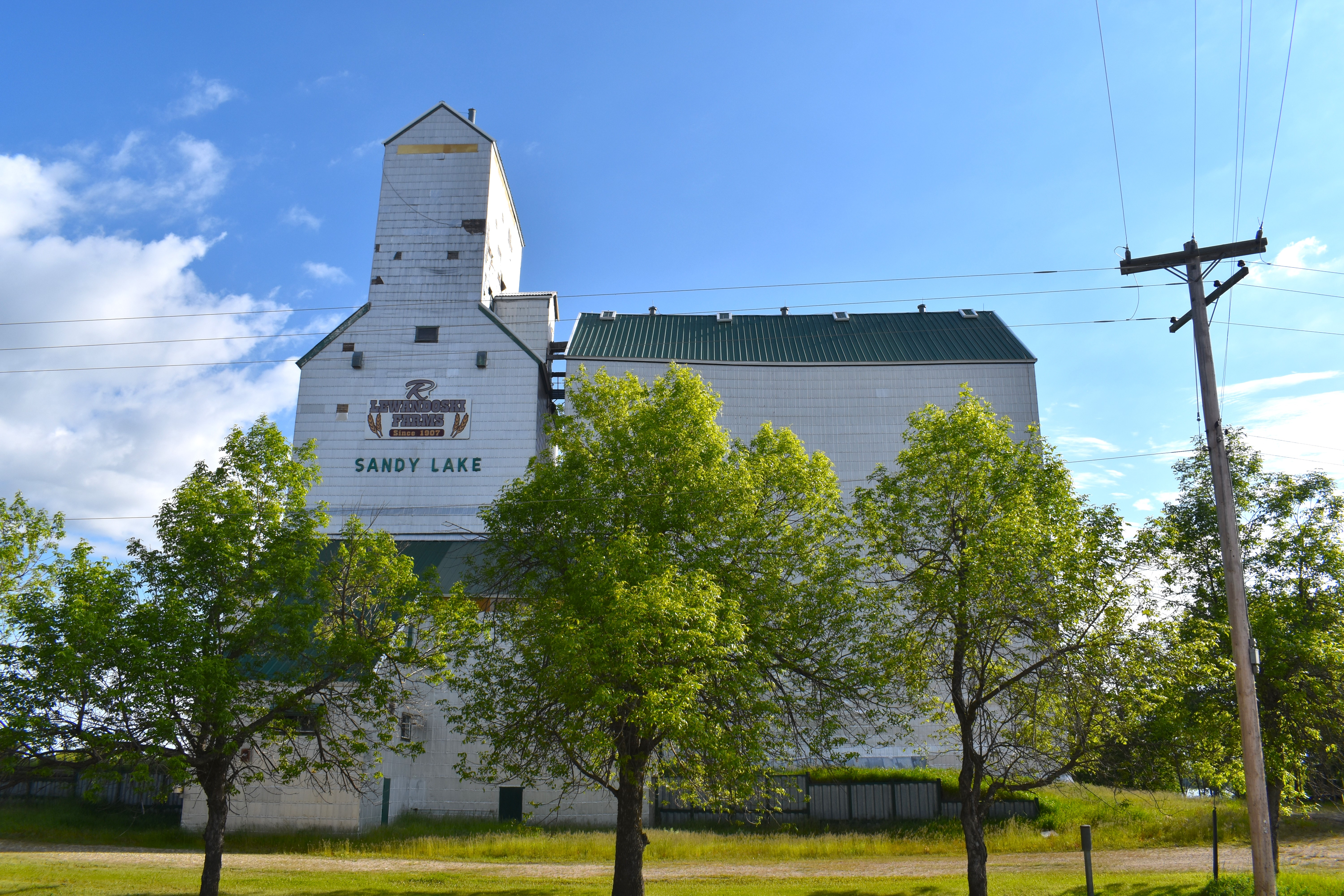
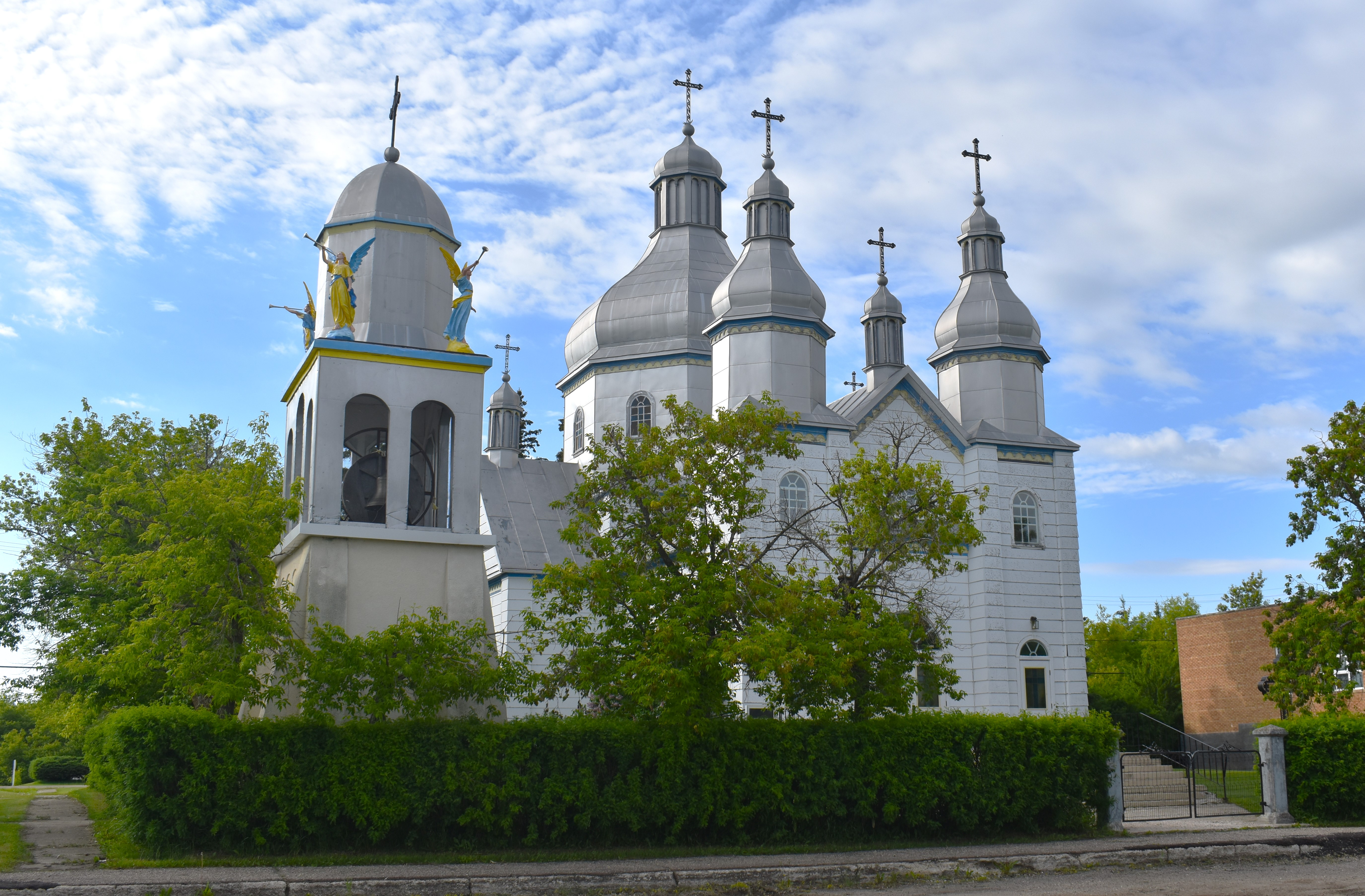
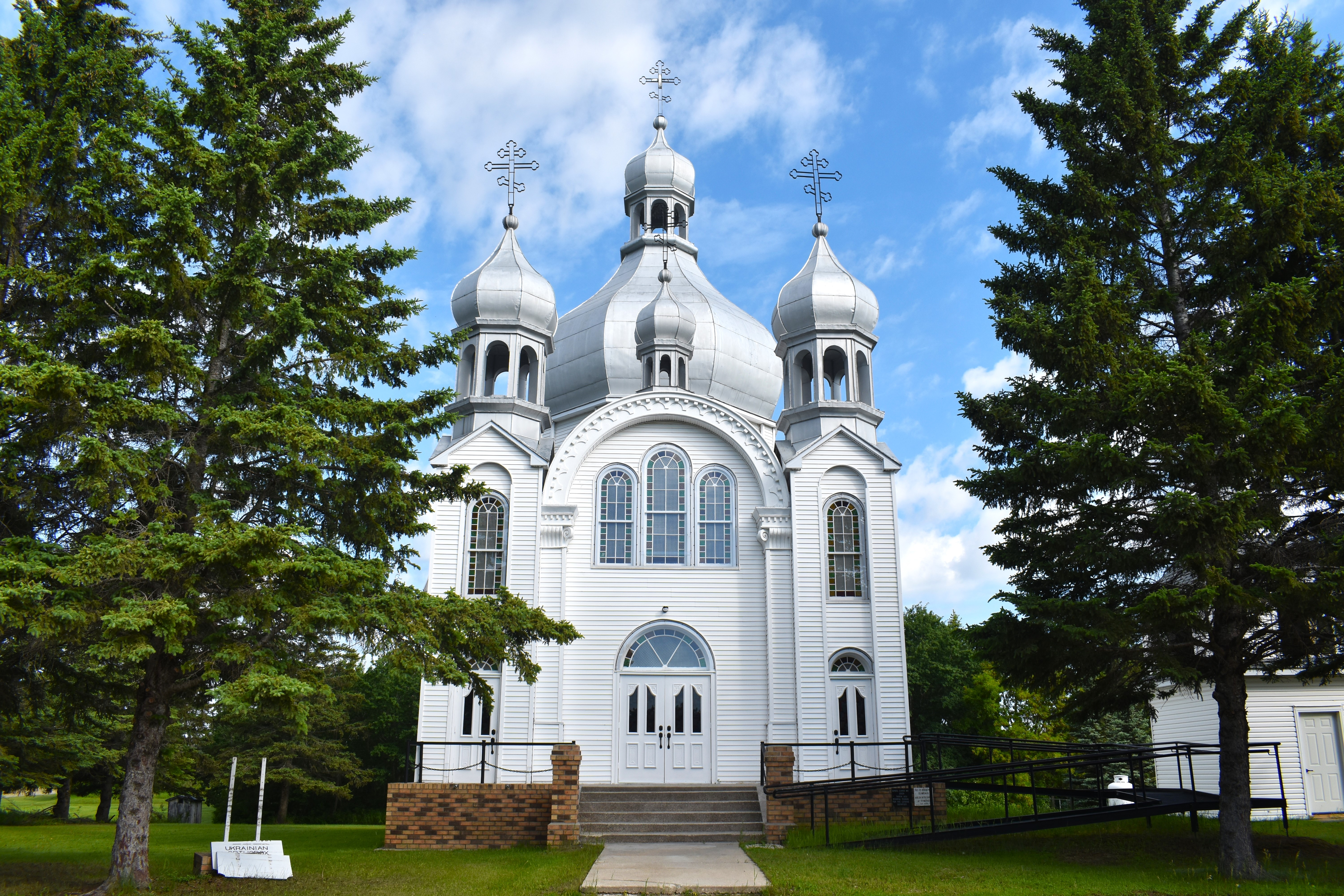
- Lewandoski Farms grain elevator in Sandy Lake. Holy Ghost Ukrainian Catholic Church in Sandy Lake. Ukrainian Orthodox Church of St. Michael in Sandy Lake.

- Location within Manitoba Sandy Lake (Canada)
- Country: Canada
- Province: Manitoba
- Rural Municipality: Harrison Park

Area
  - Total: 2.01 km^{2} (0.78 sq mi)

Population (2021)
  - Total: 301
  - Density: 150/km^{2} (388/sq mi)
- Waterways: Sandy Lake

Sandy Lake is a small farming community in the Canadian province of Manitoba. It is located in the Rural Municipality of Harrison Park along PTH 45 approximately 10 miles (16 km) west of PTH 10. It is on the southern shore of the lake with the same name.

== History ==
The Sandy Lake area has a long association with human activity, first visited by Indigenous peoples in the years predating settlers, an arrowhead was found at the lake dating back an apparent 5,000 years and can now be found at a museum in Neepawa. As early as 1832, the Hudson's Bay Company operated a settlement near present day Rolling River First Nation. Additional settlement continued in the following decades around the Riding Mountain National Park area due to the teeming populations of fur bearing animals and was also a popular area for buffalo hunting by Indigenous peoples. In 1880 Doupe and McFee, Dominion Land Surveyors completed the land survey in the Sandy Lake area and Chief South Quill and his people settled at Rolling River First Nation while Chief Keeseekoowenin's people were settled near the Little Saskatchewan River and would eventually make their homes in Keeseekoowenin First Nation.

With the land surveyed and Indigenous peoples reserves defined, this opened the land up to settlers. By 1900, the area around Sandy Lake was still mostly uninhabited. However, by 1901 large numbers of Ukrainian settlers began arriving in the area and by 1910 most of the land had already been claimed with few plots available.

== Demographics ==
In the 2021 Census of Population conducted by Statistics Canada, Sandy Lake had a population of 301 living in 157 of its 269 total private dwellings, a change of 14% from its 2016 population of 264. With a land area of 2.01 km^{2} (0.78 sq mi), it had a population density of 149.8/km^{2} (387.9/sq mi) in 2021.
