= Municipality of Russell-Binscarth =

Rural municipality in Manitoba, Canada

Russell – Binscarth
- Rural municipality
- Municipality of Russell – Binscarth
- Location of the Municipality of Russell – Binscarth in Manitoba
- Coordinates: 50°43′38″N 101°22′08″W
- Country: Canada
- Province: Manitoba
- Region: Parkland
- Incorporated (amalgamated): January 1, 2015

Government
  - Reeve: Cheryl Kingdon-Chartier

Area
  - Land: 569.70 km^{2} (219.96 sq mi)

Population (2021)
  - Total: 2,596
  - Density: 4.557/km^{2} (11.80/sq mi)
- Time zone: UTC-6 (CST)
  - Summer (DST): UTC-5 (CDT)
- Postal code: R0J 1W0
- Website: russellbinscarth.com

The Municipality of Russell – Binscarth is a rural municipality (RM) in the Parkland Region of Manitoba, Canada. It is located in the far western part of the province and shares a border with the neighbouring province of Saskatchewan.

== History ==
It was incorporated on January 1, 2015, via the amalgamation of the RM of Russell, the Town of Russell, and the Village of Binscarth. It was formed as a requirement of The Municipal Amalgamations Act, which required that municipalities with a population less than 1,000 amalgamate with one or more neighbouring municipalities by 2015. The amalgamations were started by the government of Manitoba so that municipalities could reach the minimum population requirement of 1,000 in 1997 for incorporation as a municipality.

== Communities ==
- Binscarth
- Harrowby
- Johnson
- Millwood
- Russell (unincorporated urban community)

== Demographics ==
In the 2021 Census of Population conducted by Statistics Canada, Russell-Binscarth had a population of 2,596 living in 1,121 of its 1,243 total private dwellings, a change of 6.3% from its 2016 population of 2,442. With a land area of 569.7 km^{2} (220.0 sq mi), it had a population density of 4.6/km^{2} (11.8/sq mi) in 2021.
