= Elphinstone, Manitoba =

Elphinstone
- Local urban district
- Location of Elphinstone in Manitoba
- Coordinates: 50°31′52″N 100°19′19″W
- Country: Canada
- Province: Manitoba
- Region: Westman
- Time zone: UTC-6 (Central (CST))
  - Summer (DST): UTC-5 (Central (CDT))
- Postal code: R7A-R7C
- Area code: 204

Elphinstone is an unincorporated community recognized as a local urban district in the Rural Municipality of Yellowhead in the Canadian province of Manitoba. It is located northwest of Brandon, Manitoba and is on Highway 45. It is on the west bank of the Little Saskatchewan River.

The primary industry of the community is agriculture. The Keeseekoowenin Ojibway First Nation reserve is located just to the north, around the former Riding Mountain House trading post of the Hudson's Bay Company (HBC).

== History ==
Elphinstone was named after Lord Elphinstone, who came about 1880 as a guest of Robert Campbell, chief factor of the HBC, and bought about 2,000 acres (8.1 km^{2}) of land on the Little Saskatchewan River. Elphinstone post office was established 1 August 1887 with John A. McDonald as first postmaster.
