= Waywayseecappo First Nation =

First Nations band government in Manitoba, Canada

Coordinates: 50°40′30″N 100°55′35″W

- Band No. 285
- Waywayshegabow
- Treaty: Treaty 4
- Province: Manitoba

Land
- Main reserve: Waywayseecappo Reserve
- Reserve: Waywayseecappo Highway 10
- Land area: 100.613 km^{2} (38.847 sq mi)

Population (2021)
- On reserve: 1,743
- Off reserve: 1,397
- Total population: 3,140

Government
- Chief: Murray Clearsky

The Waywayseecappo First Nation (/ˌweɪweɪsiˈkæpoʊ/; Ojibwe: Wewezhigaabawing) is a First Nations band government whose reserve is located twenty miles (32 km) east of Russell, Manitoba, Canada. The First Nation's reserve is 10,059 hectares (24,860 acres) and is located near the southwestern corner of the Riding Mountain National Park. It is bordered by the Rural Municipality of Rossburn and the Rural Municipality of Riding Mountain West. The First Nation also hold interest together with 32 other First Nations on the 37.1 hectares (92 acres) Treaty Four Reserve Grounds (Indian Reserve No. 77), located adjacent to Fort Qu'Appelle. Its population was 1,219 in 2011. They are home of the MJHL team Waywayseecappo Wolverines. There are several businesses located in the Birdtail valley near PTH 45, such as a gas station, food mart, gaming centre, health centre, daycare, and community arena complex. As of April 1, 2014, the RCMP is no longer in the community, being replaced by the Manitoba First Nations Police Service.

== History ==
Chief Waywayseecappo signed Treaty 4 in 1874 at Fort Ellice. As part of the treaty, each family of five of the Ojibwe nation was guaranteed one square mile of land. With a population of 359 people at the time, this amounted to about 71.67 miles (115.34 km) of land. After the reserve size was agreed upon, land was surveyed in the area northeast of Fort Ellice which was located directly south of Riding Mountain National Park. When the land was first settled, its diverse habitats of forest, wetlands and prairie provided all the food the people required.

== Government ==
Chief Murray Clearsky

Councillor Mel Wabash
Councillor Anthony Longclaws
Councillor Paul Mentuck
Councillor Tim Cloud
Councillor Joe Gambler
Councillor Laura Brandon

== See also ==
- First Nations in Manitoba
