= Rural Municipality of Oakview =

Rural municipality in Manitoba, Canada

Oakview
- Rural municipality
- Rural Municipality of Oakview
- Location of the RM of Oakview in Manitoba
- Coordinates: 50.167°N 100.199°W
- Country: Canada
- Province: Manitoba
- Region: Westman
- Incorporated (amalgamated): January 1, 2015

Area
  - Total: 1,141.98 km^{2} (440.92 sq mi)

Population (2021)
  - Total: 1,928
  - Density: 1.688/km^{2} (4.373/sq mi)
- Time zone: UTC-6 (CST)
  - Summer (DST): UTC-5 (CDT)
- Website: rmofoakview.ca

The Rural Municipality of Oakview is a rural municipality (RM) in the Canadian province of Manitoba, incorporated on January 1, 2015 as a result of the amalgamation of the rural municipalities of Blanshard, Saskatchewan, and the town of Rapid City. It was formed as a requirement of The Municipal Amalgamations Act, which required that municipalities with a population less than 1,000 amalgamate with one or more neighbouring municipalities by 2015. The Government of Manitoba initiated these amalgamations in order for municipalities to meet the 1997 minimum population requirement of 1,000 to incorporate a municipality.

== Demographics ==
In the 2021 Census of Population conducted by Statistics Canada, Oakview had a population of 1,928 living in 781 of its 828 total private dwellings, a change of 18.6% from its 2016 population of 1,626. With a land area of 1,141.98 km^{2} (440.92 sq mi), it had a population density of 1.7/km^{2} (4.4/sq mi) in 2021.

== Communities ==
- Basswood
- Brumlie
- Cardale
- Norman
- Oak River
- Rapid City
- Riverdale
