= Onanole =

Coordinates: 50°37′21″N 99°58′05″W

- Community
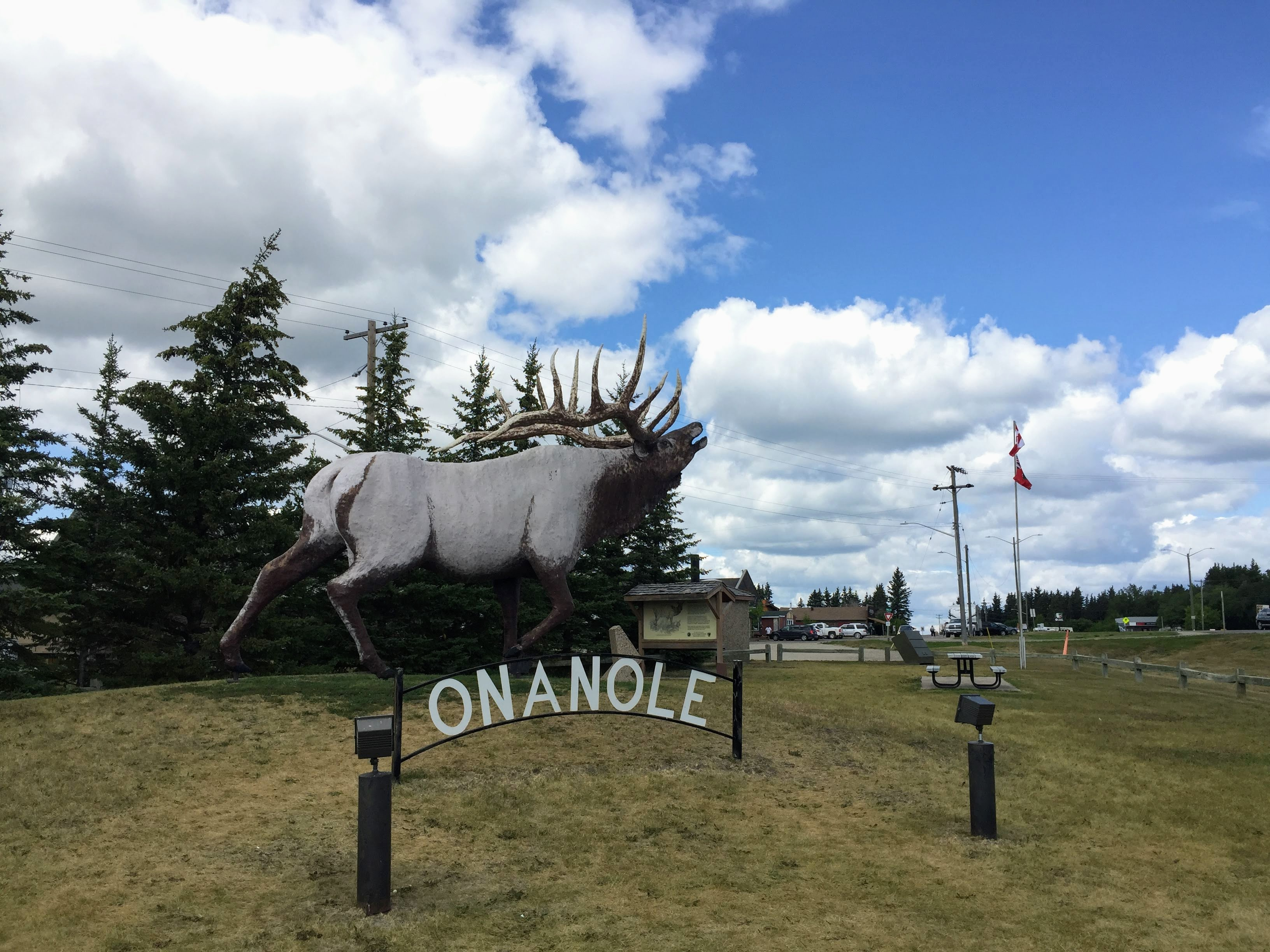
- Interactive map of Onanole
- Country: Canada
- Province: Manitoba
- Region: Westman
- Census Division: Division No. 15
- Municipality: Municipality of Harrison Park
- Recognized: 1928
- Established: 1 January 1948 (as part of Local Government District of Park)
- Incorporated: 1 January 1997 (as part of Rural Municipality of Park); 1 January 2015 (Amalgamated into Municipality of Harrison Park)
- Time zone: UTC−6 (CDT)
  - Summer (DST): UTC−5 (DST)
- Website: https://harrisonpark.ca/onanole

Onanole is a community in the Municipality of Harrison Park in Manitoba, Canada, popular as a summer colony.

Onanole is located in southwest Manitoba, at the south entrance to Riding Mountain National Park. It sits roughly 105 km (65 mi) north of the city of Brandon, and 135 km (84 mi) east of the Saskatchewan border.

The community was first recognized when a post office opened in 1928, with Neil W. Tracy as postmaster. The name was suggested by Tracy, after the Onanole Hotel in the Adirondack Mountains in northeastern New York, similarly situated "on a knoll".
