= Decker, Manitoba =

Decker
- Location of Decker in Manitoba
- Coordinates: 50°16′12″N 100°46′54″W
- Country: Canada
- Province: Manitoba
- Region: Westman Region
- Census Division: No. 15

Government
  - Governing Body: Hamiota Municipality
  - MP: Dan Mazier
  - MLA: Greg Nesbitt
- Time zone: UTC−6 (CST)
  - Summer (DST): UTC−5 (CDT)
- Postal Code: R0M 0K0
- Area code: 204
- NTS Map: 062K0&
- GNBC Code: GAGGY

Decker is an unincorporated community in southwestern Manitoba, Canada. It is located approximately 17 kilometers (10 miles) northwest of Hamiota, Manitoba in the Hamiota Municipality.

The community formed around the Decker family homestead. They arrived there in 1881 and the Post Office opened for the area in 1884 as Arrowton, named for the nearby Arrow River. In 1912 the Post Office was moved to the Decker homestead on 18-15-24W. Nowadays, there is almost nothing left, save for a church, 3 houses and a few old unused shops.
