= Cardale, Manitoba =

Village in Manitoba, Canada

Coordinates: 50.237°N 100.321°W

Cardale is a village in the Rural Municipality of Oakview, western Manitoba, in Canada.

== History ==
Cardale had its start in the year 1907 by the building of the railroad through that territory. It was incorporated as a village in 1909, but it is longer an urban municipality. Cardale was named for John Cardale, a pioneer settler.
