= Strathclair =

Community in Manitoba, Canada

Coordinates: 50°28′00″N 100°20′00″W

Location of Strathclair in Manitoba

Strathclair is a locality in the province of Manitoba in Western Canada. It is located northwest of Brandon, Manitoba and is on Highway 16. It lies within the Rural Municipality of Yellowhead. The population was 709 according to the 2016 census.

The settlement’s post office opened in 1886 on 35-16-22W and was known as Strathclair Station, became Glenforsa for a time and in 1915 changed to its present name.

== Climate ==
Strathclair is located in southwestern Manitoba and has warm summers and cold winters. The average annual precipitation is 457.1mm (18 inches) with most of it falling in the summer.

Climate data for Strathclair
Month	Jan	Feb	Mar	Apr	May	Jun	Jul	Aug	Sep	Oct	Nov	Dec	Year
Record high °C (°F)	5 (41)	11 (52)	16.5 (61.7)	33.9 (93.0)	36.7 (98.1)	38.3 (100.9)	35 (95)	36 (97)	36.7 (98.1)	31 (88)	19.4 (66.9)	8 (46)	38.3 (100.9)
Mean daily maximum °C (°F)	−12.9 (8.8)	−9 (16)	−2.1 (28.2)	8.5 (47.3)	17.3 (63.1)	21.4 (70.5)	23.7 (74.7)	23.3 (73.9)	16.8 (62.2)	9.4 (48.9)	−2.3 (27.9)	−10.4 (13.3)	7 (45)
Daily mean °C (°F)	−18.5 (−1.3)	−14.5 (5.9)	−7.5 (18.5)	2.6 (36.7)	10.7 (51.3)	15.3 (59.5)	17.4 (63.3)	16.5 (61.7)	10.5 (50.9)	3.6 (38.5)	−6.9 (19.6)	−15.4 (4.3)	1.1 (34.0)
Mean daily minimum °C (°F)	−23.9 (−11.0)	−19.9 (−3.8)	−12.8 (9.0)	−3.4 (25.9)	4 (39)	9.1 (48.4)	11.1 (52.0)	9.7 (49.5)	4 (39)	−2.3 (27.9)	−11.4 (11.5)	−20.4 (−4.7)	−4.7 (23.5)
Record low °C (°F)	−44 (−47)	−44 (−47)	−37.2 (−35.0)	−25.6 (−14.1)	−15 (5)	−3.3 (26.1)	−1.1 (30.0)	−4 (25)	−10 (14)	−22 (−8)	−36 (−33)	−43 (−45)	−44 (−47)
Average precipitation mm (inches)	21.6 (0.85)	16.8 (0.66)	22.4 (0.88)	26.4 (1.04)	43.4 (1.71)	76.2 (3.00)	71.6 (2.82)	62.6 (2.46)	46.3 (1.82)	29 (1.1)	19 (0.7)	21.9 (0.86)	457.1 (18.00)
Source: Environment Canada
