= Shoal Lake, Manitoba =

Shoal Lake
- Locality
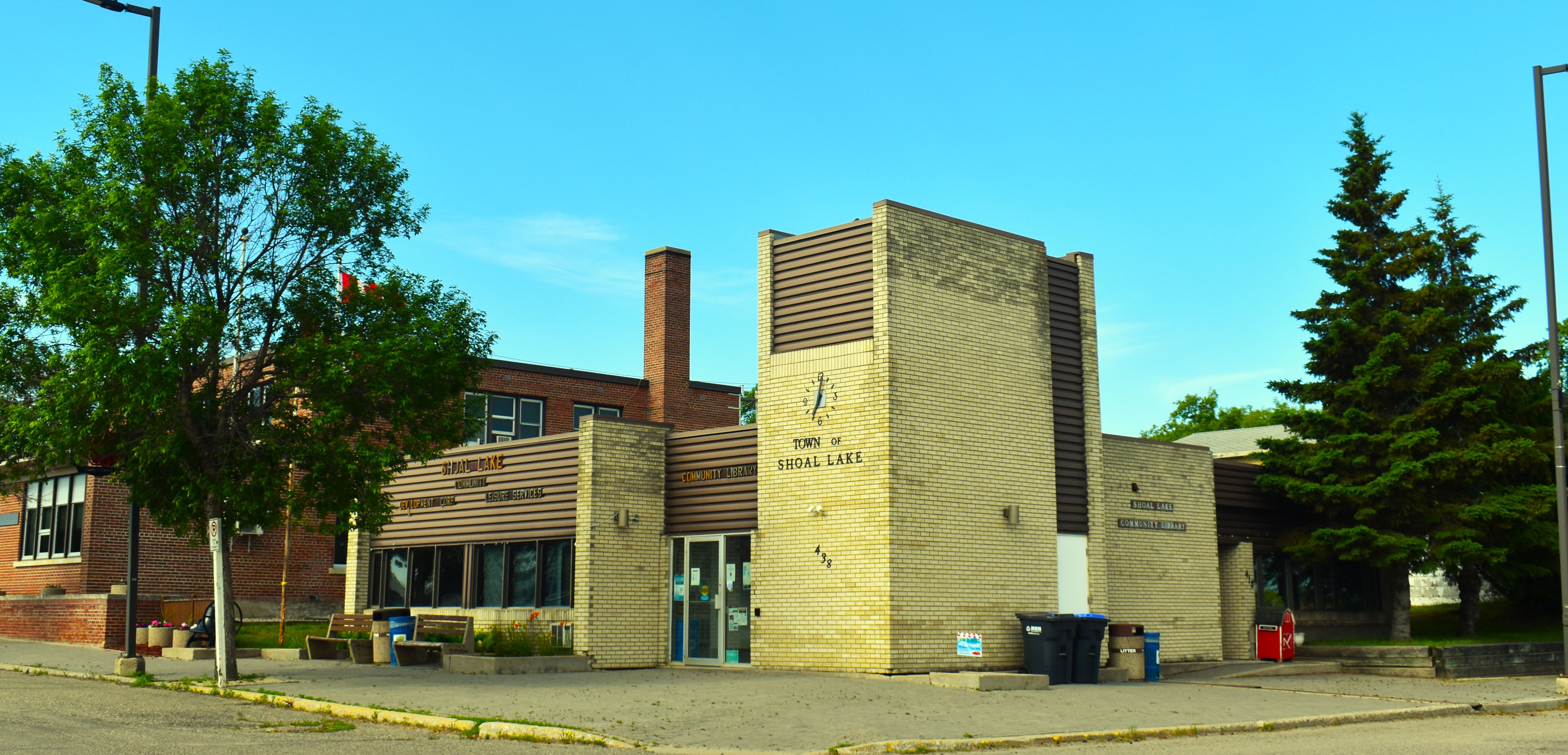
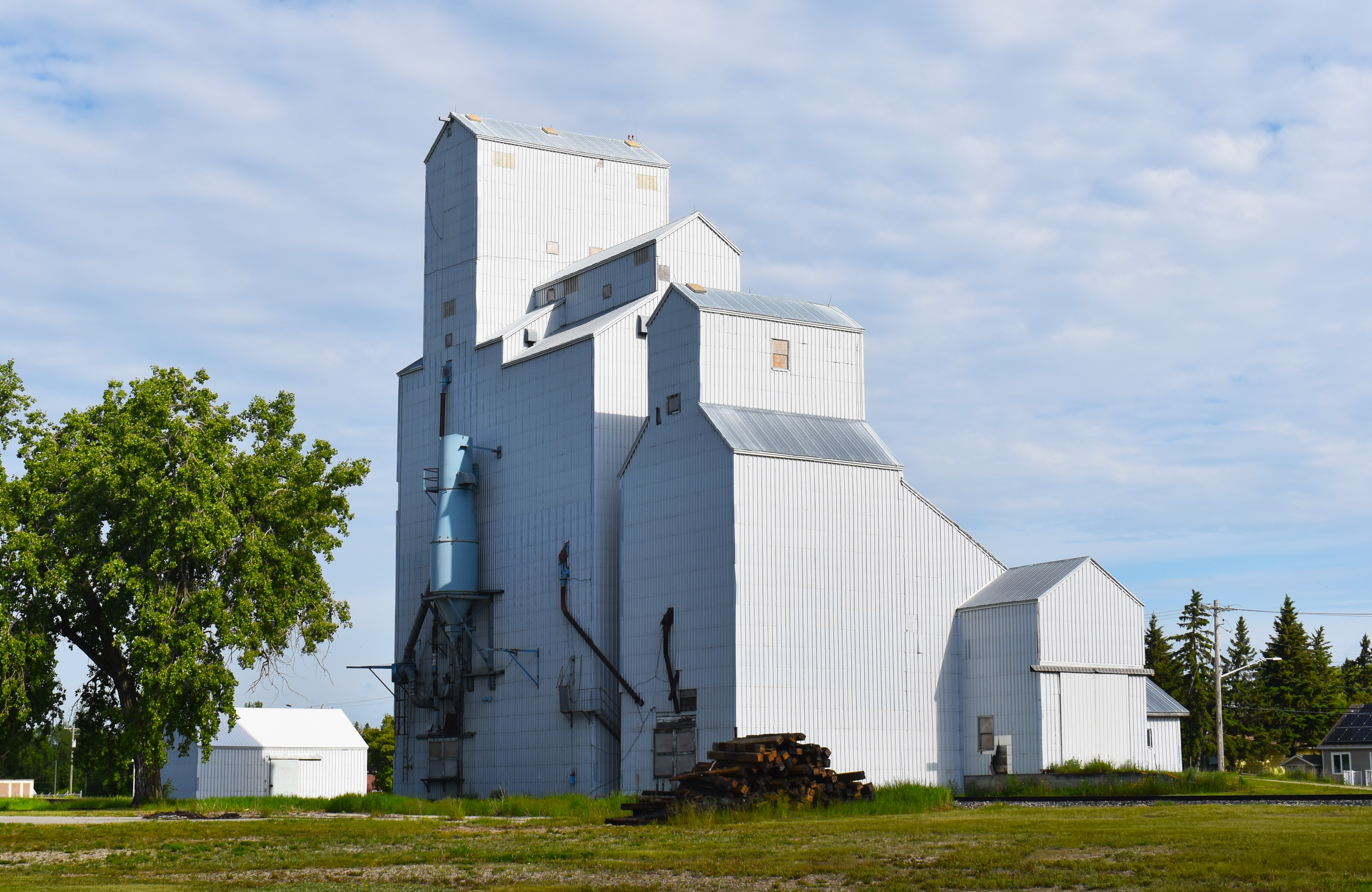
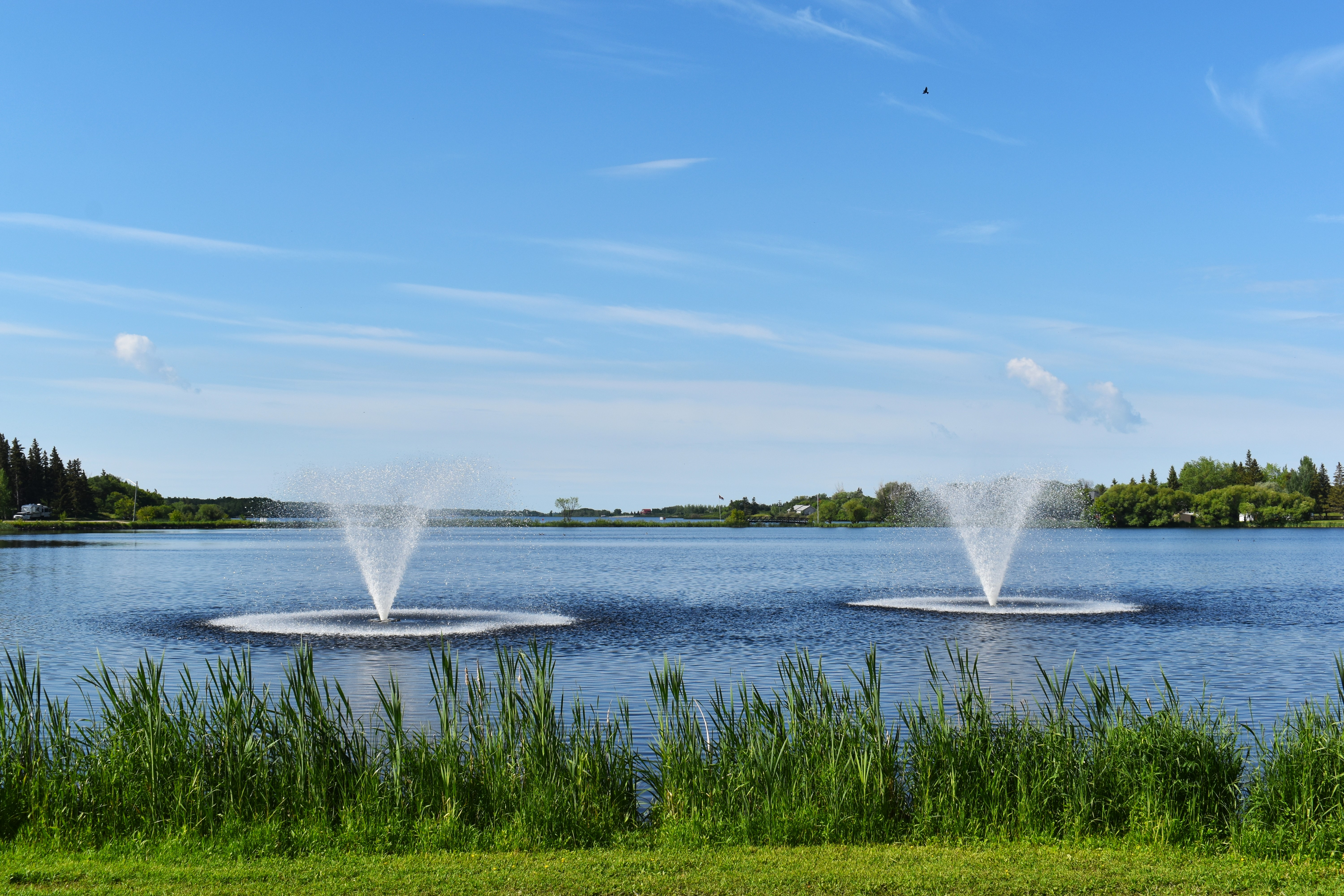
- Town of Shoal Lake building. Grain elevator in Shoal Lake. Fountains in Shoal Lake.

- Location within Manitoba
- Coordinates: 50°26′16″N 100°35′28″W
- Country: Canada
- Province: Manitoba
- Rural municipality: Rural Municipality of Yellowhead
- Incorporated (village): January 12, 1909
- Incorporated (town): October 10, 1997
- Amalgamated: January 1, 2011

Government
  - Federal riding: Brandon—Souris
  - Prov. riding: Riding Mountain

Area
  - Total: 2.52 km^{2} (0.97 sq mi)

Population (2021)
  - Total: 652
  - Density: 276.9/km^{2} (717/sq mi)
- Time zone: UTC-6 (CST)
  - Summer (DST): UTC-5 (CDT)
- Postal Code: R0J
- Area code: 204
- Website: www.shoallake.ca

Shoal Lake is a locality in the southwest of Manitoba, Canada. Originally incorporated as a town, Shoal Lake amalgamated with the Rural Municipality of Shoal Lake on January 1, 2011 to form the Municipality of Shoal Lake, which became the Rural Municipality of Yellowhead on January 1, 2015.

== History ==
Shoal Lake was first settled in 1875 when the North-West Mounted Police established a barracks along the Carlton Trail at the south end of the lake. The community was established in 1884, and moved to its current location at the lake's north side in 1885 to coincide with the building of the Manitoba & Northwestern Railroad (now CPR). The community incorporated as a village on January 12, 1909, and then changed to town status on October 10, 1997. It amalgamated with the Rural Municipality of Shoal Lake on January 1, 2011, which combined further with the Rural Municipality of Strathclair on January 1, 2015 to form the Rural Municipality of Yellowhead.

== Geography ==
The community lies to the northeast of a lake of the same name. With a length of 9 km (5.6 mi) and a stock of walleye and northern pike, the lake is a destination for boating and fishing. The lake appears on the Palliser map of 1865.

=== Climate ===
Climate data for Strathclair (15 km east)
Month	Jan	Feb	Mar	Apr	May	Jun	Jul	Aug	Sep	Oct	Nov	Dec	Year
Record high °C (°F)	5 (41)	11 (52)	16.5 (61.7)	33.9 (93.0)	36.7 (98.1)	38.3 (100.9)	35 (95)	38 (100)	36.7 (98.1)	31 (88)	19.4 (66.9)	8 (46)	38.3 (100.9)
Mean daily maximum °C (°F)	−11.7 (10.9)	−8.7 (16.3)	−1.9 (28.6)	9 (48)	16.8 (62.2)	21.2 (70.2)	23.7 (74.7)	23.5 (74.3)	17.4 (63.3)	9 (48)	−2.1 (28.2)	−9.4 (15.1)	7.2 (45.0)
Daily mean °C (°F)	−17.1 (1.2)	−14.2 (6.4)	−7.1 (19.2)	2.9 (37.2)	10.2 (50.4)	15.3 (59.5)	17.7 (63.9)	16.8 (62.2)	10.9 (51.6)	3.3 (37.9)	−6.7 (19.9)	−14.3 (6.3)	1.5 (34.7)
Mean daily minimum °C (°F)	−22.5 (−8.5)	−19.6 (−3.3)	−12.3 (9.9)	−3.2 (26.2)	3.6 (38.5)	9.3 (48.7)	11.6 (52.9)	10 (50)	4.4 (39.9)	−2.4 (27.7)	−11.2 (11.8)	−19.3 (−2.7)	−4.3 (24.3)
Record low °C (°F)	−45 (−49)	−44 (−47)	−38.5 (−37.3)	−25.6 (−14.1)	−15 (5)	−3.3 (26.1)	−1.1 (30.0)	−4 (25)	−10 (14)	−22 (−8)	−36 (−33)	−43 (−45)	−45 (−49)
Average precipitation mm (inches)	21.6 (0.85)	16.8 (0.66)	22.4 (0.88)	26.4 (1.04)	43.4 (1.71)	76.2 (3.00)	71.6 (2.82)	62.6 (2.46)	46.3 (1.82)	29 (1.1)	19 (0.7)	21.9 (0.86)	457.1 (18.00)
Source: Environment Canada (normals and extremes from 1981-2010)

== Demographics ==
In the 2021 Census of Population conducted by Statistics Canada, Shoal Lake had a population of 652 living in 307 of its 342 total private dwellings, a change of −7% from its 2016 population of 701. With a land area of 2.52 km^{2} (0.97 sq mi), it had a population density of 258.7/km^{2} (670.1/sq mi) in 2021.

== Attractions ==
The community has a nine-hole golf course and hosts facilities for baseball, ice hockey, curling, and pickle-ball. It is home to the province's official museum to the North-West Mounted Police, which was built in 1984 to replicate barracks established at the south end of the lake in 1875.

== Infrastructure ==
Shoal Lake is located at the junction of highways 16, 21, and 42. It is serviced by the Shoal Lake Airport and Shoal Lake Water Aerodrome and by the Greyhound bus service (freight only).

== Notable residents ==
- Robert Beamish - Physician
- Bob Brown - Wrestler
- Glen Findlay - Politician
- Greg Nesbitt - Politician
- William J. Short - Politician
