= Angusville =

- Local urban district
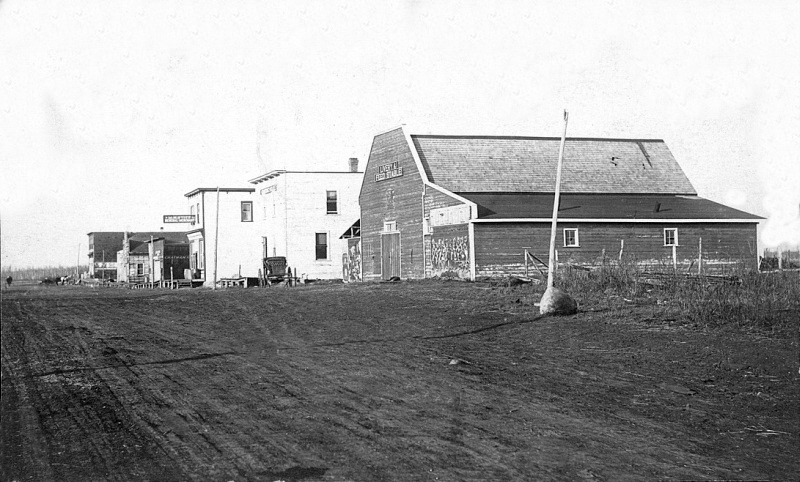
- Angusville, 1910

- Location within Manitoba
- Coordinates: 50.73556°N 101.02056°W
- Country: Canada
- Province: Manitoba
- Municipality: RM of Riding Mountain West
- First settled: 1884

Angusville is a local urban district in the Rural Municipality of Riding Mountain West, Manitoba, Canada. It was named after a pioneer family with the surname Angus.

The Trans Canada Trail passes through Angusville.

== History ==
The Angusville Ukrainian People's Home of Ivan Franko was constructed in 1934 by members of the Ukrainian community of Angusville and surrounding areas. It is adorned with three domes or banyas, of the type more typically seen in Ukrainian church architecture. Only a few national homes in Manitoba possess this feature.

== Economy ==
Angusville has a mechanic garage and a used furniture store. Residents must travel to the nearby Town of Russell for a wider range of services.

The community also generates revenue through the fundraising such as the Angusville Poker Derby, Angusville Sports Day and Slow Pitch tournament, and renting out the Angusville Arena and ball diamond to various local sports teams and for other events.

== Sports ==
The Angusville Flyers Seniors Men Hockey team won the league title in 1969-70, 1976–77, and 1980–81.

The Angusville Cardinals seniors men's team won many league titles and provincial titles. In 2004, the senior men's baseball team, the 1963 Angusville Cardinals, were inducted into the Baseball Manitoba Hall of Fame.
