= Olha, Manitoba =

Coordinates: 50°40′08″N 100°33′19″W

Olha is a locality in the Rossburn Municipality, Manitoba, home to a Ukrainian community.

The few buildings in Olha are a church, a community hall, and the Olha general store.

Of note in the Olha area is a mass grave where the remains of 43 Ukrainian settlers (three adults and 40 children) are buried. The settlers died during an epidemic of scarlet fever shortly after their arrival in 1899. Several monuments mark this site. Also nearby are two reconstructions of mud huts as built by the settlers. Some of the early Ukrainian settlers to the area did not have time to build permanent dwellings, having arrived too late in the year and on the verge of winter. In the interim, they built short-term, earthen shelters in the ground. In Ukrainian, a dwelling of this type is called a buda (буда).
