= Vista, Manitoba =

Coordinates: 50°37′13″N 100°43′04″W

Vista is an unincorporated community in the Rural Municipality of Rossburn, Manitoba, Canada.

It is the home of Regina Pats prospects Mackenzie Belinski, who also went first overall in the 2015 Manitoba Junior Hockey League draft, and Cole Muir, whose MJHL rights belong with the Waywayseecappo Wolverines.
