= Oak River =

Coordinates: 50.136°N 100.430°W

Oak River is an unincorporated community recognized as a local urban district in the Rural Municipality of Oakview, western Manitoba, Canada.

== History ==
The first settlers to the area arrived towards the end of the 1870s. Oak River itself was laid out in about 1889 when the railroad was extended to that point. In 1891, the subdistrict of Oak River had a population of 723.
