= Little Saskatchewan River =

River in Manitoba, Canada

Coordinates: 49°52′18″N 100°07′12″W

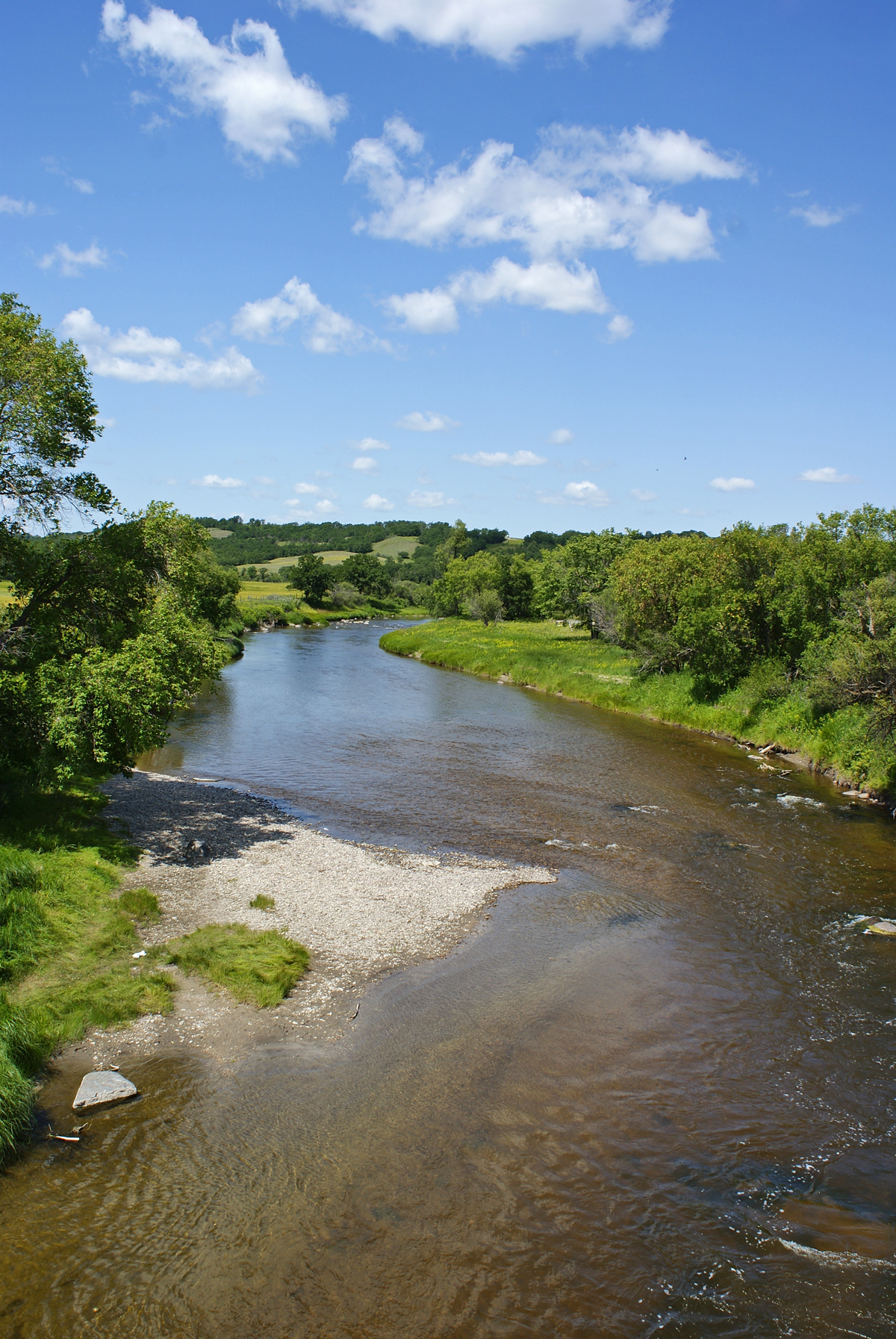
- Little Saskatchewan River near its mouth at the Assiniboine River

- Little Saskatchewan River drainage basin

- Location of river's mouth in Manitoba Little Saskatchewan River (Canada)

Location
- Country: Canada

Physical characteristics
- Source
  - location: Lake Audy
- Mouth
  - location: Assiniboine River
- Length: 185 km (115 mi)
- Basin size: 3,600 km^{2} (1,400 sq mi)

The Little Saskatchewan River is a river in western Manitoba. It originates in Riding Mountain National Park at Lake Audy and flows about 65 miles (105 km) south through the communities of Minnedosa and Rapid City. Its approximate length is 185 km. It joins the Assiniboine River about 6 miles (9.7 km) west of Brandon. The watershed has an area of 1,400 square miles (3,600 km^{2}). The watershed includes numerous lakes and three man-made reservoirs (Minnedosa Lake, Rapid City Reservoir and Lake Wahtopanah.

== History ==
In 1911 the Geographic Board of Canada adopted the name Minnedosa River but restored the original name in 1978. Some early settlers to the area arrived when the river was in flood and thought it was the Saskatchewan River.

The maximum mean daily discharge near Rivers, Manitoba was 9,800 cubic feet (280 m^{3}) per second on July 1, 2020, about 2.7 times the previous record from 1969. Average annual runoff is about 115,000 acre-feet (142,000,000 m^{3}), the equivalent of 1.4 inches (36 mm) from the entire area or about 7% of the total annual precipitation.

== See also ==
- List of rivers of Manitoba
