= Oakburn =

Coordinates: 50°33′55″N 100°34′44″W

- Unincorporated community
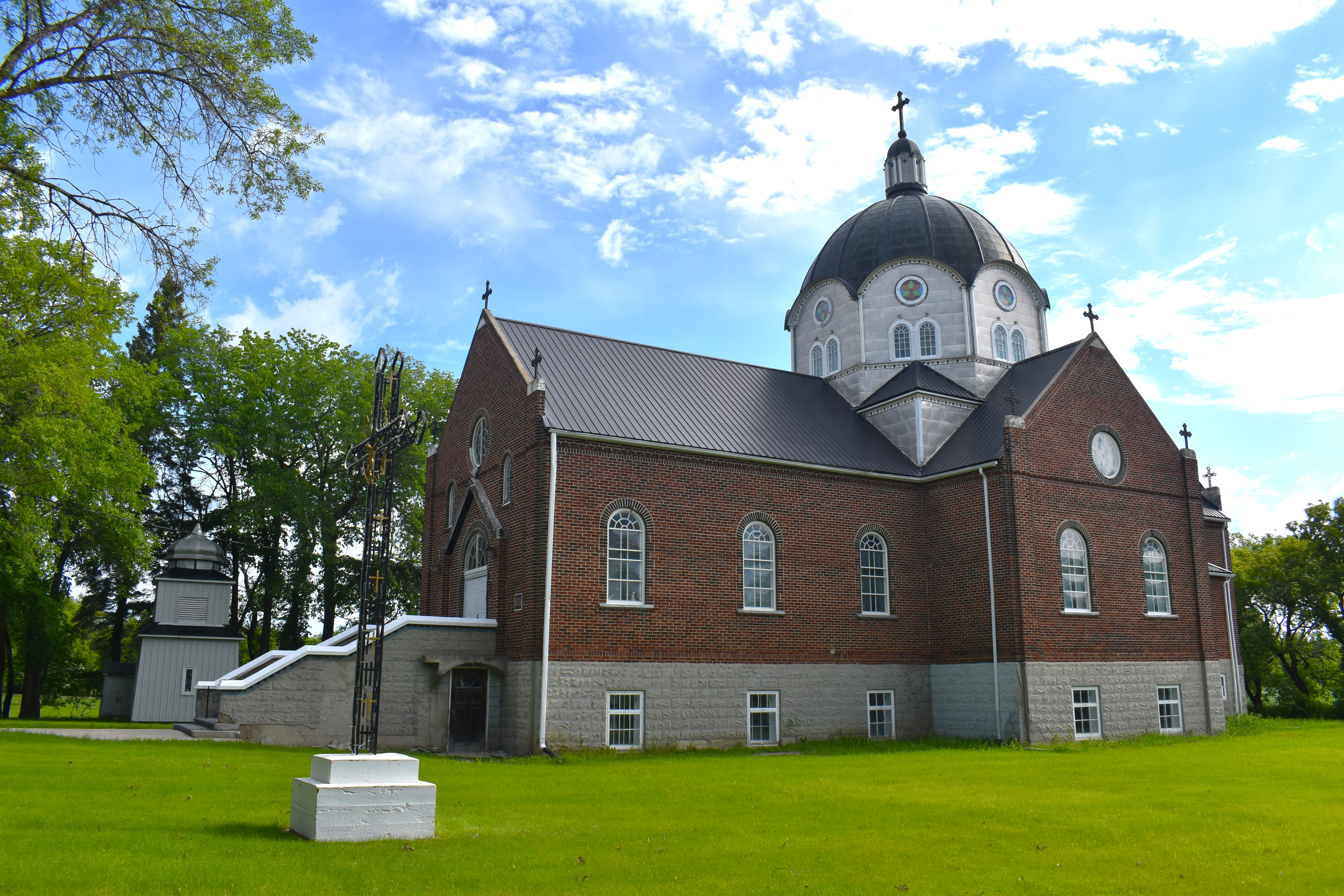
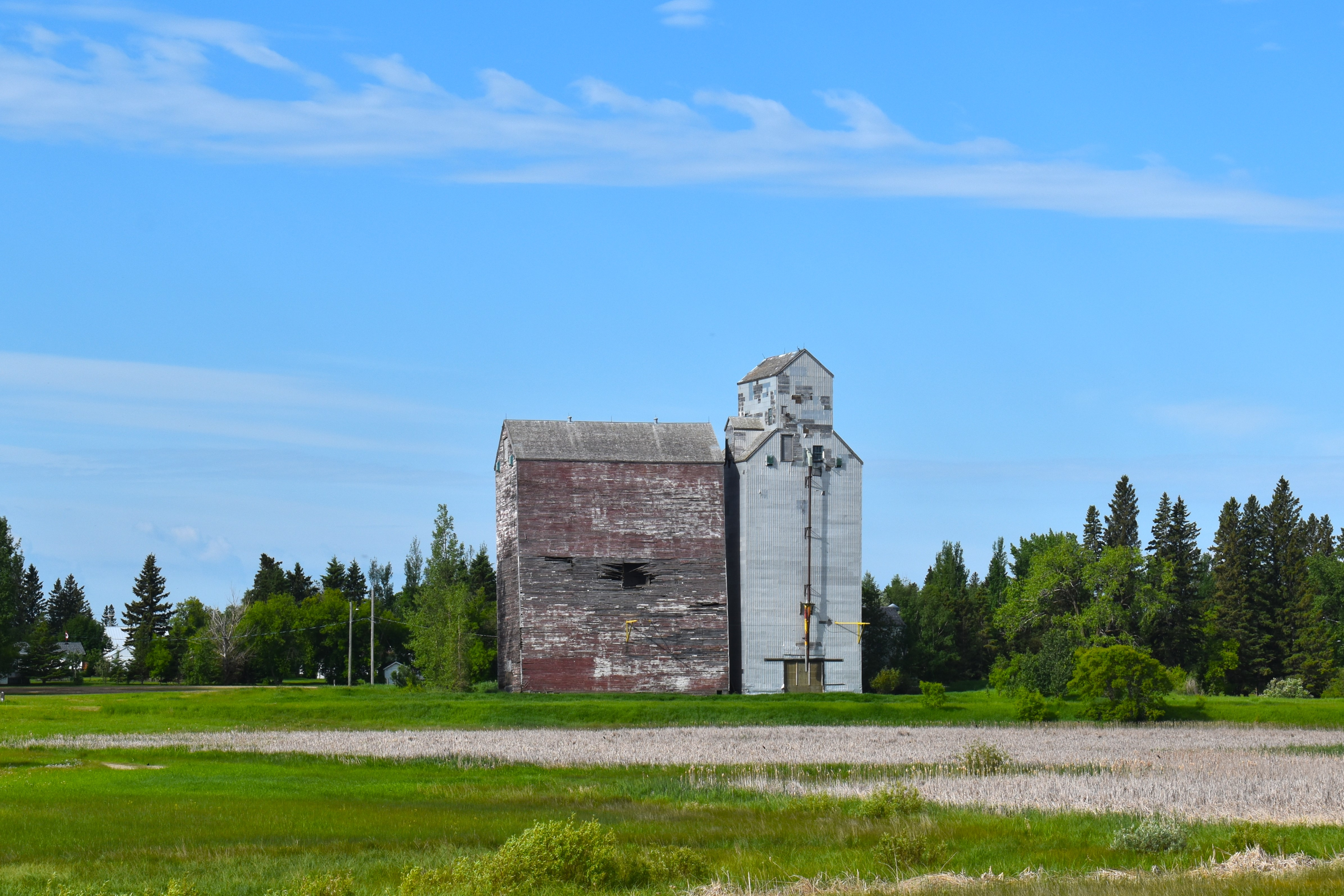
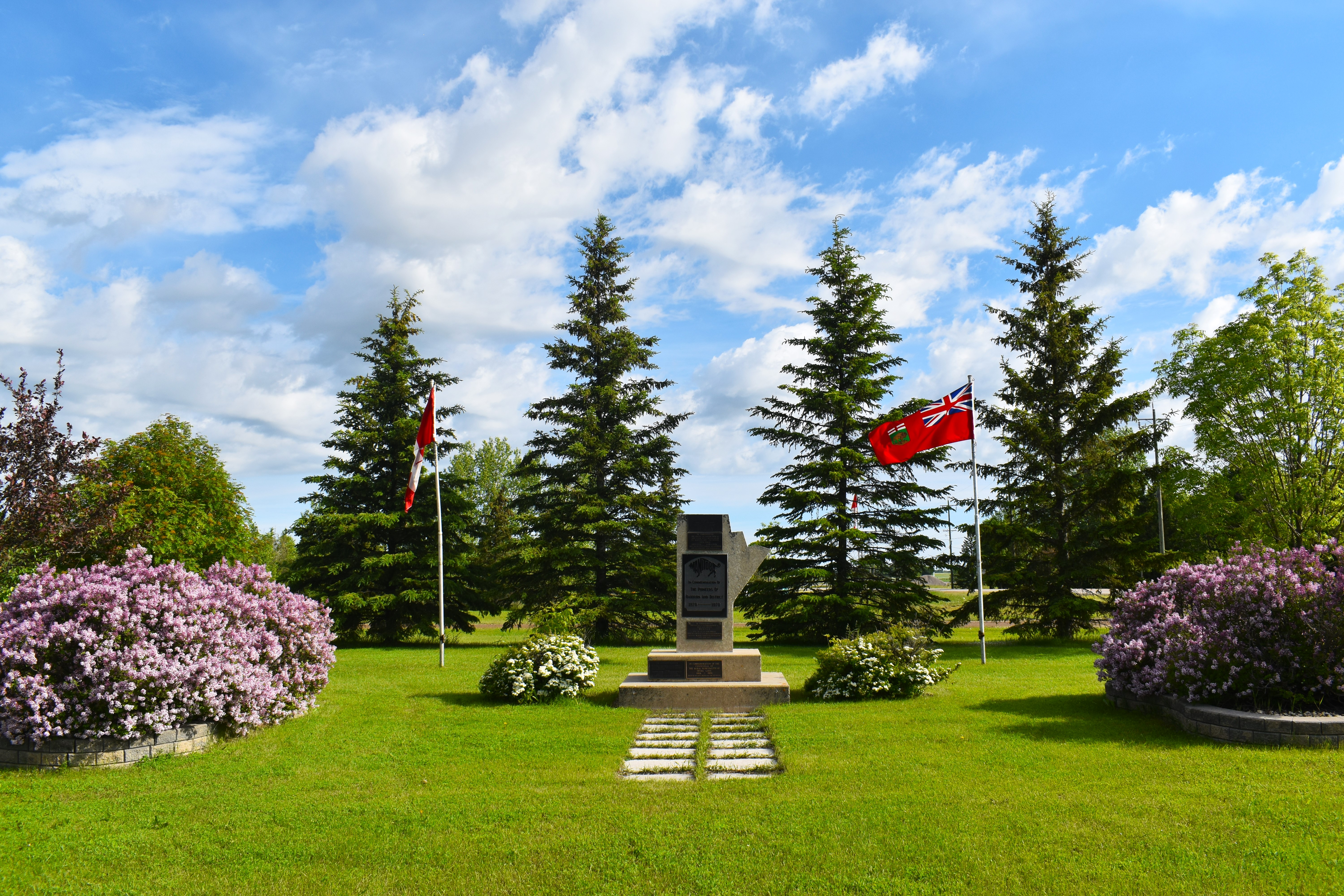
- Holy Eucharist Ukrainian Catholic parish in Oakburn. Old grain elevator in Oakburn. Oakburn and District Pioneers monument.

- Location within Manitoba
- Country: Canada
- Province: Manitoba
- Rural Municipality: Yellowhead

Oakburn is a community in the Rural Municipality of Yellowhead, Manitoba, Canada.

Oakburn is located at the junction of Highway #21 and #45, 14 km north of Shoal Lake. It began when the Canadian National Railway was built in 1906. Although it was named by Scottish settlers, the area boasts a strong Ukrainian heritage with many historical sites still well preserved.

There is a Nursery School program available in the former Oakburn School. A Ukrainian Catholic and Ukrainian Orthodox Church are located in town and the Catholic Church also has a Parish Hall. The Oakburn Memorial Rink has two sheets of natural curling ice and a natural ice skating rink.

The Rossburn Sub-Division of the TransCanada Trail passes through the community. Oakburn has a general store and fuel station/garage.
