= Rural Municipality of Yellowhead =

Rural municipality in Manitoba, Canada

Yellowhead
- Rural municipality
- Yellowhead Municipality
- Location of the RM of Yellowhead in Manitoba
- Coordinates: 50°29′05″N 100°28′58″W
- Country: Canada
- Province: Manitoba
- Region: Westman
- Incorporated (amalgamated): January 1, 2015

Population (2021)
  - Total: 1,841
- Time zone: UTC-6 (CST)
  - Summer (DST): UTC-5 (CDT)
- Website: www.yellowheadmunicipality.ca

The Rural Municipality of Yellowhead is a rural municipality (RM) in the Canadian province of Manitoba.

== History ==
The municipality was incorporated on January 1, 2015 via the amalgamation of the Municipality of Shoal Lake and the RM of Strathclair. It was formed as a requirement of The Municipal Amalgamations Act, which required that municipalities with a population less than 1,000 amalgamate with one or more neighbouring municipalities by 2015. The Government of Manitoba initiated these amalgamations in order for municipalities to meet the 1997 minimum population requirement of 1,000 to incorporate a municipality.

== Communities ==
- Elphinstone
- Oakburn
- Shoal Lake
- Strathclair

== Demographics ==
In the 2021 Census of Population conducted by Statistics Canada, Yellowhead had a population of 1,841 living in 871 of its 1,227 total private dwellings, a change of −5.5% from its 2016 population of 1,948. With a land area of 1,093.17 km^{2} (422.08 sq mi), it had a population density of 1.7/km^{2} (4.4/sq mi) in 2021.
