= Rossburn =

Town in Manitoba, Canada

Coordinates: 50°40′09″N 100°48′40″W

Rossburn is an unincorporated urban community in the Rossburn Municipality, Manitoba. Prior to 1 January 2015, Rossburn was designated as a town. It is near Waywayseecappo First Nation. There is an elementary school and a high school.

== History ==
In 1891, the subdistrict of Rossburn had a population of 551.

=== 2026 tornado ===
On the evening of June 28, 2026, a large EF3 tornado struck the Rossburn area, heavily damaging two homes, snapping large trees, and flipping vehicles.

== Demographics ==
In the 2021 Census of Population conducted by Statistics Canada, Rossburn had a population of 489 living in 239 of its 285 total private dwellings, a change of -4.5% from its 2016 population of 512. With a land area of 3.43 km^{2} (1.32 sq mi), it had a population density of 142.6/km^{2} (369.2/sq mi) in 2021.
