= Municipality of Harrison Park =

Rural municipality in Manitoba, Canada

Harrison Park
- Rural municipality
- Municipality of Harrison Park
- Location of the RM of Harrison Park in Manitoba
- Coordinates: 50.464°N 100.077°W
- Country: Canada
- Province: Manitoba
- Region: Westman
- Incorporated (amalgamated): January 1, 2015

Area
  - Total: 964.55 km^{2} (372.41 sq mi)

Population (2021)
  - Total: 1,852
  - Density: 1.920/km^{2} (4.973/sq mi)
- Time zone: UTC-6 (CST)
  - Summer (DST): UTC-5 (CDT)
- Website: harrisonpark.ca

The Municipality of Harrison Park is a rural municipality (RM) in the Canadian province of Manitoba that incorporated on January 1, 2015 via the amalgamation of the RMs of Harrison and Park. It was formed as a requirement of The Municipal Amalgamations Act, which required that municipalities with a population less than 1,000 amalgamate with one or more neighbouring municipalities by 2015. The Government of Manitoba initiated these amalgamations in order for municipalities to meet the 1997 minimum population requirement of 1,000 to incorporate a municipality.

Harrison Park is located south of Riding Mountain National Park.

== Demographics ==
In the 2021 Census of Population conducted by Statistics Canada, Harrison Park had a population of 1,852 living in 910 of its 1,769 total private dwellings, a change of 14.5% from its 2016 population of 1,617. With a land area of 964.55 km^{2} (372.41 sq mi), it had a population density of 1.9/km^{2} (5.0/sq mi) in 2021.
