= Manitoba Highway 21 =

Provincial highway in Manitoba, Canada

Provincial Trunk Highway 21
- PTH 21 highlighted in red

Route information
- Maintained by Department of Infrastructure
- Length: 189 km (117 mi)
- Existed: 1928–present

Major junctions
- South end: ND 14 at the U.S. border near Deloraine
- PTH 3 at Deloraine; PTH 23 at Hartney; PTH 2 near Souris; PTH 1 (TCH) at Griswold; PTH 24 near Hamiota; PTH 16 (TCH) / YH at Shoal Lake
- North end: PTH 45 / PR 577 at Oakburn

Location
- Country: Canada
- Province: Manitoba
- Rural municipalities: Deloraine – Winchester; Grassland; Hamiota; Sifton; Whitehead; Wallace – Woodworth; Yellowhead

Highway system
- Provincial highways in Manitoba; Winnipeg City Routes
| ← PTH 20A | → PTH 22 |

Provincial Trunk Highway 21 (PTH 21) is a provincial highway in the Canadian province of Manitoba. It runs from the U.S. border (where it meets with ND 14) to PTH 45 and PR 577 in the village of Oakburn.

PTH 21 is two lanes and runs north–south in the southwestern region of the province. It is the main highway for the towns of Deloraine (where it meets PTH 3), Hartney, Hamiota, and Shoal Lake.

The speed limit is 90 km/h (55 mph).

In 2012, PTH 21 was given the dubious distinction of being named the second-worst road in the province that year.

== Route description ==
PTH 21 begins in the Rural Municipality of Deloraine - Winchester at the North Dakota border, with the road continuing south towards Carbury and Bottineau as North Dakota Highway 14 (ND 14). Travelling along the western edge of Turtle Mountain, the highway heads north, running along the border with the Rural Municipality of Brenda - Waskada, to have a junction with PR 251 before bypassing the town of Deloraine along its western side, where it has a short concurrency (overlap) with PTH 3 (Boundary Commission Trail), crossing a small creek. It travels through the community of Dand before entering the Rural Municipality of Grassland.

PTH 21 continues north, having intersections with PR 345 and PTH 23, before passage through the town of Hartney, where it crosses the Souris River. The highway enters the Rural Municipality of Sifton and has a short concurrency with PTH 2 (Red Coat Trail) near Deleau before travelling along the borders of the Rural Municipality of Souris - Glenwood and Rural Municipality of Whitehead, having an intersection with PR 543 and crossing a causeway over some wetlands and a small lake before travelling along the eastern side of Griswold, where it junctions with PTH 1 (Trans-Canada Highway).

The highway has a junction with PR 455 and crosses the Assiniboine River into the Rural Municipality of Wallace - Woodworth, immediately making a sharp curve to the west, junctioning with PR 564 and passing through the Sioux Valley Dakota Nation. PTH 21 makes another sharp curve back to the north at an intersection with PR 463, and travels through Kenton, where it has an intersection with PR 259. The highway enters the Rural Municipality of Hamiota, passing by Oakner on its way to Parks Corner, where it junctions with PTH 24. PTH 21 now travels through the town of Hamiota, where it has an intersection with PR 469, as it heads northward past several ponds and small lakes, having a short concurrency with PR 355 5 kilometres (3.1 mi) west of McConnell, before entering the Rural Municipality of Yellowhead.

PTH 21 winds its way along Shoal Lake for a few kilometres to enter the town of Shoal Lake, traveling through neighbourhoods before making a sharp right in downtown at an intersection with The Drive, which leads to PTH 42. The highway curves back northward as it crosses a railway line, passing through more neighbourhoods before having a junction with PTH 16 (Yellowhead Highway). PTH 21 leaves Shoal Lake and heads north for several kilometres to enter Oakburn. It passes through neighbourhoods, as well as the eastern edge of downtown at the intersection with Main Street, before crossing a former railway line and coming to an intersection with PTH 45 (Russell Subdivision Trail), where PTH 21 ends and the road continues north as PR 577 towards Olha.

The entire length of Manitoba Highway 21 is a rural, paved, two-lane highway.

== History ==
The northern terminus for PTH 21 was originally located at PTH 2 in Deleau. In 1947, it extended north to PTH 1 in Griswold. In 1949, it extended north to PTH 4 in Shoal Lake, replacing part of PTH 1 and all of PTH 28. In 1960, PTH 21 extended north to its present terminus.

== Major intersections ==
| Division | Location | km | mi | Destinations | Notes |
|---|---|---|---|---|---|
| Deloraine-Winchester | | 0 | 0.0 | ND 14 south – Bottineau | Continuation into North Dakota |
| Deloraine-Winchester | | 0 | 0.0 | Canada–United States border at the Carbury–Goodlands Border Crossing | |
| Deloraine-Winchester | | 12 | 7.5 | PR 251 west – Waskada | |
| Deloraine-Winchester | Deloraine | 22 | 14 | PTH 3 east (Boundary Commission Trail) – Killarney | Southern end of PTH 3 concurrency |
| Deloraine-Winchester | | 30 | 19 | PTH 3 west (Boundary Commission Trail) – Melita, Medora | Northern end of PTH 3 concurrency |
| Deloraine-Winchester | | 40 | 25 | Dand-Regent-Croll Road (Road 23 North) | Former PR 343 east |
| Grassland | | 46 | 29 | PR 345 west – Lauder | |
| Grassland | | 51 | 32 | PTH 23 east – Elgin | |
| Grassland | Hartney | | | River Avenue | Former PR 347 east |
| Grassland | | 60 | 37 | PR 541 west – Grande-Clairière | Former PR 347 west |
| Sifton | | 69 | 43 | PTH 2 west (Red Coat Trail) – Pipestone | Southern end of PTH 2 concurrency |
| Sifton–Souris-Glenwood line | | 77 | 48 | PTH 2 east (Red Coat Trail) – Souris | Northern end of PTH 2 concurrency |
| Sifton–Souris-Glenwood line | | 82 | 51 | PR 543 west – Oak Lake Beach | |
| Sifton–Whitehead line | | 90 | 56 | Road 50 North | Former PR 349 east |
| Sifton–Whitehead line | Griswold | 95 | 59 | PTH 1 (TCH) – Virden, Brandon | |
| Wallace-Woodworth–Whitehead line | | 102 | 63 | PR 455 east – Alexander | |
| Wallace-Woodworth–Whitehead line | | 103 | 64 | Crosses over Assiniboine River | |
| Wallace-Woodworth | Sioux Valley Dakota Nation | 104 | 65 | PR 564 north – Bradwardine, Rivers | Former PR 354 north |
| Wallace-Woodworth | | 113 | 70 | PR 463 west – Virden | |
| Wallace-Woodworth | | 126 | 78 | PR 259 – Kenton, Harding, Rivers | |
| Hamiota | | 138 | 86 | Road 74N – Oakner | |
| Hamiota | | 142 | 88 | PTH 24 – Miniota, Oak River, Rapid City | |
| Hamiota | Hamiota | 147 | 91 | PR 469 west (Birch Avenue) | |
| Hamiota | | 154 | 96 | PR 355 east – Minnedosa | Southern end of PR 355 concurrency |
| Hamiota | | 157 | 98 | PR 355 west – Decker | Northern end of PR 355 concurrency |
| Yellowhead | | 167 | 104 | Southern end Road (Road 93 North) | Former PR 477 west |
| Yellowhead | Shoal Lake | | | The Drive to PTH 42 | |
| Yellowhead | Shoal Lake | 175 | 109 | PTH 16 (TCH) / YH – Russell, Minnedosa | |
| Yellowhead | Oakburn | 189 | 117 | PTH 45 (Russell Subdivision Trail) / PR 577 north – Olha, Rossburn, Elphinstone | Former PR 566 north |
1.000 mi = 1.609 km; 1.000 km = 0.621 mi: Concurrency terminus; Route transition

== Related routes ==
=== Provincial Road 455 ===
Provincial Road 455
- Location: Rural Municipality of Whitehead
- Length: 11.6 km (7.2 mi)
- Existed: 1966–present

Provincial Road 455 (PR 455) is a 11.6-kilometre-long (7.2 mi) east–west spur of PTH 21 in the Rural Municipality of Whitehead, providing access to the town of Alexander.

=== Provincial Road 463 ===
Provincial Road 463
- Road 59N
- Location: Rural Municipality of Wallace-Woodworth
- Length: 3.8 km (2.4 mi)
- Existed: 1966–present

Provincial Road 463 (PR 463) is a short 3.8-kilometre-long (2.4 mi) east–west spur of PTH 21 in the eastern portion of the Rural Municipality of Wallace-Woodworth, providing access to, via PR 254 and PR 259, the town of Virden. It is entirely a two-lane gravel road, with no settlements or other major intersections along its length.

| Division | Location | km | mi | Destinations | Notes |
|---|---|---|---|---|---|
| Wallace-Woodworth | | 0.0 | 0.0 | PR 254 – Virden, Oak Lake | Western terminus; road continues west as PR 254 northbound |
| Wallace-Woodworth | | 3.8 | 2.4 | PTH 21 – Griswold, Kenton | Eastern terminus |
1.000 mi = 1.609 km; 1.000 km = 0.621 mi

=== Provincial Road 469 ===
Provincial Road 469
- Road 80N, Birch Avenue
- Location: Prairie View Municipality - Hamiota Municipality
- Length: 13.1 km (8.1 mi)
- Existed: 1966–present

Provincial Road 469 (PR 469) is a 13.1-kilometre-long (8.1 mi) east–west spur of PTH 21, running from the town of Hamiota to PR 264 between Crandall and Decker, within both the Prairie View Municipality and the Hamiota Municipality. It is entirely a two-lane road, with the segment in the town of Hamiota, also known as Birch Avenue, being paved, while the rest is gravel.

Prior to 1992, PR 469 continued east through town along Birch Avenue past PTH 21 to come to an end 13.5 kilometres (8.4 mi) later at an intersection with PR 354 along the banks of the Oak River.

| Division | Location | km | mi | Destinations | Notes |
|---|---|---|---|---|---|
| Prairie View | | 0.0 | 0.0 | PR 264 – Crandall, Decker | Western terminus; road continues west as Road 80N |
| Hamiota | Hamiota | 13.1 | 8.1 | PTH 21 (1st Street) – Shoal Lake, Kenton | Eastern terminus; road continues east as Birch Avenue (former PR 469) |
1.000 mi = 1.609 km; 1.000 km = 0.621 mi

=== Provincial Road 541 ===
Provincial Road 541
- Road 34N
- Location: Municipality of Grassland
- Length: 6.5 km (4.0 mi)
- Existed: 1992–present

Provincial Road 541 (PR 541) is a 6.5-kilometre-long (4.0 mi) east–west spur of PTH 21 in the Municipality of Grassland, providing access to the hamlet of Grande-Clairière. Starting from just north of the town of Hartney, it heads west along a former section of PR 347 to a junction with PR 254 just east of the hamlet. It is entirely a two-lane gravel road, with no other settlements or major intersections to speak of.

PR 541 was designated along its current alignment and has not changed much since. Prior to 1992, this routing was part of a much longer PR 347, while the original PR 541 (1966-1990) ran between PTH 5 (Parks Route) just south of Neelin to PR 442 north of Mather.

| Division | Location | km | mi | Destinations | Notes |
|---|---|---|---|---|---|
| Grassland | | 0.0 | 0.0 | PR 254 – Grande-Clairière, Oak Lake Beach | Western terminus; road continues west as PR 254 southbound |
| Grassland | | 6.5 | 4.0 | PTH 21 – Griswold, Hartney | Eastern terminus |
1.000 mi = 1.609 km; 1.000 km = 0.621 mi

=== Provincial Road 543 ===
Provincial Road 543
- Road 45N
- Location: Rural Municipality of Sifton
- Length: 11.5 km (7.1 mi)
- Existed: 1966–present

Provincial Road 543 (PR 543) is a 11.5-kilometre-long (7.1 mi) east-west spur of PTH 21 in the Rural Municipality of Sifton, providing access to the hamlet of Oak Lake Beach. It is entirely a two-lane gravel road, with no other major intersections or settlements to speak of as it travels through a mix of rural farmland and wooded areas.

| Division | Location | km | mi | Destinations | Notes |
|---|---|---|---|---|---|
| Sifton | | 0.0 | 0.0 | PR 254 – Grande-Clairière, Oak Lake Beach | Western terminus |
| Sifton / Souris-Glenwood boundary | | 11.5 | 7.1 | PTH 21 – Griswold, Hartney | Eastern terminus |
1.000 mi = 1.609 km; 1.000 km = 0.621 mi

=== Provincial Road 564 ===
Provincial Road 564
- Location: Sioux Valley Dakota Nation - Bradwardine
- Length: 14.7 km (9.1 mi)
- Existed: 1992–present

Provincial Road 564 (PR 564) is a 14.7-kilometre-long (9.1 mi) north–south spur of PTH 21 mostly within the Riverdale Municipality, connecting the Sioux Valley Dakota Nation with the hamlet of Bradwardine. It includes three separate crossings of the Oak River. The first 4.2 kilometres (2.6 mi) of the highway between PTH 21 and the first crossing of the Oak River is a paved, two-lane highway while the rest is gravel.

Provincial Road 564
- Westhope Road (Road 86N), Road 99W, Bethany Road, Road 98W
- Location: Minnedosa - Bethany
- Length: 13.3 km (8.3 mi)
- Existed: 1966–1990

Between 1966 and 1990, the PR 564 designation was applied to several municipal roads in the Rural Municipality of Minto-Odanah, linking the town of Minnedosa (at PR 262) with Minnedosa Airport and the hamlet of Bethany, ending at PR 471. The route is now known as Westhope Road (Road 86N), Road 99W, Bethany Road (Road 89N), and Road 98W. PR 564 was designated along its current route in 1992 and has not changed much since.

| Division | Location | km | mi | Destinations | Notes |
|---|---|---|---|---|---|
| Wallace-Woodworth | Sioux Valley Dakota Nation | 0.0 | 0.0 | PTH 21 – Griswold, Kenton | Southern terminus; southern end of paved section |
| Whitehead | No major junctions | | | | |
| Riverdale | | 4.2 | 2.6 | Bridge over the Oak River; Northern end of paved section | |
| Riverdale | | 7.4 | 4.6 | Bridge over the Oak River | |
| Riverdale | | 13.6 | 8.5 | Bridge over the Oak River | |
| Riverdale | Bradwardine | 14.7 | 9.1 | PR 259 – Kenton, Rivers | Northern terminus; former PR 354 north |
1.000 mi = 1.609 km; 1.000 km = 0.621 mi
