= List of towns in Manitoba =

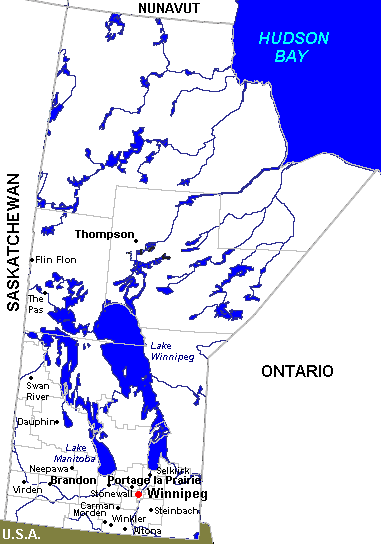
Cities and towns in Manitoba

A town is an incorporated urban municipality in the Canadian province of Manitoba. Under current legislation, a community must have a minimum population of 1,000 and a minimum density of 400 people per square kilometre to incorporate as an urban municipality. As an urban municipality, the community has the option to be named a town, village or urban municipality. It also has the option of being named a city once it has a minimum population of 7,500 (there are no towns currently eligible for city status; the closest is Niverville, with a population of 5,947 in the 2021 federal census).

Manitoba has 25 towns that had a cumulative population of 60,963 in the 2021 census. The province's largest and smallest towns by population are Niverville and Grand Rapids with populations of 5,947 and 213 respectively. The province's largest and smallest towns by land area are Gillam and Arborg with land areas of 1,994.44 km^{2} (770.06 mi^{2}) and 2.22 km^{2} (0.86 mi^{2}) respectively. The province previously had 50 towns before a series of provincially mandated amalgamations took effect on January 1, 2015.

Communities meeting the population minimum are not always incorporated as urban municipalities. There are 22 unincorporated communities with a population of more than 1,000 within Manitoba's rural municipalities. The largest of these is Oakbank in the Rural Municipality of Springfield with a population of 4,604.

== List ==
Name	Incorporation date	2021 Census of Population				
Name	Incorporation date	Population (2021)	Population (2016)	Change	Land area (km^{2})	Population density
Altona (Note: The towns of Altona, Arborg, Beausejour, Carberry, Carman, Lac du Bonnet, Melita, Niverville, Powerview-Pine Falls, Ste. Anne, Stonewall, Teulon, Virden and Winnipeg Beach were originally incorporated as villages.)	December 31, 1945	4,267	4,212	+1.3%	9.35	456.4/km^{2}
Arborg	January 1, 1964	1,279	1,232	+3.8%	2.22	576.1/km^{2}
Beausejour	November 5, 1908	3,307	3,219	+2.7%	5.42	610.1/km^{2}
Carberry	December 20, 1889	1,818	1,738	+4.6%	4.80	378.8/km^{2}
Carman	November 3, 1899	3,114	3,164	−1.6%	4.32	720.8/km^{2}
Churchill (Note: The towns of Churchill, Gillam, Grand Rapids, Leaf Rapids, Lynn Lake and Snow Lake were originally incorporated as local government districts.)	January 1, 1959	870	899	−3.2%	50.83	17.1/km^{2}
Gillam	May 1, 1966	1,007	1,201	−16.2%	1,994.44	0.5/km^{2}
Grand Rapids	March 1, 1962	213	268	−20.5%	74.27	2.9/km^{2}
Lac du Bonnet	December 31, 1947	1,064	1,089	−2.3%	2.26	470.8/km^{2}
Leaf Rapids	December 1, 1971	351	582	−39.7%	1,237.66	0.3/km^{2}
Lynn Lake	May 9, 1959	579	494	+17.2%	867.53	0.7/km^{2}
Melita	May 15, 1902	1,041	1,042	−0.1%	3.19	326.3/km^{2}
Minnedosa	March 2, 1883	2,741	2,449	+11.9%	14.95	183.3/km^{2}
Morris	January 29, 1883	1,975	1,885	+4.8%	5.91	334.2/km^{2}
Neepawa	November 23, 1883	5,685	4,609	+23.3%	17.09	332.7/km^{2}
Niverville	January 1, 1969	5,947	4,610	+29.0%	8.70	683.6/km^{2}
The Pas	May 17, 1912	5,639	5,369	+5.0%	44.69	126.2/km^{2}
Powerview-Pine Falls (Note: The Town of Powerview-Pine Falls originally incorporated under the name of the Village of Powerview. Its renaming occurred on May 1, 2005 when it simultaneously absorbed the neighbouring community of Pine Falls and changed to town status.)	January 1, 1951	1,239	1,316	−5.9%	4.82	257.1/km^{2}
Snow Lake	June 2, 1947	1,088	899	+21.0%	1,166.64	0.9/km^{2}
Ste. Anne	January 1, 1963	2,891	2,114	+36.8%	4.14	698.3/km^{2}
Stonewall	August 14, 1906	5,046	4,809	+4.9%	5.96	846.6/km^{2}
Swan River	May 11, 1908	4,049	4,014	+0.9%	6.81	594.6/km^{2}
Teulon	May 6, 1919	1,196	1,201	−0.4%	3.23	370.3/km^{2}
Virden	August 2, 1890	3,118	3,322	−6.1%	8.96	348.0/km^{2}
Winnipeg Beach	November 2, 1909	1,439	1,145	+25.7%	3.91	368.0/km^{2}
Total	—	60,963	56,882	+7.2%	5,552.10	11.0/km^{2}

== Former towns ==
A list of formerly incorporated towns, excluding current and former cities that previously held town status. (Note: The cities of Dauphin, Flin Flon, Morden, Portage la Prairie, Selkirk, Steinbach, Thompson and Winkler were formerly incorporated as towns.) (Note: The former cities of St. Boniface, East Kildonan, Transcona, and West Kildonan (all amalgamated into the City of Winnipeg in 1972) were also formerly incorporated as towns prior to becoming cities.)

Name	Dissolved	Currently part of
Birtle (Note: The Manitoba government amalgamated 65 rural municipalities, 25 towns, and 17 villages into 47 municipalities on January 1, 2015 in order to bring these municipalities into compliance with the minimum population requirements of the Municipal Act.)	January 1, 2015	Prairie View Municipality
Boissevain	January 1, 2015	Municipality of Boissevain – Morton
Brooklands (Note: The Town of Brooklands amalgamated with the City of St. James in 1969; part of the City of Winnipeg since January 1, 1972.)	January 1, 1969	City of Winnipeg
Deloraine	January 1, 2015	Municipality of Deloraine – Winchester
East Selkirk (Note: The former Town of East Selkirk was incorporated in 1883 and later dissolved in 1904.)	February 8, 1904	Rural Municipality of St. Clements
Emerson (Note: The former Town of Emerson amalgamated with the municipality of West Lynne in 1883 and briefly held city status from 1883 to 1886.)	January 1, 2015	Municipality of Emerson – Franklin
Erickson	January 1, 2015	Municipality of Clanwilliam – Erickson
Ethelbert	January 1, 2015	Municipality of Ethelbert
Gilbert Plains	January 1, 2015	Gilbert Plains Municipality
Gladstone	January 1, 2015	Municipality of WestLake – Gladstone
Grandview	January 1, 2015	Grandview Municipality
Gretna	January 1, 2015	Municipality of Rhineland
Hamiota	January 1, 2015	Hamiota Municipality
Hartney	January 1, 2015	Municipality of Grassland
MacGregor	January 1, 2015	Municipality of North Norfolk
Manitou	January 1, 2015	Municipality of Pembina
Minitonas	January 1, 2015	Municipality of Minitonas – Bowsman
Oak Lake	January 1, 2015	Rural Municipality of Sifton
Pilot Mound	January 1, 2015	Municipality of Louise
Plum Coulee	January 1, 2015	Municipality of Rhineland
Rapid City	January 1, 2015	Rural Municipality of Oakview
Rivers	January 1, 2015	Riverdale Municipality
Roblin	January 1, 2015	Municipality of Hillsburg – Roblin – Shell River
Rossburn	January 1, 2015	Rossburn Municipality
Russell	January 1, 2015	Municipality of Russell – Binscarth
Shoal Lake (Note: The former Town of Shoal Lake amalgamated with the former Rural Municipality (RM) of Shoal Lake to form the now-former Municipality of Shoal Lake on January 1, 2011; part of RM of Yellowhead since January 1, 2015.)	January 1, 2011	Rural Municipality of Yellowhead
Souris	January 1, 2015	Municipality of Souris – Glenwood
Sainte Rose du Lac	January 1, 2015	Municipality of Ste. Rose
Treherne	January 1, 2015	Municipality of Norfolk Treherne
Tuxedo (Note: The former Town of Tuxedo and eleven other municipalities were amalgamated with the City of Winnipeg on January 1, 1972.)	January 1, 1972	City of Winnipeg

== See also ==
- List of communities in Manitoba
- List of ghost towns in Manitoba
- List of municipalities in Manitoba
  - List of cities in Manitoba
  - List of rural municipalities in Manitoba
    - List of local urban districts in Manitoba
  - List of villages in Manitoba
- Manitoba municipal amalgamations, 2015
