= Manitoba Highway 22 =

Provincial highway in Manitoba

Provincial Trunk Highway 22
- PTH 22 highlighted in red

Route information
- Maintained by Department of Infrastructure
- Length: 22 km (14 mi)
- Existed: 1960–present

Major junctions
- South end: PTH 23 near Elgin
- North end: PTH 2 / PR 250 in Souris

Location
- Country: Canada
- Province: Manitoba
- Rural municipalities: Grassland; Souris – Glenwood

Highway system
- Provincial highways in Manitoba; Winnipeg City Routes
← PTH 21	→ PTH 23

Provincial Trunk Highway 22 (PTH 22) is a short north–south provincial highway in the Canadian province of Manitoba. It runs from PTH 23 near Elgin to PTH 2 and PR 250 in Souris. This highway is the main access road to the renowned Souris Swinging Bridge.

== Route description ==
PTH 22 begins roughly 1 kilometre (0.6 mi) east of Elgin in the Rural Municipality of Grassland at a junction with PTH 23, with the road continuing south a short distance to Whitewater Recreation Park. The highway heads north through rural farmland for a few kilometres to pass through a switchback, where it has an intersection with PR 347 and crosses into the Rural Municipality of Souris - Glenwood. It winds its way north for a few more kilometres to enter the town of Souris, passing through neighbourhoods as it crosses the Souris River just 200 metres (660 ft) south of the Souris Swinging Bridge. Several side streets connect the swinging bridge to the highway. PTH 22 continues up First Street S through the centre of downtown, coming to an end at an intersection with PTH 2 (First Avenue / Red Coat Trail) and PR 250 (First Street N).

The entire length of Manitoba Highway 22 is a paved, two-lane highway.

== History ==
Originally, Highway 22 was the designation of the route connecting the US border south of Melita to Highway 2 in Pipestone. In 1947, it extended north to Highway 1 in Virden. In 1953, the government re-designated the highway as PTH 83 in order to match U.S. Route 83.

After the original Highway 22 was redesignated as PTH 83, it was moved to a route connecting Highway 1 near Beausejour to Grand Beach, which is now PTH 12 and PTH 59, between 1953 and 1955. The highway was extended to Victoria Beach along what is now PTH 59 in 1956. After the highway was extended, a small stretch of Highway 22 to Grand Beach was redesignated as Highway 22A. The route kept this designation until 1959, when PTH 12 was extended north, replacing Highway 22. As well, the former section of Highway 22A was redesignated as Highway 12G. A small section of the former Highway 22 south of Victoria Beach was redesignated as Highway 12V as Highway 12 turned east to meet Highway 11 at Pine Falls.

PTH 22 was designated to its current route in 1960.

== Major intersections ==
Division	Location	km	mi	Destinations	Notes
Grassland		0.0	0.0	PTH 23 – Elgin, Minto	Southern terminus
Grassland		9.8	6.1	Road 36 N	Former PR 347 south
Souris - Glenwood		10.8	6.7	PR 347 north	Southern terminus of PR 347
Souris - Glenwood	Souris	20.0	12.4	Bridge over the Souris River	
Souris - Glenwood	Souris	22	14	PTH 2 (First Avenue / Red Coat Trail) – Pipestone, Brandon; PR 250 north (First Street N) – Alexander	Northern terminus; southern terminus of PR 250
1.000 mi = 1.609 km; 1.000 km = 0.621 mi

== Related routes ==
Provincial Road 347
- Location: Municipality of Souris-Glenwood
- Length: 21.5 km (13.4 mi)
- Existed: 1966–present

Provincial Road 347 (PR 347) is a spur off of PTH 22 in the Municipality of Souris-Glenwood, serving as a bypass for the town of Souris for those wishing to take PTH 2 (Red Coat Trail) westbound. Signed as a north–south highway, it runs mostly east–west, entirely as a gravel two-lane road, providing access to rural areas within the RM as well as a crossing of the Souris River. PR 347 is 21.5-kilometre-long (13.4 mi).

Provincial Road 454
- Location: Municipality of Souris-Glenwood
- Length: 9.8 km (6.1 mi)
- Existed: 1966–1990

Prior to 1992, PR 347 was a much longer east–west highway, stretching 43.7 kilometres (27.2 mi) from PR 254 just east of Grande-Clairière, through Harney via a concurrency with PTH 21 and a bridge across the Souris River, past former Provincial Road 454 (PR 454), followed its current alignment to have a short concurrency with PTH 22, to its former eastern end at a junction with a former section of PR 348 near Carroll. Now mostly municipally maintained, some sections still belong to the province, including its current alignment and what is now PR 541. During the decommissioning, PR 347 western end was rerouted onto the entire length of former PR 454. The highway remains unchanged since.

Division	Location	km	mi	Destinations	Notes
Souris-Glenwood		0.0	0.0	PTH 22 – Souris, Elgin	Southern terminus
Souris-Glenwood		1.3	0.81	Bridge over Elgin Creek	
Souris-Glenwood		11.7	7.3	Road 36N – Hartney	Former PR 347 west; begins following former PR 454 north
Souris-Glenwood		16.8	10.4	Bridge over the Souris River	
Souris-Glenwood		21.5	13.4	PTH 2 (Red Coat Trail) – Pipestone, Souris	Northern terminus; road continues north as Road 130W
1.000 mi = 1.609 km; 1.000 km = 0.621 mi
