= Manitoba Provincial Road 455 =

Provincial road in Manitoba, Canada

Provincial Road 455

Route information
- Maintained by Department of Infrastructure
- Length: 11.6 km (7.2 mi)
- Existed: 1966–present

Major junctions
- West end: PTH 21 near Sioux Valley Dakota Nation
- East end: PR 250 near Alexander

Location
- Country: Canada
- Province: Manitoba
- Rural municipalities: Whitehead

Highway system
- Provincial highways in Manitoba; Winnipeg City Routes
← PR 453	→ PR 457

Provincial Road 455 (PR 455) is a 11.6-kilometre-long (7.2 mi) provincial road in the Westman Region of the Canadian province of Manitoba. Essentially an east-west spur of PTH 21, it provides access to the town of Alexander.

== Route description ==
Provincial Road 455 is an east–west route and runs from PR 250 near Alexander to its terminus at PTH 21 just east of the Sioux Valley Dakota Nation along the banks of the Assiniboine River.

PR 455 is a gravel road for its entire length, and runs entirely within the Rural Municipality of Whitehead. The speed limit along this road is 80 kilometres per hour (50 mph).

== History ==
Prior to 1949, PR 455 was part of the original Highway 1. The route was given its current designation when the Manitoba government implemented its secondary highway system in 1966.

== Major intersections ==
Division	Location	km	mi	Destinations	Notes
Whitehead		0.0	0.0	PTH 21 – Griswold, Hamiota	Western terminus
Whitehead		0.0	0.0	PR 250 to PTH 1 (TCH) – Rivers, Alexander	Eastern terminus; road continues east as McTaggart Road (Road 57N)
1.000 mi = 1.609 km; 1.000 km = 0.621 mi
