= Manitoba Provincial Road 349 =

Provincial road in Manitoba, Canada

Provincial Road 349
- PR 349 highlighted in red

Route information
- Maintained by Department of Infrastructure
- Length: 22.2 km (13.8 mi)
- Existed: 1966–present

Major junctions
- East end: PTH 10 near Brandon
- West end: PR 250 near Beresford

Location
- Country: Canada
- Province: Manitoba
- Rural municipalities: Cornwallis; Whitehead

Highway system
- Provincial highways in Manitoba; Winnipeg City Routes
| ← PR 348 | → PR 350 |

Provincial Road 349 (PR 349) is a 22.2-kilometre-long (13.8 mi) east-west highway in the Westman Region of the Canadian province of Manitoba.

== Route description ==
The route begins at PR 250 and terminates at PTH 10 south of Brandon. PR 349 meets southbound PR 348 approximately 15 kilometres (9.3 mi) west of its eastbound terminus.

PR 349 is a straight gravel road for its entire length.

== History ==
In the early 1990s, the Manitoba government decommissioned a number of provincial secondary roads and returned the maintenance of these roads back to the rural municipalities. A section of the original PR 349 was included in this decommissioning.

Prior to this, PR 349 extended past its westbound terminus for 14 kilometres (8.7 mi) before terminating at PTH 21 south of Griswold.

After the decommissioning of this section, the road is known as Municipal Road Mile 50N.

The original length of PR 349 was 36 kilometres (22 mi).

== Major intersections ==
| Division | Location | km | mi | Destinations | Notes |
|---|---|---|---|---|---|
| Whitehead | | 0.0 | 0.0 | PR 250 – Souris, Alexander; Mile 50N – Griswold | Western terminus; road continues west as Mile 50N (former PR 349 west) |
| Whitehead | | 4.9 | 3.0 | Road 120W – Beresford | |
| Whitehead / Cornwallis boundary | | 14.8 | 9.2 | PR 348 south – Carroll | Northern terminus of PR 348 |
| Cornwallis | | 22.2 | 13.8 | PTH 10 (John Bracken Highway) – Brandon, Boissevain | Eastern terminus; road continues east as High Country Road |
1.000 mi = 1.609 km; 1.000 km = 0.621 mi
