= Hamiota =

Hamiota may refer to:

- Hamiota Municipality, a rural municipality in Manitoba, Canada, formed by amalgamating:
  - Hamiota, Manitoba, a former town
  - Rural Municipality of Hamiota, a former rural municipality
- Hamiota (bivalve), a genus of molluscs
