= Manitoba Provincial Road 348 =

Provincial road in Manitoba, Canada

Provincial Road 348
- Road 114W
- PR 348 highlighted in red

Route information
- Maintained by Department of Infrastructure
- Length: 13.1 km (8.1 mi)
- Existed: 1966–present

Major junctions
- South end: PTH 2 near Carroll
- North end: PR 349 near Brandon

Location
- Country: Canada
- Province: Manitoba
- Rural municipalities: Cornwallis; Oakland – Wawanesa; Souris – Glenwood; Whitehead

Highway system
- Provincial highways in Manitoba; Winnipeg City Routes
← PR 347	→ PR 349

Provincial Road 348 (PR 348) is a 13.1-kilometre-long (8.1 mi) north-south provincial road in the Westman Region of the Canadian province of Manitoba. It provides a connection between PTH 2 (Red Coat Trail) just west of the hamlet of Carroll and PR 349 (High Country Road) a few kilometers outside of the city of Brandon. It is entirely a two-lane gravel road, with no other communities or major intersections along its length as it travels through flat farmland, though it does include a bridge over a small creek.

== History ==
Today, PR 348 is a shadow of its former self, previously stretching for 72.0 kilometres (44.7 mi) from Boissevain at PTH 10 (John Bracken Highway) to its current northern end at PR 349, via running along the northern side of Whitewater Lake, a portion of what is now PR 448, a concurrency with PR 343 eastbound, passing through Fairfax along what is now PR 444, crossing PTH 23, crossing the Souris River at Bunclody, before joining its current alignment after a junction with PTH 2 (Red Coat Trail). In 1990, the portion south of PR 343 was dropped, being replaced with an extended PR 448. In 1992, the highway was further reduced to its current length.

== Major intersections ==
Division	Location	km	mi	Destinations	Notes
Souris-Glenwood / Oakland-Wawanesa boundary		0.0	0.0	PTH 2 (Red Coat Trail) – Souris, Brandon	Southern terminus; road continues south as Road 114W
Whitehead / Cornwallis boundary		13.1	8.1	PR 349 (High Country Road) – Beresford, Brandon	Northern terminus; road continues north as Road 114W
1.000 mi = 1.609 km; 1.000 km = 0.621 mi
