= Rural Municipality of Daly =

Daly
- Former rural municipality
- Location within Manitoba
- Coordinates: 49°58′00″N 100°15′18″W
- Country: Canada
- Province: Manitoba
- Rural municipality: Riverdale Municipality
- Founded: 1883
- Dissolved: 2015

Area
  - Land: 562.45 km^{2} (217.16 sq mi)

Population (2016)
  - Total: 808
  - Density: 1.4/km^{2} (3.6/sq mi)
- Time zone: UTC-6 (Central Time Zone)
  - Summer (DST): UTC-5 (Central Time Zone)
- Area codes: 204, 431

The Rural Municipality of Daly is a former rural municipality (RM) in the Canadian province of Manitoba. It was originally incorporated as a rural municipality on December 22, 1883. It ceased on January 1, 2015 as a result of its provincially mandated amalgamation with the Town of Rivers to form the Riverdale Municipality.

The RM was located northwest of the City of Brandon and encompassed 553 square kilometres of prime agricultural land. It was named for Thomas Mayne Daly, a prominent Manitoba lawyer and politician.

== Communities ==
- Bradwardine
- Levine
- Myra
- Wheatland

== Demographics ==
Historical census populations – Daly, Manitoba
Year	Pop.	±%
1986	877	—
1991	880	+0.3%
1996	895	+1.7%
2001	906	+1.2%
2006	868	−4.2%
2011	830	−4.4%
2016	808	−2.7%
Population amount of 2016 is for Daly (Dissolved census subdivision). Source:
