= Rural Municipality of Cameron =

Rural municipality in Manitoba, Canada

Coordinates: 49°26′37″N 100°34′43″W

The Rural Municipality of Cameron is a former rural municipality (RM) in the Canadian province of Manitoba. It was originally incorporated as a rural municipality on November 16, 1896. It ceased on January 1, 2015, as a result of its provincially mandated amalgamation with the RM of Whitewater and the Town of Hartney to form the Municipality of Grassland.

The RM was located southwest of Brandon and was home to about 500 people. It was named for John Donald Cameron, the Attorney General of Manitoba at the time.

== Communities ==
Former towns: (previously independently administered)

- Hartney

Unincorporated communities:

- Argue
- Grande Clairière
- Lauder
- Underhill

== Attractions ==
- Fort Desjarlais
- Fort Ash
- Fort Grand
- Hart-Cam Museum
- Lauder Sandhills
