= Bradwardine =

Bradwardine can refer to the following:

- Thomas Bradwardine, English archbishop.
- The Baron of Bradwardine, a character from the novel Waverley by Sir Walter Scott. His only child is his daughter, Rose Bradwardine.
- The former village of Bradwardine, Manitoba, Canada.
