= Roseland, Manitoba =

Rural district in Canada

Roseland
- Location of Roseland in Manitoba
- Coordinates: 49°47′53″N 100°04′32″W
- Country: Canada
- Province: Manitoba
- Region: Westman
- Census Division: No. 7

Government
  - Governing Body: RM of Whitehead
  - MP: Grant Jackson
  - MLA: Wayne Balcaen
- Area code: 204
- GNBC Code: GBACH

Roseland, Manitoba is an historical district located in the Canadian province of Manitoba. It is located just west of Manitoba Provincial Highway 10, in the Rural Municipalities of Whitehead and Cornwallis.

== History ==
European settlers had been settling in the area for years before, but it wasn't until 1883 that Roseland gained its first community building with the creation of the Roseland United Church. The first communion service at the new church was held August 13, 1883, with Dr. Pringle presiding. On January 6, 1971, after 88 years of service to the community, the Roseland Church was disbanded. A carin now stands at the location of the church, honouring the memory of the pioneers who settled the district. A school was built in 1884, originally sitting at NE35-9-20W, before being replaced with a new building at SE1-10-20 in 1886. The new Roseland school was demolished in 1948 and replaced with a new structure that still stands. Roseland school was in operation until 1968, when it had its last class. Currently the structure serves as a community centre. The Roseland curling rink was built in 1948. It has served as the home of the Roseland Curling Bonspeil every year since.

== Roseland Today ==
Present Day, Roseland is an agricultural community, growing crops such as corn, wheat, barley, soybeans, canola, flax and oats. Roseland also has a number of livestock producers, specializing in cattle, chicken and sheep. Activities in Roseland include Roseland Bonspeil, the Talegate Cookoff, the Roseland Pancake Breakfast and the Community Supper.
