= Grande-Clairière =

- Location of Grande-Clairière in Manitoba
- Coordinates: 49°30′18″N 100°42′11″W
- Country: Canada
- Province: Manitoba
- Region: Westman Region
- Census Division: No. 5

Government
  - Governing Body: Municipality of Grassland
  - MP: Grant Jackson
  - MLA: Doyle Piwniuk
- Time zone: UTC−6 (CST)
  - Summer (DST): UTC−5 (CDT)
- Area code: 204
- NTS Map: 062F10
- GNBC Code: GAJQA

Grande-Clairière is a locality in southwestern Manitoba, Canada. It is located approximately 13 kilometres (8 miles) northwest of Hartney, Manitoba in the Municipality of Grassland, formerly the Rural Municipality of Cameron. It was founded by French and Belgian settlers in 1890.
