= Alice Masak French =

Inuk author (1930–2013)

Alice Masak French (June 29, 1930 – July 5, 2013) was an Inuk author who lived in Souris, Manitoba, Canada. An Inuvialuk, she was born at Baillie Island in the Northwest Territories. Her work focuses on the experiences of Inuit women, and discusses the struggle to hold on to Native tradition. Her My Name is Masak (1976; translated into French as Je m'appelle Masak, 1979) is an autobiographical story about her youth in a boarding school, while The Restless Nomad (1992) continues the story up until she moves to Ireland. She later returned to Canada and settled in Medicine Hat, Alberta.

== Sources ==
- Biography of Alice Masak French on Inuit.uqam.ca.
- Kratzert, M. "Native American Literature: Expanding the Canon", Collection Building Vol. 17, 1, 1998, p. 4
- Watson, C. "Autobiographical Writing as a Healing Process: Interview with Alice Masak French. Canadian Literature/Litterature canadienne, Number 167, Winter 2006, 32-44.
