= Rural Municipality of Hamiota =

Former rural municipality in Manitoba, Canada

Coordinates: 50°11′47″N 100°38′03″W

The Rural Municipality of Hamiota is a former rural municipality (RM) in the Canadian province of Manitoba. It was originally incorporated as a rural municipality on June 28, 1895. It ceased on January 1, 2015 as a result of its provincially mandated amalgamation with the Town of Hamiota to form the Hamiota Municipality.

== Communities ==
- Decker
- Lavinia
- McConnell
- Oakner
- Pope
