= Griswold, Manitoba =

Griswold
- Location of Griswold in Manitoba
- Coordinates: 49°46′30″N 100°28′15″W
- Country: Canada
- Province: Manitoba
- Region: Westman
- Census Division: No. 6

Government
  - Governing Body: Rural Municipality of Sifton Council
  - MP: Grant Jackson
  - MLA: Colleen Robbins
- Time zone: UTC−6 (CST)
  - Summer (DST): UTC−5 (CDT)
- Postal Code: R0M 0S0
- Area codes: 204, 431
- NTS Map: 062F16
- GNBC Code: GAJXS

Griswold is an unincorporated place located within the Rural Municipality of Sifton in south-western Manitoba, Canada. It is located approximately 38 kilometers (24 miles) southwest of Brandon, Manitoba. Griswold is home to the Alex-Gris Doerksen property, a prairie marsh wetland known for bird watching and canoeing.
