= Municipality of Souris-Glenwood =

Rural municipality in Manitoba, Canada

Souris-Glenwood
- Rural municipality
- Municipality of Souris-Glenwood
- Location of the RM of Souris-Glenwood in Manitoba
- Coordinates: 49°37′17″N 100°15′28″W
- Country: Canada
- Province: Manitoba
- Region: Westman
- Incorporated (amalgamated): January 1, 2015

Government
  - Mayor: Duane Davison
  - CAO: Pamela Pannagl (Interim)
  - MLA: Colleen Robbins
  - MP: Grant Jackson (CPC)

Area (2021)
  - Land: 579.69 km^{2} (223.82 sq mi)
  - Population centre: 2.5 km^{2} (0.97 sq mi)
  - Designated place (Souris): 3.35 km^{2} (1.29 sq mi)
- Elevation (at weather station): 432.8 m (1,420 ft)

Population (2021)
  - Total: 2,547
  - Density: 4.4/km^{2} (11/sq mi)
  - Population centre: 1,935
  - Population centre density: 772.6/km^{2} (2,001/sq mi)
  - Designated place: 1,970
  - Designated place density: 588.7/km^{2} (1,525/sq mi)
- Time zone: UTC−06:00 (CST)
  - Summer (DST): UTC−05:00 (CDT)
- Postal code: R0K 2C0
- Area code: 204
- Website: www.sourismanitoba.com

The Municipality of Souris-Glenwood is a rural municipality (RM) in the Canadian province of Manitoba.

The Manitoban rural municipality was incorporated on January 1, 2015, via the amalgamation of the RM of Glenwood and the town of Souris. It was formed as a requirement of The Municipal Amalgamations Act, which made it compulsory that municipalities with a population less than 1,000 amalgamate with one or more neighbouring municipalities by 2015. The Government of Manitoba initiated these amalgamations in order for municipalities to meet the 1997 minimum population requirement of 1,000 to incorporate a municipality.

== History ==
The area was first explored by Europeans when La Vérendrye arrived in 1738, when it seems he initially mistook the Souris River for the Missouri River. The area of the townsite was later explored by David Thompson in 1797-98 and Alexander Henry the younger in 1805. Detailed accounts of life on the Souris plains in the early 1800s were diarized in detail by a Captain John Rogers. His diaries remain saved with the Government of Manitoba's Archive Division today. Rogers was later killed in the Battle of Seven Oaks, ending his exploration of the area. In the years after, considerable fur trade continued in the area, documented by Peter Garrioch in 1843-44. Buffalo still roamed these plains in the early 1800s before the herds were killed out.

From the mid-century to the late 1800s, only the Assiniboine roamed these areas. The first permanent settlers to the area arrived in 1880 when Captain Gilbert Wood, his wife, and two children came to the area. They travelled to Winnipeg by way of Chicago, from there they took a buckboard wagon west, pulled by oxen while a steamship carried their goods up the Assiniboine River. Captain Wood had heard of a man named Lang who told him the land at Plum Creek and the Souris River was a beautiful place to settle. Wood, curious by this notion, hired a guide by the name of Bangs and they set out to see the area for themselves. This resulted in a 3-4 day round trip from their camp at Millford which is on the south bank of the Assiniboine at Treesbank. When they returned his wife asked him what he thought of the area, to which he replied that it was a beautiful district, the best he had seen in all their journeys. To this Mrs. Wood replied "Then take me to Plum Creek."

They would arrive to the area on August 28, 1880. While setting up a homestead there they encountered a man, Squire Sowden from Millbrook, Ontario. Sowden was shocked to find a woman and children in what was then the middle of nowhere. The Woods would build a shanty on the shores of Plum Creek that would serve as a landing place for many new settlers to the area. Mrs. Wood later recounted a time when as many as 21 people were sleeping in their 3.7 m × 4.9 m (12 ft × 16 ft) sod shanty. Captain Wood lived until 1903 while Mrs. Wood died in 1928.

The first large settlement was led by Squire Sowden. In 1880 he was appointed head of a Colonization Syndicate in Millbrook by a group of businessmen looking to settle the area. He explored the area of Plum Creek at Souris, adventuring as far west as today's Gainsborough, Saskatchewan. This is the time when Squire met the Woods, while exploring the area in early fall 1880. The sites were good and he selected several surveyed townships for their future settlement. Sowden and the businessmen sent a proposal to Ottawa which was accepted and the venture was begun. Sowden and the men arranged for land to be purchased at $3.00 an acre and each settler paid $25.00 for a receipt which was to be presented at the Land Office at the mouth of the Souris River when they completed their registration. The settlers travelled from Ontario to Detroit by train, then travelling from there to Chicago, next to Saint Paul, Minnesota, before eventually reaching Saint Boniface, Manitoba. Here they would travel the rough roads west by cart and storing their heavier goods until they could be shipped to the mouth of the Souris River when navigable. When the settlers reached the land at last, they saw the land was good and set to work establishing their homesteads.

The first building in the town was erected in 1881. The next few years saw the townsite continue to grow as more and more settlers reached the area. Many of the settlers returned home the first winter in 1881 to Ontario, but the following year they returned with more goods, and many more settlers followed them. The town grew at an exceptional rate in 1882. Many of the settlers were now arriving at the town from Brandon via the Canadian Pacific Railway rather than the Boundary Commission Trail located to the south. Many of the settlers were coming from the "old countries" of the United Kingdom and particularly from Ireland.

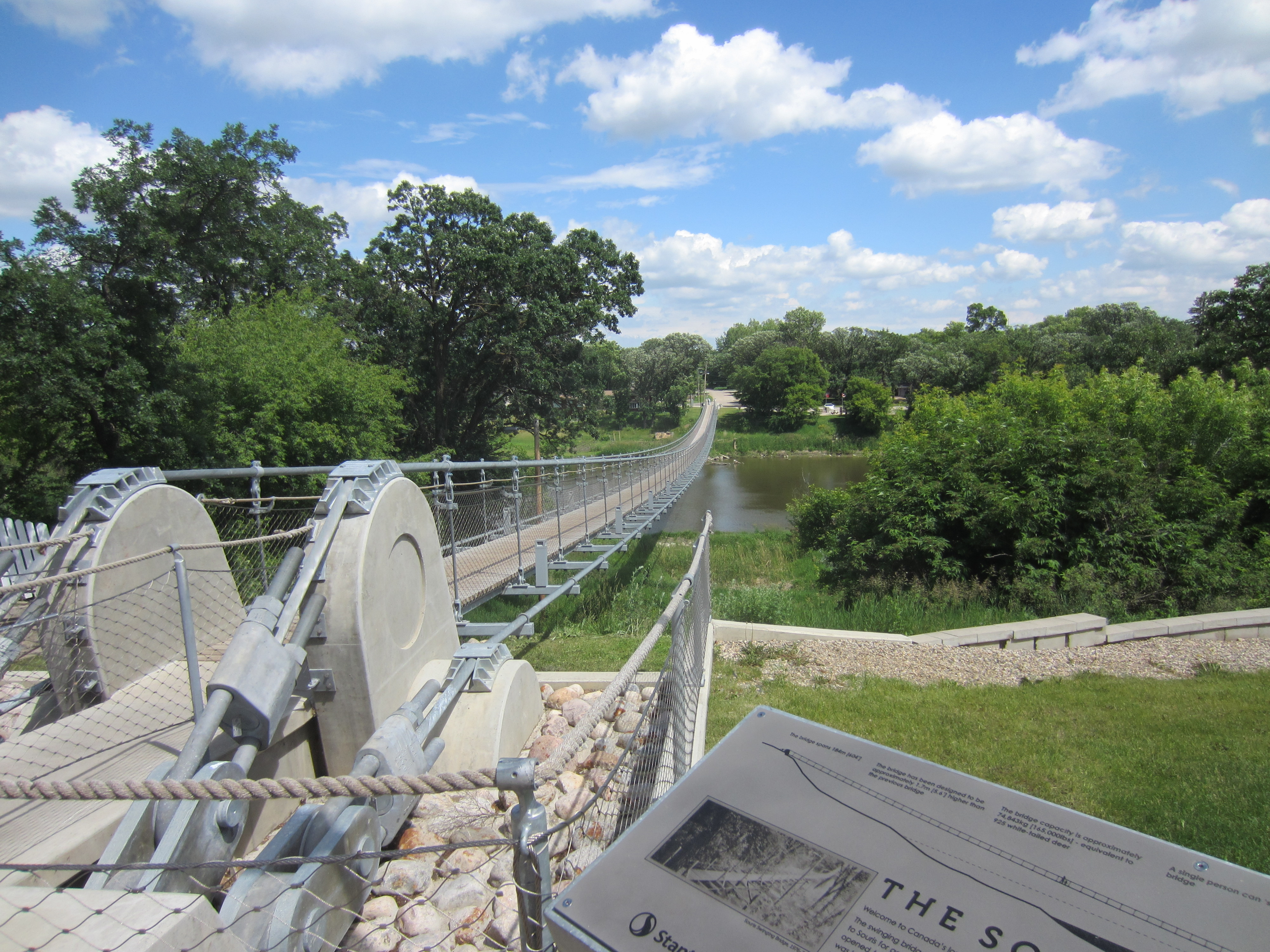
Swinging bridge over the Souris River at Souris, Manitoba.

Sowden had originally chosen the Plum Creek site because he wanted to build a mill there and this he completed in those early years. The mill was successful and despite drought years in that decade, the products of the mill became quite popular in the area and country. As the grain became popular, local farmers would have to bring their wheat to Brandon or Alexander as there was no rail service in Souris. Beginning in 1890 negotiations were made with the Canadian Pacific Railway (CPR) to bring the railway to the town and in 1892 the Glenboro Line was completed to the town. This brought further and increased growth to the community as many towns of the era hitched their prosperity to the railway. Before the turn of the century five grain elevators stood alongside the railway. In 1902 a brickyard was established in the community, it only operated for a few short years, but 40 of the town's major brick commercial and residential buildings were built by these bricks. Many of these buildings are still standing today. As a result of this exceptional growth, the community was incorporated as a town in 1904 as the population neared a thousand people.

== Geography ==
It is located at the conjunction of Plum Creek and the Souris River on the Canadian Prairies. A dam lies at the east of town on the Souris River in order to maintain recreational usage water levels. In the past the dam was meant to keep waters high enough for operation of the flour mill. With Souris residing in Palliser's Triangle the region can be prone to regular and lengthy droughts. The city of Brandon is located 30 km (19 mi) to the northeast. Souris lies between the Brandon Hills located to the northeast and the Turtle Mountain Plateau located approximately 80 km (50 mi) south of the town. Whitewater Lake, an endorheic basin lies between the Turtle Mountains and the town.

Climate data for Souris Climate ID: 5012719; coordinates 49°39′N 100°15′W; elevation: 432.8 m (1,420 ft); 1991–2020 normals, extremes 1982−2006
Month	Jan	Feb	Mar	Apr	May	Jun	Jul	Aug	Sep	Oct	Nov	Dec	Year
Record high °C (°F)	8.0 (46.4)	16.0 (60.8)	17.5 (63.5)	30.0 (86.0)	34.5 (94.1)	36.0 (96.8)	35.0 (95.0)	39.0 (102.2)	36.0 (96.8)	31.5 (88.7)	20.0 (68.0)	9.0 (48.2)	39.0 (102.2)
Mean daily maximum °C (°F)	−10.3 (13.5)	−7.1 (19.2)	−0.3 (31.5)	10.8 (51.4)	18.4 (65.1)	22.8 (73.0)	25.5 (77.9)	25.5 (77.9)	19.2 (66.6)	10.9 (51.6)	−0.8 (30.6)	−8.2 (17.2)	8.9 (48.0)
Daily mean °C (°F)	−16 (3)	−13 (9)	−5.8 (21.6)	4.2 (39.6)	11.1 (52.0)	16.3 (61.3)	18.6 (65.5)	18.0 (64.4)	12.0 (53.6)	4.4 (39.9)	−5.9 (21.4)	−13.7 (7.3)	2.5 (36.5)
Mean daily minimum °C (°F)	−21.6 (−6.9)	−18.8 (−1.8)	−11.3 (11.7)	−2.4 (27.7)	3.8 (38.8)	9.7 (49.5)	11.7 (53.1)	10.4 (50.7)	4.7 (40.5)	−2.2 (28.0)	−10.8 (12.6)	−19.1 (−2.4)	−3.8 (25.2)
Record low °C (°F)	−45 (−49)	−42.5 (−44.5)	−40 (−40)	−22.5 (−8.5)	−12.5 (9.5)	−3 (27)	0.0 (32.0)	−3.5 (25.7)	−8 (18)	−25 (−13)	−34 (−29)	−43 (−45)	−45 (−49)
Average precipitation mm (inches)	23.5 (0.93)	17.5 (0.69)	26.1 (1.03)	27.5 (1.08)	64.9 (2.56)	92.1 (3.63)	72.6 (2.86)	54.5 (2.15)	41.6 (1.64)	35.2 (1.39)	24.7 (0.97)	28.5 (1.12)	508.8 (20.03)
Average rainfall mm (inches)	0.6 (0.02)	1.3 (0.05)	7.7 (0.30)	16.6 (0.65)	57.2 (2.25)	92.1 (3.63)	72.6 (2.86)	54.5 (2.15)	41.3 (1.63)	26.5 (1.04)	6.2 (0.24)	0.8 (0.03)	377.4 (14.86)
Average snowfall cm (inches)	23.0 (9.1)	16.2 (6.4)	18.3 (7.2)	10.8 (4.3)	5.6 (2.2)	0.0 (0.0)	0.0 (0.0)	0.0 (0.0)	0.3 (0.1)	8.6 (3.4)	18.5 (7.3)	27.7 (10.9)	129.0 (50.8)
Average precipitation days (≥ 0.2 mm)	7.3	4.7	5.9	6.2	10.2	12.7	10.4	9.2	8.7	8.1	5.6	7.6	96.5
Average rainy days (≥ 0.2 mm)	0.22	0.27	1.6	4.3	9.8	12.7	10.4	9.2	8.6	6.7	1.4	0.55	65.7
Average snowy days (≥ 0.2 cm)	7.2	4.5	4.6	2.5	0.8	0.0	0.0	0.0	0.1	1.8	4.6	7.0	33.1
Source: Environment and Climate Change Canada

== Demographics ==
In the 2021 Canadian census conducted by Statistics Canada, Souris-Glenwood had a population of 2,547 living in 1,028 of its 1,128 total private dwellings, a change of −0.6% from its 2016 population of 2,562. With a land area of 579.69 km^{2} (223.82 sq mi), it had a population density of 4.4/km^{2} (11.4/sq mi) in 2021.

== Attractions ==
The Souris Sand Hills (49°39′34″N 100°21′43″W) are located west of Souris and north of Plum Creek on the western side of the municipality of Souris – Glenwood. The sand hills are glacial deposits left from glacial lakes and deltas from the last ice age.
