= Riverdale Municipality =

Rural municipality in Manitoba, Canada

Riverdale
- Rural municipality
- Riverdale Municipality
- Location of the Municipality of Riverdale in Manitoba
- Coordinates: 49°58′30″N 100°16′44″W
- Country: Canada
- Province: Manitoba
- Region: Westman
- Incorporated: January 1, 2015

Government
  - Mayor: Todd Gill

Area
  - Land: 576.02 km^{2} (222.40 sq mi)

Population (2021)
  - Total: 1,803
  - Density: 3.7/km^{2} (9.6/sq mi)
- Time zone: UTC-6 (CST)
  - Summer (DST): UTC-5 (CDT)
- Website: riversdaly.ca

Riverdale Municipality is a rural municipality (RM) in the Canadian province of Manitoba.

== History ==
The RM was incorporated on January 1, 2015 via the amalgamation of the RM of Daly and the Town of Rivers. It was formed as a requirement of The Municipal Amalgamations Act, which required that municipalities with a population less than 1,000 amalgamate with one or more neighbouring municipalities by 2015. The Government of Manitoba initiated these amalgamations in order for municipalities to meet the 1997 minimum population requirement of 1,000 to incorporate a municipality.

== Communities ==
- Bradwardine
- Rivers
- Wheatland

== Demographics ==
Canada census – Riverdale, Manitoba community profile

	2021	2016
Population	1,803 (-15.5% from 2016)	2,133 (5.6% from 2011)
Land area	576.02 km^{2} (222.40 sq mi)	571.16 km^{2} (220.53 sq mi)
Population density	3.1/km^{2} (8.0/sq mi)	3.7/km^{2} (9.6/sq mi)
Median age	40 (M: 40, F: 39.6)	39.9 (M: 39.4, F: 40.5)
Private dwellings	710 (total)	920 (total)
Median household income		$63,061

References: 2021 2016

Historical census populations - Riverdale

Year	Pop.	±%
1986	2,034	—
1991	1,956	−3.8%
1996	2,012	+2.9%
2001	2,025	+0.6%

Year	Pop.	±%
2006	2,061	+1.8%
2011	2,019	−2.0%
2016	2,133	+5.6%
2021	1,803	−15.5%

Population amounts prior to 2015 are total of Rivers (town) and Daly (rural municipality).
Source: Statistics Canada

In the 2021 Census of Population conducted by Statistics Canada, Riverdale had a population of 1,803 living in 714 of its 788 total private dwellings, a change of −15.5% from its 2016 population of 2,133. With a land area of 576.02 km^{2} (222.40 sq mi), it had a population density of 3.1/km^{2} (8.1/sq mi) in 2021.
