= Bradwardine, Manitoba =

Bradwardine
- Location of Bradwardine in Manitoba
- Coordinates: 49°59′44″N 100°27′49″W
- Country: Canada
- Province: Manitoba
- Region: Westman
- Census Division: No. 7

Government
  - Governing Body: Riverdale Municipality
  - MP: Grant Jackson
  - MLA: Colleen Robbins
- Time zone: UTC−6 (CST)
  - Summer (DST): UTC−5 (CDT)
- Postal Code: R0M 0E0
- Area codes: 204, 431
- NTS Map: 062F16
- GNBC Code: GADMQ

Bradwardine is a historical location northeast of Virden, Manitoba, in Riverdale Municipality.

The Post Office was founded on 12-12-23W in 1884 and moved to 7-12-22W when the railway arrived about 1902. The name of Rowan was proposed by the first postmaster, John Parr. Ottawa opted for a character from the novel Waverley by Sir Walter Scott, the Baron of Bradwardine.

Once a thriving village, Bradwardine disappeared after the Second World War. It had suffered losses from two fires in the early 1900s. The railway and the school were both lost after the war.
