= Kenton, Manitoba =

Unincorporated community in Manitoba, Canada

Coordinates: 49°59′15″N 100°36′51″W

Kenton is an unincorporated community recognized as a local urban district in Manitoba, Canada. It is located in the Rural Municipality of Woodworth, about an hour's drive west of Brandon. The first permanent settlement of the area began in 1881, following the westward expansion of the borders of the province of Manitoba. The settlement was named for its first postmaster, A.W. Kent. Kenton became an unincorporated village district in 1947. In 1986, the community had a population of 158. Water supply for the community is from the nearby half-mile long Kenton Reservoir on Bars Creek, a tributary of the Oak River. The 600 acre foot reservoir was constructed in 1969 by the Prairie Farm Rehabilitation Administration and also provides an opportunity for sport fishing. Kenton is the location of the municipal council chamber for the RM of Woodworth.

== Services ==
Kenton features a full service campground and swimming area, walking trail, hockey rink, curling rink, grocery store, restaurant, vehicle dealership, Royal Canadian Legion hall, community hall, gas station, liquor store, lumber yard, and fibre optic internet.

A railway branch line connected Kenton in 1902. The local lighting plant was replaced with a connection to the provincial electric power grid in 1931. The Rural Municipality of Woodworth ran its own municipal telephone system from 1907 with the main exchange at Kenton, until the system was sold to the provincial telephone company in 1946.
