= Rivers, Manitoba =

Unincorporated community in Canada

Rivers
- Unincorporated community
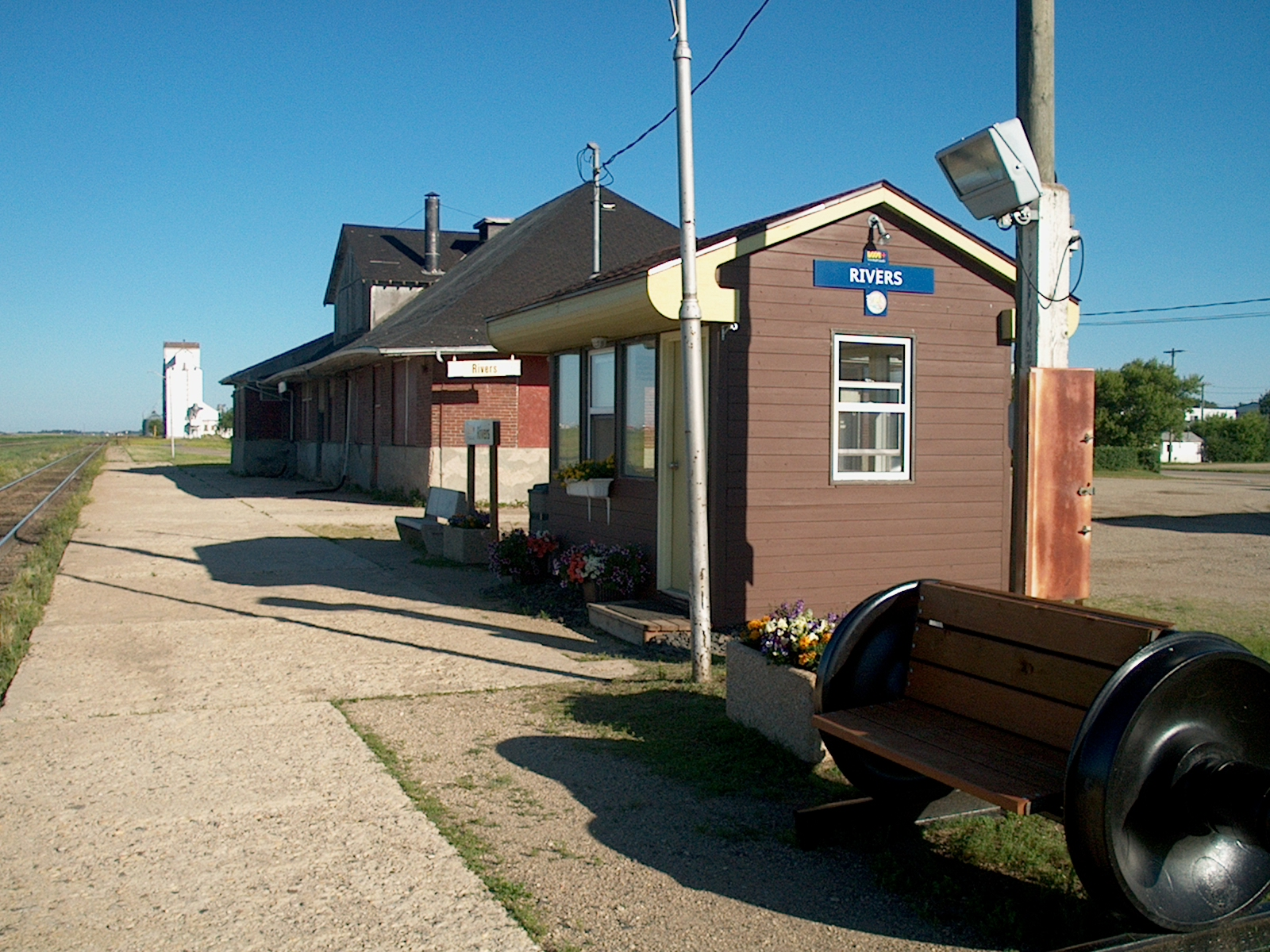
- Rivers Train Station

- Location within Manitoba
- Coordinates: 50°01′51″N 100°14′20″W
- Country: Canada
- Province: Manitoba
- Region: Westman Region
- Census division: No. 7
- Rural municipality: Riverdale Municipality
- Founded: 1908
- Amalgamated: 2015
- Named for: Charles Rivers Wilson

Government
  - Type: Unincorporated
  - Federal riding: Dauphin—Swan River—Neepawa
  - Provincial riding: Spruce Woods

Area
  - Land: 7.98 km^{2} (3.08 sq mi)
- Elevation: 473 m (1,552 ft)

Population (2021)
  - Total: 971
  - Density: 122/km^{2} (315/sq mi)
- Time zone: UTC-06:00 (CST)
  - Summer (DST): UTC-05:00 (CDT)
- Postal code: R0K 1X0
- Area codes: 204, 431
- Provincial Trunk Highways: PTH 25
- Provincial Roads: PR 250

Rivers is an unincorporated urban community in the Riverdale Municipality within the Canadian province of Manitoba. It is located 40 kilometres (25 mi) northwest of Brandon, 473 metres (1,552 ft) above sea level. It is within the Westman Region (Southwestern Manitoba). Agriculture, health and related businesses provide income for the community and area. Rivers has a population of 1,257 people in the 2016 census.

== History ==
Rivers was named in 1908 after Sir Charles Rivers Wilson, Chairman of the Board of the Grand Trunk Pacific Railway.

During the Second World War, Rivers became one of the sites in Canada which helped to fix the positions of German U-boats using high-frequency direction finding. This site, along with Portage la Prairie increased the "fix" accuracy on the U-boats.

Rivers held town status prior to January 1, 2015. It was dissolved on that day as a result of its provincially mandated amalgamation with the Rural Municipality of Daly to form Riverdale Municipality.

== Demographics ==
Historical census populations - Rivers, Manitoba
Year	Pop.	±%
1986	1,157	—
1991	1,076	−7.0%
1996	1,117	+3.8%
2001	1,119	+0.2%
2006	1,193	+6.6%
2011	1,189	−0.3%
2016	1,325	+11.4%
2021	971	−26.7%
Population amount after 2015 is for Rivers (Dissolved census subdivision), before 2015 for Rivers (Town); Source: Statistics Canada

In the 2021 Census of Population conducted by Statistics Canada, Rivers had a population of 971 living in 401 of its 428 total private dwellings, a change of −26.7% from its 2016 population of 1,325. With a land area of 7.98 km^{2} (3.08 sq mi), it had a population density of 121.7/km^{2} (315.1/sq mi) in 2021.

Canada census – Rivers, Manitoba (Population centre in 2016; Town in 2011) community profile

	2016	2011
Population	1,257 (9.4% from 2011)	1,189 (-0.3% from 2006)
Land area	0.86 km^{2} (0.33 sq mi)	7.97 km^{2} (3.08 sq mi)
Population density	1,454.7/km^{2} (3,768/sq mi)	149.3/km^{2} (387/sq mi)
Median age	35.0 (M: 33.8, F: 37.3)	40.2 (M: 38.8, F: 41.4)
Private dwellings	540 (total)	526 (total)
Median household income	$55,168	$44,239

References: 2016 2011

== Attractions ==
East of Rivers is Lake Wahtopanah, a 6-mile (9.7 km) long lake that is part of Rivers Provincial Park.

== Infrastructure ==
CFB Rivers, a former military base, is located 4 miles (6.4 km) west of the community. It was decommissioned in 1971.

Rivers is served by Provincial Trunk Highway 25 (PTH 25) and Provincial Road 250 (PR 250). PTH 25 terminates just southwest of Rivers at the unincorporated community of Wheatland, while PR 250 intersects and briefly overlaps with PTH 25.

Rivers station is a station stop for Via Rail's The Canadian.

== Education ==
The local schools fall under the Rolling River School Division, with a nursery school, the Rivers Elementary School (kindergarten to grade 6), and Rivers Collegiate Institute (grades 7 to 12). The high school is a "Pay It Forward" school and works on programs to do just that.

== In media ==
In The Railrodder, Buster Keaton passes through Rivers. The first chapter of the 2022 Keaton biography Buster Keaton: A Filmmaker's Life. is titled "Rivers, Manitoba".

== Notable people ==
- Earl Dawson (1925–1987), politician and president of the Manitoba and Canadian Amateur Hockey Associations
