= Municipality of Grassland =

Rural municipality in Manitoba, Canada

Grassland
- Rural municipality
- Municipality of Grassland
- Location of the Municipality of Grassland in Manitoba
- Coordinates: 49.431°N 100.310°W
- Country: Canada
- Province: Manitoba
- Region: Westman
- Incorporated (amalgamated): January 1, 2015

Area
  - Total: 1,350.34 km^{2} (521.37 sq mi)

Population (2021)
  - Total: 1,583
  - Density: 1.172/km^{2} (3.036/sq mi)
- Time zone: UTC-6 (CST)
  - Summer (DST): UTC-5 (CDT)
- Website: grasslandmunicipality.ca

The Municipality of Grassland is a rural municipality (RM) in the Canadian province of Manitoba.

== History ==
The RM was incorporated on January 1, 2015 via the amalgamation of the RMs of Cameron and Whitewater and the town of Hartney. It was formed as a requirement of The Municipal Amalgamations Act, which required that municipalities with a population less than 1,000 amalgamate with one or more neighbouring municipalities by 2015. The Government of Manitoba initiated these amalgamations in order for municipalities to meet the 1997 minimum population requirement of 1,000 to incorporate a municipality.

== Communities ==
- Elgin
- Hartney
- Grande-Clairière
- Lauder
- Minto

== Demographics ==
In the 2021 Census of Population conducted by Statistics Canada, Grassland had a population of 1,583 living in 552 of its 617 total private dwellings, a change of 1.4% from its 2016 population of 1,561. With a land area of 1,350.34 km^{2} (521.37 sq mi), it had a population density of 1.2/km^{2} (3.0/sq mi) in 2021.

== Lauder Sand Hills ==
The Lauder Sand Hills (49°29′0″N, 100°39′56″W) are located 6 kilometres west of Hartney, were created between 10,000 and 8,000 years ago when the glaciers from the last ice age receded to the north. The glaciers left huge lakes in their wake and the lake that was responsible for the sand hills was named Glacial Lake Hind. The sand hills were formed by sand deposits left behind by a river delta going into the lake. When the lake eventually drained away, the Lauder Sand Hills were left behind. In 1971, the Lauder Sandhills Wildlife Management Area was established to protect the winter habitat of the white-tailed deer. The management area covers 3,145 hectares of land.

Lauder Sand Hills, Oak Lake, Oak Lake Marsh, Maple Lake, and Plum Lakes are all part of an Important Bird Area (IBA) of Canada called Oak Lake / Plum Lakes Area (MB 011). This IBA is a very important breeding ground and stop-over for migrating birds and it covers 654.07 km^{2} (252.54 sq mi) of habitat.
