= Hamiota Municipality =

Incorporated municipality in Manitoba, Canada

Hamiota
- Incorporated municipality
- Hamiota Municipality
- Location of the Hamiota Municipality in Manitoba
- Coordinates: 50°11′47″N 100°38′03″W
- Country: Canada
- Province: Manitoba
- Region: Westman
- Incorporated (amalgamated): January 1, 2015

Population (2021)
  - Total: 1,234
- Time zone: UTC-6 (CST)
  - Summer (DST): UTC-5 (CDT)
- Postal code: R0M 0T0

Hamiota Municipality is an incorporated municipality in the Canadian province of Manitoba.

== History ==
Hamiota Municipality was incorporated on January 1, 2015 via the amalgamation of the RM of Hamiota and the Town of Hamiota. It was formed as a requirement of The Municipal Amalgamations Act, which required that municipalities with a population less than 1,000 amalgamate with one or more neighbouring municipalities by 2015. The Government of Manitoba initiated these amalgamations in order for municipalities to meet the 1997 minimum population requirement of 1,000 to incorporate a municipality.

== Communities ==
- Decker
- Hamiota
- Lavinia
- McConnell
- Oakner
- Pope

== Demographics ==
In the 2021 Census of Population conducted by Statistics Canada, Hamiota had a population of 1,234 living in 539 of its 610 total private dwellings, a change of 0.7% from its 2016 population of 1,225. With a land area of 577.68 km^{2} (223.04 sq mi), it had a population density of 2.1/km^{2} (5.5/sq mi) in 2021.
