= Area codes 204, 431, and 584 =

Telephone area codes for Manitoba

Coordinates: 55°4′30″N 97°31′30″W

The numbering plan area of area codes 204, 431, and 584 in blue with neighbouring provinces, territories, and U.S. states in other colours

Area codes 204, 431, and 584 are telephone area codes in the North American Numbering Plan (NANP) for the Canadian province of Manitoba. Area code 204 is one of the nine original North American area codes assigned to Canada in 1947. Area codes 431 and 584 were assigned to the same numbering plan area (NPA) in 2012 and 2022, respectively, forming an overlay complex.

== History ==
When the American Telephone and Telegraph Company (AT&T) designed the first comprehensive North American telephone numbering plan in the 1940s, Manitoba was designated as a single numbering plan area (NPA) with area code 204.

In 2009, the Canadian Numbering Administrator forecast the proliferation of cell phones, particularly in and around Winnipeg, would exhaust the number of unallocated central office prefixes within a few years, even though the province has only 1.2 million people. An area code provides about 7.8 million telephone numbers, but Canada uses an allocation scheme that allots all ten thousand numbers of a central office prefix to each competitive local exchange carriers even for the smallest hamlets. Canada does not implement number pooling.

In July 2010, the Canadian Radio-television and Telecommunications Commission approved a province-wide overlay with area code 431 for implementation in November 2012. On July 30, 2012, 10-digit dialing became mandatory throughout the province.

Area code 584 was reserved as a third area code for the region in February 2017. It was implemented on October 29, 2022.

The incumbent local exchange carrier for the area codes is Bell MTS.

== Service area and central office codes ==
Cities	Area code 204 prefixes	Area code 431 prefixes	Area code 584 prefixes
Alexander	752, 852	643, 832	
Alonsa	767		
Altona	216, 217, 304, 319, 324, 327	342, 402, 671, 733, 965	
Arden	212, 368, 463, 476, 704, 841, 916, 966	212, 221, 351, 759	
Ashern	302, 314, 708, 768	253, 764	
Austin	637	300, 492, 531, 533, 538, 544, 729, 902	
Baldur	535	245	
Basswood	874		
Belmont	536, 537		
Benito	539	905	
Berens River	382, 393		
Beulah	568		
Binscarth	532	880	
Birtle	842	881	
Bissett	277	226, 254, 765	
Bloomfield	395		
Boissevain	215, 305, 440, 533, 534, 552	255, 755, 833	
Bowsman	238, 281, 518, 593, 614, 731, 734	281, 363, 608, 724, 743, 907	
Brampton	236	906	
Brandon	402, 441, 455, 520, 570, 571, 573, 574, 578, 579, 580, 581, 596, 650, 702, 717, 720	210, 213, 308, 432, 483, 540, 541, 542, 602, 720, 721, 724, 725, 726, 727, 728, 729, 730, 740, 761, 765, 901, 922	721
Brochet	323		
Brokenhead	205, 265, 266, 268, 495, 968	218, 343, 403	
Brookdale	354		
Camperville	524		
Carberry	703, 834, 844	219, 646	
Carman	497, 715, 745, 750, 751, 828	237, 344, 379, 526, 771	
Cartwright	529		
Churchill	675	232, 263, 744, 971	
Clarkson	865		
Clear Lake	848	321, 360, 756, 908	
Cormorant	357		
Cowan	569		
Cranberry Portage	472		
Crandall	562		
Cromer	491, 512, 556, 707, 718, 748, 851, 908	295, 324, 412, 645, 763, 839, 961	
Cross Lake	676	230, 264, 434, 745	
Crystal City	873, 875	493, 545, 867	300
Cypress River	743	904	
Darlingford	246		
Dauphin	547, 572, 592, 621, 622, 629, 630, 638, 647, 648, 655, 672, 701	220, 316, 345, 401, 560, 603, 721, 738	
Deloraine	696, 747	236, 361, 740, 889	
Dominion City	387, 427		
Douglas	763, 863	488	
Easterville	329	227, 265, 462, 766	
Eddystone	448, 618	242, 448	
Elgin	769		
Elie	353, 597, 603	329, 453, 496, 731	
Elkhorn	845	325, 895	
Elm Creek	436, 965	497, 547, 872	999
Elmsdale	625		
Emerson	373	404	
Erickson	636	399	
Eriksdale	214, 280, 719, 739	357, 672, 772	
Ethelbert	742		
Falcon Lake	349	328, 413	
Fisher Branch	372	818, 819	
Fisher River	308, 645, 653	256, 463, 767	
Flin Flon	271, 680, 681, 687, 923, 991	217, 346, 746	
Fork River	657		
Garden Hill	456	968	
Gilbert Plains	548	892	
Gimli	407, 442, 519, 641, 642, 643, 644, 651, 671	313, 464, 641	
Gladstone	385, 602	498, 548, 894	
Glenboro	827	299	
Glendon	352		
Goderich	366		
Gods Lake Narrows	335		
Grand Beach	754	228, 260, 769, 962	
Grand Rapids	309, 315, 639, 699	259, 768	
Grandview	546	405, 893	
Gull Lake	635		
Gypsumville	659		
Hadashville	426	732	
Hamiota	764	235, 261, 757, 834, 882	
Hartney	616, 858	858	
Hecla	279		
Holland	526	225, 358, 501, 550, 776, 903	
Ilford	288		
Inglis	563, 564, 690	878	
Inwood	278		
Jacksons ARM	394		
Kelwood	967		
Kenton	838		
Killarney	523, 554, 600	234, 266, 734	
La Broquerie	424		
Lac du Bonnet	213, 340, 345, 350, 459	347, 414, 465, 770, 963	
Lac la Martre	337		
Langruth	445, 607, 843	252, 490, 502, 534, 543, 551	400
Leaf Rapids	473		
Letellier	209, 561, 712, 714, 737, 746, 921	350, 605, 723, 742	
Libau	517, 716, 766	262	
Little Grand Rapids	397		
Lundar	700, 762	966	
Lynn Lake	356		
MacGregor	516, 605, 685	380, 454, 504	666
Mafeking	545	909	
Manigotagan	363		
Manitou	242	284, 359, 773	
McAuley	722		
McCreary	835	896	
Melita	264, 522, 551, 576, 591, 634, 649, 658, 665, 673, 686	604, 722, 727, 741, 886	
Miami	432, 435	505, 783	
Miniota	525, 567	280	
Minnedosa	210, 705, 867, 868, 907	362, 415, 758, 835	
Minto	776	874	
Moose Lake	678		
Morden	501, 812, 822, 823	216, 349, 486, 487, 774	
Nelson House	484		
Ninette	528		
Norway House	301, 359	241, 436, 599, 748	
Notre Dame De Lourdes	248	512, 730, 784, 871	777
Oak Lake	855	333, 960	
Oak River	566	875	
Oakbank	270, 403, 419, 443, 444, 446, 506, 541, 601, 606, 674, 755, 816, 817, 818, 819, 853, 860, 862, 866, 878, 879, 900, 902, 961	296, 297, 314, 348, 430, 452, 491, 494, 499, 500, 513, 535, 536, 537, 549, 600, 631, 814, 829, 830, 831, 925, 926	600
Oakburn	234, 559, 759	884	
Oakville	267, 964	514, 785	500
Ochre River	496, 733		
Oxford House	538	231, 267, 437, 749	
Pelican Rapids	587		
Pikwitonei	458		
Pilot Mound	208, 245, 825	268, 455, 515, 736, 868	
Pinawa	753		
Pine Falls	317, 367, 830	466, 964	
Pine River	263		
Pineal Lake	276		
Piney	423		
Plum Coulee	829		
Plumas	386		
Poplar River	244		
Poplarfield	660, 664		
Port Du Bois	884	269	
Portage la Prairie	203, 239, 240, 241, 243, 249, 252, 274, 400, 428, 521, 595, 604, 692, 814, 839, 850, 856, 857, 870, 871, 872, 892, 893, 903	251, 303, 304, 306, 315, 318, 319, 322, 332, 340, 400, 457, 495, 503, 516, 522, 546, 622, 640, 644, 786, 922, 927, 931	200, 444
Pukatawagon	553		
Rapid City	826, 913	879	
Rathwell	749	246, 517, 901	
Red Sucker Lake	469		
Rennie	369		
Rivers	303, 328, 398, 412, 710	270, 406, 836	
Riverton	378	272, 283	
Roblin	207, 247, 465, 917, 937	271, 760, 837, 890, 937	
Roland	313, 343	247, 518	
Rorketon	732		
Rossburn	859	286, 883	
Russell	773, 796, 821	326, 352, 407, 761, 888	
Saint Agathe	882, 883	375, 408, 409, 506	222
Saint Anne Des Chenes	401, 422	416, 675	
Saint Catharines Thorold	450, 462, 980	288, 439, 752	
Saint Claude	379, 609	376, 524, 873	
Saint Francois Xavier	840, 864	377, 507, 527	333
Saint Jean De Matha	758		
Saint Laurent	640, 646		
Saint Lazare	683, 847	257, 898	
Saint Malo	347, 433, 598		
Sainte Rose du Lac	447, 613	233, 289, 327, 739	
Sandy Lake	575, 585, 849	897	
Sanford	405, 418, 508, 706, 736	298, 456, 519	
Selkirk	406, 420, 438, 481, 482, 485, 492, 498, 527, 549, 738, 757, 785, 904, 909, 971, 994	238, 312, 339, 484, 561, 606	
Shamattawa	565		
Sherbrooke	468		
Sidney	466	248, 330, 520	
Sinclair	577, 662, 854, 877	642, 647	
Snow Lake	358	201, 750, 779, 972	
Snowflake	876		
Somerset	744, 973	249, 521, 869	
Souris	316, 413, 483, 709, 741	353	
South Indian Lake	374		
Sperling	626	250, 523	
Split Lake	342	274, 438, 751, 782	
Sprague	437	287	
Starbuck	735	301, 341, 378, 508, 525, 532, 941	
Steep Rock	449		
Steinbach	300, 320, 321, 326, 346, 355, 370, 371, 377, 380, 381, 388, 392, 408, 434, 439, 503, 540, 543, 544, 846, 905, 912, 972, 993	205, 215, 309, 366, 562, 607, 673, 674, 698, 726	
Strathclair	365	282, 291, 331, 762, 838, 891, 973	
Sundance	486, 652	258, 285, 435, 747	
Swan Lake	836, 974	320, 369, 529, 870, 929	
Tadoule Lake	684		
Teulon	206, 861, 886	365, 676, 735	
The Pas	617, 620, 623, 624, 627, 969, 978	229, 239, 355, 753	
Thicket Portage	286		
Thompson	307, 550, 670, 677, 679, 778, 939, 970	224, 243, 354, 563, 609, 725, 754	
Treherne	608, 693, 713, 723	290, 530, 900, 930	
Victoria	756		
Vidir	364, 376, 494	461, 737	
Vita	425		
Wabowden	689		
Wainfleet	457		
Wanless	682		
Warren	322, 344, 375, 383, 404, 454, 461, 464, 467, 490, 507, 513, 530, 906	223, 244, 292, 302, 305, 368, 381, 410, 442, 509, 528, 678, 928, 967	301
Waterhen	628		
Wawanesa	820, 824	417, 876	
Whitemouth	348, 351		
Winkler	312, 325, 331, 332, 361, 362, 384, 493, 502, 531, 542	240, 356, 775, 822	
Winnipeg	200, 201, 202, 218, 219, 220, 221, 222, 223, 224, 225, 226, 227, 228, 229, 230, 231, 232, 233, 235, 237, 250, 251, 253, 254, 255, 256, 257, 258, 259, 260, 261, 262, 269, 272, 275, 282, 283, 284, 285, 287, 289, 290, 291, 292, 293, 294, 295, 296, 297, 298, 299, 306, 318, 330, 333, 334, 336, 338, 339, 360, 390, 391, 396, 399, 410, 414, 415, 416, 417, 421, 430, 451, 452, 453, 470, 471, 474, 475, 477, 478, 479, 480, 487, 488, 489, 499, 500, 504, 505, 509, 510, 514, 515, 557, 558, 560, 582, 583, 586, 588, 589, 590, 594, 599, 612, 615, 619, 631, 632, 633, 654, 661, 663, 666, 667, 668, 669, 688, 691, 694, 695, 697, 698, 760, 770, 771, 772, 774, 775, 777, 779, 780, 781, 782, 783, 784, 786, 787, 788, 789, 790, 791, 792, 793, 794, 795, 797, 798, 799, 800, 801, 802, 803, 804, 805, 806, 807, 808, 809, 813, 815, 831, 832, 833, 837, 869, 880, 881, 885, 887, 888, 889, 890, 891, 894, 895, 896, 897, 898, 899, 910, 914, 915, 918, 919, 920, 924, 925, 926, 927, 928, 929, 930, 931, 932, 933, 934, 935, 936, 938, 940, 941, 942, 943, 944, 945, 946, 947, 948, 949, 951, 952, 953, 954, 955, 956, 957, 958, 960, 962, 963, 975, 977, 979, 981, 982, 983, 984, 985, 986, 987, 988, 989, 990, 992, 995, 996, 997, 998, 999	200, 202, 203, 206, 207, 208, 209, 214, 222, 275, 276, 277, 278, 279, 293, 294, 307, 317, 323, 334, 335, 336, 337, 338, 370, 371, 373, 374, 383, 388, 390, 391, 392, 393, 394, 395, 396, 420, 421, 422, 423, 424, 425, 426, 427, 428, 429, 433, 440, 441, 444, 445, 446, 447, 449, 450, 451, 458, 470, 478, 482, 485, 489, 552, 553, 554, 556, 557, 558, 559, 570, 575, 588, 590, 601, 612, 655, 668, 681, 688, 699, 700, 701, 702, 728, 777, 778, 788, 791, 792, 800, 801, 802, 803, 804, 805, 806, 807, 808, 809, 812, 813, 815, 816, 841, 842, 843, 844, 845, 846, 847, 848, 849, 855, 866, 877, 885, 887, 899, 932, 944, 945, 946, 947, 948, 949, 951, 952, 953, 954, 955, 977, 988, 989, 990, 996, 997, 998, 999	290, 291, 888
Winnipeg Beach	389, 409	467	
Winnipegosis	656		
Woodridge	429		
Yorkton	341		

== See also ==
- Telephone numbers in Canada

Manitoba area codes: 204/431/584
	North: 867	
West: 306/474/639	204/431/584	East: 807, 468/819/873
	South: 701, 218	
Yukon, Northwest Territories and Nunavut area codes: 867
Saskatchewan area codes: 306/474/639
Ontario area codes: 416/437/647/942, 519/226/548/382, 613/343/753, 705/249/683, 807, 905/289/365/742
Quebec area codes: 367/418/581, 354/450/579, 263/438/514, 468/819/873
Minnesota area codes: 218, 320, 507/924, 612, 651, 763, 952
North Dakota area codes: 701
