= Elgin, Manitoba =

Elgin
- Unincorporated Urban Community
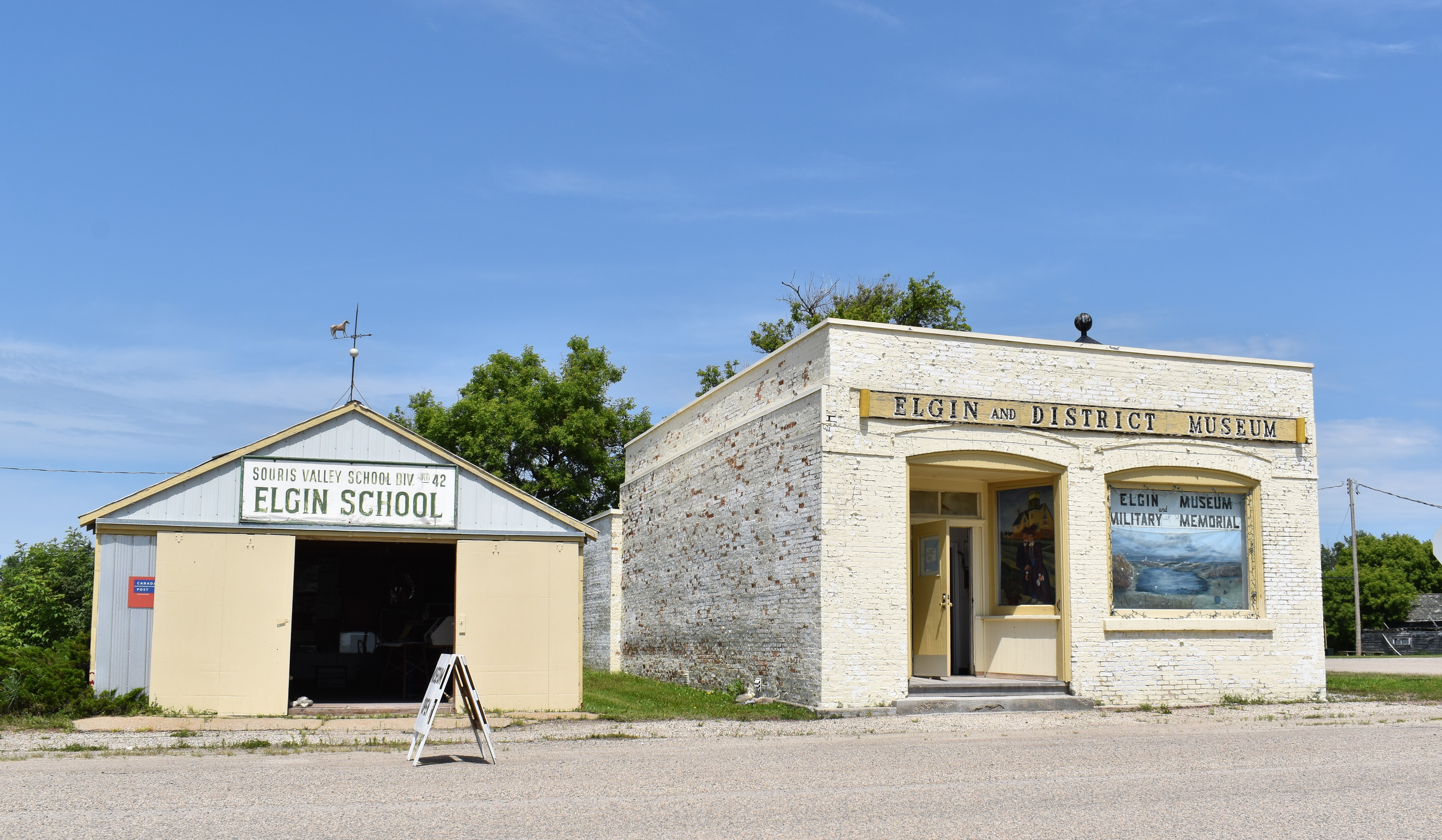
- Elgin and District Museum

- Location of Hartney in Manitoba
- Coordinates: 49°26′31″N 100°16′09″W
- Established: 1898
- Incorporated: Unknown
- Lost Incorporation: January 1, 2015

Elgin is an unincorporated community recognized as a local urban district in the Municipality of Grassland in the Canadian province of Manitoba, Canada. It currently has a population of just over 100.

== Major attractions ==
The Elgin and District Historical Museum, open during July and August, details the history of Elgin and of the Rural Municipality of Whitewater. The Whitewater Centennial Park, located one mile east of Elgin, is a popular recreation area for birdwatching, camping, picnicking, golfing, hiking and other recreational activities. Elgin also has a museum that is open all summer on weekends.

== Notable people ==
- James O. Argue, Manitoba Legislative Assembly
- Bill Stilwell, Author
- Larry Maguire, Former MLA for Arthur-Virden and former Member of Parliament for Brandon-Souris
