= Rural Municipality of Whitehead =

Rural municipality in Manitoba, Canada

- Rural municipality
- Location of the RM of Whitehead in Manitoba
- Coordinates: 49°47′53″N 100°15′27″W
- Country: Canada
- Province: Manitoba
- Region: Westman

Area
  - Land: 577.60 km^{2} (223.01 sq mi)

Population (2021)
  - Total: 1,679
- Time zone: UTC-6 (CST)
  - Summer (DST): UTC-5 (CDT)
- Area codes: 204 and 431
- Website: rmofwhitehead.ca

Whitehead is a rural municipality (RM) in the province of Manitoba in Western Canada. It is west of Brandon and the principle communities within its boundaries are Kemnay and Alexander.

It became a municipality on 22 December 1883 and was named for Joseph Whitehead, a railway contractor who was active in the area during the 1880s.

== Communities ==
- Alexander
- Ashbury
- Beresford
- Kemnay
- Villette
- Roseland

== Demographics ==
In the 2021 Census of Population conducted by Statistics Canada, Whitehead had a population of 1,679 living in 612 of its 645 total private dwellings, a change of 1.7% from its 2016 population of 1,651. With a land area of 577.6 km^{2} (223.0 sq mi), it had a population density of 2.9/km^{2} (7.5/sq mi) in 2021.
