= Souris, Manitoba =

Community in Manitoba

Souris
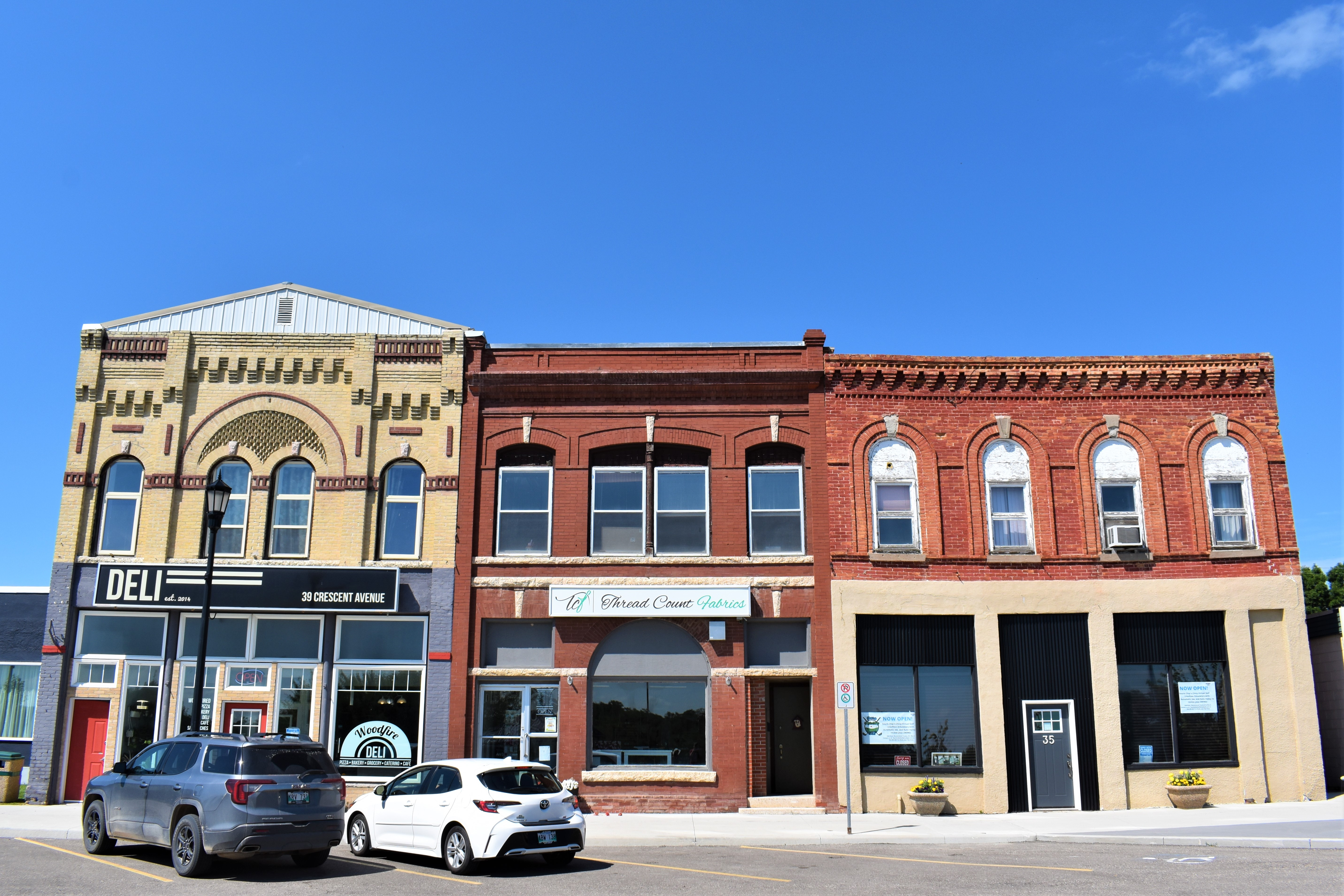
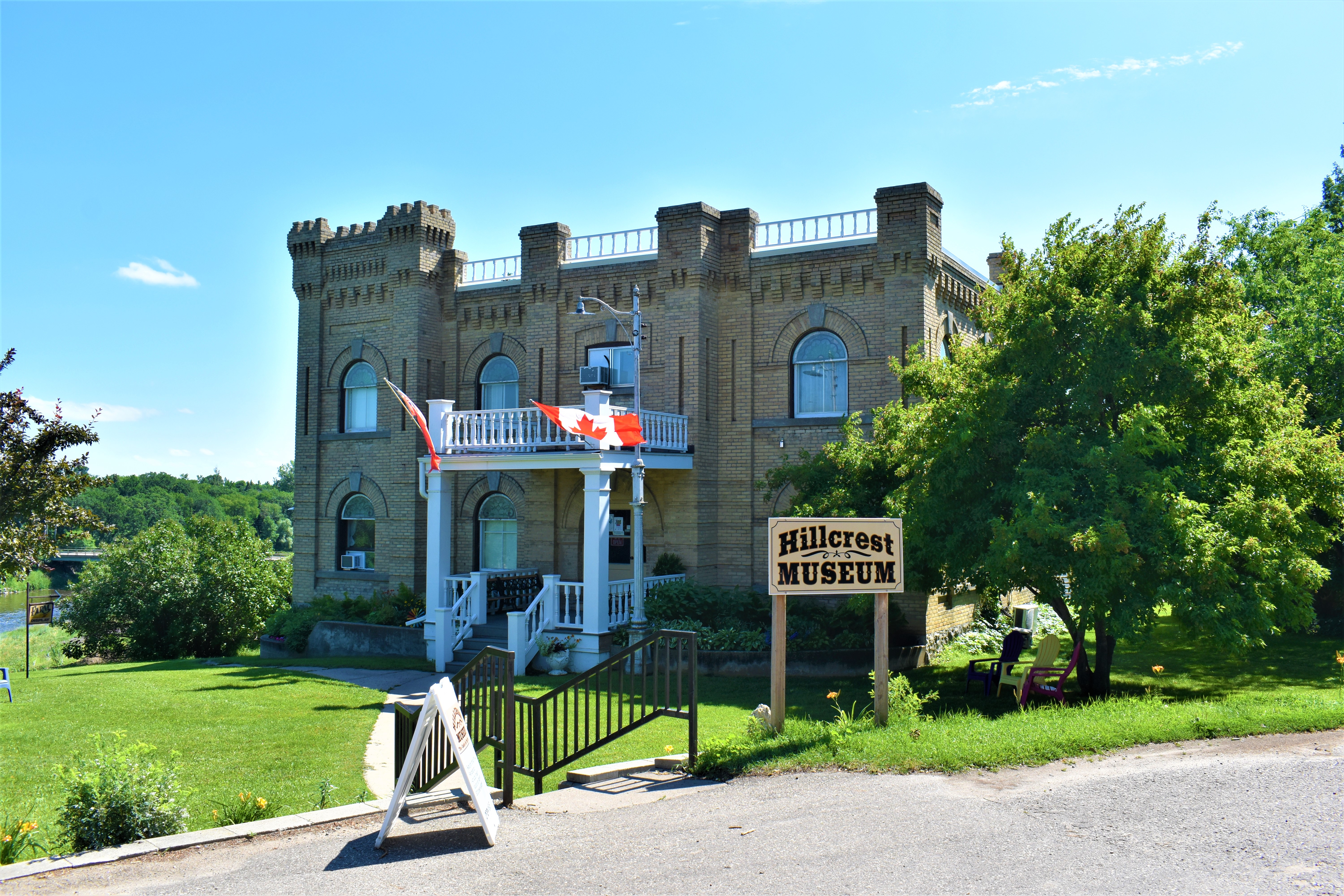
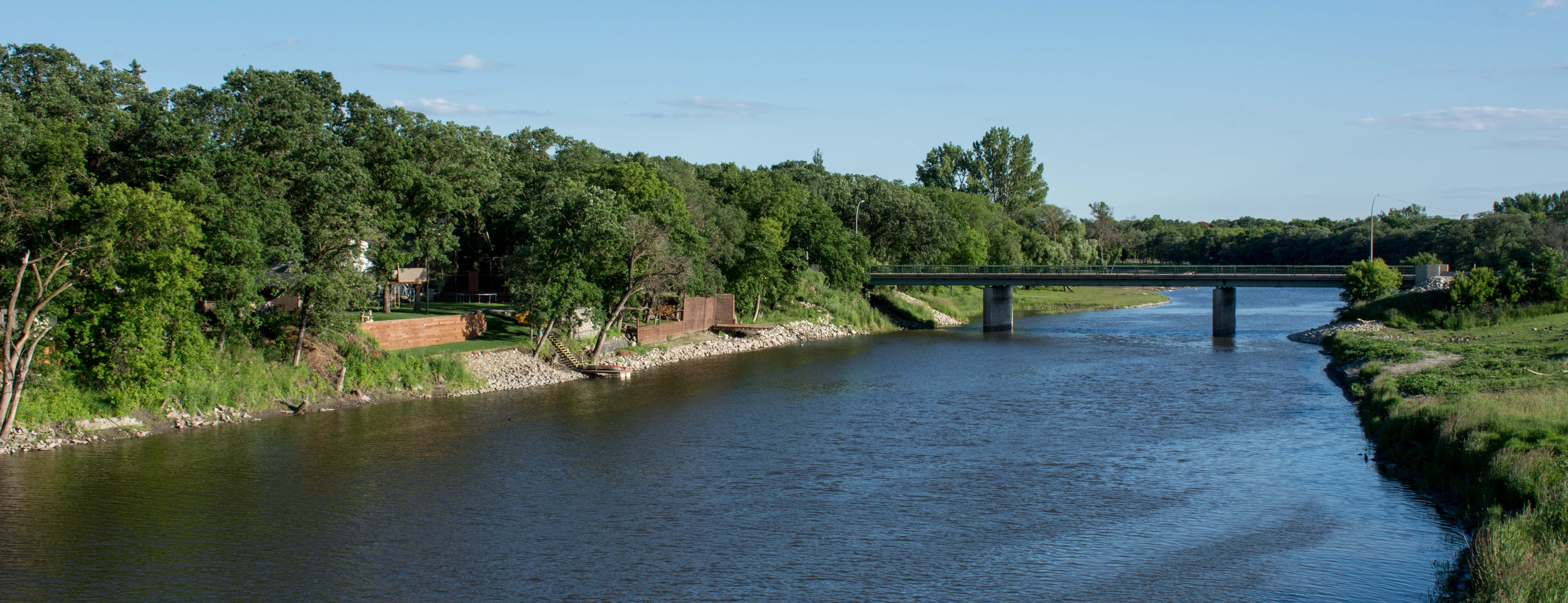
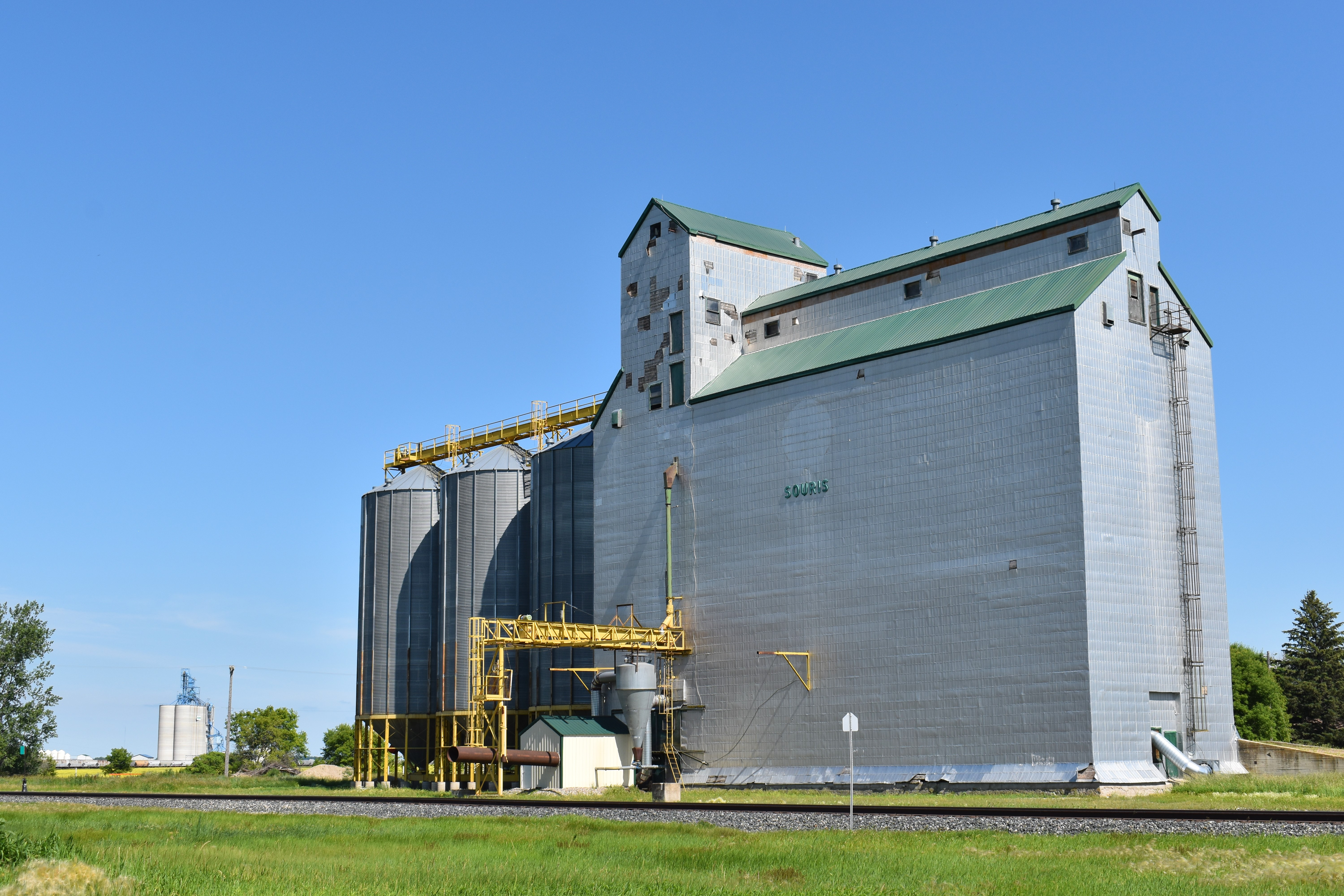
- From top, left to right: A view of the Souris skyline from Victoria Park, historic buildings on Crescent Avenue, Hillcrest Museum, the Souris River, and grain elevators in Souris.

- Location of Souris, Manitoba Souris (Canada)
- Coordinates: 49°37′02″N 100°15′37″W
- Country: Canada
- Province: Manitoba
- Municipality: Souris-Glenwood
- Established: 1881
- Incorporated: 1903
- Amalgamation: 2015

Government
  - MLA: Colleen Robbins
  - MP: Grant Jackson (CPC)

Area (2021)
  - Land: 3.35 km^{2} (1.29 sq mi)
  - Population centre: 2.5 km^{2} (0.97 sq mi)
  - Census subdivision (Souris-Glenwood): 579.69 km^{2} (223.82 sq mi)
- Elevation (at weather station): 432.8 m (1,420 ft)

Population (2021)
  - Total: 1,970
  - Density: 588.7/km^{2} (1,525/sq mi)
  - Population centre: 1,935
  - Population centre density: 772.6/km^{2} (2,001/sq mi)
  - Census subdivision: 2,547
  - Census subdivision density: 4.4/km^{2} (11/sq mi)
- Demonym: Sourisites
- Time zone: UTC−06:00 (CST)
  - Summer (DST): UTC−05:00 (CDT)
- Postal code: R0K 2C0
- Area code: 204
- Website: sourismanitoba.com

Souris (2021 population: 1,970) is an unincorporated urban community in the Municipality of Souris-Glenwood within the Canadian province of Manitoba that held town status prior to the Manitoba municipal amalgamations on January 1, 2015. It is located within the municipality at the confluence of Plum Creek and Souris River, from which it takes its name. Before 1882, the town was called Plum Creek.

The community is home to Canada's longest historic cable-stayed footbridge at 177 m (581 ft) long, known as the Swinging Bridge, which spans the Souris River that divides the community. The Swinging Bridge was built in 1904 as a means of transportation over the Souris River. In 2013, a modern cable bridge was installed to replace the original swinging bridge, which had been destroyed by flooding in prior years.

== History ==
The area of Souris was first explored by Europeans when La Vérendrye arrived in 1738, when it seems he initially mistook the Souris River for the Missouri River. The area of the townsite was later explored by David Thompson in 1797-98 and Alexander Henry the younger in 1805. Detailed accounts of life on the Souris plains in the early 1800s were diarized in detail by a Captain John Rogers. His diaries remain saved with the Government of Manitoba's Archive Division today. Rogers was later killed in the Battle of Seven Oaks, ending his exploration of the area. In the years after, considerable fur trade continued in the area, documented by Peter Garrioch in 1843-44. Buffalo still roamed these plains in the early 1800s before the herds were killed out.

From the mid-century to the late 1800s, only the Assiniboine roamed these areas. The first permanent settlers to the area arrived in 1880 when Captain Gilbert Wood, his wife, and two children came to the area. They travelled to Winnipeg by way of Chicago, from there they took a buckboard wagon west, pulled by oxen while a steamship carried their goods up the Assiniboine River. Captain Wood had heard of a man named Lang who told him the land at Plum Creek and the Souris River was a beautiful place to settle. Wood, curious by this notion, hired a guide by the name of Bangs and they set out to see the area for themselves. This resulted in a 3-4 day round trip from their camp at Millford which is on the south bank of the Assiniboine at Treesbank. When they returned his wife asked him what he thought of the area, to which he replied that it was a beautiful district, the best he had seen in all their journeys. To this Mrs. Wood replied "Then take me to Plum Creek."

They would arrive to the area on August 28, 1880. While setting up a homestead there they encountered a man, Squire Sowden from Millbrook, Ontario. Sowden was shocked to find a woman and children in what was then the middle of nowhere. The Woods would build a shanty on the shores of Plum Creek that would serve as a landing place for many new settlers to the area. Mrs. Wood later recounted a time when as many as 21 people were sleeping in their 3.7 m × 4.9 m (12 ft × 16 ft) sod shanty. Captain Wood lived until 1903 while Mrs. Wood died in 1928.

The first large settlement was led by Squire Sowden. In 1880 he was appointed head of a Colonization Syndicate in Millbrook by a group of businessmen looking to settle the area. He explored the area of Plum Creek at Souris, adventuring as far west as today's Gainsborough, Saskatchewan. This is the time when Squire met the Woods, while exploring the area in early fall 1880. The sites were good and he selected several surveyed townships for their future settlement. Sowden and the businessmen sent a proposal to Ottawa which was accepted and the venture was begun. Sowden and the men arranged for land to be purchased at $3.00 an acre and each settler paid $25.00 for a receipt which was to be presented at the Land Office at the mouth of the Souris River when they completed their registration. The settlers travelled from Ontario to Detroit by train, then travelling from there to Chicago, next to Saint Paul, Minnesota, before eventually reaching Saint Boniface, Manitoba. Here they would travel the rough roads west by cart and storing their heavier goods until they could be shipped to the mouth of the Souris River when navigable. When the settlers reached the land at last, they saw the land was good and set to work establishing their homesteads.

The first building in the town was erected in 1881. The next few years saw the townsite continue to grow as more and more settlers reached the area. Many of the settlers returned home the first winter in 1881 to Ontario, but the following year they returned with more goods, and many more settlers followed them. The town grew at an exceptional rate in 1882. Many of the settlers were now arriving at the town from Brandon via the Canadian Pacific Railway rather than the Boundary Commission Trail located to the south. Many of the settlers were coming from the "old countries" of the United Kingdom and particularly from Ireland.

Sowden had originally chosen the Plum Creek site because he wanted to build a mill there and this he completed in those early years. The mill was successful and despite drought years in that decade, the products of the mill became quite popular in the area and country. As the grain became popular, local farmers would have to bring their wheat to Brandon or Alexander as there was no rail service in Souris. Beginning in 1890 negotiations were made with the Canadian Pacific Railway (CPR) to bring the railway to the town and in 1892 the Glenboro Line was completed to the town. This brought further and increased growth to the community as many towns of the era hitched their prosperity to the railway. Before the turn of the century five grain elevators stood alongside the railway. In 1902 a brickyard was established in the community, it only operated for a few short years, but 40 of the town's major brick commercial and residential buildings were built by these bricks. Many of these buildings are still standing today. As a result of this exceptional growth, the community was incorporated as a town in 1904 as the population neared a thousand people.

== Geography ==
Souris is located at the conjunction of Plum Creek and the Souris River on the Canadian Prairies. A dam lies at the east of town on the Souris River in order to maintain recreational usage water levels. In the past the dam was meant to keep waters high enough for operation of the flour mill. With Souris residing in Palliser's Triangle the region can be prone to regular and lengthy droughts. The city of Brandon is located 50 km (31 mi) to the northeast. Souris lies between the Brandon Hills located to the northeast and the Turtle Mountain Plateau located approximately 80 km (50 mi) south of the town. Whitewater Lake, an endorheic basin lies between the Turtle Mountains and the town.

Climate data for Souris Climate ID: 5012719; coordinates 49°39′N 100°15′W; elevation: 432.8 m (1,420 ft); 1991–2020 normals, extremes 1982−2006
Month	Jan	Feb	Mar	Apr	May	Jun	Jul	Aug	Sep	Oct	Nov	Dec	Year
Record high °C (°F)	8.0 (46.4)	16.0 (60.8)	17.5 (63.5)	30.0 (86.0)	34.5 (94.1)	36.0 (96.8)	35.0 (95.0)	39.0 (102.2)	36.0 (96.8)	31.5 (88.7)	20.0 (68.0)	9.0 (48.2)	39.0 (102.2)
Mean daily maximum °C (°F)	−10.3 (13.5)	−7.1 (19.2)	−0.3 (31.5)	10.8 (51.4)	18.4 (65.1)	22.8 (73.0)	25.5 (77.9)	25.5 (77.9)	19.2 (66.6)	10.9 (51.6)	−0.8 (30.6)	−8.2 (17.2)	8.9 (48.0)
Daily mean °C (°F)	−16 (3)	−13 (9)	−5.8 (21.6)	4.2 (39.6)	11.1 (52.0)	16.3 (61.3)	18.6 (65.5)	18.0 (64.4)	12.0 (53.6)	4.4 (39.9)	−5.9 (21.4)	−13.7 (7.3)	2.5 (36.5)
Mean daily minimum °C (°F)	−21.6 (−6.9)	−18.8 (−1.8)	−11.3 (11.7)	−2.4 (27.7)	3.8 (38.8)	9.7 (49.5)	11.7 (53.1)	10.4 (50.7)	4.7 (40.5)	−2.2 (28.0)	−10.8 (12.6)	−19.1 (−2.4)	−3.8 (25.2)
Record low °C (°F)	−45 (−49)	−42.5 (−44.5)	−40 (−40)	−22.5 (−8.5)	−12.5 (9.5)	−3 (27)	0.0 (32.0)	−3.5 (25.7)	−8 (18)	−25 (−13)	−34 (−29)	−43 (−45)	−45 (−49)
Average precipitation mm (inches)	23.5 (0.93)	17.5 (0.69)	26.1 (1.03)	27.5 (1.08)	64.9 (2.56)	92.1 (3.63)	72.6 (2.86)	54.5 (2.15)	41.6 (1.64)	35.2 (1.39)	24.7 (0.97)	28.5 (1.12)	508.8 (20.03)
Average rainfall mm (inches)	0.6 (0.02)	1.3 (0.05)	7.7 (0.30)	16.6 (0.65)	57.2 (2.25)	92.1 (3.63)	72.6 (2.86)	54.5 (2.15)	41.3 (1.63)	26.5 (1.04)	6.2 (0.24)	0.8 (0.03)	377.4 (14.86)
Average snowfall cm (inches)	23.0 (9.1)	16.2 (6.4)	18.3 (7.2)	10.8 (4.3)	5.6 (2.2)	0.0 (0.0)	0.0 (0.0)	0.0 (0.0)	0.3 (0.1)	8.6 (3.4)	18.5 (7.3)	27.7 (10.9)	129.0 (50.8)
Average precipitation days (≥ 0.2 mm)	7.3	4.7	5.9	6.2	10.2	12.7	10.4	9.2	8.7	8.1	5.6	7.6	96.5
Average rainy days (≥ 0.2 mm)	0.22	0.27	1.6	4.3	9.8	12.7	10.4	9.2	8.6	6.7	1.4	0.55	65.7
Average snowy days (≥ 0.2 cm)	7.2	4.5	4.6	2.5	0.8	0.0	0.0	0.0	0.1	1.8	4.6	7.0	33.1
Source: Environment and Climate Change Canada

== Economy ==
As a small agrarian town, about 28% of the town's jobs are located in the agricultural sector, the second largest sector is the health and social assistance sector making up 20% of Souris jobs, and education makes up the third largest group at 10% of local area jobs. Statistically the economy appears healthy in the Souris region with job growth from 2014-19 showing a 23.5% increase with 346 new jobs created over the five-year period. Average household income in the community is $68,000, below both the provincial ($79,500) and the municipality ($72,500) averages. Agriculture in the region is led by growing crops such as wheat, corn, canola, and soybeans. Livestock is also important in the town's agricultural economic region with cattle, swine, and sheep being farmed commercially in the Souris area.

== Demographics ==
Historical population
Year	Pop.	±%
1901	839	—
1911	1,854	+121.0%
1921	1,710	−7.8%
1931	1,661	−2.9%
1941	1,346	−19.0%
1951	1,584	+17.7%
1961	1,841	+16.2%
1996	1,613	−12.4%
2001	1,683	+4.3%
2006	1,772	+5.3%
2011	1,716	−3.2%
2016	1,974	+15.0%
2021	1,970	−0.2%
The large positive population trend in 2011-2016 is a result of a change in the census assessment area.

In the 2021 Canadian census conducted by Statistics Canada, Souris had a population of 1,970 living in 871 of its 960 total private dwellings, a change of −0.2% from its 2016 population of 1,974. With a land area of 3.35 km^{2} (1.29 sq mi), it had a population density of 588.1/km^{2} (1,523.1/sq mi) in 2021.

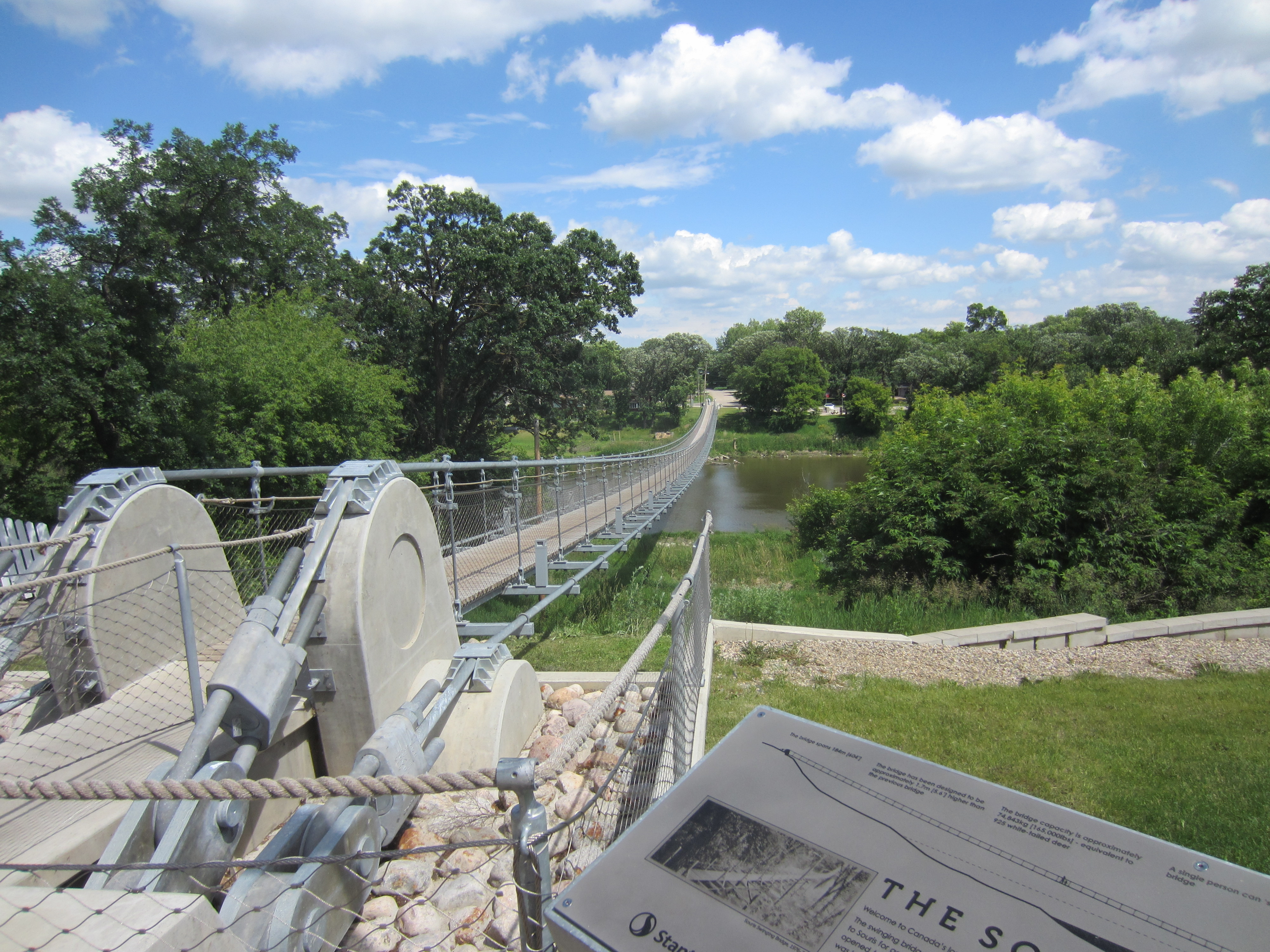
Bridge over the Souris River at Souris, Manitoba. It spans 184 m (604 ft) and has a weight capacity of 925 white-tailed deer. This bridge was built in 2013 to replace the bridge that was demolished in 2011 due to flooding. The first suspension bridge at Souris was erected in 1904.

== Attractions ==
The Souris Swinging Bridge was destroyed in the 1976 flood and again in the flood of 2011. A new, higher, swinging bridge opened during the summer of 2013. A new swimming pool was constructed in 2010 and is located in Victoria Park, along with numerous walking trails and a bird sanctuary known for its flock of peacocks.

== Sports ==
Souris is home to the Southwest Cougars, an ice hockey team which plays in the Manitoba U-18 'AAA' Hockey League. It is also home of the Souris Sabres, which is part of the Souris School athletics program, and a member of the Manitoba High School Athletic Association. They participate in 15 sports, including; hockey, basketball, volleyball, football, and rugby.

Another local hockey team is the Souris Elks, which is a senior team in the Tiger Hills Hockey League.

== Notable people ==
- Tyson Kozak, Buffalo Sabres player
- Alice Masak French, an Inuvialuk author
- Andy Murray, former St. Louis Blues and Los Angeles Kings coach
- Emily Tuttosi, a member of the women's Canadian national rugby team
