= Hamiota, Manitoba =

Town in Canada

Coordinates: 50°10′50″N 100°35′46″W

Location of Hamiota in Manitoba

Hamiota is an unincorporated urban community in the Hamiota Municipality within the Canadian province of Manitoba that held town status prior to January 1, 2015. It is located on Provincial Trunk Highway 21 (PTH 21) midway between the Trans-Canada Highway and the Yellowhead Highway. It is located in Western Manitoba, 84 kilometres northwest of Brandon. The trading area radius of 20 kilometres has approximately 10,000 people. First known as Hamilton, for Thomas Hamilton, one of the first settlers, the town name was changed to avoid confusion with Hamilton, Ontario. The new name contracted Hamilton with the Sioux word ota, "much".

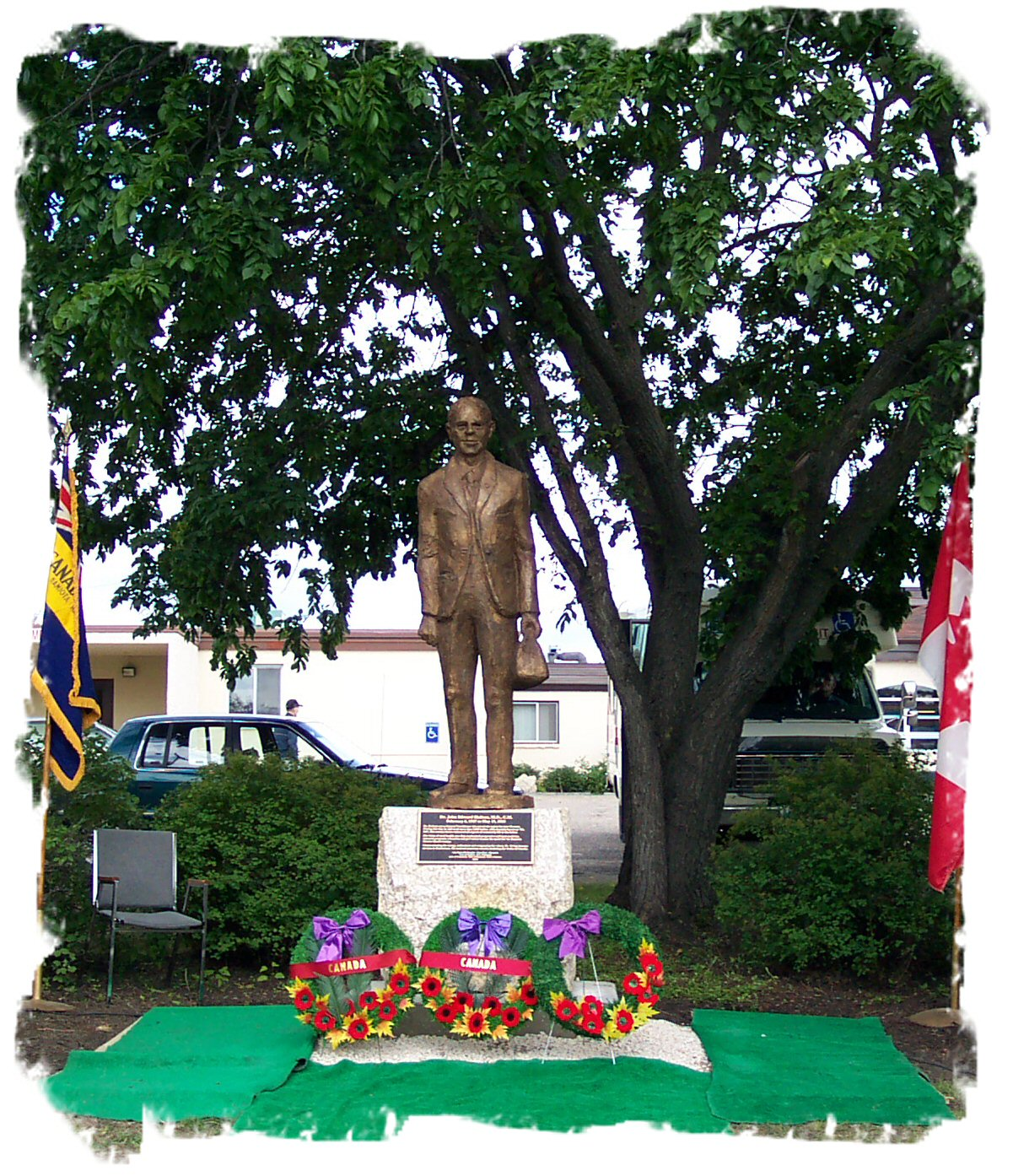
Dr. John E. Hudson, a notable resident of Hamiota

== Demographics ==
In the 2021 Census of Population conducted by Statistics Canada, Hamiota had a population of 856 living in 393 of its 438 total private dwellings, a change of 1.8% from its 2016 population of 841. With a land area of 3.35 km^{2} (1.29 sq mi), it had a population density of 255.5/km^{2} (661.8/sq mi) in 2021.

== Culture ==
Hamiota is known for its local sports teams, arts and culture community, and health care. Hamiota was the home of Dr. John E. Hudson ("Dr. Ed": 1917–2003), a member of the Order of Canada (2001) and recipient of the Queen Elizabeth II Golden Anniversary Medal (2003). Dr. Hudson led Hamiota District Health Center to become the model rural health care facility in Manitoba. A memorial statue of Dr. Hudson was erected near the hospital in 2004. MP Inky Mark was the main force behind the statue project. The community offers arts/cultural opportunities through the new Heritage Arts Center. Formerly known as the Royal Bank Building, the Heritage Arts Center was constructed as the Union Bank in 1905. Now occupied by the Mid-West Arts Council, the building provides a space for exhibiting of art, serving as the only exhibition space within the district.

Hamiota Pioneer Club Museum features artifacts relating to the settlement and development of the district, including a taxidermy display, the former McConnell railway station and their most recent addition, the Oakner Church.

== Economy ==
The agriculture, healthcare and education sectors are the major employers within the area. Within the last four years, the region has seen growth in the agriculture sector. Over 100 new jobs have been created in Hamiota and area in the last three to four years with many of these in the expanding livestock sector.

== Education and health ==
Hamiota District Health Care Centre embraced the "community health care concept in the early 1970s.

The Pope National Wildlife Reserve was used as a water storage area for the railway during the age of steam locomotives, these parcels of land were returned to the federal government with the advent of the diesel engine. The area was designated as a national wildlife reserve in 1972. It is one of the few federally-owned parcels of land remaining in Manitoba, and is an important water source for the wetlands and marshes located downstream.

== Biodiversity ==
Hamiota has one of the few known nesting sites for the Western Plains garter snake a species once thought to be extinct. A hibernaculum was built for the snakes 6.5 kilometres west of the community.

== Leisure ==
The Pitlockery Trail takes walkers east of Hamiota to view the marsh life and enjoy the sounds of the bird population. Spring brings warblers, blackbirds and ducks; many stay to raise their young for the summer, only to migrate south in the fall season. Chickadees keep watch over the frozen marsh during winter, awaiting the return of spring. The trail is located along the former railway line.

The Chumah Trail allows outdoor enthusiasts west of Hamiota to enjoy the prairie grasslands and native vegetation. A viewing platform for birds has been constructed at the end of the trail branching off to the north. With more tree and bush cover, this trail is better situated for cross country skiing in the winter and is groomed regularly. The trail is located along the former railway line.

Hamiota Municipal Park was established in 1967 as part of Canada's centennial celebrations. It is home to seven ball diamonds, an outdoor equestrian arena, horse and cattle barns, soccer pitch, beach volleyball, children's playground, 28 site serviced campground, Hamiota Municipal Museum and the Hamiota Aquatic Centre. Located next to the Hamiota & District Sports Complex and the 9-hole Hamiota Golf Course, the park is the host for sports.

== Notable people ==
- Sandra Birdsell, writer
- Grahame Budge, rugby player
- Beth Cochran, basketball player and educator
- Lyndon Johnston, pair skater
- Michael Kwiatkowski, Ukrainian Greek Catholic Archbishop of Winnipeg (2026-)
- John Marks, hockey player
- Dallas Smith, hockey player
