= Alexander, Manitoba =

Alexander
- Location of Alexander in Manitoba
- Coordinates: 49°49′48″N 100°17′43″W
- Country: Canada
- Province: Manitoba
- Region: Westman
- Census Division: No. 7

Government
  - MP: Grant Jackson (Brandon–Souris)
  - MLA: Colleen Robbins (Spruce Woods)

Population (2021 Canadian census)
  - Total: 321
- Time zone: UTC−6 (CST)
  - Summer (DST): UTC−5 (CDT)
- Postal Code: R0C 0E0
- Area code: 204

Alexander, Manitoba, is a local urban district in the Rural Municipality of Whitehead, situated on Highway 1, west of Brandon.

The community's closest city is Brandon, Manitoba, and their school is part of the Brandon School Division.

== History ==
In 1882, the site was made a rail point on the Canadian Pacific Railway (CPR) and a post office was opened, initially known as Pulteney. Built as a small hotel, residence and store, with the central portion occupied by the post office, the structure was built by the community's first postmaster, James Frederick Walker, whose family provided postal services to the community until 1949.

The site was renamed Alexander Station in 1885, which was shortened to Alexander in 1891. There are two main explanations for the current name. First is that the name was selected by the CPR after an early settler named Alexander Speers. The other explanation is that it got its name from the first Canadian Prime Minister John A. Macdonald's middle name.

Around 1916, a wooden grain elevator at Alexander was opened and operated by Paterson Grain. Traded to Manitoba Pool Elevators in mid-1988, it was destroyed by fire on 10 September 1990.

On 23 July 1922, a monument was unveiled by the Alexander branch of the Imperial Order Daughters of the Empire in commemoration of people from the local area killed during military service.

The Alexander Post Office was formerly described as one of the oldest private post offices still in use in the Province of Manitoba. It became a municipally-designated historic site in 1993. Later in 2023 the Alexander Post Office was demolished and replaced with a home.

=== Religion ===
The first Anglican church services at Alexander were held between 1884 and 1887 in the waiting room of the CPR station, after which they used the local Presbyterian church. A dedicated wood-frame church building was constructed in 1900. Services were held until October 1974 and a fieldstone cairn in front of the church building was installed in 1975. The building was turned over to the Diocese of Brandon in May 1978 and it was eventually renovated into a private residence.

A church was built in Alexander for a Presbyterian congregation in 1889. In 1919, the congregation merged with that of the local Methodist church to form a United church (known as Union church until 1925); the Presbyterian building continued to be used for services while the Methodist building was sold for use as a Masonic lodge.

=== School ===
The Alexander School District was formally established in October 1884, with the first 18-by-26-foot (5.5 m × 7.9 m) schoolhouse being built in 1886 on the south side of the railway at a cost of $600.

Due to growing student enrollment, a second classroom was constructed in 1892. It was a three-room brick veneer building, built at a cost of $2,930. Ten years later, a two-storey brick building was erected.

In 1945, Alexander School gained more students as the nearby Dalton School and Assiniboine School closed. In 1960, high school students were bused to Brandon, leaving only students in grades 1 to 8 at Alexander. In 1967, the Alexander School District became part of the Brandon School Division. The two-storey school was demolished sometime in the 1980s.

== Demographics ==
In the 2021 Census of Population conducted by Statistics Canada, Alexander had a population of 321 living in 119 of its 131 total private dwellings, a change of −3.9% from its 2016 population of 334. With a land area of 1.38 km^{2} (0.53 sq mi), it had a population density of 232.6/km^{2} (602.5/sq mi) in 2021.
