= Hartney =

Unincorporated community in Manitoba, Canada

- Unincorporated Urban Community
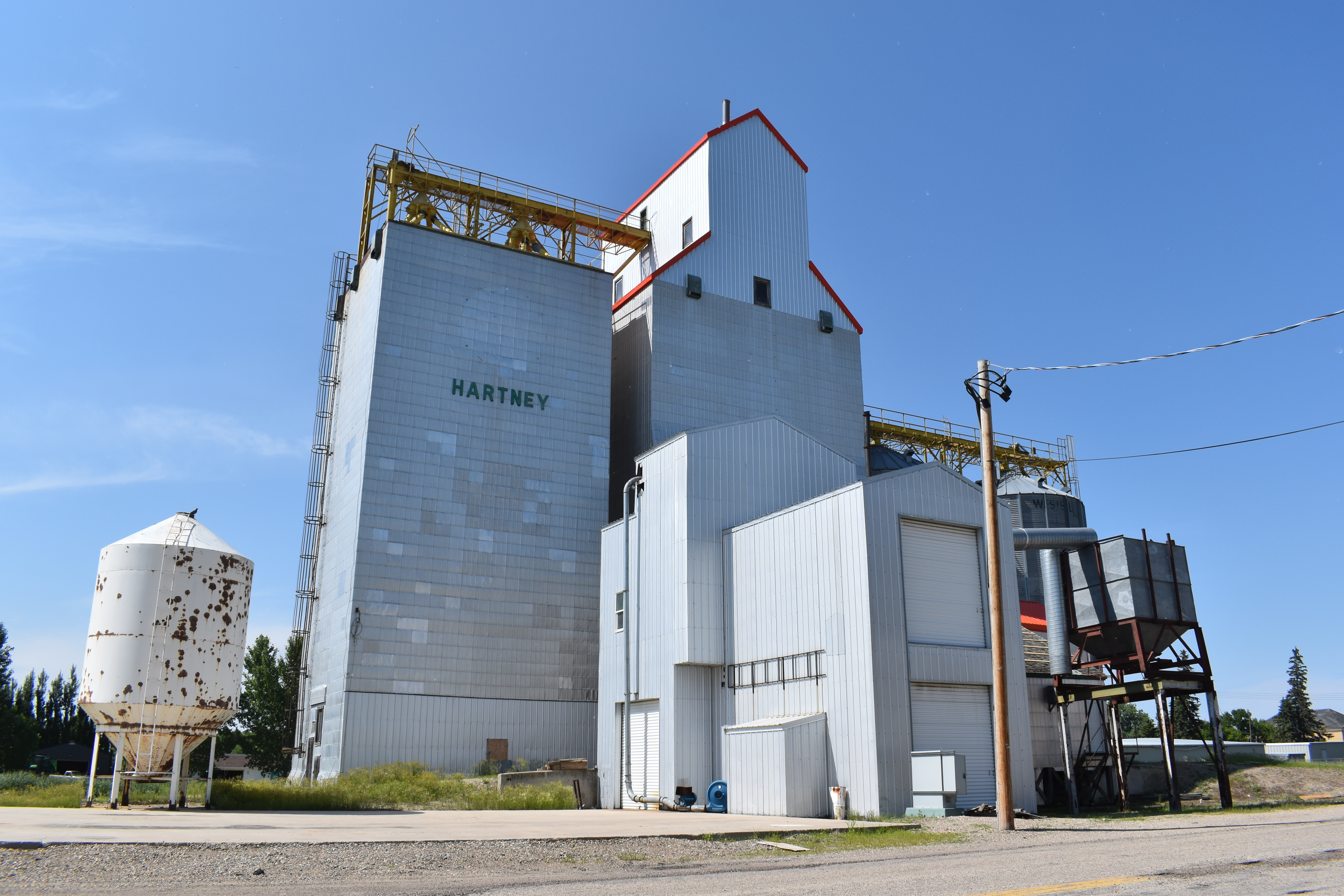
- Hartney's Grain Elevator

- Location of Hartney in Manitoba
- Coordinates: 49°28′51″N 100°31′21″W
- Rural Municipality: Grassland
- Established: 1882
- Incorporated: 1905
- Lost Incorporation: January 1, 2015

Government
  - MP (Brandon-Souris): Grant Jackson (CPC)
  - MLA: Doyle Piwniuk

Area
  - Total: 2.68 km^{2} (1.03 sq mi)

Population (2021 Census)
  - Total: 499
  - Density: 186.2/km^{2} (482/sq mi)

Hartney is an unincorporated urban community in the Municipality of Grassland within the Canadian province of Manitoba that held town status prior to January 1, 2015. It lies along the banks of the Souris River. Originally established in 1882, the community is named after James Harvey Hartney, an early postmaster in the district.

The Hollywood film The Lookout featuring Jeff Daniels and Joseph Gordon-Levitt, and the film The Stone Angel featuring Ellen Burstyn, were filmed in Hartney in 2006; taking advantage of such buildings as the community's grain elevator and museum.

Hartney's local Member of Legislative Assembly is Doyle Piwniuk and the Member of Parliament for the area is Brandon—Souris MP Grant Jackson.

Six kilometres west of Hartney are the Lauder Sand Hills.

== Demographics ==
In the 2021 Census of Population conducted by Statistics Canada, Hartney had a population of 499 living in 210 of its 231 total private dwellings, a change of 8% from its 2016 population of 462. With a land area of 2.68 km^{2} (1.03 sq mi), it had a population density of 186.2/km^{2} (482.2/sq mi) in 2021.

== Notable people ==
- Lew Morrison – NHL hockey player
- Corey Peloquin – professional wrestler best known as Chi Chi Cruz
- Reg Atkinson – former mayor of Hartney and Brandon
- Henry Champ - Canadian broadcaster with CTV, CBC and NBC News

== Gallery ==
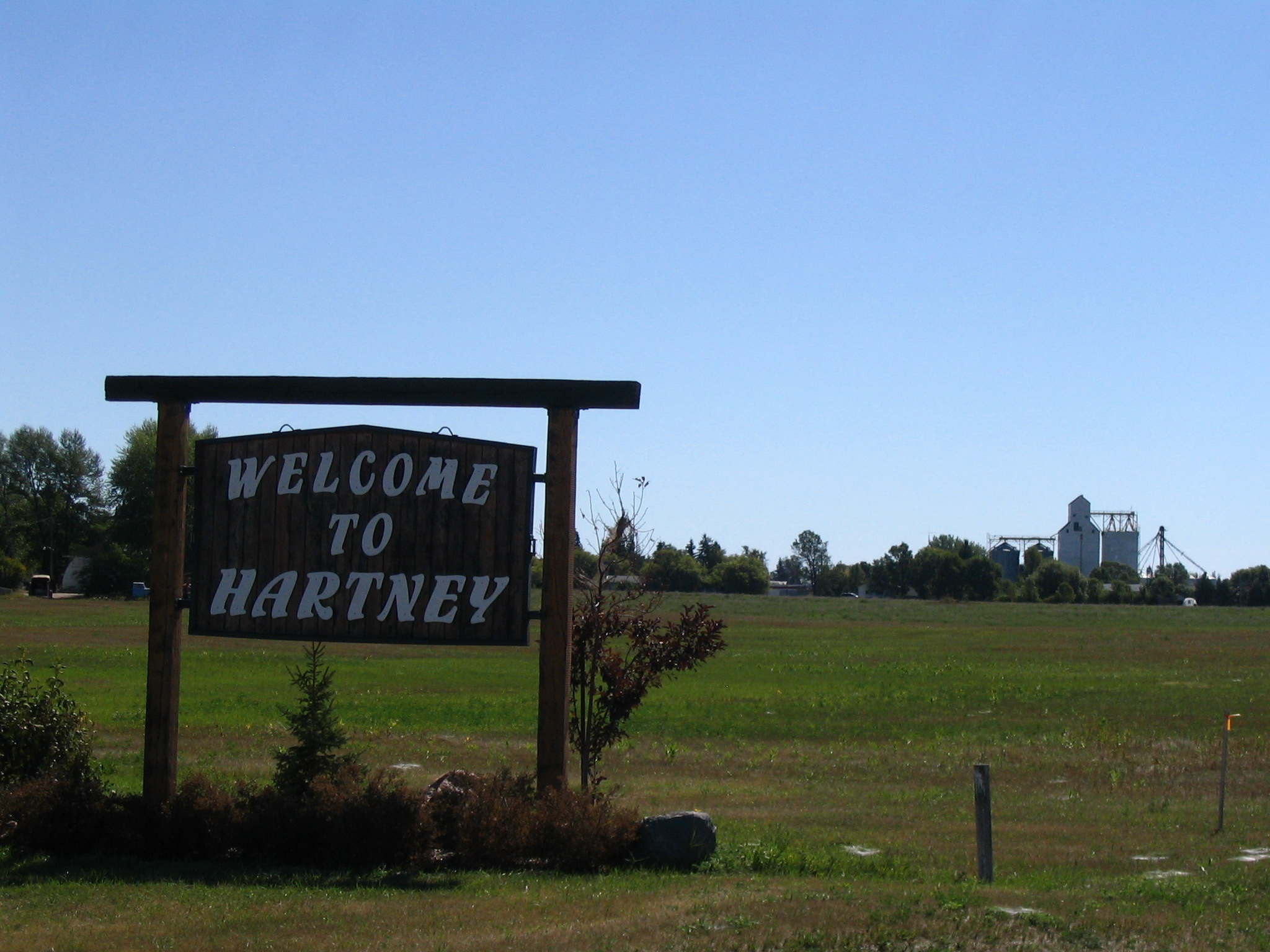
Welcome to Hartney

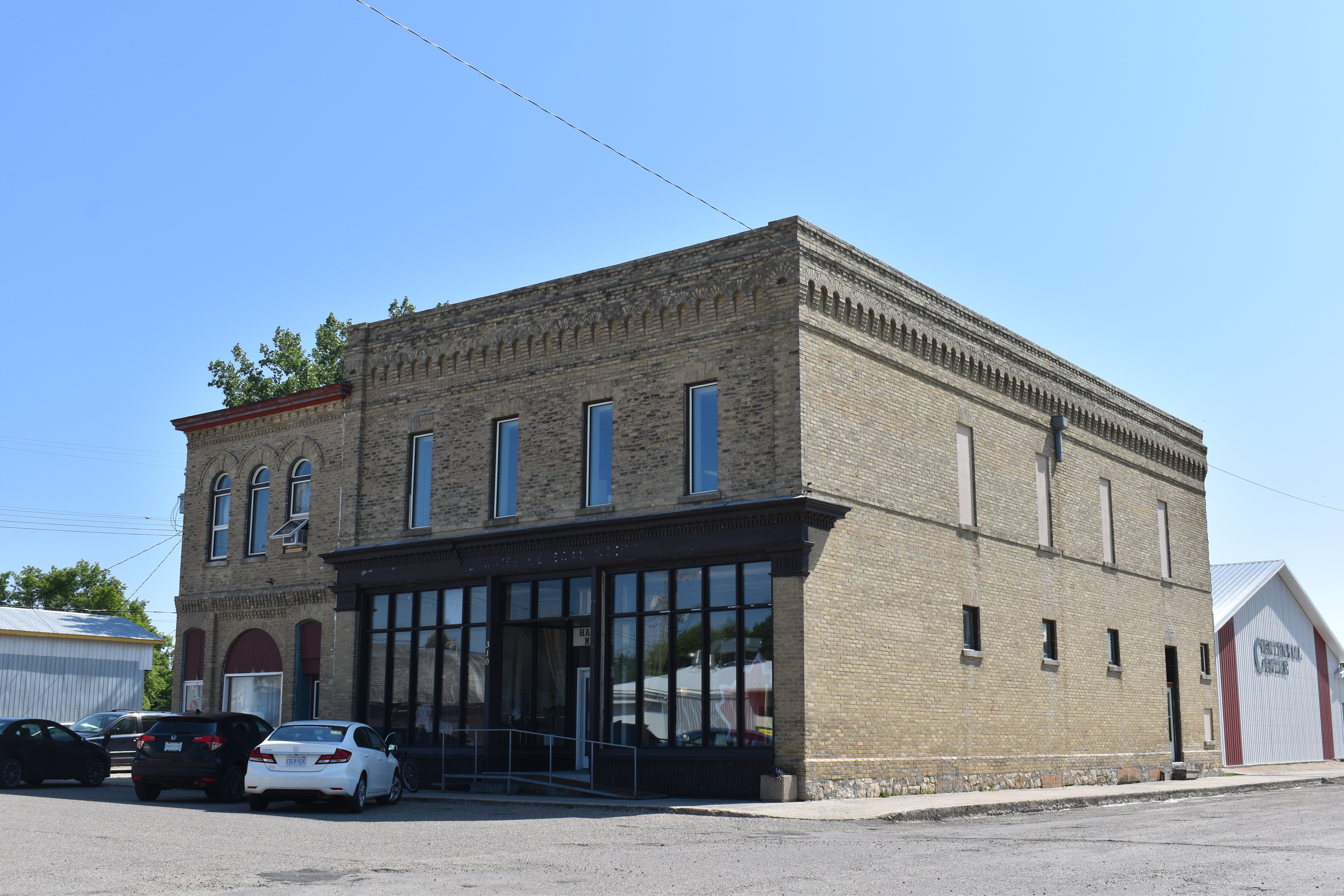
Hartney's museum

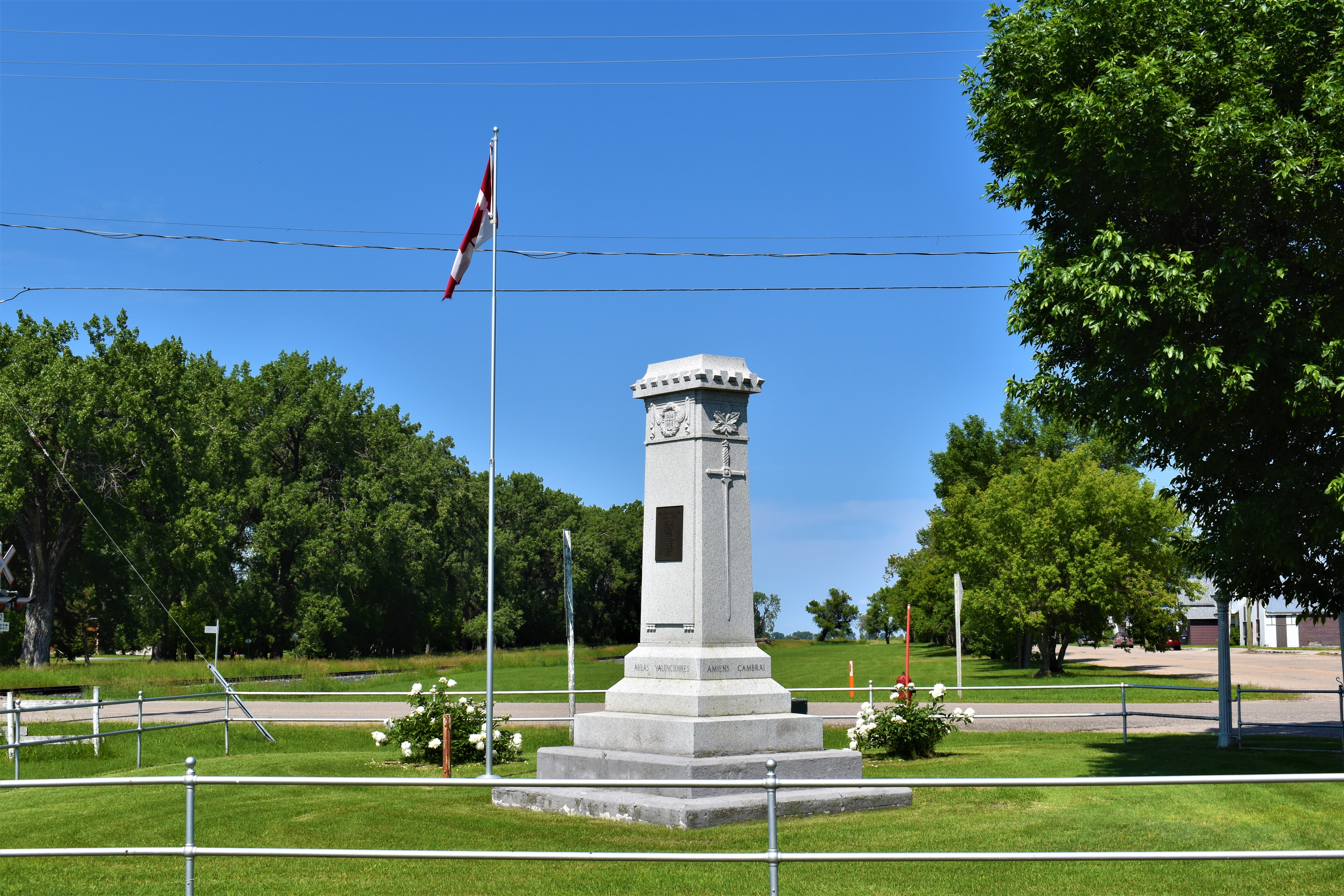
Hartney's war memorial
