= List of museums in Manitoba =

This is a list of museums in Manitoba, Canada. There are nearly 200 museums in Manitoba, with over 40 in the City of Winnipeg alone.

For this context, museums are defined as institutions (including nonprofit organizations, government entities, and private businesses) that collect and care for objects of cultural, artistic, scientific, or historical interest and make their collections or related exhibits available for public viewing. Also included are non-profit art galleries and university art galleries.

== Overview ==
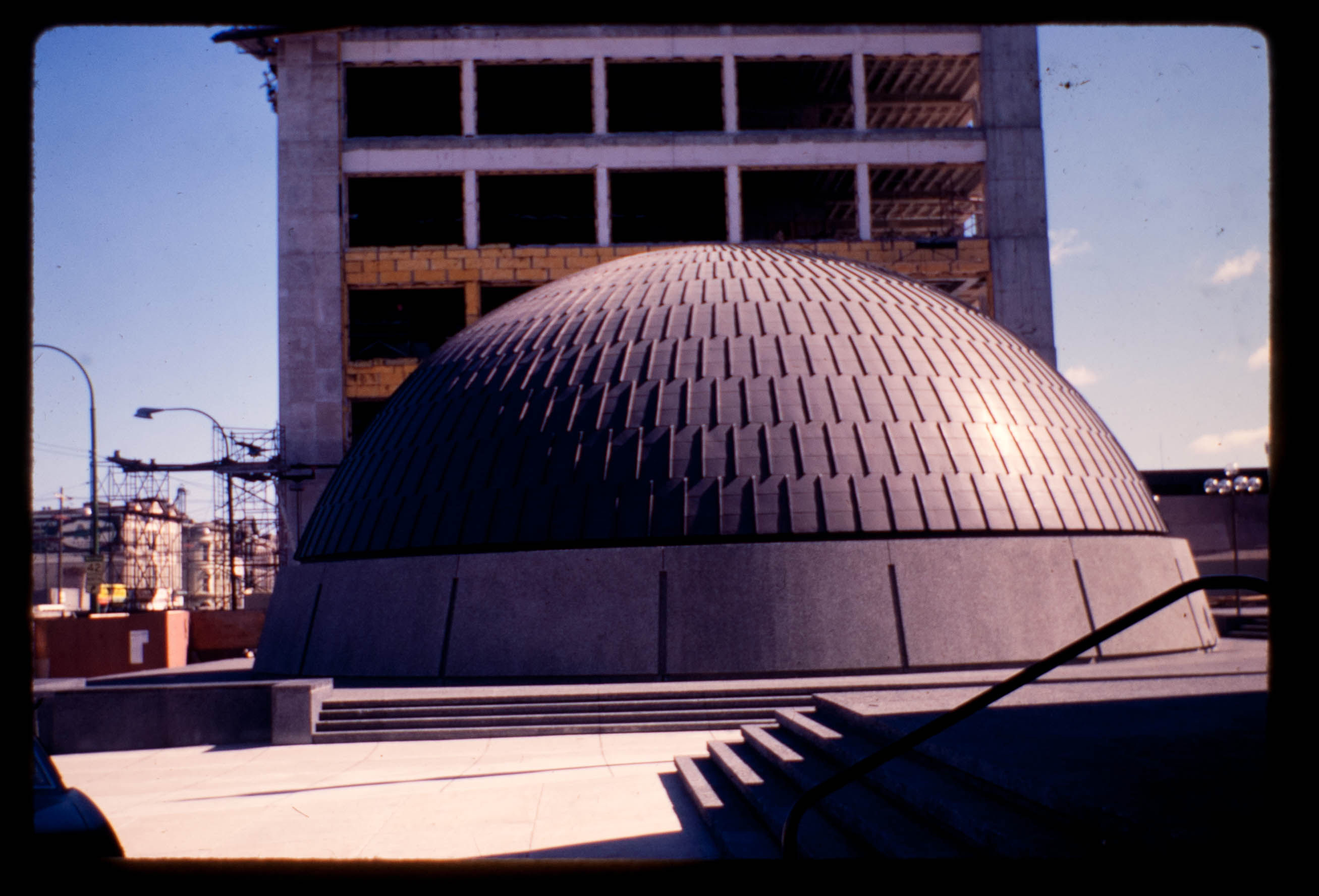
Manitoba Museum and Planetarium

Manitoba is home to nearly 200 museums with over 40 in Winnipeg alone. These include art galleries, community museums, cultural centres, heritage centres, nature centres, historic buildings, historic sites, parks, historical societies, natural history museums, science museums and zoos. Their focus includes art, history, science, nature, sports, leisure, transportation and industry. Manitoba museums are also essential to the province's tourism industry.

== Current museums ==
Name	Town/City	Regions	Type	Summary
12th Manitoba Dragoons Museum	Brandon	Westman	Regimental	history of the 26th Field Artillery Regiment, Royal Canadian Artillery
Air Force Heritage Museum and Air Park	Winnipeg	Winnipeg Capital	Aerospace / Military	museum open by appointment
Alex Robertson Museum	Alonsa	Parkland	Local history	
Anola & District Museum	Anola	Eastman	Open-air	pioneer village
Antler River Historical Society Museum	Melita	Westman	Local History	includes antique firearms and pioneer artifacts
Canadian Aquatic Hall of Fame	Winnipeg	Winnipeg Capital	Sports (water sports)	
Arborg Heritage Village	Arborg	Interlake	Local History	multicultural history of rural life and farm communities of the Interlake region prior to 1930
Art Gallery of Southwestern Manitoba	Brandon	Westman	Art	
Ashern Pioneer Museum	Ashern	Interlake	Open-air	historic buildings and agricultural equipment
Beautiful Plains Museum	Neepawa	Westman	Local history	period room and business displays
Beckoning Hills Museum	Boissevain	Westman	Local history	period room and business displays
Belmont & District Historical Museum	Belmont	Westman	Local history	open in summer
Binscarth & District Gordon Orr Memorial Museum	Binscarth	Parkland	Local history	Closed for the 2021 season but working to temporarily move online.
Birdtail Country Museum	Birtle	Westman	Local history	period room displays
Blacksmith Museum	Cartwright	Westman	Industry (blacksmith)	fully restored and working blacksmith shop
Brandon General Museum	Brandon	Westman	Local heritage	local history, schools, businesses, early entertainment and fashion, agriculture, includes the B.J. Hales Collection of bird and animal mounts, model railway layouts
Pioneer Village Museum	Beausejour	Eastman	Open-air	
Burrough of the Gleann Museum	Glenboro	Westman	Local history	heritage of the Glenboro-South Cypress area
Canadian Fossil Discovery Centre	Morden	Pembina Valley	Natural history	Marine reptile fossils
Canadian Museum for Human Rights	Winnipeg	Winnipeg Capital	Human rights / National	explores the subject of human rights including Aboriginal issues, the Holocaust, etc.
Carberry Plains Museum	Carberry	Westman	Local history	includes local memorabilia and paintings, sports memorabilia from all eras and many decade-specific collections
Charlebois Heritage Museum	The Pas	Northern	Local history	local history of the Charlebois Chapel. It is a municipally-designated heritage building.
Clack Family Heritage Museum	Rivers	Westman	History	antique automobiles, equipment and pioneer artifacts
Commonwealth Air Training Plan Museum	Brandon	Westman	Aerospace	World War II aircraft, British Commonwealth Air Training Plan, R.C.A.F.
Cooks Creek Heritage Museum	Cooks Creek	Eastman	Local heritage	local history of pioneer settlers from Eastern-European, Slavic countries and their cultural heritage
Crystal City Community Printing Museum	Crystal City	Westman	Technology	dedicated to printing presses and equipment
Dalnavert	Winnipeg	Winnipeg Capital	Historic house	Late-Victorian house
Daly House Museum	Brandon	Westman	Historic house	Late-19th century Victorian house
Darlingford School Heritage Museum	Darlingford	Pembina Valley	Local history	historic four-room schoolhouse with exhibits of local history
Dauphin Railway Museum	Dauphin	Parkland	Railway	located in a restored 1912 Canadian Northern Railway station
Dufferin Historical Museum	Carman	Pembina Valley	Local history	operated by the Dufferin Historical Society
Dunnottar Station Museum	Dunnottar	Interlake	Railway	
Ed Leith Cretaceous Menagerie	Winnipeg	Winnipeg Capital	Natural history	part of the University of Manitoba Department of Geological Sciences, skeletal replicas of animals from the Cretaceous period
Elgin & District Museum	Elgin	Westman	Local history	open in summer
Eriksdale Museum	Eriksdale	Interlake	Local history	includes creamery artifacts, housed in the only remaining creamery in Manitoba
Itsanitaq Museum	Churchill	Northern	Inuit	formerly the Eskimo Museum; includes Inuit sculptures, artifacts and carvings
Ethelbert & District Museum	Ethelbert	Parkland	Local history	includes a school room, pioneer kitchen, sewing room, nursery, bedroom and artifacts from original settlers
Evergreen Firearms Museum	Belmont	Westman	Military	military and sporting firearms
Fire Fighters Museum	Winnipeg	Winnipeg Capital	Firefighting	
Flin Flon Station Museum	Flin Flon	Northern	Local history	located in a former Canadian National Railway Station building; includes artifacts from the 1920s', collected from mining, transportation, and cultural sources
Fort Dauphin Museum	Dauphin	Parkland	Open-air	18th-century fur-trade post and pioneer village
Fort Garry Historical Society Museum	Winnipeg	Winnipeg Capital	Historic house	Two late-19th century houses (the Turenne and Bohémier homes) located in the historic St. Norbert Provincial Park; operated by the Fort Garry Historical Society
Fort Garry Horse Museum & Archives	Winnipeg	Winnipeg Capital	Regimental	history of The Fort Garry Horse, a regiment of the Canadian Forces, as well as of Winnipeg cavalry, 1878 to present
Fort Gibraltar	Winnipeg	Winnipeg Capital	Living	Summer living history demonstrations of 1815 fur-trading post life
Fort La Reine Museum	Portage la Prairie	Central Plains	Open-air	includes pioneer village, Allis-Chalmers Museum with farm equipment, Ukrainian Orthodox church, Military Museum, Manitoba Softball Hall of Fame
Foxwarren Museum	Foxwarren	Westman	Local history	operated by the Foxwarren Historical Society in the former St. George's Anglican Church
Gallery 1C03	Winnipeg	Winnipeg Capital	Art	gallery of the University of Winnipeg
Gilbert Plains Museum & Tourist Information Centre	Gilbert Plains	Parkland	Local history	
Gladstone District Museum	Gladstone	Central Plains	Local history	
Hamiota Pioneer Club Museum	Hamiota	Westman	History	
Hart-Cam Museum	Hartney	Westman	Local history	
Hecla-Grindstone Provincial Park	Riverton	Interlake	Open-air	includes a fishing industry museum, one-room school, 1920-1940s period Icelandic family house, tools
Heritage North Museum	Thompson	Northern	Local heritage	includes local natural and cultural history, mining, First Nation, fur-trade artifacts, and fossils
Heritage Park Museums	Cartwright	Westman	Multiple	consists of several museums and historic buildings in Heritage Park, including Todd's Shoe Repair Museum, Badger Creek Museum, Mount Prospect School Museum, old MTS Office Museum, old Mather Post Office Museum, and the Heritage House Museum.
Hillcrest Museum	Souris	Westman	Heritage	designated as a Municipal Heritage Site.
Historical Museum of St. James – Assiniboia	Winnipeg	Winnipeg Capital	Historic house	Late-19th century house, also local history, farming, agriculture and blacksmith exhibits
Horod School	Horod	Parkland	Education	designated as a Municipal Heritage Site.
Inglis Grain Elevators National Historic Site	Inglis	Parkland	Agriculture	development of Canada's prairie agriculture; designated national historic site
Irvin Goodon International Wildlife Museum	Boissevain	Westman	Natural history	collection of full-mount animals set in interactive, natural scenes
Ivan Franko Museum	Winnipeg	Winnipeg Capital	Biographical	dedicated to Ukrainian author and poet Ivan Franko
J.A.V David Museum	Killarney	Westman	Local heritage	features Indigenous and pioneer artifacts, war relics, photographs, cameras, maps, trophies, textiles, art, and a restored historic post office.
Jim's Vintage Garages	Headingley	Central Plains	Automotive	includes automotive and petroleum industry memorabilia; located in the Headingley Heritage Centre
Keeseekoowenin Ojibway First Nation Interpretive Centre	Wasagaming	Parkland	Indigenous heritage (Keeseekoowenin Ojibway FN)	recognized federal heritage building.
Kenosewun Visitor Centre and Museum	Lockport	Interlake	Archaeological	interprets the evolution of Aboriginal cultures in the Red River area, featuring excavated Aboriginal artifacts, history of the St. Andrews Locks and Dam; located in Lockport Provincial Park.
Keystone Pioneers Museum	Roblin	Parkland	Local heritage	features local history, agricultural equipment, restored Elaschuk House, a pioneer log cabin and the Makaroff United Church
Lac du Bonnet and District Historical Society	Lac du Bonnet	Eastman	Local history	
Le Musée de Saint-Boniface Museum	Winnipeg (St. Boniface)	Winnipeg Capital	Francophone and Métis heritage	Winnipeg's oldest building and a national historic site
Legion House Museum	Winnipeg	Winnipeg Capital	Military	features the 400-year military history in Manitoba; it is maintained by the Military History Society of Manitoba.
Living Prairie Museum	Winnipeg	Winnipeg Capital	Nature center	Nature center and prairie ecology
Lower Fort Garry National Historic Site	Lockport	Interlake	Living	1850s Hudson's Bay Company fur-trading post
Lundar Museum	Lundar	Interlake	Open-air	features a former CNR station, Mary Hill School, Notre Dame Church, two log houses, and a caboose and jigger, among other historic buildings, and agricultural items and antiques.
Lynn Lake Mining Town Museum	Lynn Lake	Northern	Mining	area nickel mining and local history
Maison Gabrielle Roy	Winnipeg	Winnipeg Capital	Historic house / Biographical	home of writer Gabrielle Roy
Manitoba & North-Western Model Railroad	Sandy Lake	Parkland	Historic site (railway)	
Manitoba Agricultural Museum	Austin	Central Plains	Agriculture	features vintage farm machinery and pioneer village buildings
Manitoba Amateur Radio Museum	Austin	Central Plains	Technology (radio)	features antique communication equipment; located on the grounds of the Manitoba Agricultural Museum. It is Canada's only amateur radio museum.
Manitoba Antique Automobile Museum	Elkhorn	Westman	Automobile	includes rare automobiles, pioneer farm equipment, steam tractors, and unique household artifacts
Manitoba Baseball Hall of Fame Museum	Morden	Pembina Valley	Sports (baseball)	
Manitoba Basketball Hall of Fame & Museum	Winnipeg	Winnipeg Capital	Sports (basketball)	located at the University of Winnipeg's Duckworth Centre
Manitoba Children's Museum	Winnipeg	Winnipeg Capital	Children's	
Manitoba Crafts Museum and Library	Winnipeg	Winnipeg Capital	Art	"the only museum in Canada devoted exclusively to craft and its current and historical importance to Canadians"
Manitoba Curling Hall of Fame & Museum	Winnipeg	Winnipeg Capital	Sports (curling)	
Manitoba Dairy Museum	St. Claude	Central Plains	Industry / Food & beverage (dairy)	features collection of artifacts related to the development of Manitoba's dairy industry; located on a complex that consists of several theme-related buildings including the Pioneer Museum, a country school, chapel museum, and other pioneer artifacts, and local history
Manitoba Electrical Museum & Education Centre	Winnipeg	Winnipeg Capital	Technology (electrical)	Electrical history of Manitoba
Manitoba Museum	Winnipeg	Winnipeg Capital	Human and natural history / Provincial	formerly the Museum of Man and Nature.
Manitoba Softball Hall of Fame & Museum	Winnipeg	Winnipeg Capital	Sports (softball)	
Manitoba Sports Hall of Fame and Museum	Winnipeg	Winnipeg Capital	Sports	Manitoba's sports teams and honoured athletes
Manitoba Transit Heritage Association	Winnipeg	Winnipeg Capital	Transport	The MTHA collection includes a vintage bus fleet and public transit records of Manitoba, as well as memorabilia from the Winnipeg Electric Company, Greater Winnipeg Transit Commission, Metro Transit and Winnipeg Transit. The museum collections are typically showcased at various venues over the summer months.
Manitoba World War One Museum, Archives and Library	Pilot Mound	Central	War / Living	
Margaret Laurence House	Neepawa	Westman	Historic house / Biographical	childhood home of author Margaret Laurence
Marine Museum of Manitoba	Selkirk	Interlake	Maritime	includes several museum ships
Marringhurst Heritage House	Pilot Mound	Westman	Historic house	turn-of-the century farmhouse; designated municipal heritage site.
Marion and Ed Vickar Jewish Museum of Western Canada	Winnipeg	Winnipeg Capital	Ethnic heritage (Jewish)	features Jewish history of settlement in western Canada; hosted in the Jewish Heritage Centre
Mennonite Heritage Village	Steinbach	Eastman	Open-air	dedicated to Russian Mennonite history
Miami Railway Station Museum	Miami	Pembina Valley	Railway	national historic site
Miami Museum	Miami	Pembina Valley	Historic House/Local History	Former Anglican church and schoolhouse, containing artifacts surrounding local history, as well as a display of a 40 ft Mosasaur fossil
Midwinter School Heritage Site	East Braintree	Eastman	Historic school	
Miniota Municipal Museum	Miniota	Westman	Historic house	includes two houses consisting of over 1200 different artifacts from all periods
Minnedosa District Museum and Heritage Village	Minnedosa	Westman	Open-air	a pioneer village featuring 9 restored heritage buildings
Moncur Gallery	Boissevain	Westman	Archaeological (First Nations)	features Aboriginal history in the Turtle Mountain region, primarily from artifacts from the private collection of Bill Moncur
Monseigneur-Taché Historic Site	Sainte-Geneviève	Eastman	Historic site / Francophone heritage	focused on the French-Canadian religious and local heritage from the time of the colonization of western Canada to 1980.
Moosehorn Heritage Museum	Grahamdale	Interlake	History	information, information
Morris & District Centennial Museum	Morris	Westman	Local heritage	pioneer life in the Red River Valley area
Musée St. Pierre-Jolys Museum	St-Pierre-Jolys	Eastman	Francophone heritage	focuses on local pioneer life of the early 20th century; a provincial historic site
Musee des Pionniers et des Chanoinesses	Notre Dame de Lourdes	Central Plains	Local history	dedicated to local history and the Chanoisses, better known as Les Soeurs du Sauveur
Musée St-Joseph Museum	Montcalm	Pembina Valley	Open-air / Community	
Naval Museum of Manitoba	Winnipeg	Winnipeg Capital	Military / Maritime	
Nellie McClung Heritage Site	Manitou	Central	Historic house / Biographical	includes the only two homes of Nellie McClung in Canada that are open to the public: Hazel Cottage and McClung House
Neubergthal Heritage Foundation	Neubergthal	Central	Open-air	Neubergthal is "the best-preserved single-street Mennonite village in North America."
New Iceland Heritage Museum	Gimli	Interlake	Ethnic heritage (Iceland)	History and artifacts of the settlers from Iceland; three locations in Gimli
Oak Lake and District Museum	Oak Lake	Westman	History	information, information, local history
Ogniwo Polish Museum	Winnipeg	Winnipeg Capital	Ethnic heritage (Polish)	
Parks Canada Visitor Centre	Churchill	Northern	Visitor center / History	includes exhibits about the area's fur-trade industry and nearby Prince of Wales Fort National Historic Site and York Factory National Historic Site, military history, human and natural history, Wapusk National Park
Pavilion Gallery Museum	Winnipeg	Winnipeg Capital	Art	Pavilion located in Assiniboine Park
Pembina Threshermen's Museum	Winkler	Pembina Valley	Open-air	heritage buildings, vintage farm equipment, antiques
Pilot Mound & District Museum	Pilot Mound	Central	History	Local history
Pioneer Village	Pilot Mound	Central	Living	recreates a small rural Manitoba community in the early 1900s
Plug In Institute Of Contemporary Art (Plug In ICA)	Winnipeg	Winnipeg Capital	Art (contemporary)	
Plum Coulee Prairie View Elevator Museum	Plum Coulee	Pembina Valley	Agricultural	features grain elevator with displays depicting pioneer life
Plum Museum & Visitor Centre	Souris	Westman	Local history	formerly the Plum Heritage Church Museum & Tea Room
Pinewood Museum	Wasagaming	Parkland	Local history	
Prairie Dog Central Railway	Winnipeg	Winnipeg Capital	Railway / Living	owned by The Vintage Locomotive Society
Prairie Mountain Regional Museums	Shoal Lake	Westman	Open-air	includes several historic buildings and the collection of the former Cleggs Museum of Horse Drawn Vehicles
Queen's Own Cameron Highlanders of Canada Museum	Winnipeg	Winnipeg Capital	Military	
Rapid City Museum	Rapid City	Westman	Local history	local history
Royal Canadian Artillery Museum (RCA Museum)	CFB Shilo	Westman	Military / Artillery	as the central museum for the Royal Regiment of Canadian Artillery, it is Canada's national artillery museum; located near Brandon.
Reston & District Museum	Reston	Westman	Local history	
Riel House	Winnipeg	Winnipeg Capital	Historic house	1880s-period home of Métis leader and founder of Manitoba, Louis Riel
Riverton Transportation & Heritage Center	Riverton	Interlake	Transport / Local history	features local history as affected by area transportation: rail, boat, air, roads
Roland 4-H Museum	Roland	Pembina Valley	Agriculture	dedicated to the history of 4-H Canada, the museum occupies a nearly 120-year-old former bank
Ross House Museum	Winnipeg	Winnipeg Capital	Historic house	1850s-period homestead
Rossburn Museum	Rossburn	Parkland	Local history	includes replica Ukrainian village, artifacts, agricultural tools, etc.
Royal Aviation Museum of Western Canada	Winnipeg	Winnipeg Capital	Aerospace / Military	dedicated to military and civilian aircraft; formerly the Western Canada Aviation Museum
Royal Winnipeg Rifles Museum & Archives	Winnipeg	Winnipeg Capital	Regimental	official museum of the Royal Winnipeg Rifles
Sagkeeng Cultural Centre Museum	Fort Alexander	Eastman	Ethnic heritage (Sagkeeng FN)	
Saint-Claude Gaol Museum & Tourist Office	St. Claude	Central Plains	Prison	
Saint Léon Interpretive Centre	St. Leon	Westman	Interpretive centre	includes interactive galleries focusing on such things as wind power (wind farms), birds, and sustainable living; known in French as Centre d'interprétation St-Léon.
Sam Waller Museum	The Pas	Northern	Local history	Collections include First Nations, fur trading, mining, transportation
Sandilands Forest Centre	Hadashville	Eastman	Forestry	website, forest ecology and biodiversity, sustainable forest management, fire management and prevention, trees and tree growth, the forest industry and forest products
Sandy Lake Ukrainian Cultural Heritage Museum	Sandy Lake	Westman	Ethnic heritage (Ukrainian)	features artifacts from the original Riding Mountain settlement of 1899
Satterthwaite Log Cabin / Burrows Trail	McCreary	Parkland	Historic site	Burrows Trail was the stagecoach route in the late 1880s and sits adjacent to the Satterthwaite Log Cabin, which is a designated municipal heritage site
School of Art Gallery (SOAG)	Winnipeg	Winnipeg Capital	Art	University of Manitoba’s School of Art Gallery, formerly known as Gallery One One One
Selo Ukraina (Ukrainian Village)	Dauphin	Parkland	Living	A Ukrainian heritage village (selo) depicting a pioneer crossroads settlement between 1896 and 1925. It is the site of major events like Canada's National Ukrainian Festival and Dauphin's Countryfest.
Settlers, Rails & Trails	Argyle	Interlake	Regional	includes the Canadian flag collection, as well as local history, agricultural, school, religious and railway history
Seton Centre	Carberry	Westman	Biographical	a small museum, art gallery, and gift shop dedicated to the life and works of Ernest Thompson Seton
Seven Oaks House Museum	Winnipeg	Winnipeg Capital	Historic house	Mid-19th century settlement life
Shoal Lake Mounted Police Museum	Shoal Lake	Westman	Police	designated as the province's official Mounted Police museum, dedicated to the North-West Mounted Police.
Sipiweske Museum	Wawanesa	Westman	Local history	exhibits various memorabilia from pioneers, Wawanesa Insurance Co., the Criddle Family, and Nellie McClung. The site includes two provincial heritage buildings.
Snow Lake Mining Town Museum	Snow Lake	Northern	Mining	also known as the Manitoba Star Attraction Mining Museum
Somerset Lorne Citizens Museum	Somerset	Central	Rock and gem	
Sprague & District Historical Museum	Sprague	Eastman	Open-air	local history, period room and business displays
St. Andrews Heritage Centre	St. Andrews	Interlake	Local history	
St. Elijah Pioneer Museum	Lennard	Parkland	Local history	website, historic Romanian Orthodox church and pioneer home with artifacts; also known as St. Elijah Romanian Orthodox Church Museum and Paulencu Romanian Folk House
St. Vital Museum	Winnipeg (St. Vital)	Winnipeg Capital	Community	operated by the St. Vital Historical Society
St. Volodymyr Museum	Winnipeg	Winnipeg Capital	Ethnic heritage (Ukrainian)	focused on Ukrainian Catholic heritage; operated by the Ukrainian Catholic Archeparchy of Winnipeg
Star Mound School Museum	Snowflake	Westman	School	one-room schoolhouse; includes First-Nations artifacts
Strathclair Museum	Strathclair	Westman	Local history	
Swan Valley Historical Museum	Swan River	Parkland	Open-air	museum and pioneer village including over 20 historic buildings, focusing on the Swan River Valley
Teulon and District Museum	Teulon	Interlake	Open-air	historic buildings, agriculture equipment, household items and antiques
Third Crossing Agricultural Museum	Gladstone	Central Plains	Agriculture	information
Tolstoi Heritage Centre	Tolstoi	Eastman	Local heritage	
Transcona Museum	Winnipeg	Winnipeg Capital	Community	History and culture of Transcona and the surrounding Springfield area
Treherne Museum	Treherne	Central Plains	History	includes period business displays, rifles, antique furniture, radios, tools, kitchenware, war paraphernalia, Native artifacts, agriculture equipment, farm machinery, blacksmith shop
Trembowla Cross of Freedom Museum	Dauphin	Parkland	Open-air	tribute to Ukrainian settlers, includes 1989 St. Michael's Ukrainian Catholic Church, a pioneer home, Trembowla school and other historic buildings. It is a provincial and national heritage site.
Turtle Mountain Flywheel Club Museum	Killarney	Westman	Agriculture	tractors, farm equipment, tools
Ukrainian Cultural and Educational Centre (Oseredok)	Winnipeg	Winnipeg Capital	Ethnic heritage (Ukrainian)	Also known as Oseredok
Ukrainian Museum of Canada, Manitoba Branch	Winnipeg	Winnipeg Capital	Ethnic heritage (Ukrainian)	Ukrainian folk art and crafts, located in the Holy Trinity Ukrainian Orthodox Metropolitan Cathedral
Virden Pioneer Home Museum	Virden	Westman	Historic house	Victorian-period home; the site also includes a post office, general store, schoolhouse displays, memorabilia of pioneer life, World War I artifacts and uniforms, folk-art gallery
Waskada Museum	Waskada	Westman	Local heritage	the complex includes 6 buildings, 5 of which are original structures, as well as farm artifacts, antique vehicles, period business, and school displays
Wasyl Negrych Homestead	Gilbert Plains	Parkland	Open-air / Historic site	Ukrainian pioneer homestead and outbuildings
Watson Crossley Community Museum	Grandview	Parkland	Local history	pioneer home, log cabin, agriculture equipment, schoolhouse
Whitemouth Municipal Museum	Whitemouth	Eastman	Open-air	pioneer village and farming museum; open seasonally
Whiteshell Provincial Park	West Hawk Lake	Eastman	Multiple	includes the Whiteshell Natural History Museum, Whiteshell Trappers Museum, West Hawk Museum, Whiteshell Fish Hatchery Interpretive Centre, Alf Hole Goose Sanctuary, and Interpretive Centre
Willow Plain School Municipal Heritage Site	Sarto	Eastman	School	1911 one-room school
Winkler Heritage Museum	Winkler	Central	Local heritage	
Winnipeg Art Gallery	Winnipeg	Winnipeg Capital	Art	
Winnipeg Police Museum	Winnipeg	Winnipeg Capital	Police	
Winnipeg Railway Museum	Winnipeg	Winnipeg Capital	Railway	
Winnipeg River Heritage Museum	St. Georges	Eastman	History	formerly St. Georges Museum
Winnipegosis Museum	Winnipegosis	Parkland	History	information, local history
Woodlands Pioneer Museum	Woodlands	Interlake	History	information, information, local history, household items, also includes 2 schools, log cabin and St. Luke's Anglican Church

== Digital museums and collections ==
These are museums or collections that either exist only in cyberspace (i.e., virtual museums) or are virtual exhibitions provided by physical museums through their website. This does not include museums in Manitoba that have temporarily made their exhibits available online due to COVID-19 restrictions in 2020/2021.

Name	Owner	Type	Details
A Museum Called Manitoba	Association of Manitoba Museums	Provincial history	exhibit of 150 artifacts, for Manitoba's 150th anniversary
Art Gallery of Southwestern Manitoba		Contemporary art	founded as the Brandon Art Club
Brandon General Museum and Archives			
Brandon Mental Health Centre Museum		History	formerly a physical museum
CMHR – Explore from Home	Canadian Museum for Human Rights		includes video tours
Manitobia	University of Manitoba Libraries	Provincial heritage	digital collections
PastForward	Winnipeg Public Library	Winnipeg history	

== Defunct museums ==
Name	Town/City	Type	Closed	Details
Archibald Historical Museum	La Rivière	History	2016	Included home of activist Nellie McClung
Brandon Mental Health Centre Museum	Brandon	History		now virtual only
Canadian Orthodox Pioneer Museum	Sifton	History	2010	located in the Holy Resurrection Russian Orthodox Church which was destroyed by fire in 2010
Chatfield Park of Souvenirs Museum	Armstrong		2012	
Chokecherry Junction	Boissevain	Railroad		model railway collection
Cleggs Museum of Horse Drawn Vehicles	Miniota	Transport	2010	horse-drawn vehicles and antiques; collection moved to the Prairie Mountain Regional Museums
Costume Museum of Canada	Winnipeg	Fashion		
Leaf Rapids National Exhibition Centre	Leaf Rapids	Multiple		included human, natural, scientific and artistic heritage of Canada
Manitoba Military Aviation Museum	Winnipeg	Military / aerospace	2014 Jan	
Captain William Kennedy House	Winnipeg	Historic house	2015	former home of Captain William Kennedy
Philip's Magical Paradise	Giroux	Magic	2018	magic and illusion equipment and history
Red River Valley Floods Interpretive Centre	Ste. Agathe	Interpretation centre		campground/RV park with history of the 1950 and 1997 Red River flood

== See also ==
- Manitoba Historical Society
- Archives of Manitoba
- Nature centres in Manitoba
- Canadian Museums Association
- International Council of Museums
