= Manitoba Provincial Road 355 =

Provincial road in Manitoba, Canada

Provincial Road 355
- PR 355 highlighted in red

Route information
- Maintained by Department of Infrastructure
- Length: 98.2 km (61.0 mi)
- Existed: 1966–present

Major junctions
- West end: Birdtail Sioux First Nation
- PTH 83 near Beulah PTH 21 near Lavinia PTH 10 / PTH 16 (TCH) / YH in Minnedosa
- East end: PTH 16A (Main Street) in Minnedosa

Location
- Country: Canada
- Province: Manitoba
- Rural municipalities: Hamiota; Minto – Odanah; Oakview; Prairie View
- Towns: Minnedosa

Highway system
- Provincial highways in Manitoba; Winnipeg City Routes
← PR 354	→ PR 357

Provincial Road 355 (PR 355) is a 98.2-kilometre-long (61.0 mi) east-west highway in the Westman Region of the Canadian province of Manitoba.

== Route description ==
PR 355 begins at the east boundary of the Birdtail Sioux First Nation, and terminates at PTH 16A in Minnedosa.

From Birdtail Sioux First Nation, it travels 8 kilometres (5.0 mi) before it intersects PTH 83 just north of Beulah. From PTH 83, PR 355 continues east for 32 kilometres (20 mi), passing through the communities of Isabella (where it meets southbound PR 474), Decker (where it intersects PR 264), and Lavinia. Approximately 5 kilometres (3.1 mi) east of Lavinia, the road meets PTH 21. PTH 21 and PR 355 continue in concurrence south for 3 kilometres (1.9 mi) before PR 355 leaves the concurrence and continues east, travelling 13 kilometres (8.1 mi) to meet southbound PR 354. The two roads run in concurrence for 2 kilometres (1.2 mi) before PR 354 turns north and leaves the concurrence. PR 355 continues for 12 kilometres (7.5 mi) to meet southbound PR 250, passing the village of Cardale about midway in between. The two roads also run in concurrence for 2 kilometres (1.2 mi) before PR 250 also turns north and leaves the concurrence. From the end of this second concurrence, the road continues east for 13 kilometres (8.1 mi) to an intersection with PR 270 near the unincorporated community of Cadurcis. From PR 270, the road continues east for 12 kilometres (7.5 mi) to meet PTH 10 and 16 just west of Minnedosa. PR 355 continues east for 3 kilometres (1.9 mi) into Minnedosa, reaching its eastbound terminus with PTH 16A in the town's north end.

PR 355 is known as 6th Avenue N.W. within Minnedosa's town limits.

The route is gravel for most its length, with paved sections between its western terminus and PTH 83, between Cardale and the junction with northbound PR 250, along with the section between its eastbound terminus to approximately 3 kilometres (1.9 mi) west of the PTH 10/16 junction and the concurrence it shares with PTH 21.

== History ==
The western terminus of PR 355 was extended to the Birdtail Sioux First Nation in 2004. Prior to this, the road's westbound terminus was at PTH 83, making the original length 90 kilometres (56 mi).

== Major intersections ==
Division	Location	km	mi	Destinations	Notes
Prairie View	Birdtail Sioux First Nation	0.0	0.0	Road 86N	End of provincial maintenance; western terminus
Prairie View		8.2	5.1	PTH 83 – Birtle, Miniota	Western end of unpaved section
Prairie View	Isabella	19.7	12.2	PR 474 south – Isabella, Arrow River; Road 148W – Solsgirth	Northern terminus of PR 474
Prairie View	Isabella	20.1	12.5	Second Street – Isabella	
Prairie View / Hamiota boundary	Decker	26.3	16.3	PR 264 – Kelloe, Crandall	Former PR 254
Hamiota		34.5	21.4	Road 139W – Lavinia	
Hamiota		39.5	24.5	PTH 21 north – Shoal Lake; Road 86N – McConnell	Western end of PTH 21 concurrency; eastern end of unpaved section
Hamiota		42.7	26.5	PTH 21 south – Hamiota	Eastern end of PTH 21 concurrency; western end of unpaved section
Hamiota		47.6	29.6	Road 133W / Road 134W – McConnell	Former PR 470
Oakview		55.7	34.6	PR 354 south – Oak River	Western end of PR 354 concurrency
Oakview	Brumlie	57.5	35.7	PR 354 north – Strathclair	Eastern end of PR 354 concurrency
Oakview	Cardale	62.5	38.8	First Street – Cardale	Eastern end of unpaved section
Oakview	Cardale	62.7	39.0	Main Street – Cardale	
Oakview		68.9	42.8	PR 250 south – Rivers	Western end of PR 250 concurrency
Oakview		70.7	43.9	PR 250 north – Newdale	Eastern end of PR 250 concurrency; western end of unpaved section
Oakview	Cadurcis	83.6	51.9	PR 270 – Basswood, Rapid City	
Minto-Odanah	No major junctions				
Town of Minnedosa		94.8	58.9	PTH 16 (TCH) / PTH 10 / YH (John Bracken Highway) – Dauphin, Brandon	Eastern end of unpaved section
Town of Minnedosa		98.2	61.0	PTH 16A (Main Street N)	Eastern terminus
1.000 mi = 1.609 km; 1.000 km = 0.621 mi: Concurrency terminus
