= Manitoba Highway 24 =

Highway in Manitoba

Provincial Trunk Highway 24
- PTH 24 highlighted in red

Route information
- Maintained by Department of Infrastructure
- Length: 82 km (51 mi)
- Existed: 1956–present

Major junctions
- West end: PTH 83 at Miniota
- PTH 21 near Hamiota
- East end: PTH 10 / PR 262 at Tremaine

Location
- Country: Canada
- Province: Manitoba
- Rural municipalities: Hamiota; Oakview; Prairie View

Highway system
- Provincial highways in Manitoba; Winnipeg City Routes
← PTH 23	→ PTH 25

Provincial Trunk Highway 24 (PTH 24) is a provincial highway in the Canadian province of Manitoba. It is an east–west route that runs from PTH 83 near Miniota, east through Oak River and Rapid City to the junction of PTH 10 and PR 262 between Brandon and Minnedosa.

== Route description ==
PTH 24 begins in the Rural Municipality of Prairie View at a junction with PTH 83 on the south side of Miniota. The highway heads east for the next several kilometers, crossing a small stream and a railroad line as it travels through the community of Arrow River, having an intersection with PR 474 shortly thereafter. It travels along the south side of Crandall, where it has a junction with PR 264, before crossing into the Rural Municipality of Hamiota.

PTH 24 travels past several small lakes and ponds on its way to Parks Corner, where it crosses PTH 21 just a few kilometers south of the town of Hamiota. The highway now enters the Rural Municipality of Oakview and almost immediately travels through the town Oak River, where it runs concurrent (overlapped) with PR 354 and crosses the Oak River. It continues due east for several kilometers, traveling through rural farmland, where it has an intersection with PR 250, before suddenly curving southward as it becomes concurrent with PR 270 and enters Rapid City. The highway passes through a neighborhood and crosses a bridge over the Little Saskatchewan River, with PTH 24 splitting off shortly thereafter and following 2nd Avenue eastward along the north side of downtown. PTH 24 passes through several more neighborhoods before leaving Rapid City and heading east for a few kilometers, coming to an end at an intersection with PTH 10 (John Bracken Highway) at Tremaine, with the road continuing east as PR 262.

The entire length of Manitoba Highway 24 is a rural, paved, two-lane highway.

== History ==
The original PTH 24 went from PTH 22 (redesignated as PTH 83 in 1953) near Melita to the Saskatchewan boundary near Gainsborough. In 1949, this became part of PTH 3.

PTH 24 was designated to its current location in 1956. Prior to 1956, the route, known as PTH 27, started at PTH 10 at Tremaine and travelled west to Rapid City. From Rapid City, the highway turned north and terminated at PTH 16, then known as PTH 4, east of Basswood. The north–south section of the old PTH 27 was decommissioned and redesignated as part of PR 270 in 1966.

When PTH 24 was first added in 1956, the highway's western terminus was PTH 21 south of Hamiota, making the original length of the highway 51 kilometres (32 mi). It was extended to its current length in 1957.

== Major intersections ==
Division	Location	km	mi	Destinations	Notes
Prairie View	Miniota	0	0.0	PTH 83 – Birtle, Virden	
Prairie View		9	5.6	Bridge over the Arrow River	
Prairie View		10	6.2	Road 150W – Arrow River	
Prairie View	Quadra	13	8.1	PR 474 north – Isabella	
Prairie View		18	11	PR 264 north – Crandall	former PR 254
Hamiota		31	19	PTH 21 – Hamiota, Griswold	
Oakview		43	27	PR 354 south – Bradwardine	west end of PR 354 overlap
Oakview	Oak River	45	28	PR 354 north – Strathclair	east end of PR 354 overlap
Oakview		46	29	Bridge over the Oak River	
Oakview		58	36	PR 250 – Newdale, Rivers	
Oakview		73	45	PR 270 north – Basswood	west end of PR 270 overlap; overlap turns south towards Rapid City; former PTH 27 north
Oakview	Rapid City	75	47	Bridge over the Little Saskatchewan River	
Oakview	Rapid City	75	47	PR 270 south (5th Street) to PTH 1 (TCH)	east end of PR 270 overlap PTH 24 turns east
Oakview	Tremaine	82	51	PTH 10 (John Bracken Highway) / PR 262 north – Minnedosa, Brandon	
1.000 mi = 1.609 km; 1.000 km = 0.621 mi: Concurrency terminus

== Related route ==
Provincial Road 474
- Road 148W
- Location: Arrow River - Isabella
- Length: 15.9 km (9.9 mi)
- Existed: 1966–present

Provincial Road 474 (PR 474) is a 15.9-kilometre-long (9.9 mi) north–south spur of PTH 24 in the Prairie View Municipality, connecting the hamlets of Arrow River and Isabella. It is entirely a two-lane gravel highway.

PR 474 begins just east of Arrow River at an intersection with PTH 24 at the locality of Quadra, heading north to cross the Arrow River and traverse a switchback. It travels through rural farmland for several kilometres before entering Isabella, travelling along the hamlet's western side before the highway comes to an end at an intersection with PR 355.

Prior to 1992, it continued north a further 28.8 kilometres (17.9 mi) via Road 148W, Road 90N, Road 150W, and what is now PR 472 to Solsgirth, where it ended at an intersection with the Yellowhead Highway (PTH 16).

Division	Location	km	mi	Destinations	Notes
Prairie View	Quadra	0.0	0.0	PTH 24 – Rapid City, Miniota	Southern terminus; road continues south as Road 148W
Prairie View		0.3	0.19	Bridge over the Arrow River	
Prairie View	Isabella	15.5	9.6	Railway Avenue – Isabella	
Prairie View	Isabella	15.6	9.7	First Street W – Isabella	
Prairie View	Isabella	15.9	9.9	PR 355 – Beulah, Decker; Road 148W – Solsgirth	Northern terminus; road continues north as Road 148W (former PR 474 north)
1.000 mi = 1.609 km; 1.000 km = 0.621 mi
