= Rural Municipality of Miniota =

Canadian administrative district (1883–2014)

Coordinates: 50°11′47″N 100°58′45″W

The Rural Municipality of Miniota is a former rural municipality (RM) in the Canadian province of Manitoba. It was originally incorporated as a rural municipality on December 22, 1883. It ceased on January 1, 2015 as a result of its provincially mandated amalgamation with the RM of Birtle and the Town of Birtle to form the Prairie View Municipality.

The former RM of Miniota is located on the Assiniboine River and encompassed the separately administered Birdtail Sioux First Nation.

The 2011 Canadian census, the last one performed while the RM of Miniota existed, showed a population of 871, the lowest recorded in its history; the peak population had been 2,593 in the 1921 Canadian census. The declining population directly resulted in the RM of Miniota ceasing as an RM, as the 2015 amalgamation formed 47 new administrative units by merging the 107 Manitoba rural municipalities that had populations lower than 1,000 each.

== Communities ==
- Arrow River
- Beulah
- Crandall
- Isabella
- Miniota
- Quadra
- Reeder
- Uno
