= KC Adams =

Canadian artist

- Born: March 28, 1971 (age 55); Yorkton, Saskatchewan, Canada
- Citizenship: Fisher River Cree Nation, Canada
- Education: Concordia University
- Known for: Photography, installation art, multimedia art
- Website: www.kcadams.net

KC Adams (born March 28, 1971) is a Cree, Ojibway, and British artist and educator based in Winnipeg, Manitoba.

Adams is a full-time practicing artist specializing in many mediums such as digital photography, sculpture, painting, video, installation, public art, performance, beading, birch bark biting, leather work and quill work.

She is known for creating artwork that draws inspiration from popular culture and science fiction to deal with contemporary social issues. Her work addresses racism, colonization, human impact on land and the challenges and perceptions of Indigenous people. She reflects on the relationships between ancestral knowledge, memory, and the sacredness of water. Using a variety of media, including copper, clay and "birch bark technology", the work is a visual reminder of the knowledge bundles (traditional teachings) that are passed on to the next generation of life givers and water protectors.

Adams considers herself a social-practice artist through the way her practice uses audience interaction to bring attention to socio-political issues.

== Artwork ==
Besides working with more traditional forms of art, Adams has an interest in computers and new media technologies.

Her first public art commission, entitled Community, hangs above the lobby of the United Way building in Winnipeg. The works consists of a large, web-like ceramic and clay structure and was unveiled in 2014. In 2018, Adams collaborated with artists Val Vint and Jamie Isaac on a Niimaamaa, a 30' public art sculpture at The Forks. Adams' public sculpture Friendship was installed near the Canadian Museum for Human Rights in 2021.

Work from her Cyborg Hybrid series shows Euro-Aboriginal artists following the doctrine of the Cyborg Manifesto.

Her exhibition Perception is a pointed political statement aimed at challenging deeply ingrained stigmas and prejudices against First Nations peoples. The exhibition, shown in various galleries, bus shelters, and billboards in Winnipeg, featured two side-by-side portraits of members of the city's indigenous community. The portrait on the left showed the subject captioned with a racial slur, while the portrait on the right showed the same subject with their real name, occupation, interests and passions. In 2019, Perception was turned into a book published by Portage & Main press and was chosen for the Canadian Children’s Book Centre's Best Books for Children and Teens list.

Adams' artwork has been exhibited at the McMichael Canadian Art Collection, the Museum of Contemporary Canadian Art in Toronto, PHOTOQUAI: Biennale des images du monde in Paris, France, Carleton University Art Gallery, Winnipeg Art Gallery, Art Gallery of Southwestern Manitoba, OBORO Gallery, Urban Shaman Contemporary Aboriginal Art Gallery, and Gallery One One One and FitzGerald Study Centre at the University of Winnipeg.

== Career ==
Adams obtained her BFA from Concordia University in 1998.

She served as director of the Urban Shaman Gallery in Winnipeg, and has worked at Plug In Institute of Contemporary Art. She served as president of the board of directors of Ace Art, and was on the arts advisory panel for the Manitoba Arts Council.

She is an art educator, working with inner-city schools to teach art through Royal Conservatory of Music’s Learning Through the Arts and Manitoba Artists in the Schools.

She was the set designer for the Royal Winnipeg Ballet's Going Home Star: Truth and Reconciliation in 2014.

Adams has participated in residencies at the Banff Centre, the Confederation Art Centre in Charlottetown, the National Museum of the American Indian and the Parramatta Arts Gallery in Australia.

== Collections ==
Adams' work is in public and private permanent collections nationally and internationally. Work from Cyborg Hybrid and Perception are in the permanent collection of the National Gallery of Canada in Ottawa. Ten prints from her Circuit City series are in the Indian and Inuit Art Centre in Ottawa, Ontario. Birch Bark Ltd. is in the collection of the Canadian consulate of Sydney, Australia and the Dunlop Art Gallery. Cyborg Hybrid KC, Cyborg Hybrid Niki, Power Peyote Stitch, and iPad is Cree Floral are in the collection of the MacKenzie Art Gallery.

== Books ==
Adams wrote the book Perception: A Photo Series, which "Quill & Quire" named among the 2019 Books of the Year.

== Awards ==
Adams has received numerous grants and awards from the Winnipeg Arts Council, Manitoba Arts Council, and Canada Council for the Arts. In 2015, she won the Winnipeg Arts Council Making A Mark Award. In 2017, she received the Aboriginal Circle of Educators Trailblazer Award and the Senate 150 Medal presented by Senator Patricia Bovey.
