= Bill Derlago =

Canadian ice hockey player (born 1958)

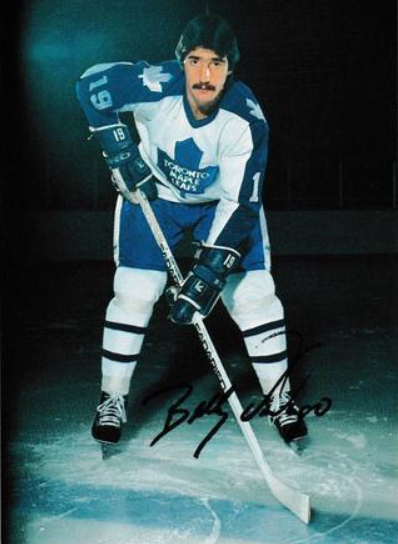
- Born: August 25, 1958 (age 67) Birtle, Manitoba, Canada
- Height: 5 ft 10 in (178 cm)
- Weight: 195 lb (88 kg; 13 st 13 lb)
- Position: Centre
- Shot: Left
- Played for: Vancouver Canucks; Toronto Maple Leafs; Boston Bruins; Winnipeg Jets; Quebec Nordiques
- NHL draft: 4th overall, 1978; Vancouver Canucks
- Playing career: 1978–1987

William Anthony Derlago (born August 25, 1958) is a Canadian former professional ice hockey player. He played in the National Hockey League from 1978 to 1987 with the Vancouver Canucks, Toronto Maple Leafs, Boston Bruins, Winnipeg Jets and Quebec Nordiques. Derlago was born in Birtle, Manitoba, but grew up in Beulah, Manitoba.

== Career ==
Growing up, Derlago excelled at multiple sports, including golf, tennis, baseball, and hockey. He achieved best success with ice hockey, playing with the Brandon Wheat Kings and setting a number of WCJHL records. He was selected fourth overall by the Vancouver Canucks in the 1978 NHL entry draft.

As a rookie with the Canucks in 1978–79, Derlago badly injured his knee and was limited to just nine games, though he did score eight points. Though he played well in Vancouver, he was unable to live up to team expectations, and was traded to Toronto along with Rick Vaive for Tiger Williams and Jerry Butler on February 18, 1980.

On October 11, 1985, Derlago was traded to the Boston Bruins for Tom Fergus. In Boston, he played as a defensive forward on the third and fourth line. After only 39 games in Boston he was again traded, this time to the Winnipeg Jets in exchange for Wade Campbell. In the later stages of his career Derlago was sent to the Quebec Nordiques in 1987. Finally, Derlago was relegated to the Fredericton Express of the American Hockey League. Derlago spent one additional season in Switzerland before announcing his retirement in 1988.

Derlago currently resides in Concord, Ontario, and operates a Chrysler dealership.

== Career statistics ==
			Regular season					Playoffs
Season	Team	League	GP	G	A	Pts	PIM	GP	G	A	Pts	PIM
1974–75	Brandon Travellers	MJHL	45	38	21	59	87	—	—	—	—	—
1974–75	Brandon Wheat Kings	WCHL	17	0	4	4	2	5	1	1	2	0
1975–76	Brandon Wheat Kings	WCHL	68	49	54	103	43	5	3	3	6	0
1976–77	Brandon Wheat Kings	WCHL	72	96	82	178	63	16	14	16	30	31
1977–78	Brandon Wheat Kings	WCHL	52	89	63	152	105	8	9	13	22	10
1978–79	Dallas Black Hawks	CHL	11	5	8	13	9	—	—	—	—	—
1978–79	Vancouver Canucks	NHL	9	4	4	8	2	—	—	—	—	—
1979–80	Vancouver Canucks	NHL	54	11	15	26	27	—	—	—	—	—
1979–80	Toronto Maple Leafs	NHL	23	5	12	17	13	3	0	0	0	4
1980–81	Toronto Maple Leafs	NHL	80	35	39	74	26	3	1	0	1	2
1981–82	Toronto Maple Leafs	NHL	75	34	50	84	42	—	—	—	—	—
1982–83	Toronto Maple Leafs	NHL	58	13	24	37	27	4	3	0	3	2
1983–84	Toronto Maple Leafs	NHL	79	40	20	60	50	—	—	—	—	—
1984–85	Toronto Maple Leafs	NHL	62	31	31	62	21	—	—	—	—	—
1985–86	Toronto Maple Leafs	NHL	1	0	0	0	0	—	—	—	—	—
1985–86	Boston Bruins	NHL	39	5	16	21	15	—	—	—	—	—
1985–86	Winnipeg Jets	NHL	27	5	5	10	6	3	1	0	1	0
1986–87	Winnipeg Jets	NHL	18	3	5	8	6	—	—	—	—	—
1986–87	Quebec Nordiques	NHL	30	3	6	9	12	—	—	—	—	—
1986–87	Fredericton Express	AHL	16	7	8	15	2	—	—	—	—	—
1987–88	HC Ambrì–Piotta	NDA	16	14	8	22	22	—	—	—	—	—
NHL totals			555	189	227	416	247	13	5	0	5	8

== Awards and achievements ==
- 1977: WCHL Scoring Champion
- 1977: WCHL First All-Star Team
- 1977: WCHL Goals Leader
- 1978: WCHL Goals Leader
- 1978: WCHL Second All-Star Team
- "Honoured Member" of the Manitoba Hockey Hall of Fame

Preceded by Jere Gillis	Vancouver Canucks first-round draft pick 1978	Succeeded by Rick Vaive
