= Reeder, Manitoba =

Reeder
- Location of Reeder in Manitoba
- Coordinates: 50°6′25″N 101°8′53″W
- Country: Canada
- Province: Manitoba
- Region: Westman Region
- Census Division: No. 15

Government
  - Governing Body: Prairie View Municipality
  - MP: Dan Mazier
  - MLA: Greg Nesbitt
- Time zone: UTC−6 (CST)
  - Summer (DST): UTC−5 (CDT)
- Area code: 204
- NTS Map: 062K03
- GNBC Code: GAWUH

Reeder is an unincorporated community in southwestern Manitoba, Canada. It is located approximately 9 kilometers (6 miles) southwest of Miniota, Manitoba in Prairie View Municipality.
