= Birtle Indian Residential School =

Defunct Canadian residential school

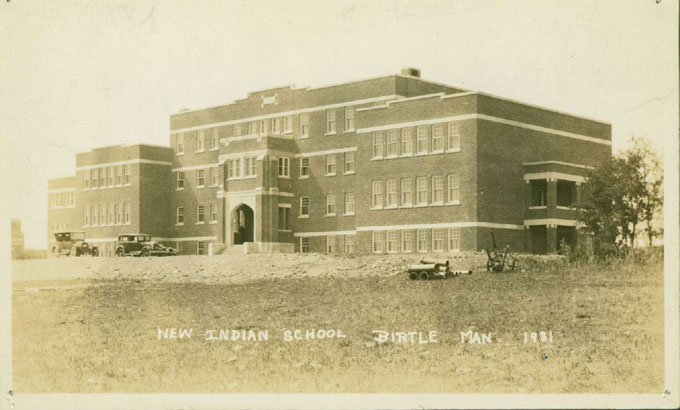
- Birtle Indian Residential School (1931)

Location
- Birtle, Manitoba; 50°25′55.1″N 101°02′30.6″W

Information
- Religious affiliation: Presbyterian
- Established: 1888
- Closed: 1970

The Birtle Indian Residential School was a school within the Canadian Indian residential school system that operated in Birtle, Manitoba from 1888 to 1970. Operated by the Presbyterian Church in Canada, attendance during the school's operation ranged from 19 to 170 students.

== School conditions ==
An analysis of the school's water in 1941 indicated high levels of colon bacilli, an indication of fecal contamination, leading to the discovery that the school's chlorination system had stopped working. In 1950 an equipment leak led to the shut down of the school's hot-water supply resulting in students having to carry buckets of boiling water from the basement's boiler to bathtubs in order to bathe. Water quality was again identified as an issue at the school as part of a federal report that rated the quality of the water from the kitchen tap as "dangerous". Beyond water issues, the school also had several structural issues. In 1949 R.A. Hoey, Indian Affairs' superintendent of Welfare and Training determined that the foundation of the school building erected in 1931 was sinking and had large cracks and that no funds had been available for repairs. In a 1967 brief drafted by the National Association of Principals and Administrators of Indian Residences school principal N.M. Rusaw wrote that the funds required to repair the steps of the main school building, which he called "a pedestrian hazard" had gone unapproved for four years.

The school operated with a focus on farming and vocational skills development with half of their school day dedicated to related training. Male students were required to take on farming and construction work, while female students were assigned domestic duties like cleaning, cooking, and sewing. Students like Sam Ross, whose story was documented in the Summary of the Final Report of the Truth and Reconciliation Commission of Canada, complained about the amount of labour they were expected to perform in addition to their studies years after the half-day system had been retired in the early 1950s. After running away from the school in 1959, Ross told Indian Affairs J.R. Bell that he had to work in the barn from "6:00 a.m. and 7:00 a.m. and from 8:00 a.m. to 9:00 a.m. again at recess, from 4:00 p. m. to 6:00 p.m. and had had to stoke up the furnace with coal at 10:00 o'clock before retiring."

== School building and grounds ==
The former school building gained attention in 2015 when the owner posted the property for sale on Kijiji after local real estate agents refused to list it. The buyers purchased the school not realizing it has been a residential school. Representing one of fourteen former residential school sites in Manitoba, the National Trust for Canada designated the school building, which was at the time one of only three residential school buildings still standing in the province, as 'endangered'.

In June 2021, following the discovery of unmarked graves on the grounds of the Kamloops Indian Residential School the Chief of the Birdtail Sioux First Nation, Lindsay Bunn, said he would like to see the grounds searched. University of Saskatchewan assistant professor in anthropology, Terence Clark, pointed to the private ownership of former residential school sites as a potential barrier to similar searches as researchers require permission to access the grounds.

== Principals ==
- G. G. McLaren (1889-1894)
- Neil Gilmour (1895)
- W. J. Small (1896-1901)
- W. McWhinney (1902)
- E. H. Crawford (1903-1905)
- W. W. McLaren (1905-1913)
- David Iverach (1913-1916)
- Mrs. S. Marshall (1916-1921)
- Rev. F. E. Pitts (1922-1927)
- Rev. H. B. Currie (1927-1933)
- Rev. E. H. Lockhart (1933-1941)
- Mr. Albert E. Candy (1941-1942)
- Roy Webb (1942-1945)
- Norman Martin Rusaw (1945-1970)
