= Rural Municipality of Birtle =

Canadian administrative district (1883–2014)

Coordinates: 50°27′42″N 100°59′32″W

The Rural Municipality of Birtle was a rural municipality (RM) in the Canadian province of Manitoba. It was originally incorporated as a rural municipality on December 22, 1883. It ceased on January 1, 2015, as a result of its provincially mandated amalgamation with the RM of Miniota and the Town of Birtle (an enclave of the RM of Birtle) to form the Prairie View Municipality.

In 1891, the Birtle subdistrict had a population of 846. The 2011 Canadian census, the last one performed while the RM of Birtle existed, showed a population of 632, the lowest recorded in its history; the peak population had been 2,031 in the 1931 Canadian census. The declining population directly resulted in the RM of Birtle ceasing as an RM, as the 2015 amalgamation formed 47 new administrative units by merging the 107 Manitoba rural municipalities that had populations lower than 1,000 each.

== Communities ==
- Foxwarren
- Solsgirth
