= Ross House Museum =

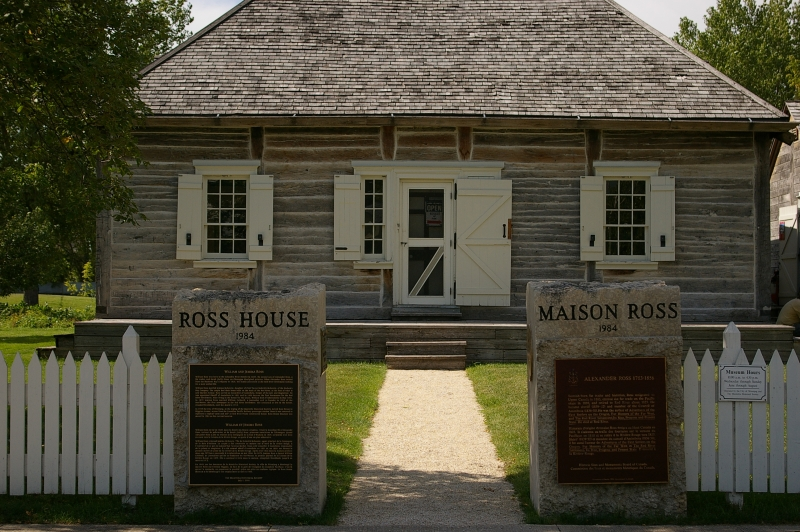
- Established: 1854; 172 years ago (Post Office); 1947; 79 years ago (Museum); 1980; 46 years ago (Heritage site)
- Location: 140 Meade Street N Winnipeg, Manitoba, R2W 3K4; Canada
- Coordinates: 49.9070°N 97.1297°W
- Type: Historic house museum
- Curator: Tracey Turner
- Public transit access: 45 Talbot
- Website: www.rosshousemuseum.ca

The Ross House Museum is a museum located in Winnipeg, Manitoba, Canada, housed in a log house (constructed 1852–55) that was designated a Winnipeg Landmark Heritage Structure in 1980.

The museum is affiliated with CMA, CHIN, and the Virtual Museum of Canada.

== History ==
Originally standing on the bank of the Red River at the foot of what is now Market Avenue, the building became the first post office in Western Canada with the appointment of William Ross (Métis) as postmaster by the Council of Assiniboia in 1855. The building was saved from demolition in 1947 by the Manitoba Historical Society and moved to Higgins Ave across from the C.P.R. station. There it was restored, with the land and house featuring artifacts, monuments and markers relevant to the early history of Manitoba. In 1984 the house was once more moved, this time to its present location in Joe Zuken Heritage Park in Point Douglas.

Soil samples were conducted in 2011 at the site. Results were positive for "significant toxins in the soil".

Ross House Museum received more than $31,000 (2015) in funding from the City of Winnipeg. However, under Mayor Bowman, these and other grants to civic museums were being reviewed.

In 2018 operation of the Museum was given to the Seven Oaks House Museum from the Manitoba Historical Society. The MHS had cited lack of government funding and security issues as reasons for handing over responsibilities to another organization.

== See also ==
- North Point Douglas
- Log building
