= St. Norbert Provincial Park =

Provincial park in Manitoba, Canada

- IUCN category V (protected landscape/seascape)
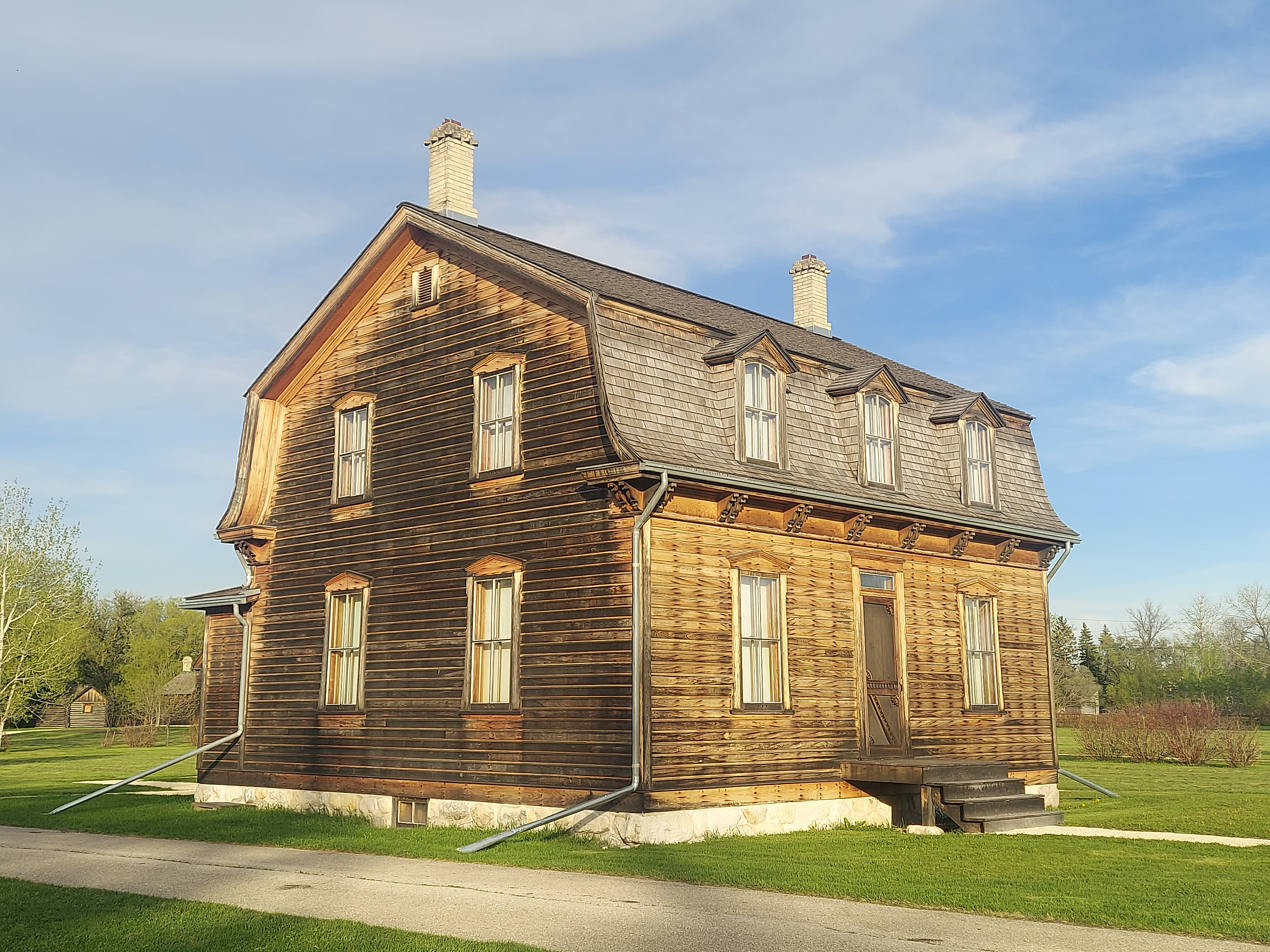
- Bohémier House

- Location within Manitoba
- Interactive map of St. Norbert Provincial Park
- Location: Manitoba, Canada
- Nearest city: Winnipeg, Manitoba
- Coordinates: 49°45′17″N 97°8′32″W
- Area: .07 km^{2} (0.027 sq mi)
- Established: 1976
- Governing body: Government of Manitoba

St. Norbert Provincial Park (French: Parc provincial du patrimoine de Saint-Norbert) is a park in the St. Norbert area of Winnipeg, Manitoba, Canada. The park is 66,200 square metres (16.4 acres) in size. It is located on the confluence of the La Salle River and the Red River, south of St. Norbert, and east of Highway 75.

Designated a provincial park by the Government of Manitoba in 1976, to preserve Turenne House and Bohémier House that were otherwise going to be demolished in the area. Since its creation several historical buildings from the Winnipeg area have been moved to the park for display and preservation. It is considered to be a Class V protected area under the IUCN protected area management categories. The park is a preserve of riparian woodlands indicative of the pre World War I and landscape of the area. There is a 1 kilometre (0.62 mi) self guided interpretive trail and picnic area with a view of the Red River Floodway gate.

== History ==
The mouth of the La Salle River has been inhabited potentially since 6000 BC. Archaeology done on the area have discovered an arrow head that was radioactively dated to 780AD and the area participated in extensive trade networks that reached as far as the Gulf of Mexico. From 1600 to 1800 the Indigenous groups of the Assiniboine, Cree, Ojibwe, and potentially more inhabited the area. During the fur trade period the mouth of the La Salle River was a popular stopping spot.

The area was likely inhabited by Métis settlers as early as 1882. The Hudson Bay Company census of 1985 lists 72 heads of families around the mouth of the La Salle River and in 1836 the area was surveyed according to the river lot system with the modern park boundaries being located on lots 78 and 79.

In 1971 the Fort Garry Historical Society was looking for a space to move Turenne House and Bohémier House to prevent their demolition. The land was bought from architect Herbert Henry Gatenby Moody by the Government of Manitoba in 1972 with the intention of making a park that was officially created in 1976.

== Features ==
=== Henderson House ===
Henderson House is the oldest surveying house from North Kildonan and one of the oldest houses in Winnipeg with its construction likely being in the second half of 1850s. Samuel Robert Henderson, a wealthy farmer, had the house built in the then popular red river frame style. It was originally constructed on Henderson's river lot in North Kildonan next to the current intersection of Henderson Highway and Knowles Avenue. In 1977 the then owner of the house donated the house to the city in return for a tax break. The city then decided to move the house to St. Norbert Provincial Park in 1979 on a flatbed truck. Restoration was never done on the building and its condition is slowly deteriorating.

=== Bohémier House ===
The Bohémier House was built in 1890 by Benjamin Bohemier, his wife Marie-Louise and their family, 1.5 km north of the St. Norbert Parish on River lots 104 and 105. It was inhabited by their decedents for 84 years. In 1973 it was to be demolished to make way for an apartment building and was rescued by the Fort Gary Historical Society and moved to the park. The house was open in 1985 for the public to tour the house furnished with contemporary artifacts. Its interior was fully renovated from 2012 to 2015 at the cost of $250 000. When the Fort Garry Historical Society dissolved in 2016 the house and all of the furnishings were donated to the province.

=== Outdoor Refrigerator ===
An example of an outdoor refrigerator is located next to Bohémier House. The fridge has a compartment above the storage area where a large insulated block of ice would be held, cooling the contents below it. The refrigerator was donated to the park in 1995 by the John Kennedy family.

=== Turenne House ===
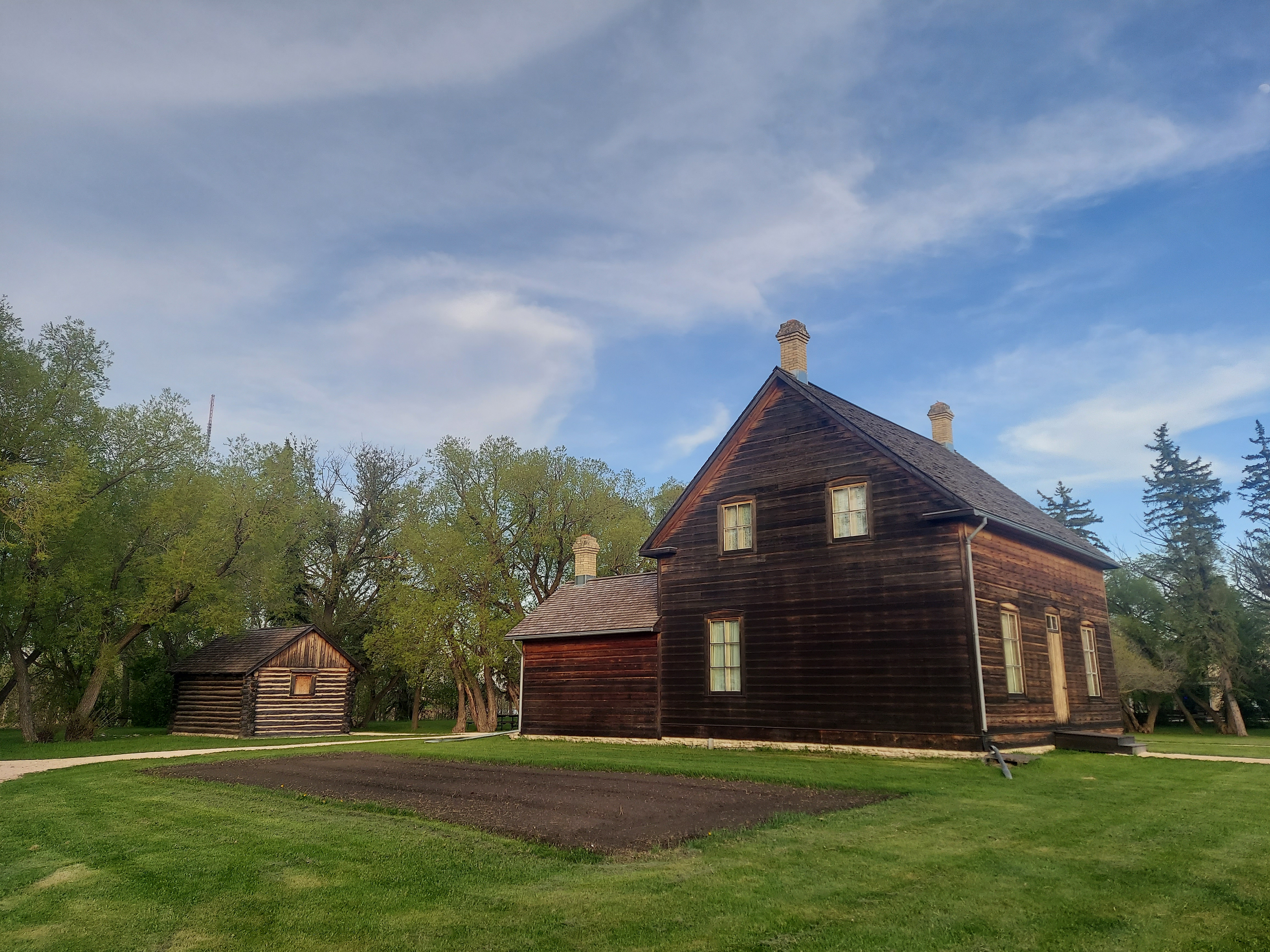
Turenne House with garden and neighbouring shed

A log house constructed on river lot 81, which was located next to the lot reserved for the St. Norbert Parish. Built by Joseph Turenne who was a Québec professional recruited by the Roman Catholic clergy to hold public office in Manitoba shortly after its entry into Confederation.

After the family moved to St. Boniface in 1882, newcomers to St. Norbert often rented the house from the parish priest. Among these were the Benjamin Bohémier family who would build the Bohémier House. The house was occupied until 1971 and underwent restoration that was completed in 1986.

=== Delorme House ===
The one and a half story building used red river frame construction which involved having horizontal beams braced between vertical beams, with mud, fur, and straw packed between them. It was Pierre Delorme's house which was built on the west side of the river by the bridge of St. Adolphe around 1854. The house was built on lot 21 as he settled in the region with his wife Adélaïde Millet dit Beauchemin and their 13 children. Delorme lived in Ottawa during his time as a Member of Parlement but returned to the Delorme House until 1881 when the family moved from the west bank of the Red River to the east bank. After his return from Ottawa he established a way station for travellers of the Pembina Trail between Fort Garry and St. Paul, Minnesota.

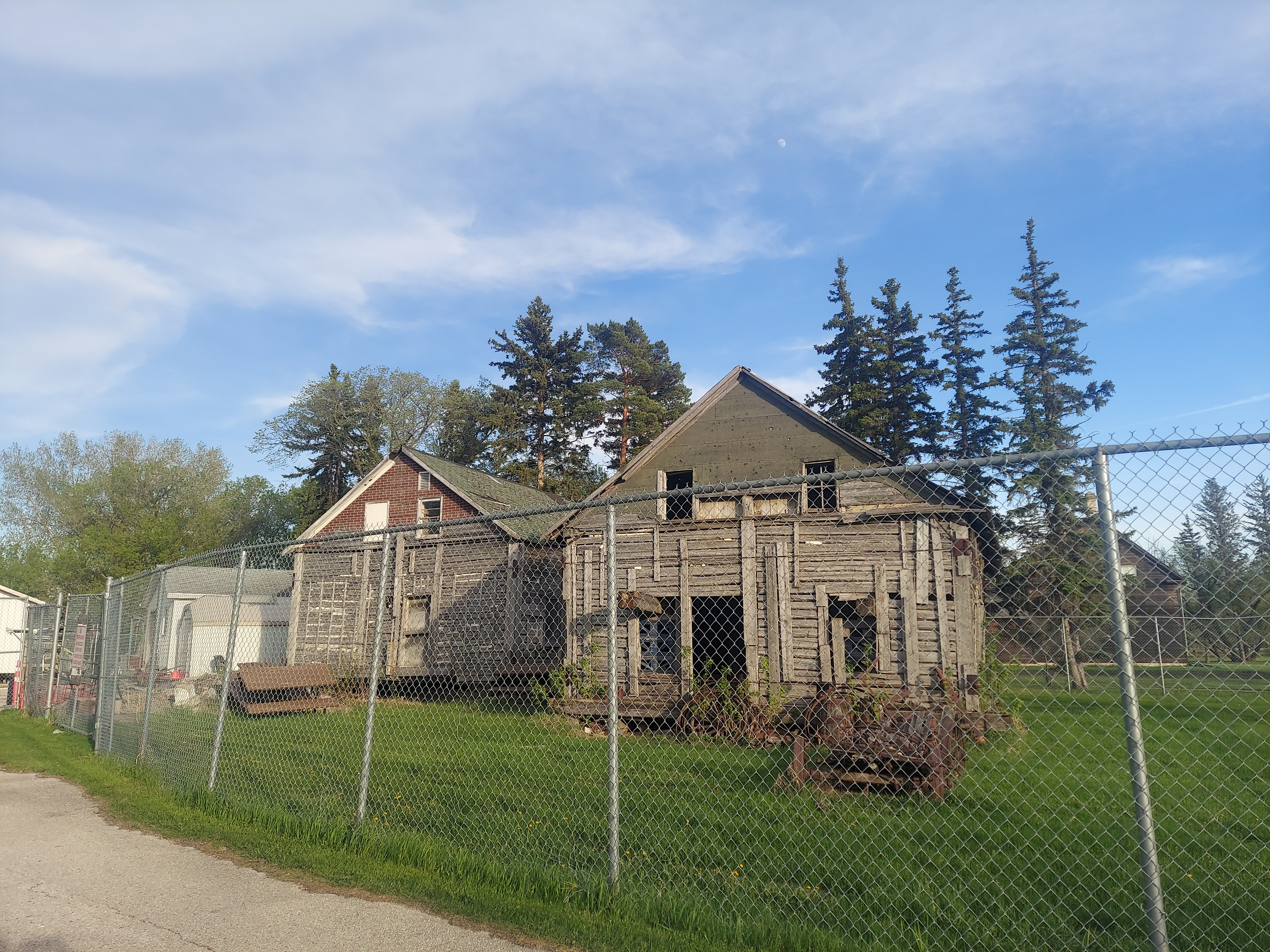
Henderson House (left) and Delorme House (right).

In 1981 an excavation was done on the original Delorme House site by archaeologists from the Manitoba Historic Resources Branch. The outer rings of the logs used to construct the Delorme House were dated to 1854, and a coin minted in 1854 was found on the site. They discovered that there were four outer buildings around the house, as well as a cellar. Bones from beef and pork cuts of meat, kitchen utensils, and other goods used by both the Delorme Family and travellers using the way station were discovered. A significant amount of nails indicated that repairs had been done on the outer buildings and the house.

The house was donated to the province in 1982 by the Vernaus family and was then moved from its original location to St. Norbert Provincial Park for preservation. It currently is behind a chain link fence to protect it, but is still viewable to the public. The house is in poor condition with one side of the building partially missing and metal braces and internal support beams have been added for structural support.

== See also ==
- List of protected areas of Manitoba
- St. Norbert, Winnipeg
- Fort Garry Historical Society
