= Pierre Delorme =

Canadian politician

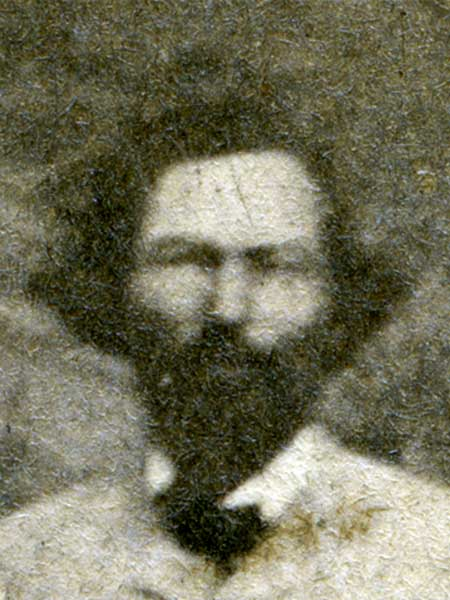
Pierre Delorme

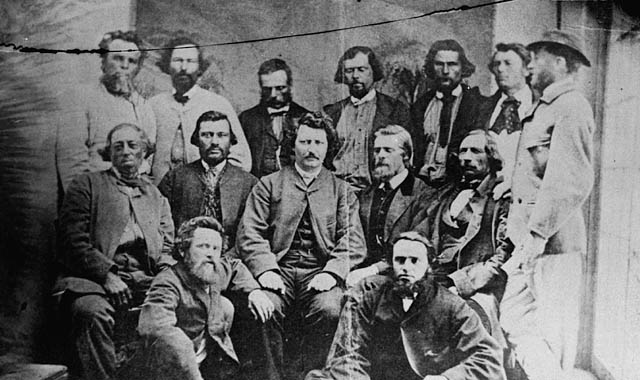
Provisional Government (Pierre Delorme is back row second from left)

Pierre Delorme (de L'Orme) (ca October 1, 1832 – November 10, 1912) was a Métis fur trader, businessman, farmer and political figure. He represented Provencher in the House of Commons of Canada during the 1st Canadian Parliament as a Conservative member from 1871 to 1872. He also represented St. Norbert South in the Legislative Assembly of Manitoba from 1870 to 1874 and St. Norbert from 1878 to 1879.

One of his great-grandchildren is best-selling Métis author George R. D. Goulet. The Provincial Road 210 bridge over the Red River near St. Adolphe is named after Pierre Delorme.

== Life ==
He was born in St. Boniface, Rupert's Land in 1832 to Joseph Amable Fafard dit Delorme and Josephte Bellisle. He worked for the Hudson's Bay Company at Swan River from 1852 to 1856.

In 1854, he was married to Adélaïde Millet dit Beauchemin, daughter of André Millet dit Beauchemin and Madeleine Ducharme. After that, he settled on a farm near Pointe-Coupée (St. Adolphe). He was a member of the provisional government established by Louis Riel and captured Major Charles Arkoll Boulton, Thomas Scott, and others when they attempted to take over Upper Fort Garry (now Winnipeg). He left Riel's government after Boulton was sentenced to be executed. In 1870, he was named a justice of the peace. In 1871, he was part of a group of volunteers organized to defend Manitoba against the Fenian raids. Delorme promoted Louis Riel as a candidate for Provencher in 1872, when Riel stepped aside for Sir George-Étienne Cartier, and 1873. He was named high commissioner in 1873 and served on the Council of the North-West Territories from 1873 to 1875. He was named minister of agriculture and president of the executive council for Manitoba in 1878. Even after he left politics, Delorme lobbied for amnesty for Riel and for Métis land rights.

Delorme returned to the Red River Settlement from Ottawa after his time in the House of Commons. He continued to farm and used his house as a way station for stage coaches travelling the Pembina Trail which connected Fort Garry and St. Paul, Minnesota. In 1881 the Delorme family moved from the West side of the Red River to the East side. Extensive construction material was found which implies that several repairs was done to the house and surrounding buildings.

Delorme died at St. Adolphe, Manitoba in 1912.

== House ==
The Delorme House is significant for being a surviving example of Red River frame architecture. The house was located on Lot 21 of the St. Norbert Parish. In 1981 archaeologists from Manitoba Historic Resources Branch conducted excavations in the pre-1881 Delorme House location. Several artifacts were discovered, with the earliest dated artifact being a coin minted in 1854. A study of tree-rings from the oak timbers used to construct Delorme House had outer rings dating to 1854. Four out buildings were constructed around the house along with a cellar. The quality of the bones from cuts of beef and pork as well as kitchen artifacts such as pottery and utensils varied in quality from expensive to poor. It is suspected that the highest quality goods were used by the Delorme Family while lower quality goods were given to the travellers staying at the way house.

In 1982 the house was donated to the Province by the Vernaus Family. It was then moved from its original location to St. Norbert Provincial Park where stands today. It is located behind a chain link fence for its own protection and is in poor condition.

Parliament of Canada
Preceded by New District	Member of Parliament Provencher; 1871–1872	Succeeded by George-Étienne Cartier
