= Jewish Heritage Centre (Winnipeg) =

Jewish Heritage Centre, Winnipeg
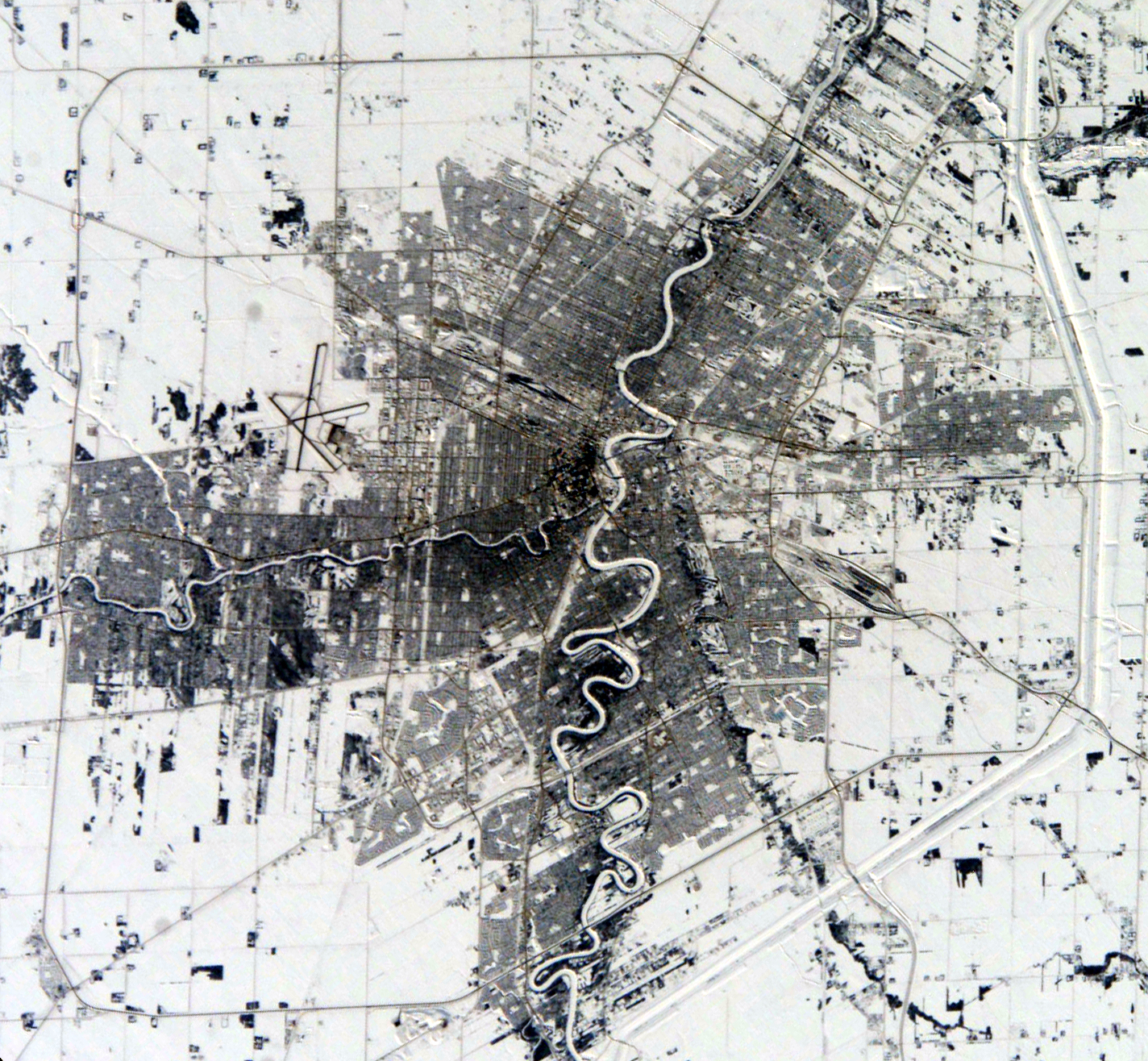
- Location within Winnipeg
- Established: 1998
- Location: Winnipeg, Manitoba, Canada
- Coordinates: 49.8719°N 97.2084°W
- Website: www.jhcwc.org

The Jewish Heritage Centre hosts the Marion and Ed Vickar Jewish Museum of Western Canada in Winnipeg, Manitoba, Canada. The museum opened in 1998 and displays the Jewish history of settlement in Western Canada.

Located on the Asper Jewish Community Campus, the centre is involved in preserving, documenting, interpreting and sharing Jewish heritage. The centre houses a research library, two collection rooms in addition to the museum. The features itself has a Holocaust resource and education centre.

The centre is a registered charity and a beneficiary of the Jewish Federation of Winnipeg. It is governed by a volunteer board of directors. It receives capital grants from The Jewish Foundation of Manitoba.

== Affiliations ==
The Museum is affiliated with: CMA, CHIN, and Virtual Museum of Canada.
