= St. Volodymyr Museum =

Museum in Winnipeg, Canada

Coordinates: 49.9524°N 97.0979°W

- Established: 1967
- Location: 233 Scotia Street, Winnipeg, Manitoba, Canada R2V 1V7
- Type: Ukrainian Catholic history
- Curator: Natalia Radawetz
- Website: St. Volodymyr Ukrainian Catholic Museum

The St. Volodymyr Museum is a museum in Winnipeg, Manitoba, Canada. It was started in Canada's centennial year by the Ukrainian Catholic Women's League of Canada. The museum collects, preserves, interprets and exhibits Ukrainian Catholic material.

The museum is located at 233 Scotia Street.

The Museum is affiliated with Canadian Museums Association, Canadian Heritage Information Network, and Digital Museums Canada.
