= Arrow River, Manitoba =

Arrow River
- Location of Arrow River in Manitoba
- Coordinates: 50°8′38″N 100°53′36″W
- Country: Canada
- Province: Manitoba
- Region: Westman Region
- Census Division: No. 15

Government
  - Governing Body: Prairie View Municipality
  - MP: Dan Mazier
  - MLA: Greg Nesbitt
- Time zone: UTC−6 (CST)
  - Summer (DST): UTC−5 (CDT)
- Postal Code: R0M 2H0
- Area code: 204
- NTS Map: 062K02
- GNBC Code: GABBK

Arrow River is an unincorporated community in southwestern Manitoba, Canada. It is located approximately 10 kilometers (6 miles) east of Miniota, Manitoba in the Prairie View Municipality.

A post office was established on 25-13-26W in 1883 to service the settlers who had begun arriving in 1878. The Canadian Pacific railway point was also established in 1883 as was the School District, located on NE 32-13-25W. The post office was in use until 1970.
