= Isabella, Manitoba =

Isabella
- Location of Isabella in Manitoba
- Coordinates: 50°16′1″N 100°52′24″W
- Country: Canada
- Province: Manitoba
- Region: Westman Region
- Census Division: No. 15

Government
  - Governing Body: Prairie View Municipality
  - MP: Dan Mazier
  - MLA: Greg Nesbitt
- Time zone: UTC−6 (CST)
  - Summer (DST): UTC−5 (CDT)
- Postal Code: R0M 0Y0
- Area code: 204
- NTS Map: 062K07
- GNBC Code: GALPJ

Isabella is a settlement in Prairie View Municipality, Manitoba, Canada. People first began to settle in the Isabella district in the late 1870s. People came to Isabella by various means: foot, ox-cart or horse and wagons.

A post office was established on 16-15-25W in 1906 and was named after a Scottish woman, Isabella Gould Taylor, who was the oldest person in the district at the time. The School District was also established about this time. There was no railway into the town of Isabella until 1909 when the Canadian Northern Railway was built from Hallboro to Isabella. It still contains a store (which is a museum), and 4 other museums (Heise house, Iverach house, The store, The barn, Doran house), a graveyard, and a post office/hall. The post office is still in-use, and is used by various residents of the town. It is virtual ghost town today.
