= Art Gallery of Southwestern Manitoba =

Art museum in Manitoba, Canada

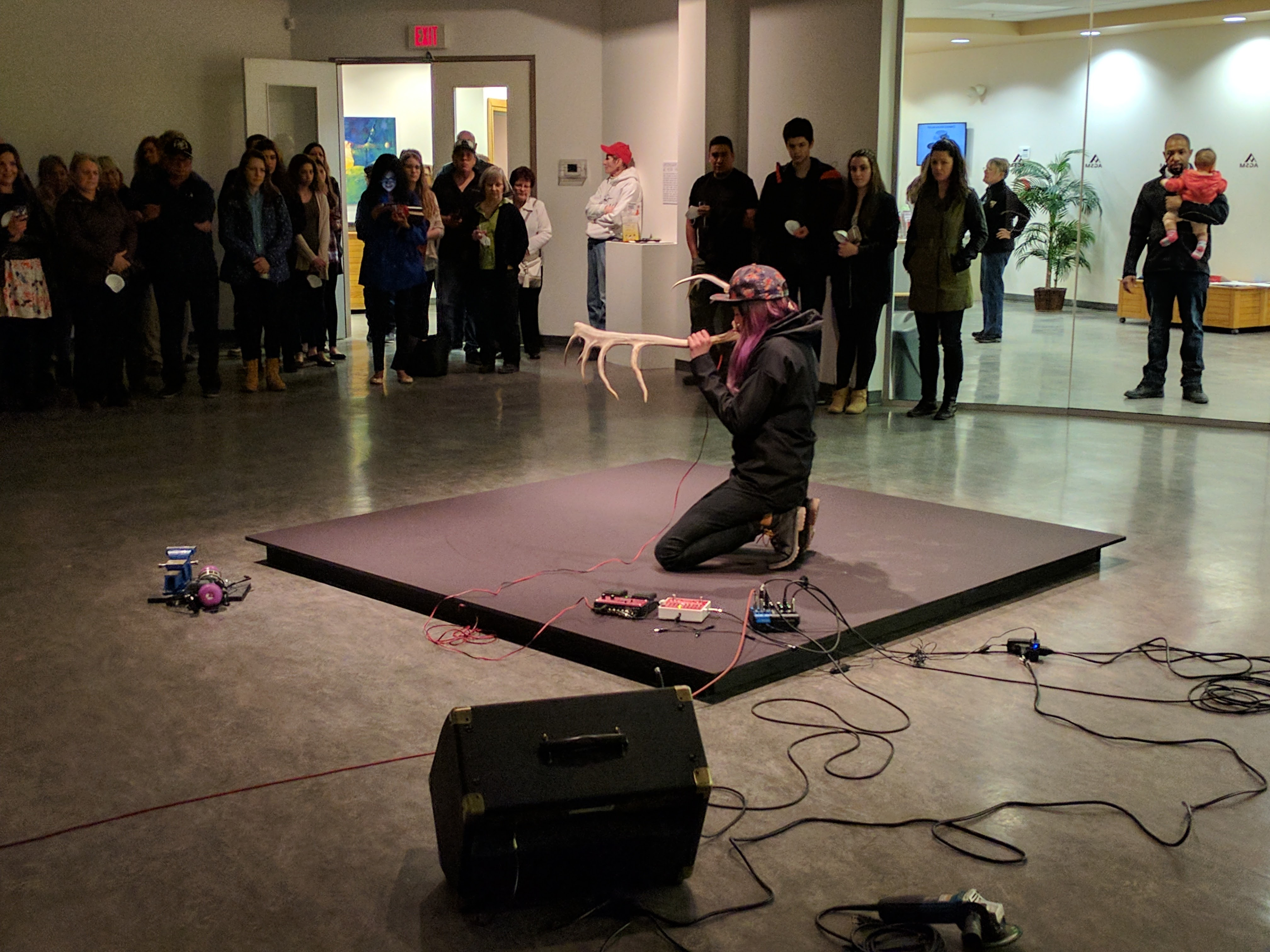
- Jeneen Frei Njootli performing "Herd" as part of Wnoondwaamin
- Former name: Brandon Art Club (1907); Brandon Allied Arts Council (1959)
- Established: 1907; 119 years ago
- Location: 2-710 Rosser Ave. Brandon, Manitoba, Canada
- Coordinates: 49.8479°N 99.9476°W
- Type: Art Gallery
- Visitors: 20,000+ (2019)
- Directors: Kevin Conlin and Lucie Lederhendler
- Chairperson: Alysha Farrell
- Public transit access: Town Centre Transit Terminal
- Parking: Town Centre Parkade
- Website: agsm.ca

The Art Gallery of Southwestern Manitoba (AGSM) is a contemporary art museum in Brandon, Manitoba.

Founded in 1907 as the Brandon Art Club, the AGSM is the oldest centre for visual art in Manitoba and one of the first in Canada.

As a not-for-profit, registered charitable organization, AGSM receives sustained financial support from the Canada Council for the Arts, Manitoba Arts Council, and the City of Brandon.

== History ==
The Art Gallery of Southwestern Manitoba was founded as the Brandon Art Club in 1907. The Brandon Art Club provided an array of classes in drawing, painting and art history, and regularly exhibited work by its members. In 1959, a permanent space for studios and exhibitions was established and renamed the Brandon Allied Arts Council.

In 1989, after a lengthy capital campaign, a permanent building to house an art gallery/studio was renovated on Princess Street, and re-christened the Art Gallery of Southwestern Manitoba.

In 2000, the Gallery was moved to the recently vacated Eaton's building attached to the Town Centre Mall. The 23,000 ft^{2} (2,100 m^{2}) space was renovated with municipal, provincial, federal, and private-sector funds to accommodate a 4,300 ft^{2} (400 m^{2}) environmentally-controlled exhibition space, a community access gallery, and 6 discipline-specific learning/production studios.
