= School of Art Gallery =

- Former name: Gallery One One One
- Established: 1965
- Location: 255 ARTlab, 180 Dafoe Rd, Winnipeg, MB
- Coordinates: 49.8099°N 97.1345°W
- Type: Public art museum
- Collection size: 4,100 artworks
- Director: Blair Fornwald
- Owner: University of Manitoba
- Website: umanitoba.ca/art/gallery

The School of Art Gallery (SOAG)—known as Gallery One One One until 2011—is the public art museum of the University of Manitoba School of Art in Winnipeg, Manitoba, Canada.

The gallery has developed a permanent collection of artworks that focuses on provincial and national artists. The FitzGerald Study Centre was established to promote the study of the life and works of early School of Art principal and member of Canada's Group of Seven, Lionel LeMoine FitzGerald. The gallery's exhibition program includes national and international shows and activities.

The gallery is affiliated with the Canadian Museums Association, the Canadian Heritage Information Network, Virtual Museum of Canada, and the University and College Art Galleries Association of Canada.

== History ==
Gallery One One One was established in 1965 as the professional exhibition centre of the University of Manitoba School of Art.

In 2012, the school and the gallery moved to its current location in the Art Research Technology Laboratory (ARTlab) at the university's Fort Garry campus, and the gallery changed its name to the School of Art Gallery.

== Collection ==
Collecting both historical and contemporary art, the School of Art houses a growing collection of more than 4,100 artworks—the largest art collection within the University of Manitoba.

This collection has two parts:

- the FitzGerald Study Collection, a collection devoted to Lionel LeMoine FitzGerald and his contemporaries, Canada's "Group of Seven"
- the Permanent Collection, a range of historical and contemporary work, both Canadian and non-Canadian
