= Prairie View Municipality =

Rural municipality in Manitoba, Canada

Prairie View
- Rural municipality
- Prairie View Municipality
- Location of the Prairie View Municipality in Manitoba
- Coordinates: 50.460°N 100.988°W
- Country: Canada
- Province: Manitoba
- Region: Westman
- Incorporated (amalgamated): January 1, 2015

Area
  - Total: 1,694.69 km^{2} (654.32 sq mi)

Population (2021)
  - Total: 2,161
  - Density: 1.275/km^{2} (3.303/sq mi)
- Time zone: UTC-6 (CST)
  - Summer (DST): UTC-5 (CDT)

Prairie View Municipality is a rural municipality (RM) in the Canadian province of Manitoba

== History ==
It was incorporated on January 1, 2015 via the amalgamation of the RMs of Birtle and Miniota and the Town of Birtle. It was formed as a requirement of The Municipal Amalgamations Act, which required that municipalities with a population less than 1,000 amalgamate with one or more neighbouring municipalities by 2015. The Government of Manitoba initiated these amalgamations in order for municipalities to meet the 1997 minimum population requirement of 1,000 to incorporate a municipality. The reeve of the RM is Roger Wilson.

== Communities ==
- Arrow River
- Beulah
- Birtle
- Crandall
- Foxwarren
- Isabella
- Miniota
- Quadra
- Reeder
- Solsgirth
- Uno

== Demographics ==
In the 2021 Census of Population conducted by Statistics Canada, Prairie View had a population of 2,161 living in 832 of its 970 total private dwellings, a change of 3.5% from its 2016 population of 2,088. With a land area of 1,694.69 km^{2} (654.32 sq mi), it had a population density of 1.3/km^{2} (3.3/sq mi) in 2021.
