= Foxwarren, Manitoba =

Coordinates: 50°31′13″N 101°09′14″W

Foxwarren
- Unincorporated community
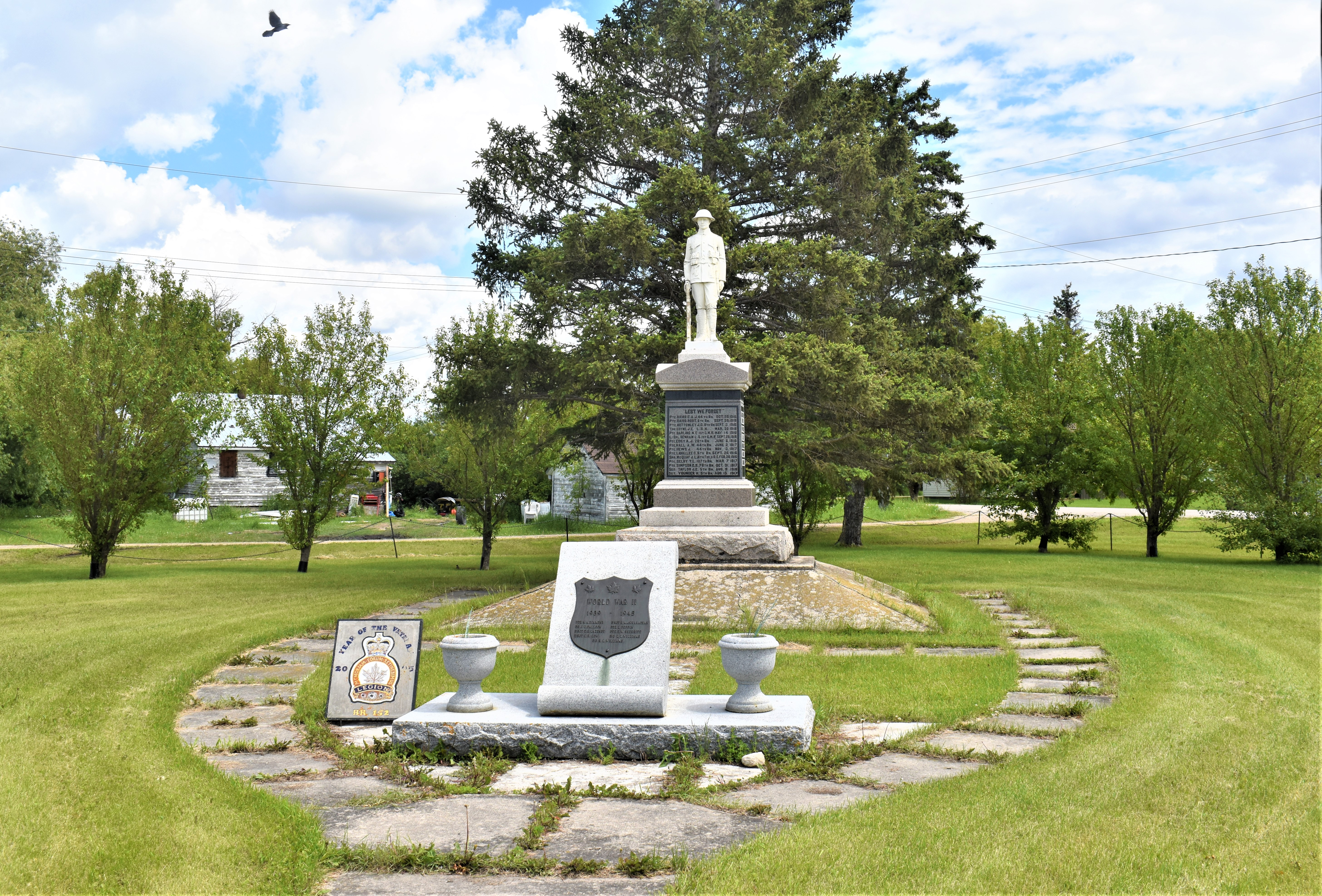
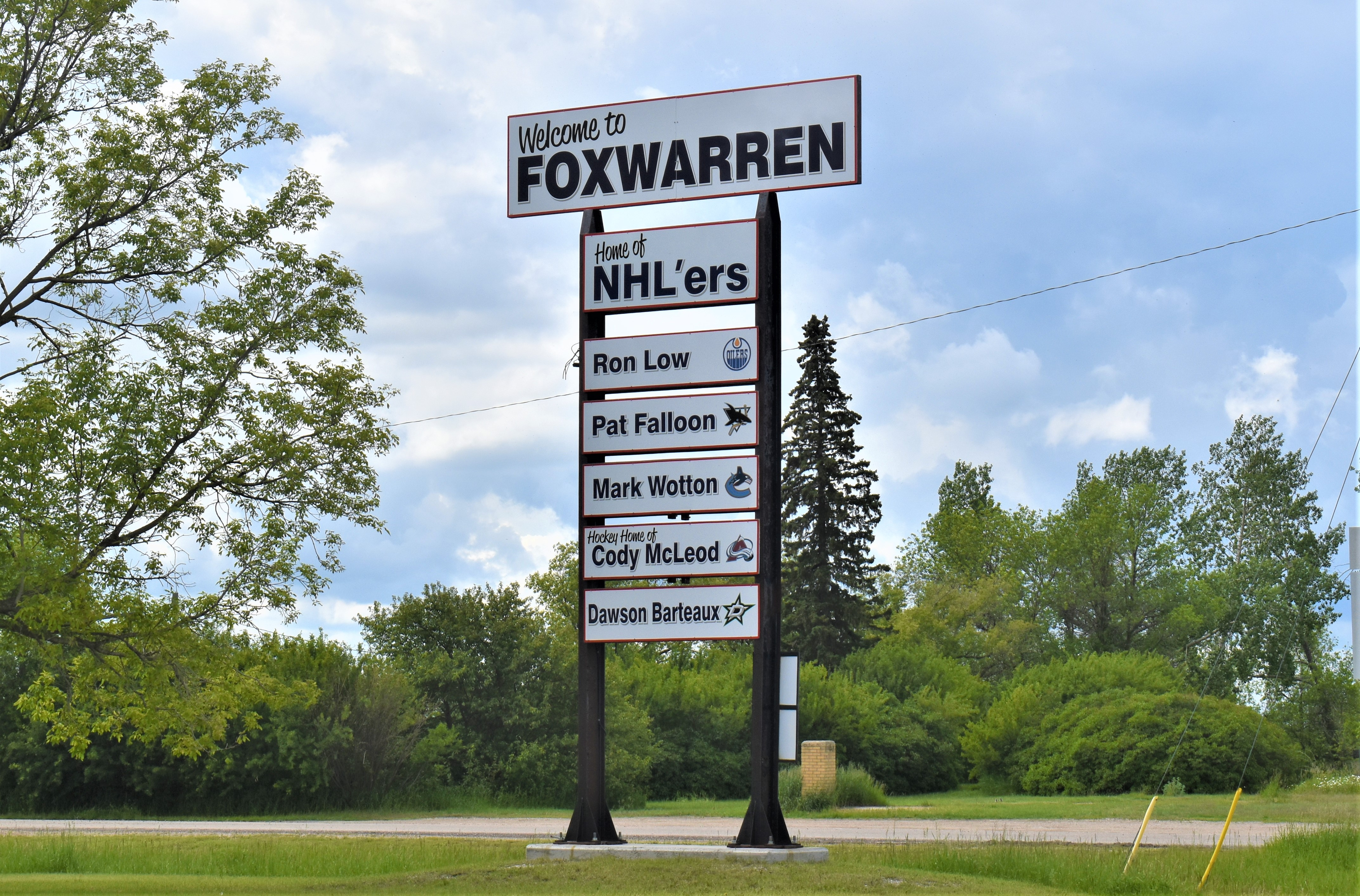
- The Foxwarren war memorial Community sign listing residents that went on to play or coach in the NHL.

- Location within Manitoba
- Country: Canada
- Province: Manitoba
- Municipality: Prairie View Municipality

Population (2024)
  - Total: <100

Foxwarren is a community in the Prairie View Municipality in the Canadian province of Manitoba. It is located along the concurrence of Provincial Trunk Highways 16 and 83.

The community was first noted on a map in 1888 as Fox Warren. The Post Office opened in 1889. The Canadian Pacific Railway established a railpoint and a school district were formed with the same name.

An Environment Canada Radar station is located in Foxwarren. It serves the Westman Region of the province.

== Notable residents ==
A few residents of Foxwarren have played in the NHL over the years, with the community placing their names on their welcome sign.

- Ron Low
- Pat Falloon
- Mark Wotton

== Bibliography ==
- Geographical Names of Manitoba - Foxwarren (page 86) - the Millennium Bureau of Canada
