= Dan Mazier =

Canadian politician (born c. 1963)

Dan Mazier MP
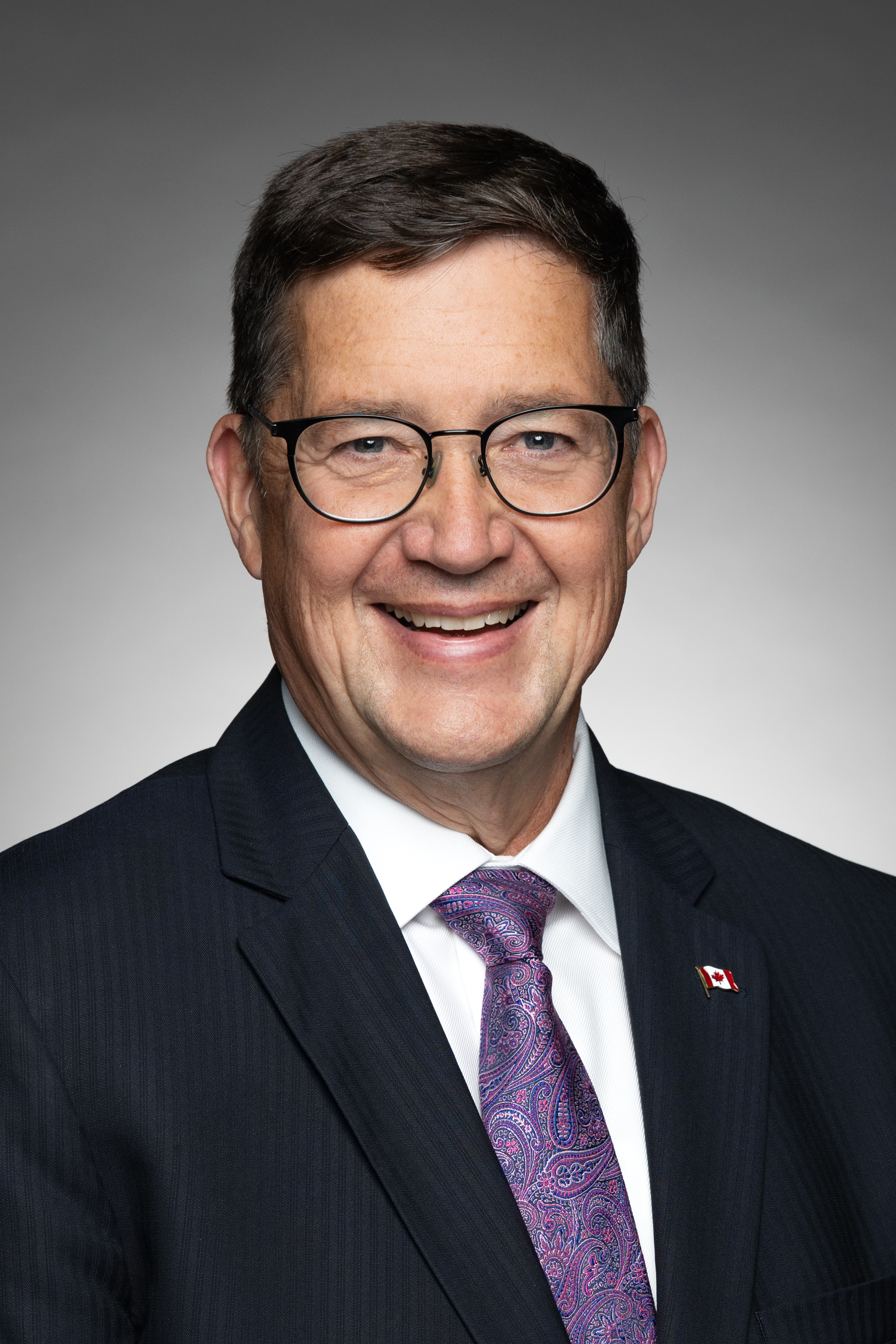

Member of Parliament for Riding Mountain Dauphin—Swan River—Neepawa (2019-2025)
- Incumbent
- Assumed office October 21, 2019
- Preceded by: Robert Sopuck

Personal details
- Born: 1963 or 1964 (age 62–63) near Forrest, Manitoba, Canada
- Party: Conservative Party of Canada

Dan Mazier MP (born 1963 or 1964) is a Canadian politician who was elected to represent the riding of Riding Mountain (formerly Dauphin—Swan River—Neepawa) in the House of Commons of Canada. He was first elected in the 2019 Canadian federal election following his tenure as president of Keystone Agricultural Producers.

== Background ==
In 2018, Mazier stepped down as President of Manitoba's largest general farm organization, Keystone Agricultural Producers (KAP), to seek the federal nomination for the Conservative Party of Canada in the constituency of Dauphin—Swan River—Neepawa. He successfully became the party's candidate and went on to win a seat in the House of Commons in the 2019 election.

Mazier's victory was attributed to his focus on rural Canada. This included his focus on improving rural connectivity with better internet and cell phone service and supporting seniors and families living on fixed-incomes.

== 43rd Parliament ==
After being sworn into office, Mazier was named as the Deputy Shadow Minister for Environment and Climate Change by then leader, Andrew Scheer. Mazier focused on bringing a rural lens to environmental policy. This included his strong opposition to the federal carbon tax and his support for environmental policies that empowered farmers, ranchers, and landowners to participate in ecological goods and services programs.

In 2020, Mazier was appointed to the Standing Committee on Fisheries and Oceans by newly elected leader, Erin O'Toole.

=== Bill C-299 (An Act to Amend the Telecommunications Act) ===
In the 43rd Parliament, Mazier introduced Bill C-299, An Act to amend the Telecommunications Act (transparent and accurate broadband services information), on June 16, 2021. Bill C-299 was intended to tackle misleading speed claims by Canadian internet service providers. Bill C-299 received support from high-profile advocacy organizations, including OpenMedia, who agreed with Mazier's notion that Canadians were paying for lower quality internet speeds that what was advertised to them. Bill C-299 never reached a vote in the House of Commons due to the early election call later that year.

== 44th Parliament ==
Following the 2021 federal election, Mazier was appointed to the Standing Committee on Science and Research. Mazier moved a motion for the committee to study the use of federal research and development grants by Canadian universities and research institutions in partnerships with entities connected to the People's Republic of China, covering sensitive fields including photonics, artificial intelligence, quantum theory, biopharmaceuticals, and aerospace. The committee passed the motion on June 6, 2023, to examine intellectual property transfers and research collaborations with Chinese entities of national security concern, including Huawei Technologies and the National University of Defense Technology. The findings of the study were published in the report The Security of Research Partnerships Between Canadian Universities, Research Institutions and Entities Connected to the People's Republic of China which was tabled in the House of Commons on May 2, 2024.

On October 12, 2022, Mazier was appointed as the Official Opposition's Shadow Minister for Rural Economic Development & Connectivity by Conservative Party of Canada Leader, Pierre Poilievre.

On September 21, 2023, Mazier was elected vice-chair of the Canadian House of Commons Standing Committee on Environment and Sustainable Development.

=== Bill C-288 (An Act to Amend the Telecommunications Act) ===
In the 44th Parliament, Mazier introduced Bill C-288, An Act to amend the Telecommunications Act (transparent and accurate broadband services information), as a private member's bill on June 16, 2022. The bill was nearly identical to his earlier Bill C-299 from the 43rd Parliament, which had died on the order paper when the 2021 federal election was called before it could advance past second reading. Bill C-288 would require Canadian internet service providers to disclose transparent and accurate broadband speed information to consumers, replacing the industry practice of advertising maximum theoretical speeds that most customers would never receive in practice. The bill passed third reading in the House of Commons on April 26, 2023 and received Royal Assent on June 20, 2024, becoming law as S.C. 2024, c. 10.

=== Net Zero Accelerator Initiative Investigation ===
As vice-chair of the Standing Committee on Environment and Sustainable Development (ENVI) during the 44th Parliament, Mazier led the Conservative opposition effort to scrutinize the federal government's $8-billion Net Zero Accelerator (NZA) initiative. The committee's examination was prompted by an April 2024 audit by the Commissioner of the Environment and Sustainable Development, which found significant shortcomings in the effectiveness of the program despite the government's stated emissions reduction objectives. The audit found that only 5 of the 17 funded projects had a signed commitment to reduce a precise amount of emissions, with the remaining 12 lacking any such obligations.

On May 31, 2024, Mazier invoked Standing Order 106(4) to compel an emergency meeting of the committee on the Net Zero Accelerator Fund, the first time in the history of the Standing Committee on Environment and Sustainable Development that the procedure had been used. On June 4, 2024, the committee passed a motion ordering the government to produce complete and unredacted contribution agreements and term sheets for all NZA recipients. The committee further ordered the government's unrestricted internal tracker tool used to measure the NZA's progress and results.

At a December 4, 2024 committee hearing, Mazier confronted Associate Deputy Minister Francis Bilodeau, presenting the committee with a physical demonstration of the 360 pages that had been redacted from the contracts, and demanding to know who had ordered the removals. Bilodeau confirmed that the department itself had removed the information, citing commercial confidentiality obligations to third-party recipients. Mazier also used the December hearing to press officials on value for money, questioning why $700 million had been allocated to PowerCo, a subsidiary of the Volkswagen Group, while officials were unable to provide any quantitative estimate of how many greenhouse gas emissions the investment would directly reduce. Mazier characterized the program as a handout rather than a climate initiative, pointing to the Environment Commissioner's finding that over 70 percent of the contracts signed carried no commitment to reduce emissions, and noting that many of the recipient companies were foreign-owned. He publicly identified several non-Canadian corporate recipients, including $700 million to PowerCo (Volkswagen), $551 million to Umicore, and $300 million to Air Products.

The government announced in their 2025 federal budget that funding would not be renewed for the Net Zero Accelerator.

=== Jasper Wildfire Investigation ===
Mazier played a central role in the Standing Committee on Environment and Sustainable Development's investigation into the factors leading to the July 2024 Jasper National Park wildfire, which destroyed approximately 30 percent of the townsite, burned over 360 square kilometres, and caused nearly $1 billion in damage. In advance of the committee's hearings, Mazier released Access to Information records on September 10, 2024 showing that Parks Canada managers had expressed alarm over "public and political perception" of removing dead trees as a fire risk in the months before the fire. One internal email from a senior Parks Canada director read: "at what point do we make the organizational decision to cancel prescribed burns in Western Canada?… Public and political perception may become more important than actual prescription windows." Mazier argued the documents demonstrated that the government had prioritized political optics over evidence-based fire management, pointing to warnings scientists had sent to the Liberal government as far back as 2017 that a catastrophic fire in Jasper was "a matter of when, not if."

At subsequent committee hearings, Mazier pressed Parks Canada and Environment Minister Steven Guilbeault on the government's preparedness failures. The investigation uncovered testimony from Kris Liivam, president of Arctic Fire Safety Services, who accused Parks Canada of mismanaging the wildfire response by obstructing private fire crews and failing to coordinate effectively.

== 45th Parliament ==
In the 2025 federal election, Mazier was re-elected in the newly redistricted riding of Riding Mountain with 28,409 votes and 67.8 percent of the vote, the highest total vote count and largest vote share of his electoral career.

Following the 2025 federal election, Mazier was appointed as the Official Opposition's Shadow Minister for Health by Conservative Party of Canada Leader, Pierre Poilievre. On June 17, 2025, he was elected as the Vice Chair of the Canadian House of Commons Standing Committee on Health.

On September 23, 2025 Mazier passed a motion at the Standing Committee on Health to undertake a study on the impact of the federal government’s immigration policy to healthcare and the barriers preventing the integration of internationally educated health professionals into the Canadian healthcare system. The study resulted in significant attention raised on the topics of foreign-sponsored visa-trainees, Canadian students studying medicine abroad, and the disconnect between federal immigration levels and healthcare capacity. During the study, Mazier passed a motion instructing the Parliamentary Budget Officer (PBO) of Canada to conduct a fiscal analysis on the Interim Federal Health Program (IFHP), a federal program that was designed to provide temporary health care coverage to asylum claimants in Canada, after reports emerged that the cost of the IFHP had increased more than 1,100% in less than 10 years from $66.3 million in 2016-17 to $797.2 million in 2024-25. On February 12, 2026 the PBO published the report that revealed the program would cost Canadians over $1.5 billion annually by 2030. Mazier challenged the IFHP and raised concern that asylum claimants who had been rejected by the federal Immigration and Refugee Board, remained eligible for health benefits including supplemental health benefits such as vision care, physiotherapy, home care and speech therapy. This led to the Conservative opposition introducing a motion in the House of Commons that called on the Liberal government to review the health benefits available to asylum claimants and end supplemental benefits for those whose claims have been rejected. The motion was defeated on February 25, 2026.

=== Bill C-272 (An Act to amend the Controlled Drugs and Substances Act) ===
On March 26, 2025 Mazier introduced Bill C-272, An Act to amend the Controlled Drugs and Substances Act (supervised drug consumption sites). The bill would amend the Controlled Drugs and Substances Act to prohibit any federal regulation or ministerial exemption from allowing a supervised drug consumption or overdose prevention site to operate within 500 metres of an elementary or secondary school, a daycare centre, or a playground. Under the bill's provisions, existing sites within the buffer zone would have their federal exemptions automatically revoked upon the legislation coming into force, with a 180-day transition period for compliance, and mobile sites would be deemed to carry a condition prohibiting service delivery within the specified distance. In introducing the bill, Mazier argued that the federal Minister of Health had the authority to prevent supervised consumption sites from operating near children but had failed to act, pointing to reports of used needles found on playgrounds and daycares shutting down as a result of nearby site approvals.

=== Grifols and Canadian Blood Plasma ===
In August 2025, Mazier raised concerns following a Globe and Mail investigation reporting that Canadian Blood Services had supplied donated blood plasma to Grifols, a Spanish pharmaceutical company, which was manufacturing products from it for sale abroad, contrary to public assurances that donated Canadian plasma would not be exported for profit. Conservative members of the Standing Committee on Health, sent a letter to committee chair calling for a parliamentary investigation into Grifols's use of Canadian-donated plasma and the potential conflict of interest arising from Prime Minister Mark Carney's personal investments in Brookfield Asset Management, which had twice attempted to acquire Grifols.

The issue escalated further when two people died in Winnipeg after donating plasma at separate Grifols collection centres. Conservative members of the health committee ordered the production of documents that revealed subsequent Health Canada inspections found recurring, systemic deficiencies at the Grifols sites in Winnipeg. In March 2026, Mazier passed a motion at the committee to order the production of the agreement between Canadian Blood Services and Grifols following testimony from Mary Hughes, Vice-President of Grifols Canada who was summoned to testify at the committee.

=== PrescribeIT ===
As Shadow Minister of Health, Mazier led the Conservative opposition's scrutiny of the federal government's handling of PrescribeIT, a digital prescription program launched in 2017 and administered by Canada Health Infoway that received more than $298 million in federal funding before being cancelled on May 29, 2026, despite fewer than five percent of Canadian prescriptions ever flowing through the service. On April 27, 2026, Mazier held a press conference on Parliament Hill calling for an Auditor General investigation, and the health committee subsequently voted unanimously to request that the Auditor General conduct a full audit of PrescribeIT, including its costs, governance, and intellectual property arrangements.

== Electoral record ==
2025 Canadian federal election: Riding Mountain
Party	Candidate	Votes	%	±%	Expenditures
Conservative	Dan Mazier	28,409	67.85	+8.66	
Liberal	Terry Hayward	9,281	22.16	+9.42	
New Democratic	Andrew Douglas Maxwell	3,072	7.34	-7.18	
People's	Jim Oliver	564	1.35	-9.20	
Green	Liz Clayton	547	1.31	-0.80	
Total valid votes/expense limit		41,873	99.37		
Total rejected ballots		265	0.63		
Turnout		42,138	65.03		
Eligible voters		64,799			
Conservative notional hold		Swing		-0.38	
Source: Elections Canada

2021 Canadian federal election: Dauphin—Swan River—Neepawa
Party	Candidate	Votes	%	±%	Expenditures
Conservative	Dan Mazier	22,718	59.0	-5.2	$38,088.60
New Democratic	Arthur Holroyd	5,678	14.7	+0.6	$0.00
Liberal	Kevin Carlson	4,892	12.7	-0.5	$12,490.55
People's	Donnan McKenna	4,052	10.5	+8.7	$13,188.78
Green	Shirley Lambrecht	835	2.2	-3.3	$0.00
Maverick	Lori Falloon-Austin	339	0.9	N/A	$0.00
Total valid votes/expense limit		38,514	99.4	–	$129,256.28
Total rejected ballots		226	0.6		
Turnout		38,740	62.2		
Eligible voters		62,242			
Conservative hold		Swing		-2.9	
Source: Elections Canada

2019 Canadian federal election: Dauphin—Swan River—Neepawa
Party	Candidate	Votes	%	±%	Expenditures
Conservative	Dan Mazier	26,103	64.2	+17.86	$47,835.45
New Democratic	Laverne Lewycky	5,724	14.1	+1.85	none listed
Liberal	Cathy Scofield-Singh	5,344	13.2	-16.31	$10,110.34
Green	Kate Storey	2,214	5.5	+1.67	none listed
People's	Frank Godon	711	1.8	–	none listed
Christian Heritage	Jenni Johnson	470	1.2	–	none listed
Total valid votes/expense limit		40,566	100.0		–
Total rejected ballots		279	–	–	
Turnout		40,845	66.2	–	
Eligible voters		61,722			
Conservative hold		Swing		+8.01	
Source: Elections Canada
