= Miniota =

Coordinates: 50°08′36″N 101°01′59″W

Miniota, Manitoba is an unincorporated community recognized as a local urban district in Prairie View Municipality, Manitoba, Canada. It is located northwest of Virden near the intersection of PTH 83 and PTH 24. The post office opened in 1885 on 36-13-27W. It was originally named Parkisimo and changed to its present name in 1900. It had two railways in its history: the Canadian Pacific Railway and the Grand Trunk Railway (now Canadian National Railway). Both had rail points about one mile apart, and there was a Miniota Station on the latter.

Miniota has a K-8 school, and a motel, and the biggest employer is the local co-op. There is also the Miniota Municipal Museum.

== Demographics ==
In the 2021 Census of Population conducted by Statistics Canada, Miniota had a population of 282 living in 120 of its 135 total private dwellings, a change of 23.1% from its 2016 population of 229. With a land area of 0.94 km^{2} (0.36 sq mi), it had a population density of 300.0/km^{2} (777.0/sq mi) in 2021.
