= Birtle, Manitoba =

Canadian unincorporated community founded 1884

Birtle
- Unincorporated Community
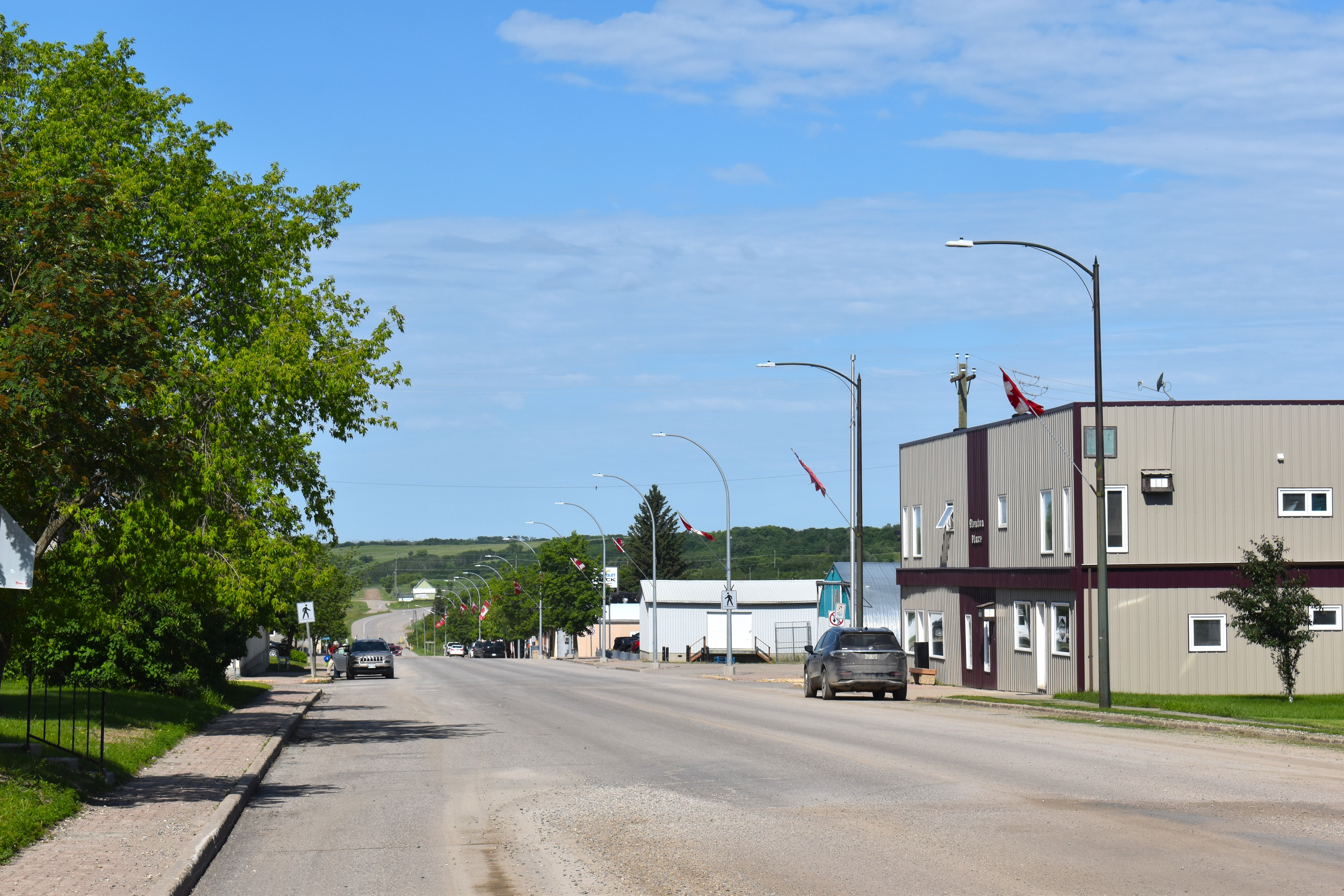
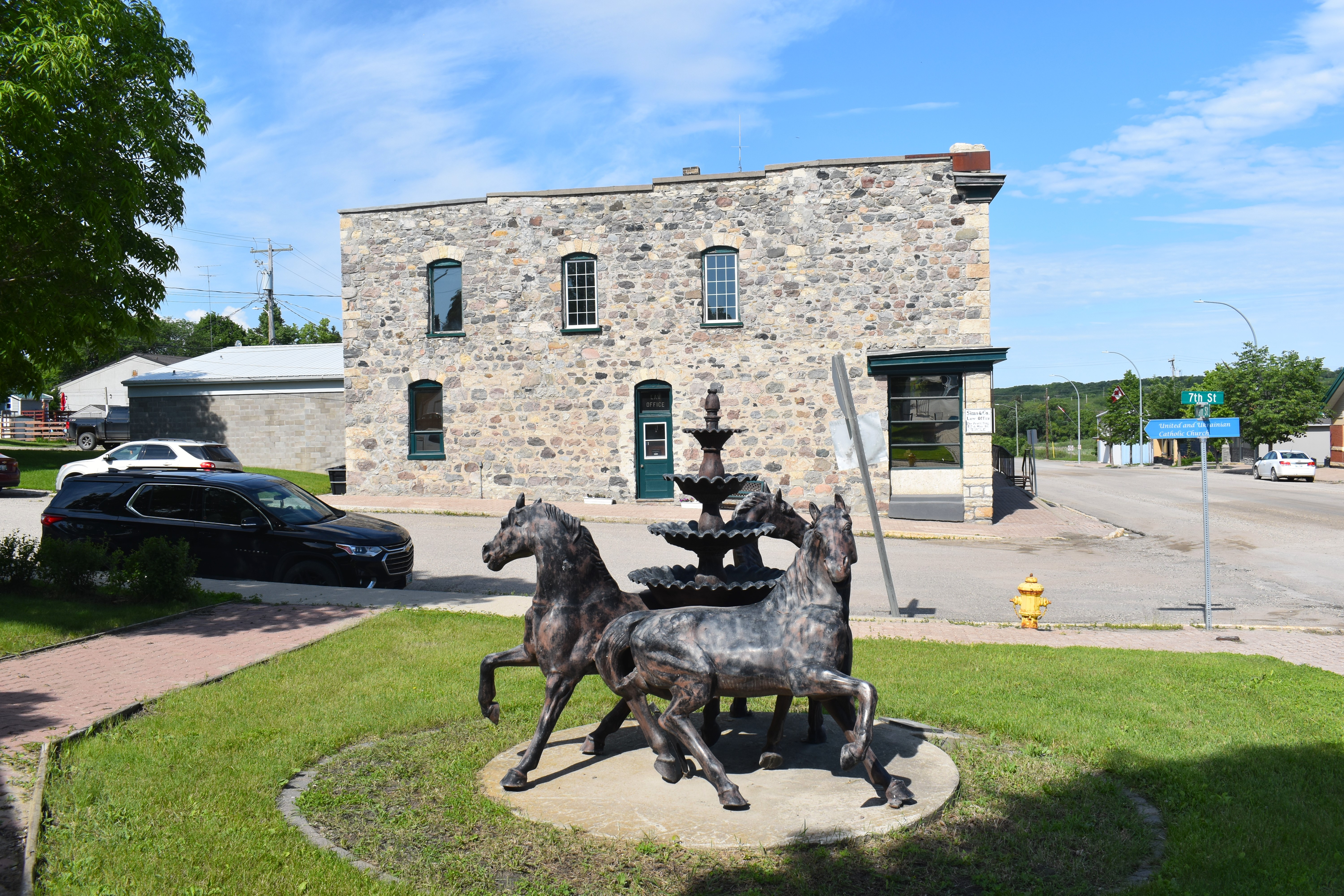
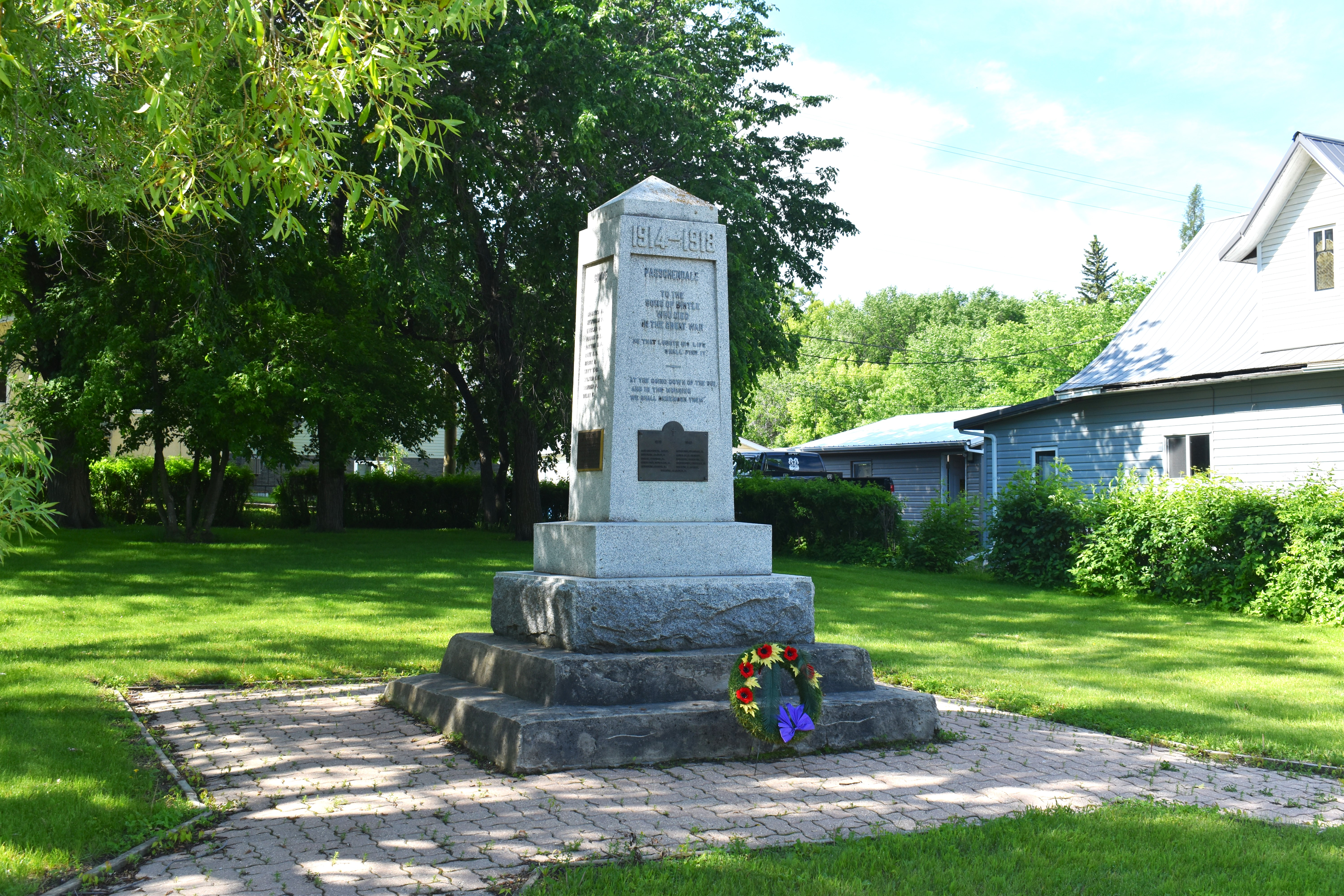
- Looking west down Main Street in Birtle. Horse fountain in front of the Pratt Building on Main Street. Birtle war memorial.

- Location within Manitoba
- Coordinates: 50°25′21″N 101°02′51″W
- Country: Canada
- Province: Manitoba
- Established: 1884; 142 years ago

Area
  - Total: 9.26 km^{2} (3.58 sq mi)

Population (2021)
  - Total: 625
  - Density: 67.5/km^{2} (175/sq mi)
- Time zone: UTC−6 (CST)
  - Summer (DST): UTC−5 (CDT)
- Postal Code: R0M 0C0
- Area codes: 204, 431

Birtle is an unincorporated urban community in the Prairie View Municipality within the Canadian province of Manitoba that held town status prior to 1 January 2015. It is located at the junction of Highways 83 and 42.

== History ==
Birtle was incorporated in 1884. In 1891, Birtle had a population of 338.

The community lies in the Birdtail River valley. It features a spacious community park developed in the early years of the community with additions through the years to bring it to the current time where the original golf course designed to take advantage of the valley contours now enjoys the modern amenities and the tennis courts still located in the original location now feature modern plexipave surfaces and are some of the best in western Manitoba.

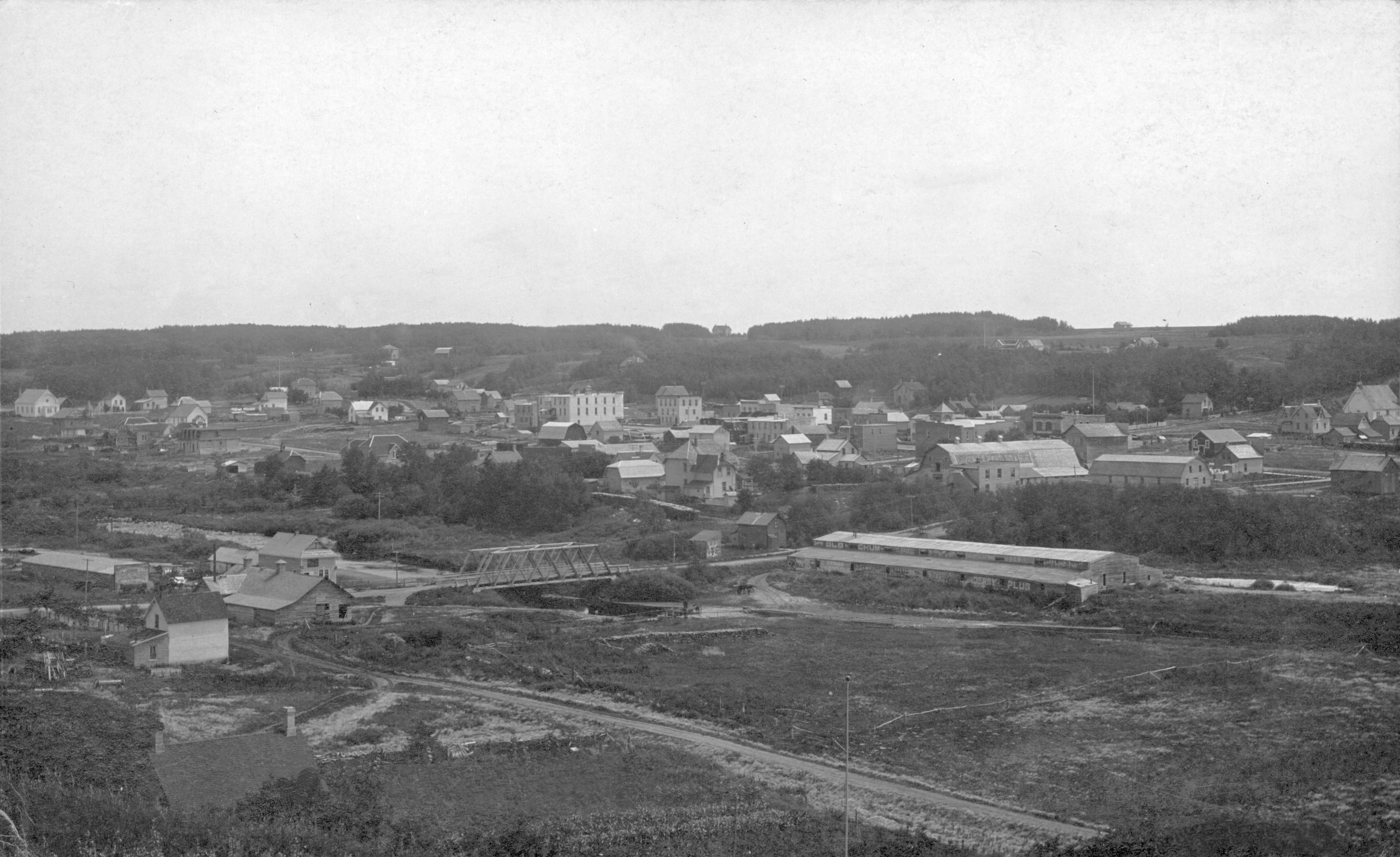
Birtle, circa 1910

Another attraction is the Birdtail Country Museum, housed in an historic stone building on Main Street. The building was built in the early 1900s to be used as the Union Bank. Later it was purchased by the Royal Bank of Canada. The main floor was the bank premises. The second floor was the bank manager's living-quarters.

In 1983, the building was purchased by the former town and the former Rural Municipality of Birtle. It officially opened as the Birdtail Country Museum on 24 May 1984, as a joint centennial project of the former town and former rural municipality. Inside are more than 4,000 artifacts related to the area, including such historical items such as the diaries of original settlers (Alfred Morton's, from 1878), button hooks for ladies' boots, and ice-saws and ice-tongs used for harvesting ice from the Birdtail River in the winter. The Museum houses the trophies awarded to Samuel Larcombe, one of the early settlers of Birtle. In 1917, Larcombe, the "World Wheat King", developed a variety of rust-resistant wheat. The second floor of the Museum is set up to resemble a Victorian home. People often come to the Museum to do genealogy research through the microfilm reader, which contains every edition of the Birtle 'Eye Witness' newspaper, dating back to 1891. Local history books for the community and surrounding districts provide additional sources of information.

A self-guided Heritage Walking Tour describes the history of many of the buildings and sites in the community.

In 1974, the Municipality of Birtle History Committee published A View of the Birdtail documenting the history of the municipality from 1878 to 1974. The History Committee was chaired by then Mayor, Ray Howard and included representatives from each of the districts of the municipality. A second book, Passing it On, documenting the history of the municipality and town was published in 2009.

Birtle was designated as Birds Tail Rivulet on the Thompson map of 1813–14. The settlement was founded in 1879 and first called St. Clair City.

The Birtle Indian Residential School operated from 1888 to 1970.

== Geography ==
The Birdtail River is smaller slow flowing river dammed just above the Birtle Park, creating a small lake suitable for canoeing, kayaking and fishing. The Birdtail flows into the Assiniboine just a few miles south of Birtle. A 15-minute drive west the Qu'Apelle River flows into the Assiniboine. Many tributaries, ravines and valleys make this a very scenic region with ample habitat for a variety of wildlife and a popular area for birders. Fertile agricultural fields surround the community in all directions.

=== Climate ===
Summers are warm, with a mean temperature of 17.9 °C (64.2 °F) in July. Winter are long and cold, with a mean temperature of −18.3 °C (−0.9 °F) in January.

Climate data for Birtle
Month	Jan	Feb	Mar	Apr	May	Jun	Jul	Aug	Sep	Oct	Nov	Dec	Year
Record high °C (°F)	7.8 (46.0)	13 (55)	19 (66)	34 (93)	36.5 (97.7)	40.6 (105.1)	40 (104)	38.3 (100.9)	37.2 (99.0)	32.5 (90.5)	18.9 (66.0)	13.3 (55.9)	30.6 (87.1)
Mean daily maximum °C (°F)	−13.1 (8.4)	−9.1 (15.6)	−1.5 (29.3)	9.2 (48.6)	18.4 (65.1)	22.3 (72.1)	24.5 (76.1)	24 (75)	17.5 (63.5)	10 (50)	−2 (28)	−10.8 (12.6)	7.4 (45.3)
Daily mean °C (°F)	−18.3 (−0.9)	−14.4 (6.1)	−6.7 (19.9)	3.1 (37.6)	11.4 (52.5)	15.7 (60.3)	17.9 (64.2)	17 (63)	11 (52)	4.1 (39.4)	−6.5 (20.3)	−15.6 (3.9)	1.6 (34.9)
Mean daily minimum °C (°F)	−23.3 (−9.9)	−19.6 (−3.3)	−12 (10)	−3 (27)	4.3 (39.7)	9.1 (48.4)	11.2 (52.2)	10 (50)	4.5 (40.1)	−1.8 (28.8)	−11 (12)	−20.2 (−4.4)	−4.3 (24.3)
Record low °C (°F)	−45.6 (−50.1)	−44.5 (−48.1)	−45.6 (−50.1)	−28.9 (−20.0)	−13.5 (7.7)	−6.1 (21.0)	−4.4 (24.1)	−4 (25)	−12.8 (9.0)	−26.7 (−16.1)	−38 (−36)	−43 (−45)	−45.6 (−50.1)
Average precipitation mm (inches)	20.5 (0.81)	15.3 (0.60)	21.6 (0.85)	27 (1.1)	48.8 (1.92)	85.1 (3.35)	70.8 (2.79)	65.3 (2.57)	50.7 (2.00)	28.7 (1.13)	19.9 (0.78)	19.4 (0.76)	473.1 (18.63)
Source: Environment Canada

== Facilities and tourism ==
The local high school (grades 5 to 12), Birtle Collegiate Institute, draws students from surrounding communities. In addition to regular academic classes, the school offers a construction technology program and in 2014–15 offered an opportunity to receive both a highschool diploma and a health care aide certificate. The elementary school houses Kindergarten to grade 4 classes and houses the Park West School Division offices.

The feature outdoor community recreation development is the Birtle Riverside Park where many amenities are found in one location. These include a golf course, licensed clubhouse restaurant, tennis courts, serviced campground, picnic area, tennis courts, a large playground and the Birtle beach – a sand bottom chlorinated swimming area alongside but separate from the river. There are many other recreation facilities in the community that include a skating arena and curling rink both with artificial ice, a 24/7 fitness centre, baseball and soccer leagues, and trails for cross country skiing and snowmobile trails linked to the Snowtraxx and Snowman routes across the province.

An attraction for tourists and locals is a costume barn, Whooo's That? where visitors can peruse thousands of theme and period costumes or opt for a photo shoot in period dress.

The area has become known for its community of gardeners. National Communities in Bloom titles were won in 2000 and 2001. A biannual Gallery in the Garden event features art displayed in private and community gardens. Some private gardens are also available to be viewed throughout the summer season. Some are part of the Gardens of Western Manitoba seasonal self-guided tour.

Also see the museum and heritage self-guided tour under "history".

== Economy ==
The main industries of the area are agriculture and livestock: cattle and hogs primarily, and to a lesser extent sheep, goats, dairy cows, etc. The climate and soil are best suited for hard grains such as wheat, rye and barley, but canola also thrives. Crops are sown in spring (May) and harvested at the end of summer (August/September).

The potash mine located 50 km away just inside the Saskatchewan border provides employment for many people in the area. This has become more prominent since a large expansion of the industry which began in 2009. With the mine being so close, there are many additional services that serve Birtle and the surrounding communities. The Birdtail Oilfield has also offered a boost to the economy with revenue from oil rights as well and supporting industries. More aggressive drilling began taking place in 2010.

== Demographics ==
In the 2021 Census of Population conducted by Statistics Canada, Birtle had a population of 625 living in 285 of its 324 total private dwellings, a change of −2.6% from its 2016 population of 642. With a land area of 9.26 km^{2} (3.58 sq mi), it had a population density of 67.5/km^{2} (174.8/sq mi) in 2021.

== Notable people ==
- Rick Berry (b. 1978) – NHL player
- Bill Derlago (b. 1958) – NHL player
- Ron Low (b. 1950) – NHL goaltender and coach
