= Manitoba Provincial Road 261 =

Provincial Road in Manitoba, Canada

Provincial Road 261
- PR 261 highlighted in red

Route information
- Maintained by Department of Infrastructure
- Length: 61.0 km (37.9 mi)
- Existed: 1966–present

Major junctions
- West end: PTH 5 near Riding Mountain
- PR 462 in Glenella; PR 260 near Waldersee; PTH 50 in Amaranth
- East end: Dead end at Lake Manitoba

Location
- Country: Canada
- Province: Manitoba
- Rural municipalities: Rosedale, Glenella-Lansdowne, Alonsa

Highway system
- Provincial highways in Manitoba; Winnipeg City Routes
← PR 260	→ PR 262

Provincial Road 261 (PR 261) is a 61.0-kilometre-long (37.9 mi) east–west highway in the Parkland and Central Plains Regions of Manitoba. It provides a connection between the communities of Riding Mountain, Kelwood, Glenella, Waldersee, and Amaranth, as well as a link between Riding Mountain National Park and Lake Manitoba.

== Route description ==
PR 261 begins in the Rural Municipality of Rosedale at an intersection with PTH 5 (Parks Route), directly in between the community of Riding Mountain and Kelwood, as well as just east of Riding Mountain National Park. It heads east as a paved two-lane highway, entering the Municipality of Glenella-Lansdowne to travel through rural farmland for several kilometres to pass through Glenella, where it has an intersection with PR 462. After crossing a small stream, the highway goes through a switchback before coming to junction with PR 260 just north of Waldersee. Turning left here, the pavement ends and PR 261 continues as a two-lane gravel road into the Rural Municipality of Alonsa, travelling through more wooded areas before crossing PTH 50 (Kinosota Road) as it passes through the centre of Amaranth. PR 261 becomes paved again and travels along the northern edge of the Sandy Bay First Nation before coming to a dead end along the beaches of Lake Manitoba.

== Major intersections ==
Division	Location	km	mi	Destinations	Notes
Rosedale		0.0	0.0	PTH 5 (Parks Route) – Neepawa, McCreary	Western terminus
Glenella-Lansdowne	Glenella	19.5	12.1	PR 462 (Main Street) – Glenella, Plumas	
Glenella-Lansdowne		30.4	18.9	PR 260 south – Plumas	Northern terminus of PR 260; western end of unpaved section
Alonsa	Amaranth	54.2	33.7	PTH 50 (Kinosota Road) – Langruth, Alonsa	Eastern end of unpaved section
Sandy Bay First Nation / Alonsa		61.0	37.9	Lake Manitoba	Dead end at the beach; eastern terminus
1.000 mi = 1.609 km; 1.000 km = 0.621 mi
