= Manitoba Provincial Road 265 =

Provincial road in Manitoba, Canada

Provincial Road 265
- PR 265 highlighted in red

Route information
- Maintained by Department of Infrastructure
- Length: 80.6 km (50.1 mi)
- Existed: 1966–present

Major junctions
- West end: PR 262 near Clanwilliam
- PTH 5 in Eden; PR 352 near Eden; PR 260 in Plumas
- East end: PTH 50 in Langruth

Location
- Country: Canada
- Province: Manitoba
- Rural municipalities: Minto-Odanah, Rosedale, Glenella-Lansdowne, WestLake-Gladstone

Highway system
- Provincial highways in Manitoba; Winnipeg City Routes
← PR 264	→ PR 266

Provincial Road 265 (PR 265) is an 80.6-kilometre-long (50.1 mi) east–west road in the Westman and Central Plains Regions of Manitoba. Mostly a gravel road, it connects the communities of Clanwilliam, Polonia, Eden, Plumas, and Langruth, as well as providing a connection between Riding Mountain National Park and Lake Manitoba.

== Route description ==
PR 265 begins in the Rural Municipality of Minto-Odanah at an intersection with PR 262 just north of Clanwilliam, heading due east through farmland to enter the Rural Municipality of Rosedale and traverse a small river valley, where it passes through Polonia. The highway continues east across several small streams to enter the town of Eden, where it joins a short concurrency with PTH 5 (Parks Route) as it passes along the western side of town. Leaving Eden, PR 265 splits off heads east through rural farmland to enter the Municipality of Glenella-Lansdowne, crossing PR 352 between Birnie and Arden. It has an intersection with PR 462 before entering the Municipality of WestLake-Gladstone. PR 265 travels along the northern side of the town of Plumas along Queens Road and Clear Avenue, where it crosses a railroad, before joining a concurrency with PR 260 for few kilometres as their leaving town. PR 265 now traverses the swampy marshlands surrounding Jackfish Lake, where it crosses the Whitemud River, before entering the hamlet of Langruth, where it comes to and end at a junction with PTH 50 (Kinosota Road). The road continues east as Road 94N to the beaches of Lake Manitoba at Big Point. Besides the section within the town of Plumas, as well as the concurrencies with PTH 5 and PR 260, the entire length of Provincial Road 265 is a gravel, two-lane road.

== Major intersections ==
Division	Location	km	mi	Destinations	Notes
Minto-Odanah		0.0	0.0	PR 262 – Clanwilliam, Hilltop	Western terminus
Rosedale		11.6	7.2	Road 95W – Mountain Road	
Rosedale	Eden	25.1	15.6	PTH 5 south (Parks Route) – Neepawa; Road 93N – Eden	Western end of PTH 5 concurrency
Rosedale	Eden	25.9	16.1	1st Street N – Eden	
Rosedale		27.0	16.8	PTH 5 north (Parks Route) – McCreary	Eastern end of PTH 5 concurrency
Glenella-Lansdowne		36.3	22.6	PR 352 – Birnie, Arden	
Glenella-Lansdowne		46.7	29.0	PR 462 north – Glenella	Southern terminus of PR 462
WestLake-Gladstone	Plumas	54.9	34.1	PR 260 south (Clear Avenue) – Ogilvie	Western end of PR 260 concurrency
WestLake-Gladstone		56.6	35.2	PR 260 north – Waldersee	Eastern end of PR 260 concurrency
WestLake-Gladstone		69.8	43.4	Bridge over the Whitemud River	
WestLake-Gladstone	Langruth	80.6	50.1	PTH 50 (Kinosota Road) – Amaranth, Portage; Road 94N – Bog Point	Eastern terminus; road continues as Road 94N
1.000 mi = 1.609 km; 1.000 km = 0.621 mi: Concurrency terminus
