= Manitoba Provincial Road 305 =

Provincial road in Manitoba, Canada

Provincial Road 305
- PR 305 highlighted in red

Route information
- Maintained by Department of Infrastructure
- Length: 151.8 km (94.3 mi)

Major junctions
- West end: PTH 1 (TCH) / PTH 16 (TCH) / YH near Portage la Prairie
- PTH 2 near Ste. Claude; PTH 13 near Carman; PTH 3 at Brunkild; PTH 75 at Ste. Agathe
- East end: PTH 59 near Tourond

Location
- Country: Canada
- Province: Manitoba
- Rural municipalities: Dufferin; Hanover; Macdonald; Norfolk Treherne; Portage la Prairie; Ritchot

Highway system
- Provincial highways in Manitoba; Winnipeg City Routes
← PR 304	→ PR 306

Provincial Road 305 (PR 305) is a 151.8-kilometre-long (94.3 mi) east–west highway in the Central Plains and Pembina Valley regions of the Canadian province of Manitoba.

The road begins at the signal-controlled intersection of the Trans-Canada Highway (PTH 1) and Yellowhead Highway (PTH 16), west of Portage la Prairie. At first, it heads south, crossing PTH 2 near St. Claude, and then turns east. It passes through Brunkild before reaching PTH 75 at Ste. Agathe. PR 305 crosses the Red River at Ste. Agathe and then continues east to its end at PTH 59 near Tourond in the Rural Municipality of Hanover.

It is mostly a gravel road, except between the Trans-Canada Highway and PTH 2, and between PTH 75 and PTH 59, where it is a paved, two-lane road.

PR 305 near Tourond was used as a filming location for the 2014 direct-to-video film Joy Ride 3.

== Major intersections ==
Division	Location	km	mi	Destinations	Notes
Portage la Prairie		0.0	0.0	PTH 1 (TCH) / YH east – Mac Gregor, Portage la Prairie; PTH 16 (TCH) west / YH west – Neepawa	Western terminus; eastern terminus of PTH 16; road continues as both PTH 16 and Yellowhead Highway westbound
Portage la Prairie	Long Plain First Nation	13.2– 13.3	8.2– 8.3	Bridge over the Assiniboine River	
Norfolk Treherne		36.6	22.7	PTH 2 (Red Coat Trail) – St. Claude, Treherne	Western end of unpaved section
Dufferin		49.9	31.0	PR 240 – Roseisle, St. Claude	
Dufferin		56.4	35.0	PR 338 south / Old PR 338 north – Stephenfield, Haywood	Northern terminus of PR 338
Dufferin	Barnsley	74.6	46.4	PTH 13 – Elm Creek, Carman	
Dufferin		84.4	52.4	Road 18W – Homewood	
Dufferin		91.0	56.5	PR 248 north – Fannystelle	Southern terminus of PR 248
Macdonald		96.0	59.7	Road 11W – Sperling	Former PR 336 south
Macdonald	Brunkild	105.1	65.3	Bridge over the Morris River	
Macdonald	Brunkild	105.4	65.5	PTH 3 – Winnipeg, Carman	Eastern end of unpaved section
Macdonald	Brunkild	105.8	65.7	PR 332 – Starbuck, Lowe Farm	Western end of unpaved section
Macdonald		122.8	76.3	PR 330 north – Domain	Western end of PR 330 concurrency; eastern end of unpaved section
Macdonald		124.7	77.5	PR 330 south – Osborne	Eastern end of PR 330 concurrency; western end of unpaved section
Ritchot	Ste. Agathe	136.6	84.9	PTH 75 (Lord Selkirk Highway) – Winnipeg, Morris	Eastern end of unpaved section
Ritchot	Ste. Agathe	137.0– 137.3	85.1– 85.3	Bridge over the Red River	
Ritchot		138.1	85.8	PR 200 (St. Mary's Road) – St. Adolphe, Dominion City	
Ritchot		140.7– 140.8	87.4– 87.5	Bridge over the Rat River	
Hanover		147.7	91.8	Loeppky Road – Niverville	
Hanover		151.8	94.3	PTH 59 – Ile des Chênes, St-Pierre-Jolys	Eastern terminus; road continues as Clear Springs Road
1.000 mi = 1.609 km; 1.000 km = 0.621 mi: Concurrency terminus
