= Manitoba Highway 2 =

Highway in Manitoba, Canada

Provincial Trunk Highway 2
- Red Coat Trail
- PTH 2 highlighted in red.

Route information
- Maintained by Manitoba Infrastructure
- Length: 314.1 km (195.2 mi)
- Existed: 1928–present

Major junctions
- West end: Highway 13 at Saskatchewan border near Sinclair
- PTH 83 at Pipestone; PTH 21 near Deleau; PTH 22 at Souris; PTH 10 near Nesbitt; PTH 18 near Wawanesa; PTH 5 at Glenboro; PTH 34 at Holland; PTH 13 at Elm Creek; PTH 3 at Oak Bluff
- East end: PTH 100 (TCH) near Oak Bluff

Location
- Country: Canada
- Province: Manitoba
- Rural municipalities: Pipestone; Sifton; Souris – Glenwood; Oakland – Wawanesa; Glenboro – South Cypress; Victoria; Norfolk Treherne; Grey; Macdonald

Highway system
- Provincial highways in Manitoba; Winnipeg City Routes
← PTH 1A	→ PTH 3

Provincial Trunk Highway 2 (PTH 2) is a 315-kilometre (196-mile) highway in the Canadian province of Manitoba. It runs from Highway 13 at the Manitoba-Saskatchewan border to Winnipeg's Perimeter Highway near Oak Bluff.

PTH 2 is the Manitoba portion of the Red Coat Trail.

== Route description ==
PTH 2 begins in the Rural Municipality of Pipestone at the Saskatchewan border, with the road, and the Red Coat Trail, continuing west as Saskatchewan Highway 13 (Hwy 13) towards the town of Redvers. The highway heads east, along with the Red Coat Trail, to pass along the northern edge of Sinclair, where it shares a 4-kilometre-long (2.5 mi) concurrency (overlap) with PR 256, before making a sharp curve to the south, then another to the east as it passes through Linklater. It now passes through the town of Reston and the community of Pipestone, where it has an intersection with PTH 83, before crossing into the Rural Municipality of Sifton.

PTH 2 pass just a few kilometres to the south of Oak Lake as it travels through the communities of Findlay and Deleau, where it has an intersection with PR 254 and have a several kilometer long concurrency with PTH 21, which involves a sharp curve to the north, then the east. The highway crosses into the Municipality of Souris - Glenwood at the second intersection with PTH 21.

PTH 2 has an intersection with PR 347 before crossing Plum Creek to enter Souris. The highway crosses a railroad track and passes through neighbourhoods before having an intersection with PTH 22 and PR 250 at the northern edge of downtown. It begins paralleling the Souris River and leaves Souris as it passes along the south side of Souris Glenwood Industrial Air Park and crosses another railroad track. Shortly thereafter, the highway crosses into the Municipality of Oakland - Wawanesa at an intersection with PR 348.

PTH 2 passes just to the north of Carroll before having a short concurrency with PTH 10 (also known as the John Bracken Highway), where it crosses yet another railroad track. It heads east to pass on the southern edge of Nesbitt, where it has an intersection with PR 346, before curving southeast, having an intersection with PR 344 and crossing the Souris River for the second and final time. The highway travels along the southern edge of Wawanesa, having intersections with Tenterfield Road (which leads to Dunrea) and PR 340 (which leads to Wawanesa proper), before crossing into the Municipality of Glenboro - South Cypress.

PTH 2 makes a sharp curve to the south, then east, to have intersections with PTH 18 and PR 530, before heading due eastward to cross a creek and pass through Glenboro, where it junctions with PTH 5 (Parks Route). Entering the Rural Municipality of Victoria at an intersection with PR 342, The highway travels along the northern edge of Cypress River, where it crosses the river of the same name.

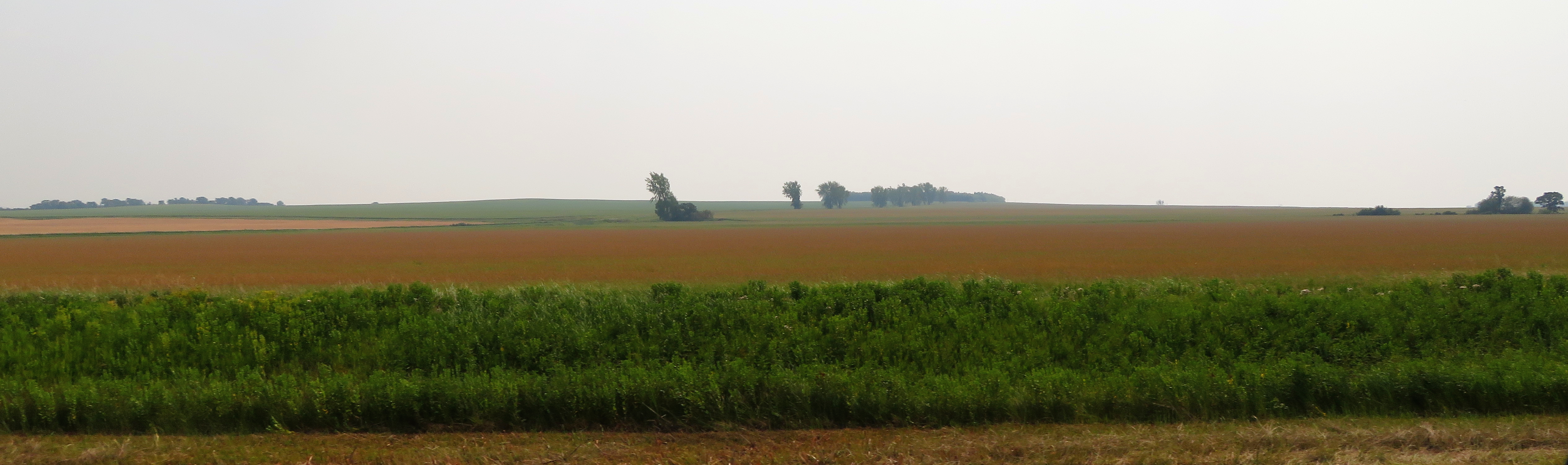
Typical scenery along PTH 2, taken here between Holland and Treherne

PTH 2 curves more northeastward as it passes through Holland, where it has an intersection with PTH 34 and parallels a former railroad line, before entering the Municipality of Norfolk Treherne. The highway becomes more curvy as it passes through Treherne, where it has a concurrency with PR 242, and Rathwell, where it junctions with PR 244, before crossing into the Rural Municipality of Grey.

PTH 2 crosses PR 305 before going through a switchback and travelling through St. Claude, where it crosses PR 240. It goes through another switchback as follows along the northern and eastern edges of Haywood before travelling through Elm Creek, where it has intersections with PTH 13 and PR 247, as well as crossing over a railroad track. The highway continues northeast to pass through the communities of Culross and Fannystelle, where it has an intersection with PR 248, before entering the Rural Municipality of Macdonald.

PTH 2 passes through Starbuck, where it has an intersection with PR 332 and crosses the La Salle River, before heading due east to have an intersection with PR 424 and a short concurrency with PR 334. The highway now travels along the southern edge of Oak Bluff, where it meets PTH 3 at a roundabout shortly before PTH 2, and the Red Coat Trail, both come to an end at an intersection with PTH 100 (South Perimeter Highway / Trans-Canada Highway).

The entire length of Provincial Trunk Highway 2 is a rural, two-lane highway travelling through the relatively flat prairies of southern Manitoba.

== History ==
During the 1950s, PTH 2 was cosigned with PTH 3 and followed McGillivray Boulevard to PTH 75 (Pembina Highway) in the then separate municipality of Fort Garry, which was amalgamated into Winnipeg in 1971. When the South Perimeter Highway was completed in 1958, PTH 2 was moved to its present-day alignment.

== Photo gallery ==
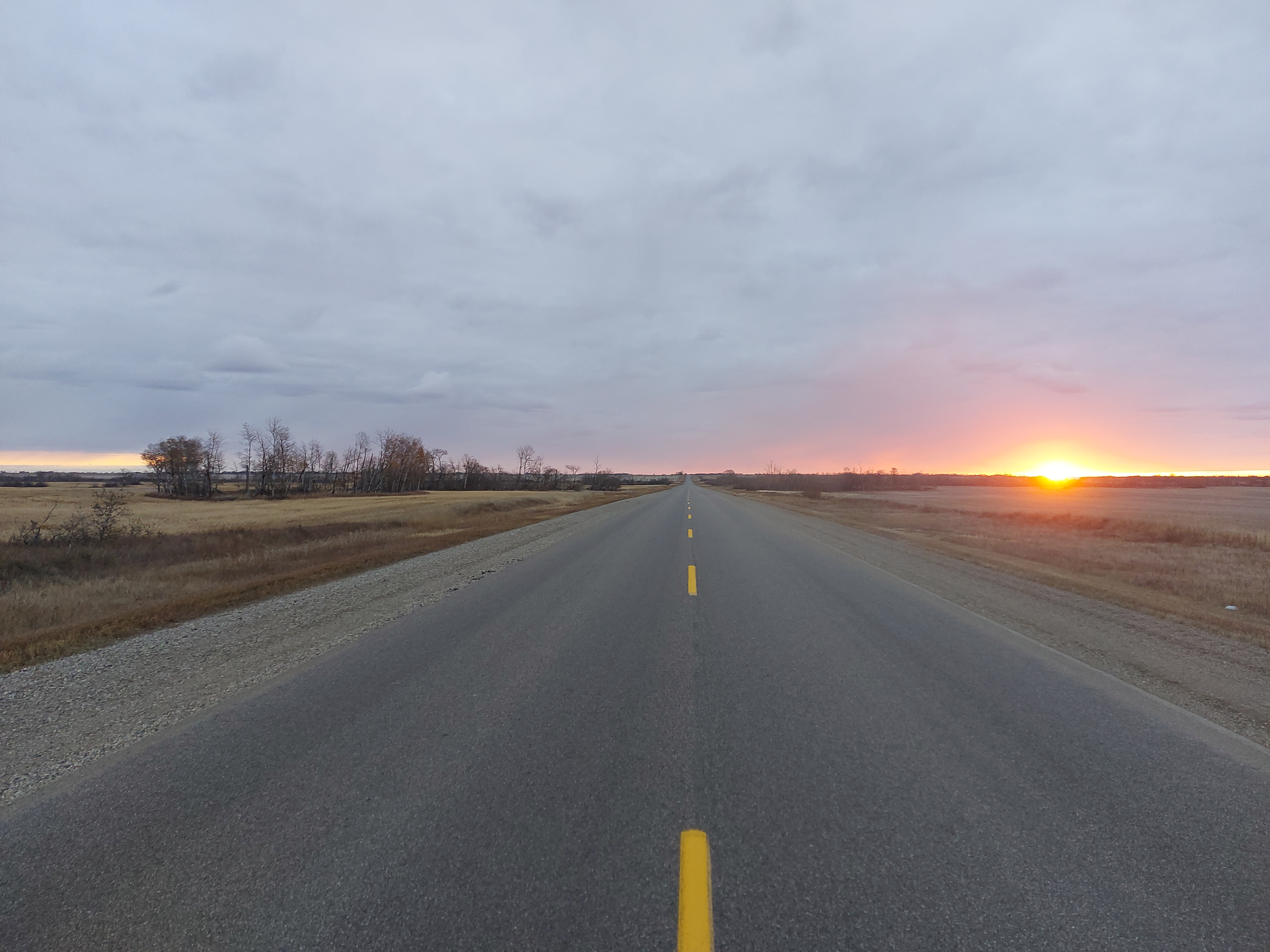
PTH 2 in the RM of Pipestone

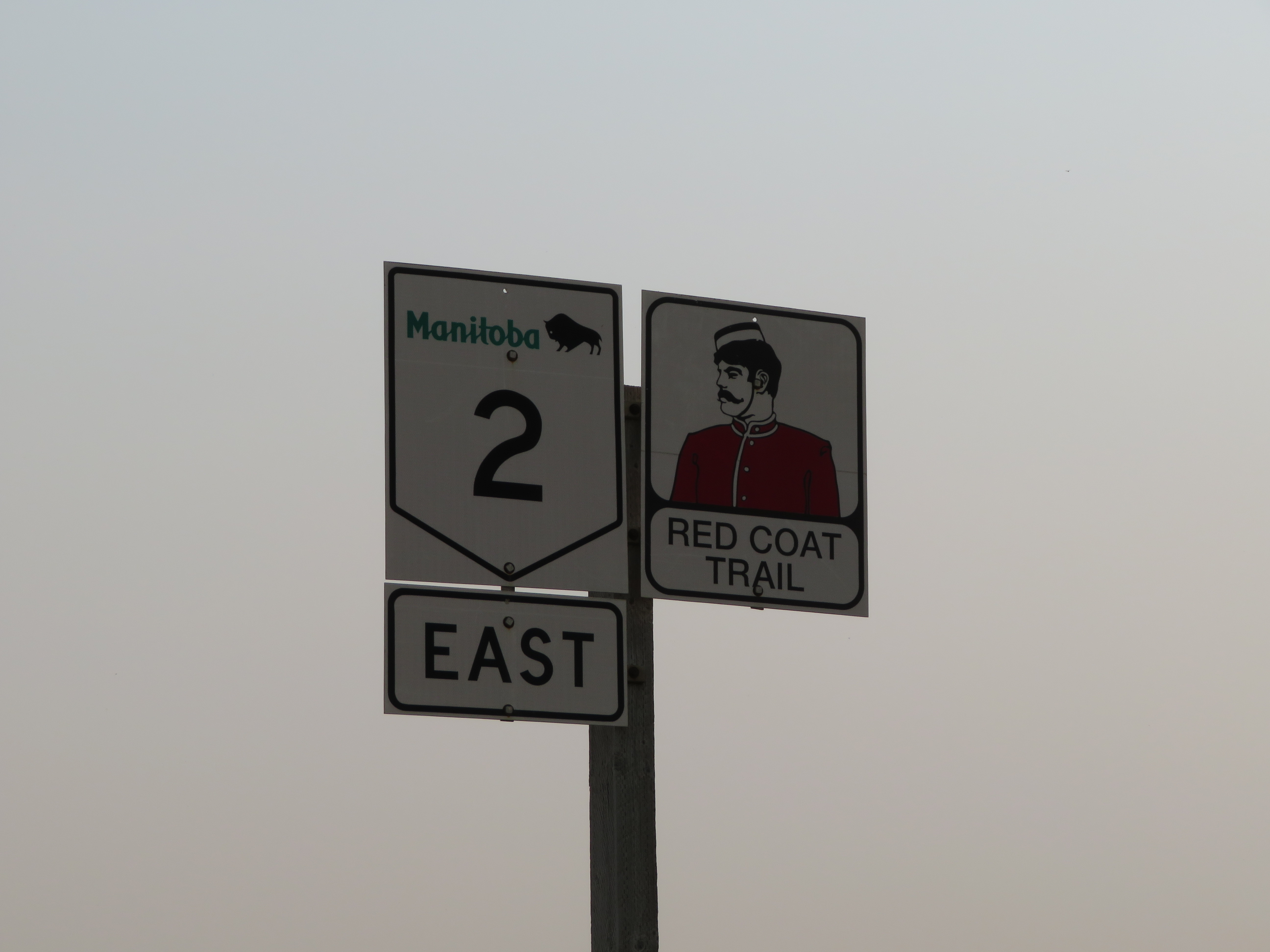
Typical guide signage along PTH 2

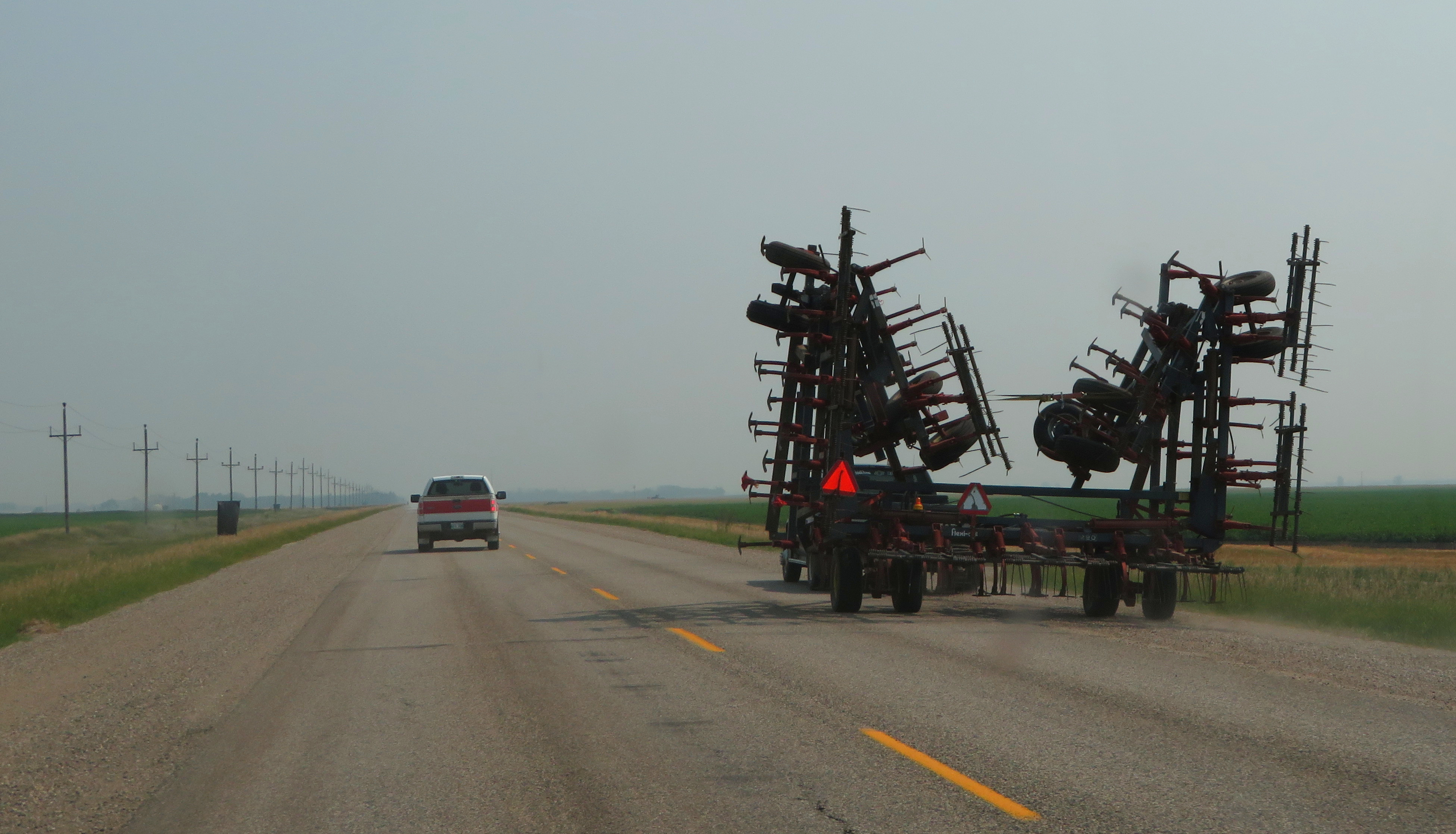
Shot of PTH 2 during the summer

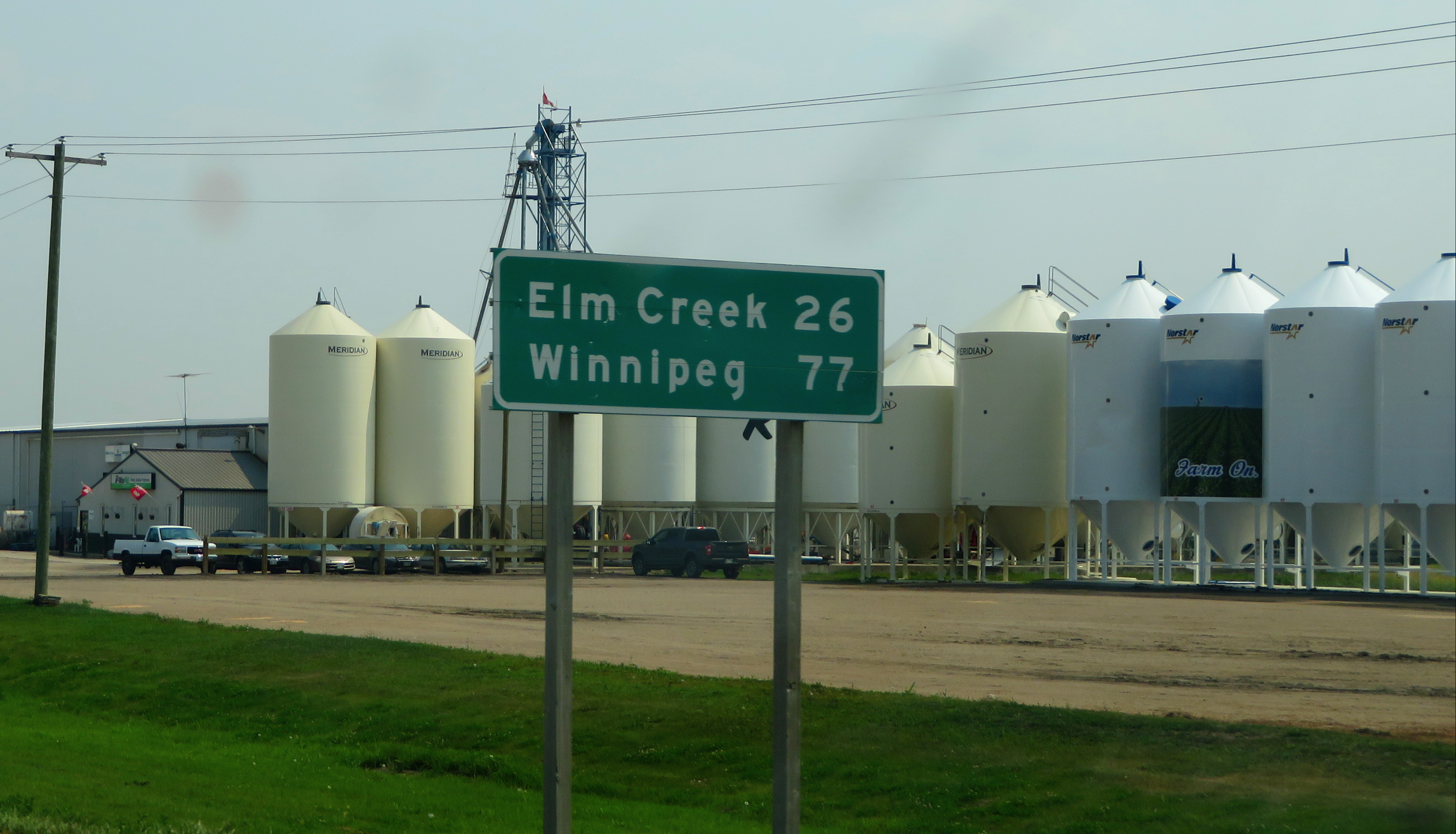
Distance sign along PTH 2 between St. Claude and Elm Creek

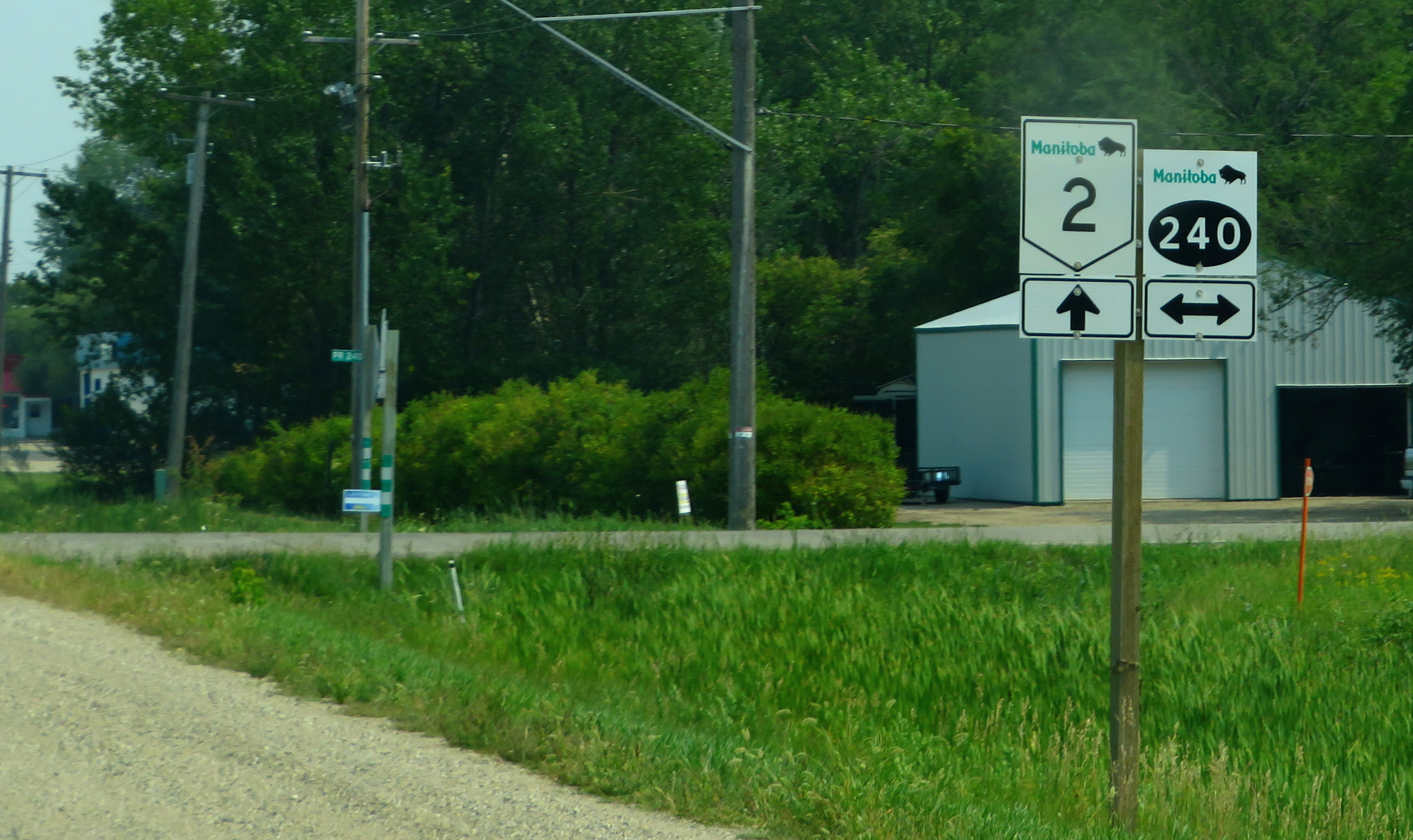
PTH 2 in St. Claude

== Major intersections ==
Division	Location	km	mi	Destinations	Notes
Pipestone		0.0	0.0	Highway 13 west (Red Coat Trail) – Redvers, Weyburn	Continuation into Saskatchewan
Pipestone	Sinclair	9.0	5.6	PR 256 south – Tilston	West end of PR 256 concurrency
Pipestone		13.1	8.1	PR 256 north – Cromer	East end of PR 256 concurrency
Pipestone	Reston	24.2	15.0	Road 160 West	Former PR 252 south
Pipestone		25.8	16.0	Road 159 West	Former PR 252 north
Pipestone	Pipestone	34.0	21.1	PTH 83 – Virden, Melita	
Sifton	Deleau	59.0	36.7	PR 254 – Oak Lake Beach, Lauder	
Sifton		65.6	40.8	PTH 21 south – Hartney	West end of PTH 21 concurrency
Sifton–Souris – Glenwood boundary		73.8	45.9	PTH 21 north – Griswold	East end of PTH 21 concurrency
Souris – Glenwood		77.1	47.9	PR 347 east	Former PR 454 south
Souris – Glenwood	Souris	88.6	55.1	PTH 22 south / PR 250 north (1st Street) – Elgin, Alexander	
Souris – Glenwood–Oakland – Wawanesa boundary		103.3	64.2	PR 348 north	
Oakland – Wawanesa		105.0	65.2	1st Street – Carroll	
Oakland – Wawanesa		110.0	68.4	PTH 10 north (John Bracken Highway) – Brandon	West end of PTH 10 concurrency
Oakland – Wawanesa		114.3	71.0	PTH 10 south (John Bracken Highway) – Boissevain	East end of PTH 10 concurrency
Oakland – Wawanesa	Nesbitt	120.9	75.1	PR 346 south – Margaret	
Oakland – Wawanesa	Nesbitt	121.4	75.4	Main Street – Nesbitt	
Oakland – Wawanesa		129.1	80.2	PR 344 east – Wawanesa	
Oakland – Wawanesa		134.4	83.5	Tenterfield Road – Dunrea	Former PR 344 south
Oakland – Wawanesa		135.3	84.1	PR 340 north – Wawanesa	Former PR 344 north
Glenboro – South Cypress		139.6	86.7	PTH 18 south – Killarney	
Glenboro – South Cypress		142.0	88.2	PR 530 north	
Glenboro – South Cypress		151.9	94.4	Road 88 West – Stockton	Former PR 340 north
Glenboro – South Cypress		155.1	96.4	Road 86 West – Belmont	Former PR 340 south
Glenboro – South Cypress	Glenboro	165.0	102.5	PTH 5 (Parks Route) – Carberry, Baldur, Cartwright	Former PR 258
Glenboro – South Cypress–Victoria boundary	Cypress River	180	110	PR 342 south – Glenora	
Victoria	Holland	195.4	121.4	PTH 34 – Austin, Pilot Mound	
Norfolk Treherne	Treherne	209.3	130.1	PR 242 south – Somerset	West end of PR 242 concurrency
Norfolk Treherne		212.6	132.1	PR 242 north – Rossendale	East end of PR 242 concurrency
Norfolk Treherne	Rathwell	219.6	136.5	PR 244 south – Notre-Dame-de-Lourdes	
Norfolk Treherne		227.8	141.5	PR 305 – Long Plain	
Grey	St. Claude	234.8	145.9	PR 240 – Portage la Prairie, Roseisle, St. Claude	
Grey		241.3	149.9	Road 35 West	Former PR 338 south
Grey		247.1	153.5	Old 338 Road 32 West – Haywood	Former PR 338 north
Grey	Elm Creek	250.2	155.5	PTH 13 – Oakville, Carman	
Grey		261.8	162.7	PR 247 east – Sanford	
Grey	Fannystelle	278.7	173.2	PR 248 – Elie	
Macdonald	Starbuck	290.8	180.7	PR 332 – Dacotah, Brunkild	
Macdonald		299.0	185.8	PR 424 north – Springstein	
Macdonald		302.3	187.8	PR 334 south – Sanford	West end of PR 334 concurrency
Macdonald		305.5	189.8	PR 334 north – Headingley	East end of PR 334 concurrency
Macdonald	Oak Bluff	311.6	193.6	PTH 3 to PTH 100 (TCH) west / Route 155 east – Winnipeg, Carman	
Macdonald	Oak Bluff			PTH 100 (TCH) (Perimeter Highway) / McGillivray Boulevard to Route 155 east	Proposed realignment and interchange
Macdonald		314.1	195.2	PTH 100 (TCH) east (Perimeter Highway) – Kenora	PTH 2 eastern terminus; no access to PTH 100 west
1.000 mi = 1.609 km; 1.000 km = 0.621 mi: Concurrency terminus; Incomplete access; Proposed; Route transition

== Related route ==
Provincial Road 530
- Location: South of Treesbank
- Length: 7.3 km (4.5 mi)
- Existed: 1992–present

Provincial Road 530 (PR 530) is a 7.3-kilometre-long (4.5 mi) spur of PTH 2 in the Municipality of Glenboro-South Cypress, previously connecting it to the hamlet of Treesbank prior to the Souris River bridge collapse during the 2011 Souris River flood. At its northern end, including the former bridge, PR 530 follows a former section of PR 340. The entire length of PR 530 is a rural two-lane gravel road.

Between 1966 and 1992, PR 530 was designated along an entirely different route, running 9.9 kilometres (6.2 mi) from PR 245 in Bruxelles to PTH 23 along the border of the Swan Lake First Nation, all within the Municipality of Lorne along Road 64W.

The entire route is in the Municipality of Glenboro – South Cypress.

Location	km	mi	Destinations	Notes
	0.0	0.0	PTH 2 (Red Coat Trail) – Souris, Treherne	Southern terminus; road continues south as Mooney Road (Road 94W)
	6.5	4.0	Road 42W – Stockton	Former PR 340 south
	7.3	4.5	Concrete Bowstring Arch Bridge No. 412 across Souris River	
Treesbank	8.1	5.0	Norfolk Street to PR 340 – Treesbank; Road 94W – Treesbank Ferry	Former northern terminus prior to 2011; former PR 340 followed Norfolk Street (originally PR 451 prior to 1989) to meet its current alignment
1.000 mi = 1.609 km; 1.000 km = 0.621 mi: Closed/former
