= Manitoba Provincial Road 260 =

Provincial Road in Manitoba, Canada

Provincial Road 260
- PR 260 highlighted in red

Route information
- Maintained by Department of Infrastructure
- Length: 40.9 km (25.4 mi)
- Existed: 1966–present

Major junctions
- South end: PTH 16 (TCH) / YH near Gladstone
- PR 265 in Plumas
- North end: PR 261 near Waldersee

Location
- Country: Canada
- Province: Manitoba
- Rural municipalities: WestLake-Gladstone, Glenella-Lansdowne

Highway system
- Provincial highways in Manitoba; Winnipeg City Routes
← PR 259	→ PR 261

Provincial Road 260 (PR 260) is a 40.9-kilometre-long (25.4 mi) north–south highway in the Central Plains Region of Manitoba. It connects the communities of Gladstone and Keyes with Ogilvie, Plumas, Waldersee, Tenby, and via PR 261, Amaranth and the western shore of Lake Manitoba.

== Route description ==
PR 260 begins in the Municipality of WestLake-Gladstone at a junction with PTH 16 (Yellowhead Highway), directly in between Keyes and the town of Gladstone. Almost immediately crossing a railroad, it heads due north through rural farmland for several kilometres to cross a railroad at Ogilvie before travelling along the eastern side of Plumas, where it shares a short concurrency with PR 265. Entering the Municipality of Glenella-Lansdowne, the highway continues north to have an intersection with its spur route to Tenby, PR 575, before travelling through Waldersee and crossing a creek. PR 260 comes to an end shortly thereafter at an intersection with PR 261. The entire length of Provincial Road 260 is a paved, two-lane highway.

== Major intersections ==
Division	Location	km	mi	Destinations	Notes
WestLake-Gladstone		0.0	0.0	PTH 16 (TCH) / YH – Gladstone, Neepawa	Southern terminus
WestLake-Gladstone		1.7	1.1	Road 84N – Keyes	
WestLake-Gladstone	Ogilvie	8.0	5.0	Road 88N – Ogilvie	
WestLake-Gladstone	Plumas	17.5	10.9	Jordan Street – Plumas	
WestLake-Gladstone	Plumas	18.0	11.2	PR 265 west – Eden	Southern end of PR 265 concurrency
WestLake-Gladstone		19.6	12.2	PR 265 east – Langruth	Northern end of PR 265 concurrency
Glenella-Lansdowne		32.7	20.3	PR 575 west – Tenby	Eastern terminus of PR 575
Glenella-Lansdowne		40.9	25.4	PR 261 – Amaranth, Glenella	Northern terminus
1.000 mi = 1.609 km; 1.000 km = 0.621 mi: Concurrency terminus

== Related route ==
Provincial Road 575
- Road 102N
- Location: Tenby
- Length: 6.5 km (4.0 mi)
- Existed: 1966–present

Provincial Road 575 (PR 575) is a short 6.5-kilometre-long (4.0 mi) east-west spur of PR 260 in the Municipality of Glenella-Lansdowne, serving as a connection to the hamlet Tenby. It is entirely a two-lane gravel road, with no other major intersections or settlements along the route. PR 575 lies entirely along Road 102N and includes one railway crossing near its western end.

Prior to 1992, PR 575 extended west a further 23.4 kilometres (14.5 mi), following Road 102N past Tenby to join PR 462 in a short concurrency just south of Glenella. It then split off along Road 100N, heading due west through rural farmland for several kilometres before making a sharp left onto Road 83W, coming to an end at a junction with PR 352 just east of Birnie.

Division	Location	km	mi	Destinations	Notes
Glenella-Lansdowne	Tenby	0.0	0.0	Road 102N to PR 462 – Glenella; Railway Street – Tenby	Western terminus; road continues west as Road 102N
Glenella-Lansdowne		6.5	4.0	PR 260 – Waldersee, Plumas	Eastern terminus; road continues east as Road 102N
1.000 mi = 1.609 km; 1.000 km = 0.621 mi
