= Manitoba Provincial Road 248 =

Provincial road in Manitoba, Canada

Provincial Road 248
- PR 248 highlighted in red

Route information
- Maintained by Department of Infrastructure
- Length: 76.1 km (47.3 mi)
- Existed: 1966–present

Major junctions
- North end: PTH 6 near Woodlands
- PTH 26 near St. Eustache; PTH 1 (TCH) / YH at Elie; PTH 2 at Fannystelle
- South end: PR 305 near Brunkild

Location
- Country: Canada
- Province: Manitoba
- Rural municipalities: Cartier; Dufferin; Grey; Rosser; St. François Xavier; Woodlands

Highway system
- Provincial highways in Manitoba; Winnipeg City Routes
← PR 247	→ PR 250

Provincial Road 248 (PR 248) is a north-south provincial road in the Pembina Valley and Central Plains regions of the Canadian province of Manitoba.

It runs from PTH 6 southward, crossing the Assiniboine River near PTH 26, where it ends, to the Trans-Canada Highway (PTH 1) at Elie. The junction of PTH 1 and PR 248 is one of only two signal-controlled intersections on the Trans-Canada Highway between Headingley and Brandon. From Elie, PR 248 continues southward, intersecting PTH 2 at Fannystelle, and ending at PR 305.

PR 248 is mostly a paved, two-lane road, except for the southernmost portion between PTH 2 and PR 305.

== History ==
Provincial Road 306
- Location: Rosetown - Kane
- Length: 36.1 km (22.4 mi)
- Existed: 1992–present

Prior to 1992, PR 248 extended further south for an additional 72.2 kilometres (44.9 mi) through the Rural Municipalities of Dufferin, Roland, and Rhineland, via a short concurrency (overlap) with PR 305, crossing PTH 3 near Homewood, a short concurrency with PTH 23 between Myrtle and Kane, and using the entire length of what is now PR 306 through Plum Coulee to meet its southern terminus at PR 243 (Boundary Commission Trail), just 3 kilometres (1.9 mi) north of the United States border.

== Major intersections ==
Division	Location	km	mi	Destinations	Notes
Dufferin		0.0	0.0	PR 305 – Brunkild, Barnsley	Southern terminus; southern end of unpaved section
Dufferin / Grey boundary		3.3	2.1	Bridge over the Morris River	
Grey		8.2	5.1	PR 247 – Elm Creek, Sanford	
Grey	Fannystelle	16.7	10.4	PTH 2 (Red Coat Trail) – Winnipeg, Treherne	Northern end of unpaved section
Cartier		29.0	18.0	James Valley Road – James Valley Hutterite Colony	
Cartier		32.2	20.0	Bridge over the La Salle River	
Cartier	Elie	35.8	22.2	PTH 1 (TCH) / YH – Brandon, Winnipeg	
Cartier		41.7	25.9	PR 424 south – Headingley	Northern terminus of PR 424; former PR 241 west
Cartier		43.4	27.0	Main Street – St. Eustache	
Cartier / St. Francois Xavier boundary		47.5– 47.6	29.5– 29.6	Baie St. Paul Bridge over the Assiniboine River	
St. Francois Xavier		47.9	29.8	PTH 26 west (Chemin Assiniboine Trail) – Poplar Point	Southern end of PTH 26 concurrency
St. Francois Xavier		49.4	30.7	PTH 26 east (Chemin Assiniboine Trail) – St. Francois Xavier	Northern end of PTH 26 concurrency
Rosser	No major junctions				
Woodlands	Marquette	54.9	34.1	PR 221 east – Meadows	Western terminus of PR 221
Woodlands	Meadow Lea	61.5	38.2	PR 227 – Oakland, Warren	
Woodlands		74.6	46.4	PR 411 – St. Ambroise, Woodlands	
Woodlands		76.1	47.3	PTH 6 (NWWR) – St. Laurent, Lake Francis, Woodlands	Northern terminus
1.000 mi = 1.609 km; 1.000 km = 0.621 mi: Concurrency terminus
