= Manitoba Provincial Road 462 =

Provincial road in Manitoba, Canada

Provincial Road 462

Route information
- Maintained by Department of Infrastructure
- Length: 57.9 km (36.0 mi)
- Existed: 1966–present

Major junctions
- South end: PR 265 near Plumas
- PR 261 in Glenella

Location
- Country: Canada
- Province: Manitoba
- Rural municipalities: Glenella-Lansdowne, Alonsa, McCreary

Highway system
- Provincial highways in Manitoba; Winnipeg City Routes
← PR 459	→ PR 463

Provincial Road 462 (PR 462) is a 57.9-kilometre-long (36.0 mi) north–south highway in both the Parkland and Central Plains regions of Manitoba. It connects the towns of Plumas and McCreary via Glenella.

== Route description ==
PR 462 begins in the Municipality of Glenella-Lansdowne at an intersection with PR 265 just west of the town of Plumas, heading north along Road 75W as a two-lane gravel road through a mix of farmland wooded areas to traverse a switchback, where it junctions with both Road 100N and Road 102N (former PR 575, Road 102N provides access to nearby Tenby). After crossing a creek and Road 105N, where it becomes paved, the highway enters the town of Glenella as it crosses a railway and heads through downtown along Main Street. After travelling through a neighbourhood and having an intersection with PR 261, the pacemaker transitions back to gravel as PR 462 winds its way northward to cross a small creek and enter the Rural Municipality of Alonsa. The highway makes a sudden sharp left onto Road 112N, heading west into the Municipality of McCreary to travel through Glencairn and cross the railway for a second time. It makes a sudden right onto Road 81W, heading north through road rural farmland to have a third railroad crossing before making a left onto Road 116N and zig-zagging through the locality of Reeve. After having its forth and final railway crossing, PR 462 comes to and end just south of the town of McCreary at an intersection with PTH 5 (Parks Route).

== Major intersections ==
Division	Location	km	mi	Destinations	Notes
Glenella-Lansdowne		0.0	0.0	PR 265 – Eden, Plumas	Southern terminus; road continues south as Road 75W
Glenella-Lansdowne		9.8	6.1	Road 100N – Birnie	Former PR 575 west
Glenella-Lansdowne		13.7	8.5	Road 102N to PR 575 – Tenby	Former PR 575 east
Glenella-Lansdowne	Glenella	18.6	11.6	Road 105N	Southern end of paved section
Glenella-Lansdowne	Glenella	20.3	12.6	PR 261 – Riding Mountain, Amaranth	Northern end of paved section
Alonsa		30.5	19.0	Road 75W to PTH 50 – Alonsa	
McCreary		57.9	36.0	PTH 5 (Parks Route) – Neepawa, McCreary	Northern terminus; road continues west as Road 117N
1.000 mi = 1.609 km; 1.000 km = 0.621 mi
