= Glenella =

Glenella can refer to:

- Municipality of Glenella – Lansdowne, a rural municipality in Manitoba, Canada
  - Glenella, Manitoba, an unincorporated community within the rural municipality
  - Glenella railway station, a railway station in the rural municipality
- Glenella, Queensland, a town in Australia
