= Rural Municipality of Glenella =

Rural municipality in Manitoba, Canada

Coordinates: 50°34′21″N 99°07′24″W

The Rural Municipality of Glenella is a former rural municipality (RM) in the Canadian province of Manitoba. It was originally incorporated as a rural municipality on April 10, 1920. It ceased on January 1, 2015, as a result of its provincially mandated amalgamation with the RM of Lansdowne to form the Municipality of Glenella – Lansdowne.

The RM had a population of 555 in 1996 and 518 in 2001. It was situated west of Lake Manitoba, northeast of Brandon and northwest of Winnipeg. Provincial Road 261 was slightly north of Glenella.

== Communities ==
- Glenella
- Grass River
- Waldersee
