= Central Plains Region =

Region of Manitoba

Coordinates: 50°05′09″N 98°16′41″W

- Region of Manitoba
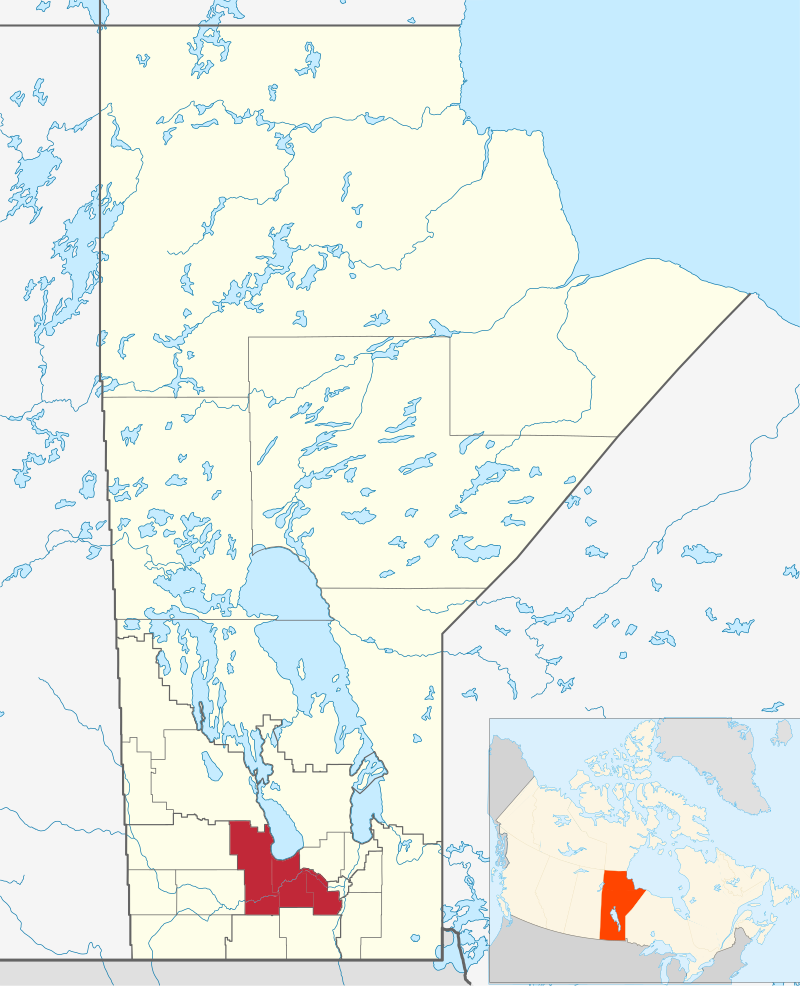
- Map of the Central Plains Region in Manitoba.
- Country: Canada
- Province: Manitoba

Area
  - Total: 10,655.94 km^{2} (4,114.28 sq mi)

Population (2021)
  - Total: 51,129
  - Density: 4.7982/km^{2} (12.427/sq mi)

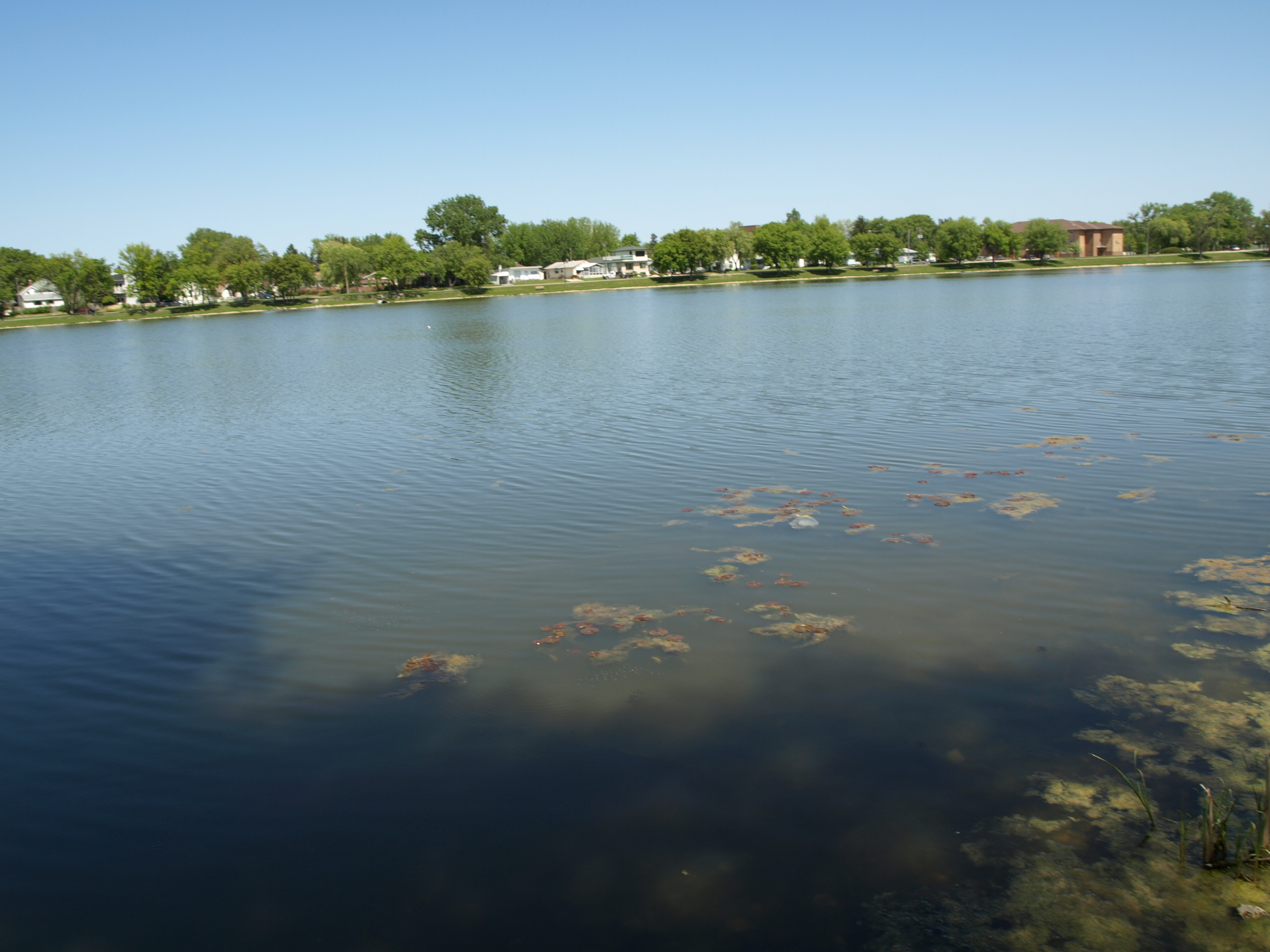
Crescent Lake in Portage la Prairie

The Central Plains Region (French: Région des plaines centrales) is an informal geographic region of the Canadian province of Manitoba located in the south central part of the Canadian province of Manitoba, directly west of Winnipeg.

Its major urban centre is the City of Portage la Prairie. Together with the Pembina Valley Region to the south, the Central Plains Region composes the broader cultural region of Central Manitoba. Geographically, the region is considered to be a part of southern Manitoba, and is serviced by the Southern Regional Health Authority.

As of the 2016 census, the region had a population of 50,300 (compared to 48,289 in the 2001 census).

== Major communities ==
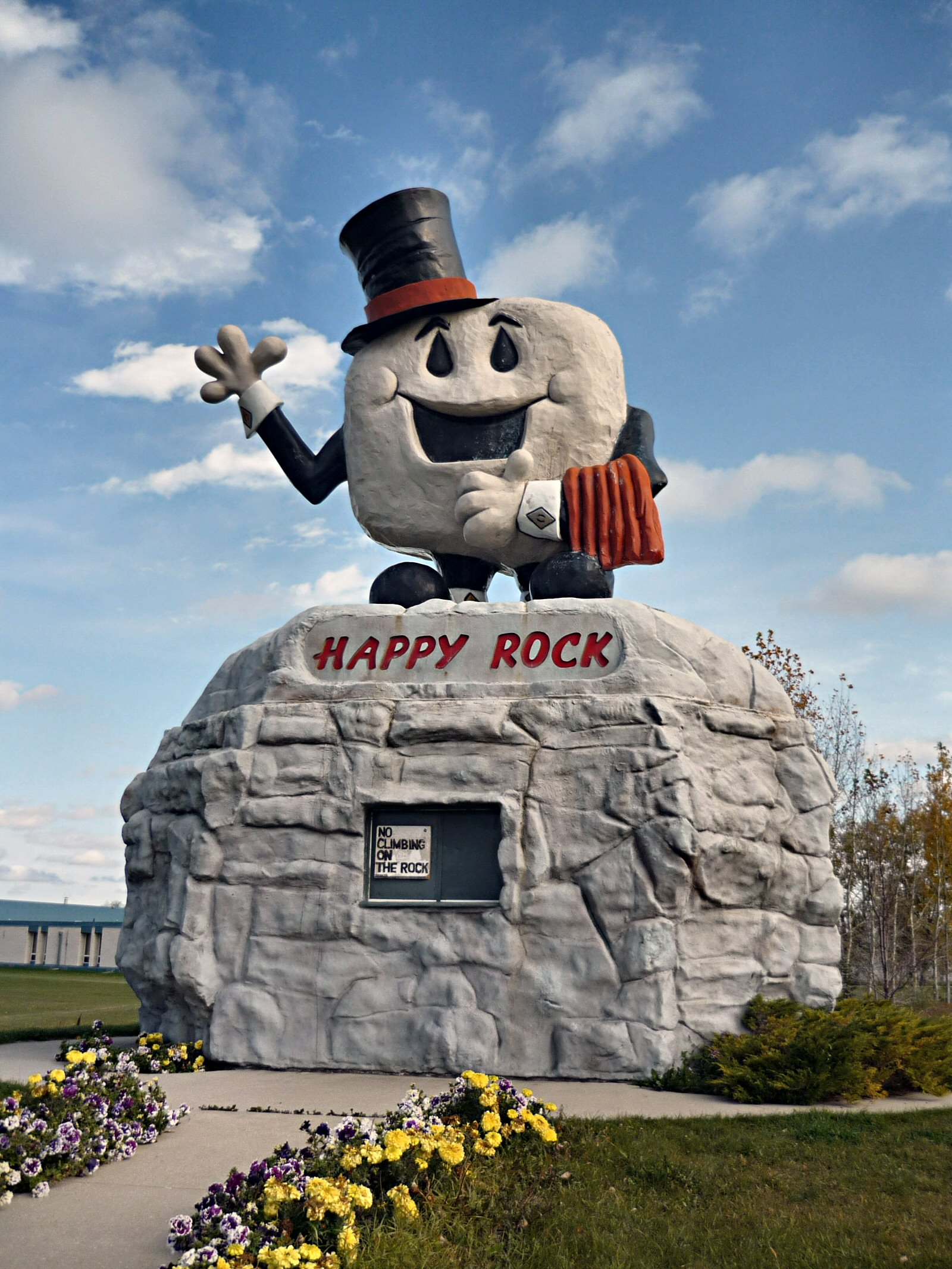
Happy Rock in Gladstone

- Portage la Prairie (city)

=== Rural municipalities and communities ===
Rural municipality	Unincorporated communities	Census division
Cartier	Elie (local urban district); St. Eustache; Springstein (hamlet)	No. 10
Grey	Culross; Elm Creek (local urban district); Fannystelle; Haywood (local urban district); St. Claude (local urban district)	No. 9
Glenella-Lansdowne	Glenella; Waldersee	No. 8
Lorne	Notre-Dame-de-Lourdes (local urban district)	No. 8 (partly in No. 4)
Macdonald	Brunkild; Domain; La Salle; Oak Bluff; Osborne; Sanford; Starbuck	No. 10
Norfolk Treherne	Rathwell; Treherne	No. 8
North Norfolk	Arizona; Austin (local urban district); Bagot; MacGregor; Sidney	No. 8
Portage la Prairie	Bloom; Curtis; Delta Beach; Edwin; Fortier; Fulton; High Bluff; Layland; Longburn; Macdonald; Newton; Oakland; Oakville (local urban district); Poplar Point; Rignold; St. Ambroise; Southport	No. 9
St. François Xavier	Dacotah; St. Francois Xavier; White Horse Plains	No. 10
Victoria	Cypress River (local urban district); Holland (local urban district)	No. 8
WestLake – Gladstone	Gladstone (unincorporated urban community); Plumas (local urban district); Westbourne	No. 8

=== First Nations and reserves ===
- Dakota Plains First Nation (Dakota Plains 6A, Dakota Tipi 1)
- Long Plain First Nation
- Sandy Bay 5

== Points of interest ==
- Parks and wetlands
  - Delta Marsh
  - Portage Spillway Provincial Park
  - Spruce Woods Provincial Park
  - St. Ambroise Beach Provincial Park
  - Stephenfield Provincial Park
  - Twin Lakes Beach
  - Yellow Quill Provincial Park
- Other
  - Manitoba Agricultural Museum
  - Prairie Wind Music Festival
- Transport
  - Portage la Prairie/Southport Airport
    - 3 Canadian Forces Flying Training School
    - KF Defence Programs
  - Portage la Prairie (North) Airport
  - Manitoba Highway 13
  - Manitoba Highway 100
  - Provincial Road 242
  - Provincial Road 248
  - Provincial Road 305
