= Alana Levandoski =

Canadian musician

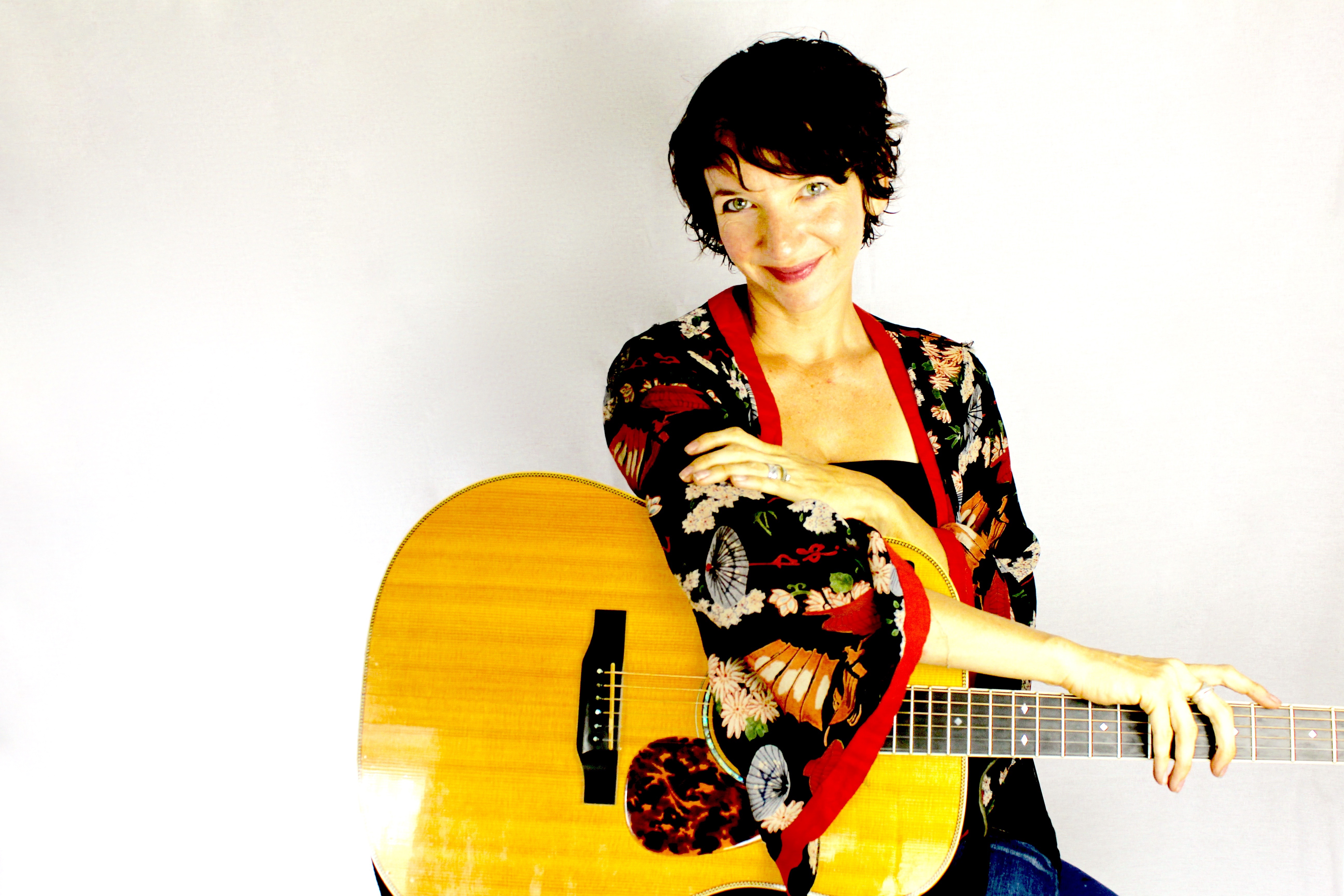
- Alana Levandoski in 2015

Background information
- Born: Kelwood, Manitoba, Canada
- Genres: Folk
- Occupations: Songwriter, musician
- Instrument: Guitar
- Labels: Rounder; Blue Lily (EMI); Brycemoor
- Website: alanalevandoski.com

Alana Levandoski is a songwriter from Riding Mountain National Park in Manitoba, Canada. She was born in Kelwood, Manitoba.

Cover versions of her songs have been performed or recorded by artists such as Heather Bishop, Jay Semko, Linda Rocheleau, Katy Bowser and Kenny Hutson (Nashville). She has co-written with Gary Nichols, Jim Photoglo, Sylvia Tyson, James LeBanc, Mark Simos, and Colin Cripps, and has worked as a songwriter in Nashville, Tennessee and Muscle Shoals, Alabama.

Levandoski's debut album, Unsettled Down, was released on Rounder Records in July 2005. She recorded her second album, Lions and Werewolves, with Liverpool producer and triple Grammy winner Ken Nelson who produced the first three Coldplay records. Nelson flew to Manitoba initially to work on the project, and Levandoski completed the album at Parr St Studios in Liverpool, at times using the same piano Chris Martin played on some of Coldplay's recordings.

Levandoski has toured Canada, Europe, the US and the United Kingdom with such acts as Carlene Carter, Bruce Cockburn, Blue Rodeo, Kevin Welch, Dar Williams, Tanya Tucker, Corb Lund, and Lynn Miles.

Levandoski has had albums released on Rounder Records and Blue Lily Records (EMI) and her early works are published by Brycemoor Music out of Toronto.

Levandoski did a music pilgrimage for 6 months from Newfoundland to New Orleans in early 2011.

Now married and a mother of two, and step mother of one, the singer/songwriter lives on an acreage near Onanole, Manitoba.

Alana attended the inaugural class of the Living School for Action and Contemplation in New Mexico.

Her latest albums are Behold, I Make all Things New, which Image Journal described as "a circle to enjoy without ceasing", Sanctuary - Exploring the Healing Path with James Finley, Imago Dei (an EP) and Point Vierge - the Journey of Thomas Merton in Song (April 2018)
