= Haywood, Manitoba =

Haywood
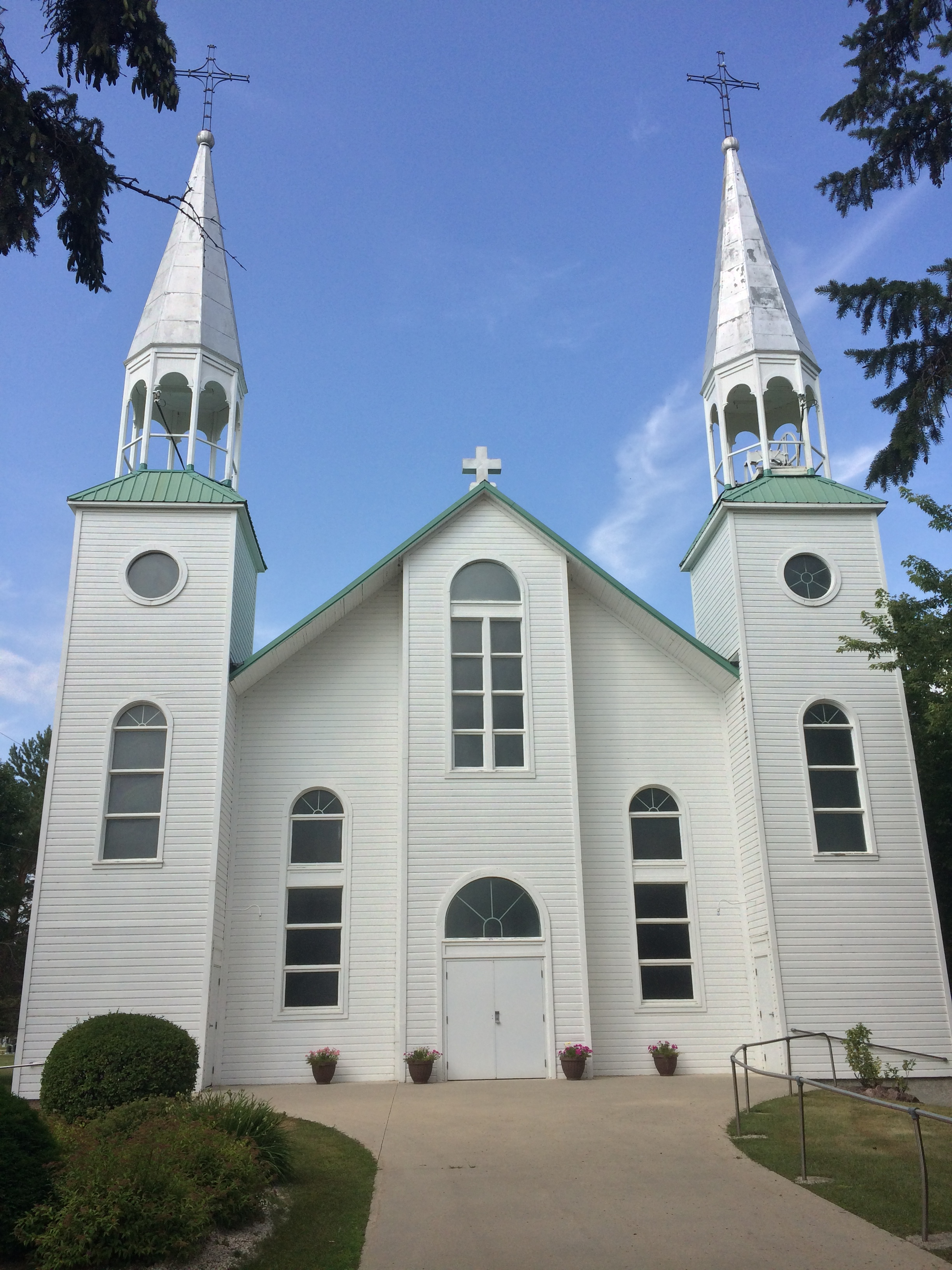
- Saint-Denis Roman Catholic Church in Haywood

- Location of Haywood in Manitoba
- Coordinates: 49°40′0″N 98°11′47″W
- Country: Canada
- Province: Manitoba
- Region: Central Plains
- Census Division: No. 9

Government
  - Governing Body: Rural Municipality of Grey Council
  - MP: Branden Leslie
  - MLA: Lauren Stone
- Time zone: UTC−6 (CST)
  - Summer (DST): UTC−5 (CDT)
- Postal Code: R0G 0W0
- Area codes: 204, 431
- NTS Map: 062G09
- GNBC Code: GAKOF

Haywood is an unincorporated community recognized as a local urban district in the province of Manitoba, Canada. Haywood is situated in the Rural Municipality of Grey, east of St. Claude and west of Elm Creek.

The community includes a church, a hall, a cemetery, and many other public areas and services that most communities provide. Haywood, however, does not have a school, and therefore, students ride the bus to St. Claude, a neighbouring community to the west.

Haywood was founded in 1907. The centennial anniversary was acknowledged in 2007. The event was celebrated by featuring a float parade, sponsored by a number Haywood and St. Claude businesses and families. A supper was later held in the community hall, followed by a show of fireworks, at around 11:00 PM that night.
