= Culross, Manitoba =

Culross
- Location of Culross in Manitoba
- Coordinates: 49°42′51″N 97°54′40″W
- Country: Canada
- Province: Manitoba
- Region: Pembina Valley
- Census Division: No. 9

Government
  - Governing Body: Rural Municipality of Grey Council
  - MP: Branden Leslie
  - MLA: Lauren Stone
- Time zone: UTC−6 (CST)
  - Summer (DST): UTC−5 (CDT)
- Area code: 204
- NTS Map: 062H12
- GNBC Code: GAFYV

Culross is an unincorporated community in south central Manitoba, Canada. It is located approximately 58 kilometers (36 miles) west of Winnipeg on Manitoba Highway 2 in the Rural Municipality of Grey.

The community was named for Culross, Fife, Scotland.
