= Rural Municipality of Lansdowne =

Rural municipality in Manitoba, Canada

Coordinates: 50°17′04″N 99°15′20″W

The Rural Municipality of Lansdowne is a former rural municipality (RM) in the Canadian province of Manitoba. It was originally incorporated as a rural municipality on December 22, 1883. In 1891, the Lansdowne subdistrict had a population of 1037. It ceased on January 1, 2015 as a result of its provincially mandated amalgamation with the RM of Glenella to form the Municipality of Glenella – Lansdowne.

The former RM is located west of Lake Manitoba and northeast of the Town of Neepawa.

== Communities ==
- Arden
- Keyes
- Tenby

== Tourism ==
=== Landmarks ===
==== Cemeteries ====
- Arden Cemetery, Arden.

==== Monuments ====
- Arden Crocus Monument, Arden.
- Arden School No. 341, Arden
- Glacial Lake Agassiz Plaque, Arden

== Places of interest ==
- Arden Camp Site, Arden.
