= Deleau, Manitoba =

Coordinates: 49.583°N 100.575°W

Deleau is a locality within the Rural Municipality of Sifton in southwestern Manitoba, Canada. It is located along Manitoba Highway 2 and the Red Coat Trail approximately 21 kilometres (13 miles) northwest of Hartney.
