= Fannystelle =

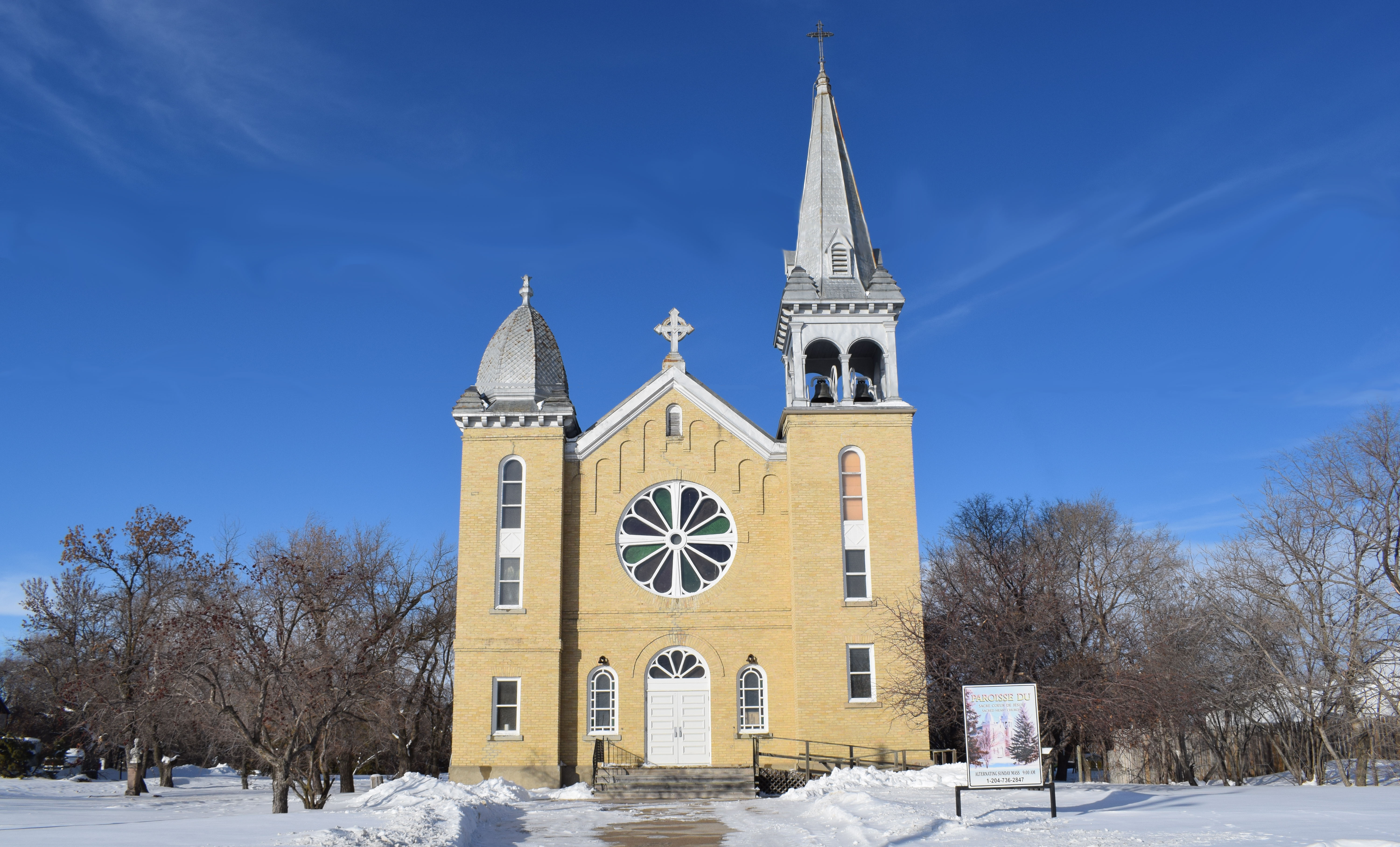
- Sacred Heart Of Jesus Roman Catholic Church, Fannystelle, Manitoba

- Location of Fannystelle in Manitoba
- Coordinates: 49°44′41″N 97°46′40″W
- Country: Canada
- Province: Manitoba
- Region: Central Plains Region
- Census Division: No. 9

Government
  - Governing Body: Rural Municipality of Grey Council
  - MP: Branden Leslie
  - MLA: Lauren Stone
- Time zone: UTC−6 (CST)
  - Summer (DST): UTC−5 (CDT)
- Postal Code: R0G 0P0
- Area codes: 204, 431
- NTS Map: 062H12
- GNBC Code: GAHZY

Fannystelle is an unincorporated settlement in southcentral Manitoba, Canada. It is situated on Provincial Trunk Highway 2 approximately 48 kilometers (30 miles) west of Winnipeg in the Rural Municipality of Grey.
