= Polonia, Manitoba =

Polonia
- Location within Manitoba
- Coordinates: 50°23′19″N 99°37′17″W
- Country: Canada
- Province: Manitoba
- Established: 1885

Government
  - Body: RM of Rosedale Council
  - Reeve of RM of Rosedale: Michael Porrok
  - MLA (Agassiz): Jodie Byram
  - MP (Dauphin—Swan River—Neepawa): Dan Mazier
- Elevation: 621 m (2,037 ft)
- Time zone: UTC-6 (CST)
  - Summer (DST): UTC-5 (CDT)
- Postal Code: R0J 1R0
- Area code: 204

Polonia is an unincorporated community in the Rural Municipality of Rosedale in Manitoba, Canada. It is located 82 kilometres (51 miles) north-east of Brandon, Manitoba.

== Etymology ==
Initially, named Hungarian Valley, the name was later shortened to Hun's Valley. The name came from the original settlers, many of whom were of Hungarian origin, who were reminded of their homeland. In 1921, in response to the influx of Poles, the name was changed to Polonia, the Latin form of Poland. The valley which runs through the area was formally named Huns Valley in 1977.

== History ==
The settlement was established in 1885 by 38 families led by Count Géza S. de Döry, a Hungarian nobleman and agricultural expert, under the auspices of Count Paul Esterházy. These 38 families were recruited from the eastern mining region of Pennsylvania and were of Hungarian, Slovak and Czech extraction. More than half of the original families did not homestead in the area and instead left to seek work elsewhere. Those who did remain were joined by a second smaller group that arrived from Pennsylvania that year. By the end of 1885, 17 colonists representing 43 individuals had filed homestead entries and began to work the land. In 1886, a post office was opened. In 1887, the first school was built, later being replaced in 1911 and again in 1934 after the previous building was destroyed by fire. In 1887-88, a small Roman Catholic church was built, later replaced by the current St. Elizabeth of Hungary church in 1902. By 1893, 122 people from 29 families resided in the colony. After 1895 with the death of de Döry, most of the original colonists would leave, being replaced by Polish settlers.
