= Rural Municipality of Rosedale =

Rural municipality in Manitoba, Canada

- Rural municipality
- Location of the RM of Rosedale in Manitoba
- Coordinates: 50°26′23″N 99°32′20″W
- Country: Canada
- Province: Manitoba
- Region: Westman

Area
  - Land: 864.55 km^{2} (333.80 sq mi)

Population (2021)
  - Total: 1,524
- Time zone: UTC-6 (CST)
  - Summer (DST): UTC-5 (CDT)
- Area codes: 204 and 431
- Website: rmrosedale.com

Rosedale is a rural municipality (RM) in the province of Manitoba in Western Canada. The southeast corner of Riding Mountain National Park overlaps the northwest corner of the RM, and comprises about one-sixth of Rosedale's territory. The Town of Neepawa borders the municipality.

== Communities ==
- Birnie
- Eden
- Franklin
- Kelwood
- Mountain Road
- Polonia
- Riding Mountain

== Demographics ==
In the 2021 Census of Population conducted by Statistics Canada, Rosedale had a population of 1,524 living in 507 of its 587 total private dwellings, a change of −8.9% from its 2016 population of 1,672. With a land area of 864.68 km^{2} (333.85 sq mi), it had a population density of 1.8/km^{2} (4.6/sq mi) in 2021.

== Tourism ==
Mountain Road Hall hosts a spring and fall craft sale

=== Churches ===
- Living Hope Fellowship Church – Eden
- Mountainview Church of God – Eden
- Kingdom Hall of Jehovah Witness – Kelwood
- St. John's Anglican Church – Kelwood
- St. Elizabeth's Roman Catholic Church – Polonia
- St. Mary's Ukrainian Catholic Church – Mountain Road (Ukrainian: Церква)

=== Monuments ===
- Big Valley School No. 2109
- Birnie Memorial Park
- Birnie Methodist Church
- Clarkesville School No. 1396
- Coldstream School No. 435
- Eden Consolidated School No. 1661
- Franklin School No. 780
- Iroquois School No. 303
- Kelwood Centennial Monument
- Kelwood War Memorial
- Kenilworth School / Riding Mountain School No. 1439
- Knox United Church
- Mountain Road School No. 1432
- Mountain Road Stores
- Mountain View School No. 244
- Patronage of the Blessed Virgin Mary Ukrainian Catholic Church
- Polonia School No. 732
- Riding Mountain War Memorial
- Roskeen School No. 1058
- Springhill Church
- Springhill School No. 374
- Tobarmore School No. 616
