= Division No. 9, Manitoba =

Census division in Canada

Coordinates: 49°55′00″N 98°08′50″W

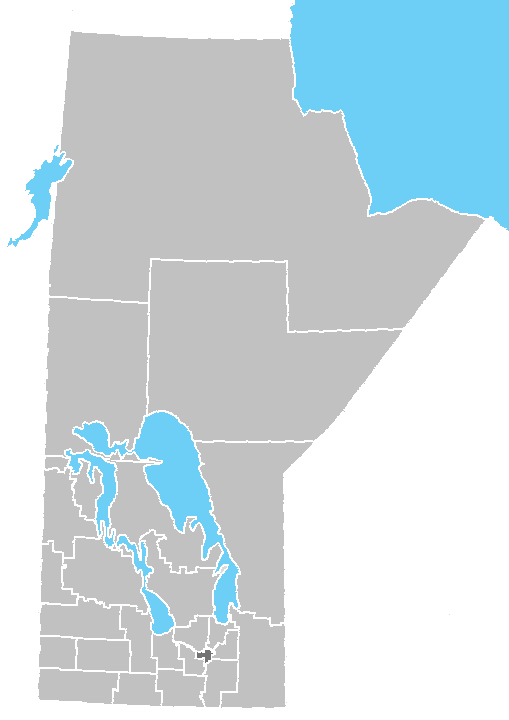

Census Division No. 9 (Portage la Prairie) is a census division located within the Central Plains Region of the province of Manitoba, Canada. Unlike in some other provinces, census divisions do not reflect the organization of local government in Manitoba. These areas exist solely for the purposes of statistical analysis and presentation; they have no government of their own.

The major service centre of the area is the City of Portage la Prairie. The economic base of the area is agriculture, food processing and manufacturing. The population of the area as of the 2016 census was 24,391. Also included in the division are the Dakota Plains First Nation and the largest portion of the Long Plain First Nation.

== Demographics ==
In the 2021 Census of Population conducted by Statistics Canada, Division No. 9 had a population of 24,339 living in 9,260 of its 10,119 total private dwellings, a change of −0.2% from its 2016 population of 24,391. With a land area of 3,009.17 km^{2} (1,161.85 sq mi), it had a population density of 8.1/km^{2} (20.9/sq mi) in 2021.

== Cities ==
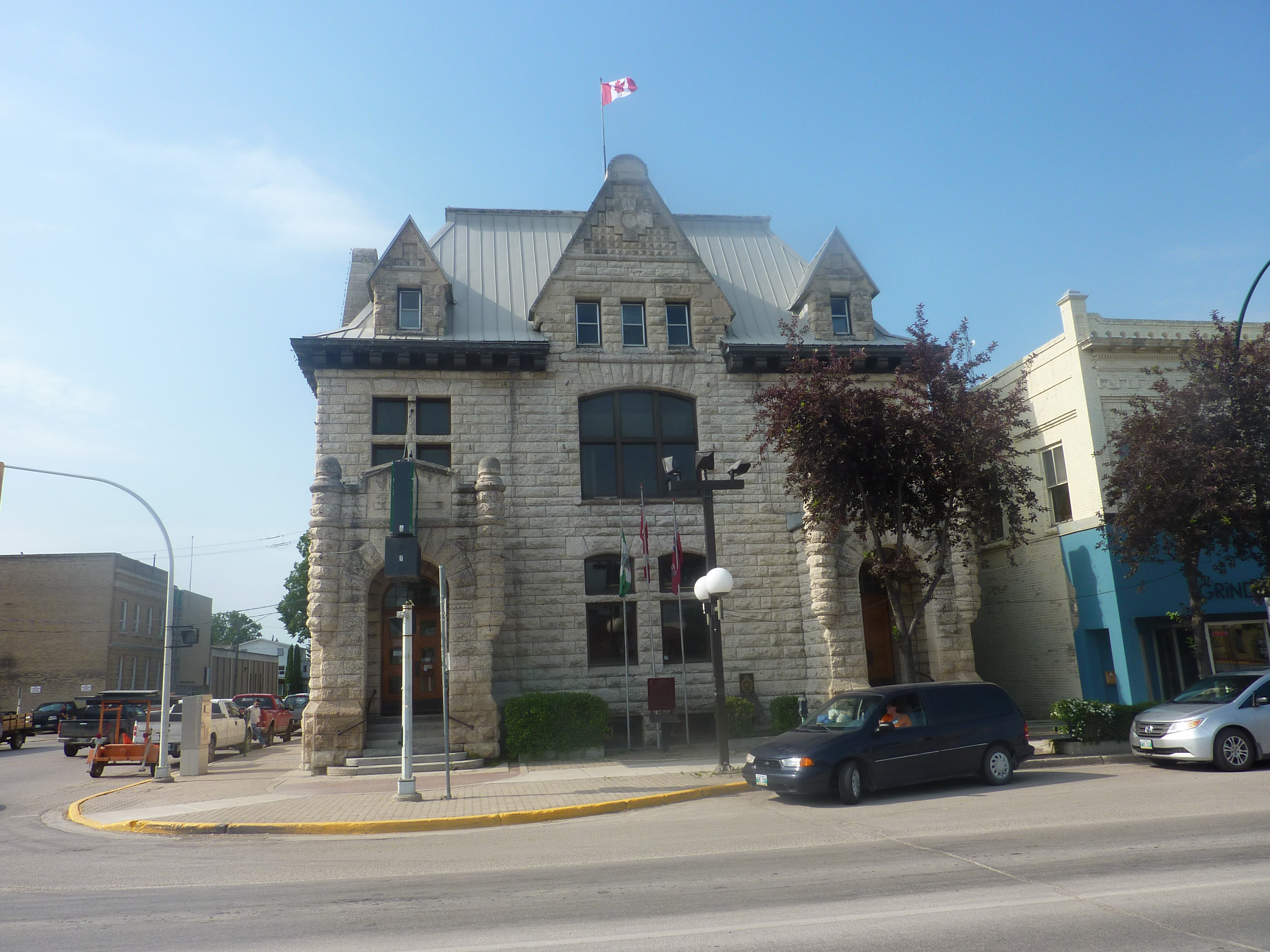
Public building in Portage la Prairie

- Portage la Prairie

== Unincorporated communities ==
- Village of St. Claude

== Rural municipalities ==
- Grey
- Portage la Prairie

== First Nations and reserves ==
- Dakota Plains First Nation (Dakota Plains 6A, Dakota Tipi 1)
- Long Plain First Nation (Long Plain 6, part)
