= Kelwood, Manitoba =

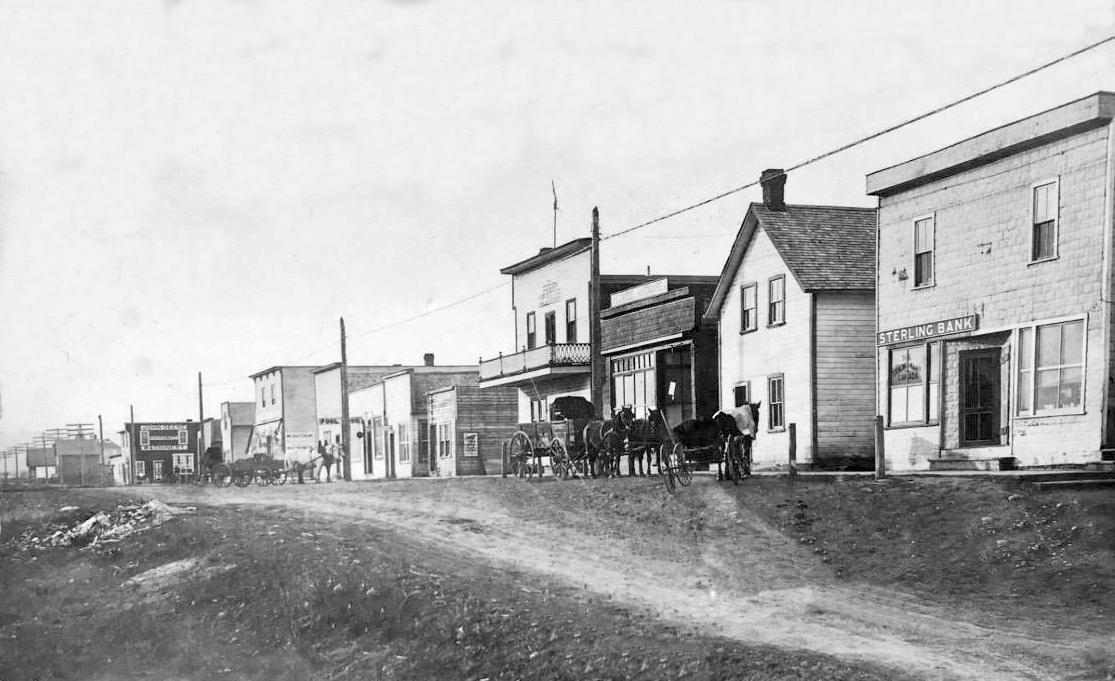
Kelwood, 1914

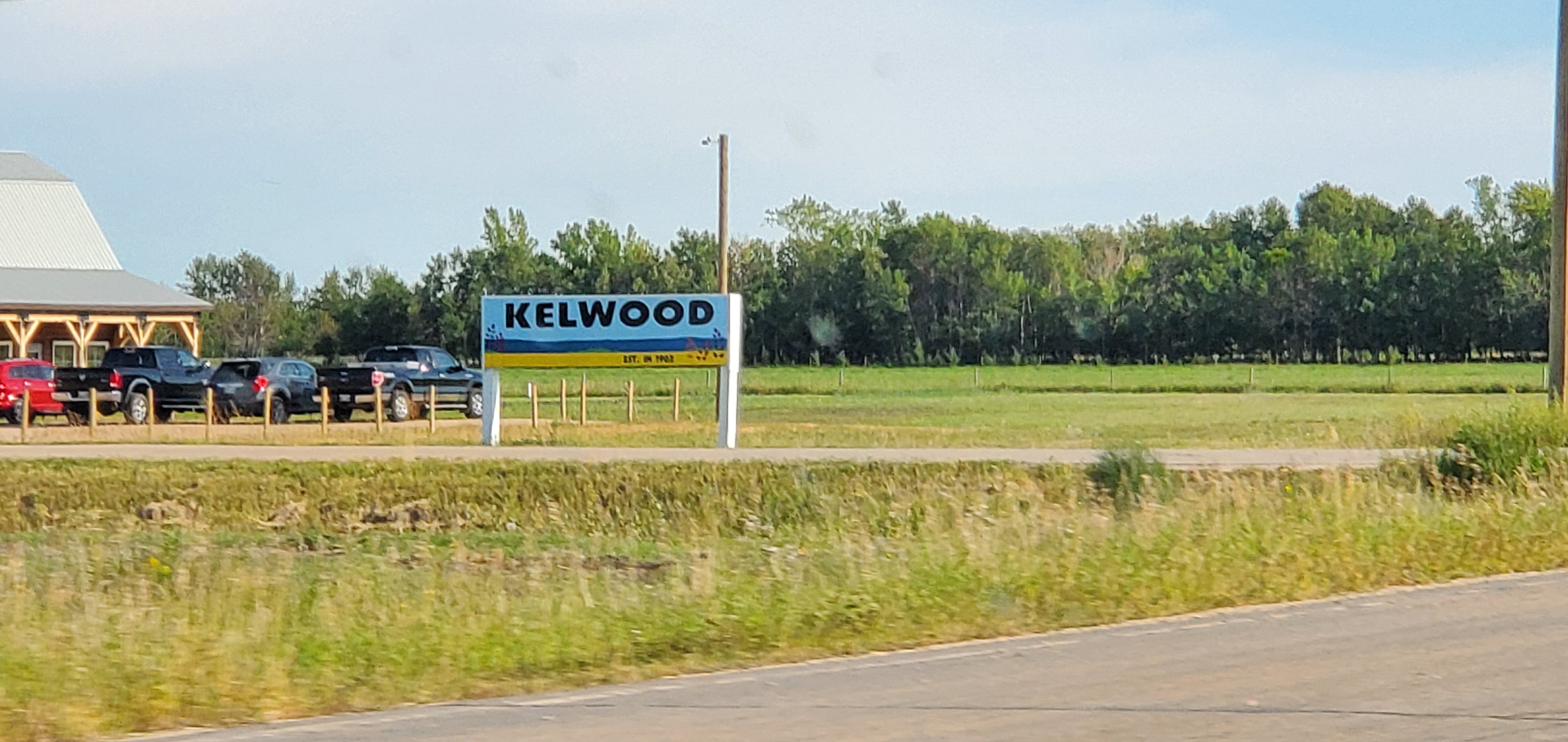
Kelwood, 2020

Kelwood is a community in the Rural Municipality of Rosedale, Manitoba, Canada.

It has a gas station/restaurant right on the highway called the Barn, there’s an antique store, and a cafe downtown. There is also the Kelwood legion for the after work crowd. It is north of Neepawa and is home to the Harvest Sun Music Fest.
