= Municipality of Norfolk Treherne =

Rural municipality in Manitoba, Canada

Norfolk Treherne
- Rural municipality
- Municipality of Norfolk Treherne
- Location of the Municipality of Norfolk Trehern in Manitoba
- Coordinates: 49°39′55″N 98°35′48″W
- Country: Canada
- Province: Manitoba
- Region: Central Plains
- Incorporated (amalgamated): January 1, 2015
- Time zone: UTC-6 (CST)
  - Summer (DST): UTC-5 (CDT)
- Website: norfolktreherne.ca

The Municipality of Norfolk Treherne is a rural municipality (RM) in the Canadian province of Manitoba.

== History ==
It was incorporated on January 1, 2015, via the amalgamation of the RM of South Norfolk and the Town of Treherne. It was formed as a requirement of The Municipal Amalgamations Act, which required that municipalities with a population less than 1,000 amalgamate with one or more neighbouring municipalities by 2015. The Government of Manitoba initiated these amalgamations in order for municipalities to meet the 1997 minimum population requirement of 1,000 to incorporate a municipality.

== Communities ==
- Rathwell
- Treherne

== Demographics ==
In the 2021 Census of Population conducted by Statistics Canada, Norfolk-Treherne had a population of 1,770 living in 645 of its 685 total private dwellings, a change of 1.1% from its 2016 population of 1,751. With a land area of 737.9 km^{2} (284.9 sq mi), it had a population density of 2.4/km^{2} (6.2/sq mi) in 2021.

== See also ==
- List of francophone communities in Manitoba
