= Rural Municipality of Grey =

Rural municipality in Manitoba, Canada

Grey
- Rural municipality
- Rural Municipality of Grey
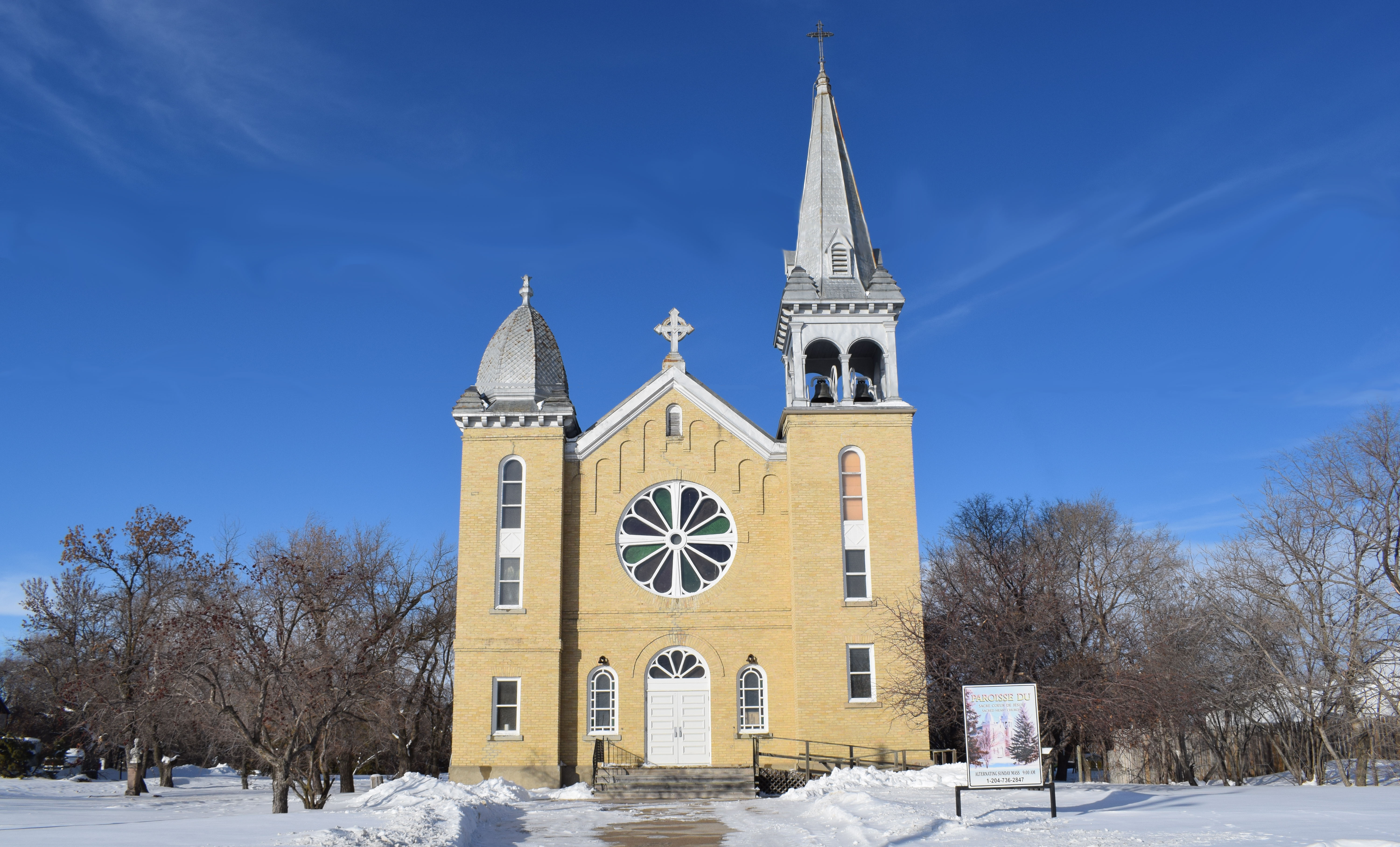
- Sacred Heart Of Jesus Roman Catholic Church in Fannystelle, Manitoba.

- Location of the RM of Grey in Manitoba
- Coordinates: 49°42′34″N 98°04′25″W
- Country: Canada
- Province: Manitoba
- Region: Central Plains
- Incorporated: February 9, 1906
- Amalgamated: January 1, 2015
- Time zone: UTC-6 (CST)
  - Summer (DST): UTC-5 (CDT)
- Website: www.rmofgrey.ca

The Rural Municipality of Grey (French: Municipalité rurale de Grey) is a rural municipality in the Canadian province of Manitoba. It is named after Albert Grey, 4th Earl Grey, the former Governor General of Canada.

== History ==
The RM was incorporated on February 9, 1906. It amalgamated with the Village of St. Claude on January 1, 2015, as a requirement of The Municipal Amalgamations Act for municipalities with a population less than 1,000 residents. The Government of Manitoba initiated these amalgamations in order for municipalities to meet the 1997 minimum population requirement of 1,000 to incorporate a municipality.

== Communities ==
- Culross
- Elm Creek
- Fannystelle
- Haywood
- St. Claude

== Demographics ==
In the 2021 Census of Population conducted by Statistics Canada, Grey had a population of 2,517 living in 959 of its 1,034 total private dwellings, a change of −4.9% from its 2016 population of 2,648. With a land area of 968.9 km^{2} (374.1 sq mi), it had a population density of 2.6/km^{2} (6.7/sq mi) in 2021.

== See also ==
- List of francophone communities in Manitoba
