= Treherne, Manitoba =

Town in Manitoba, Canada

Coordinates: 49°37′46″N 98°41′52″W

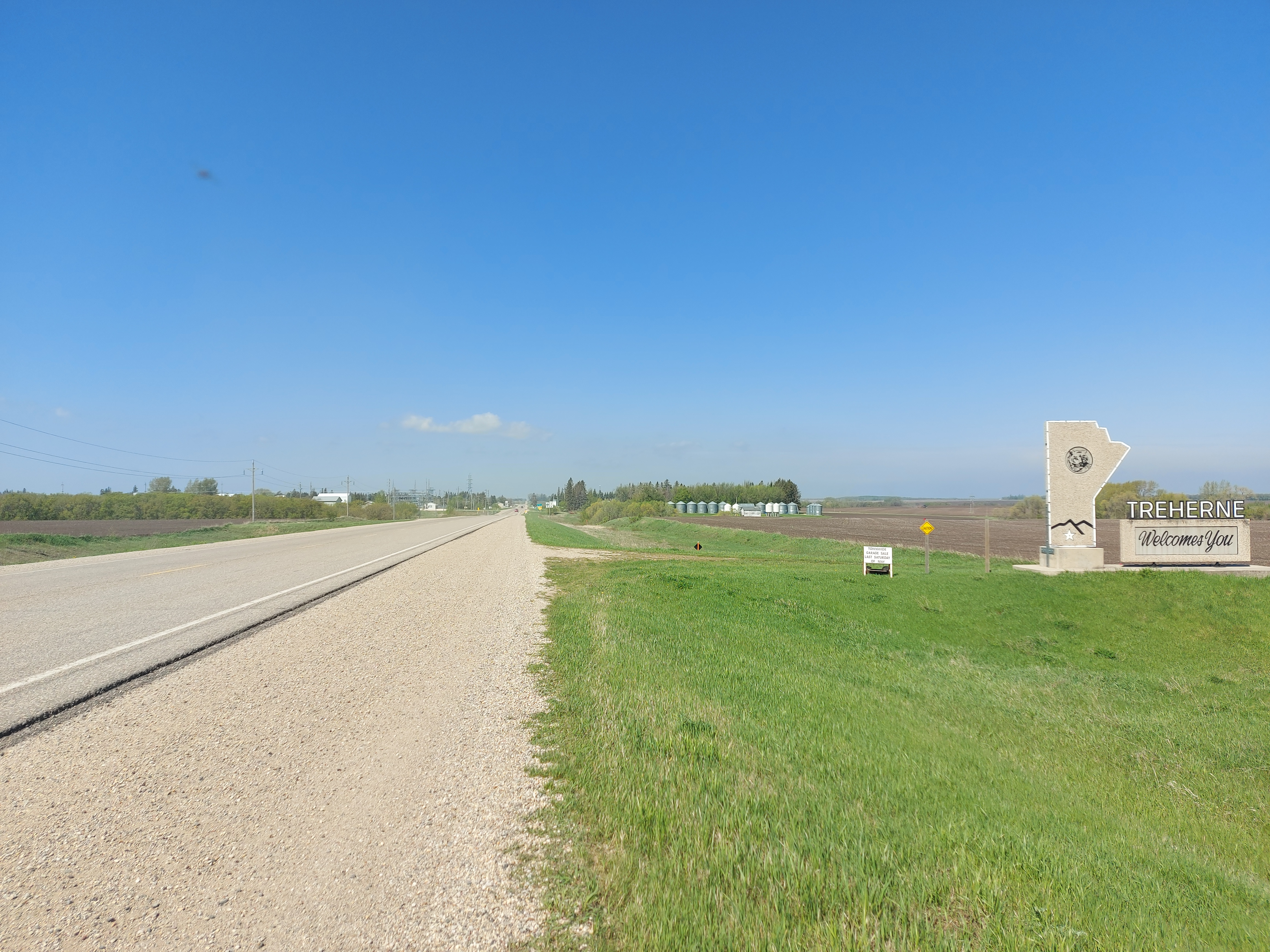
Treherne welcome sign on Highway 2

Treherne is an unincorporated urban community in the Municipality of Norfolk Treherne within the Canadian province of Manitoba that held town status prior to January 1, 2015. It is halfway between Winnipeg and Brandon on Provincial Highway 2. Primarily a farming community, Treherne has a significant portion of the municipality's population, which is around 650 people, and has two schools (Treherne Elementary School and Treherne Collegiate Institute) and a hospital. There is also a daycare facility, and in 2006 Treherne opened the Treherne Aquatic Centre next to a campground facility.

Treherne is named for George Treherne, an early settler.

Treherne hosts the annual "Run for the Hills" marathon each fall with the course winding through the Tiger Hills. A popular tourist attraction in Treherne consists of a glass bottle house, chapel, wishing well, and fully functional washroom with plumbing and running water. Treherne has a museum, which exhibits an extensive antique gun collection and a mini indoor village.

== Demographics ==
In the 2021 Census of Population conducted by Statistics Canada, Treherne had a population of 650 living in 287 of its 306 total private dwellings, a change of 5.7% from its 2016 population of 615. With a land area of 2.04 km^{2} (0.79 sq mi), it had a population density of 318.6/km^{2} (825.2/sq mi) in 2021.

== Gallery ==
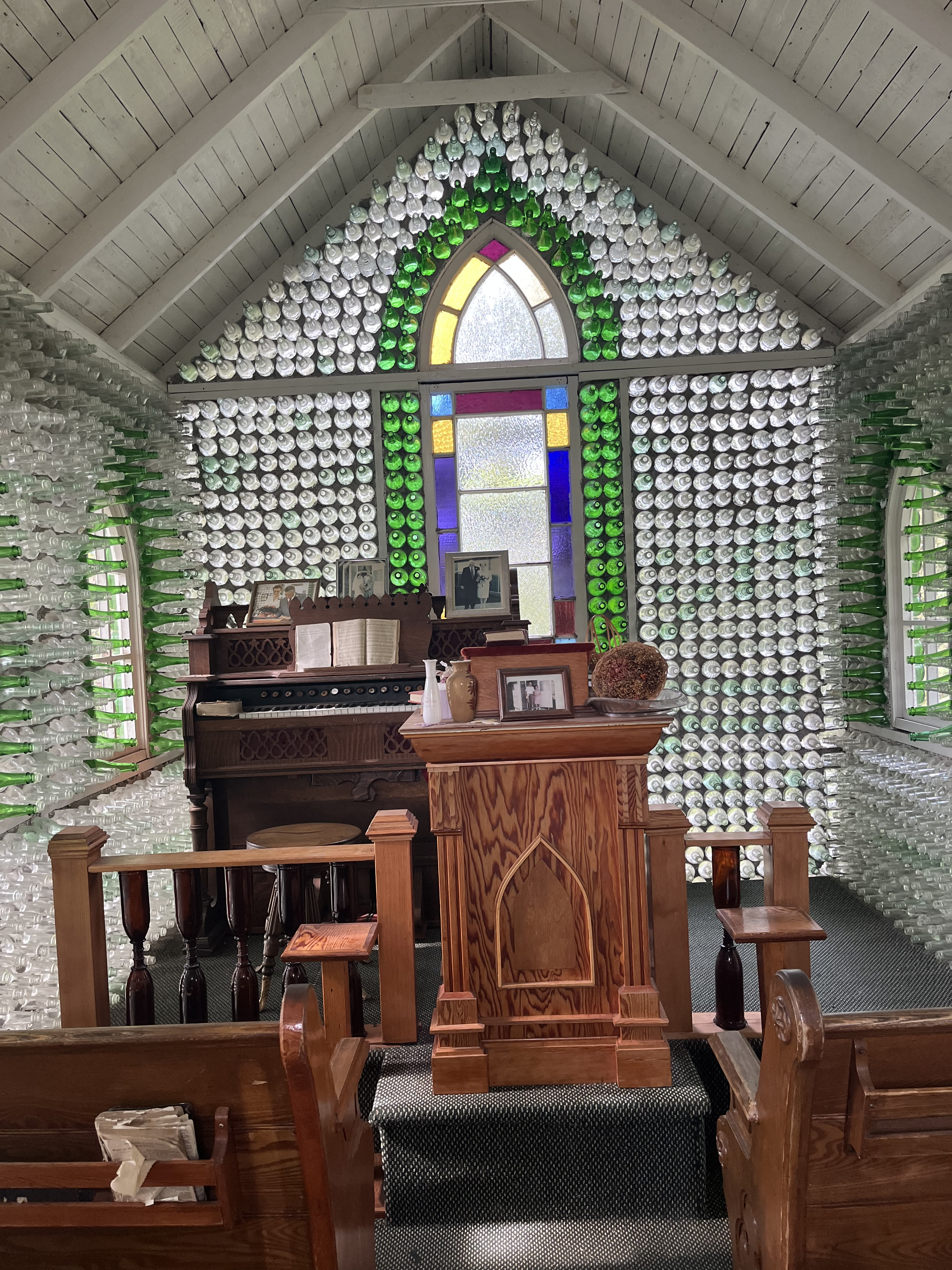
Small chapel with walls made of glass bottles

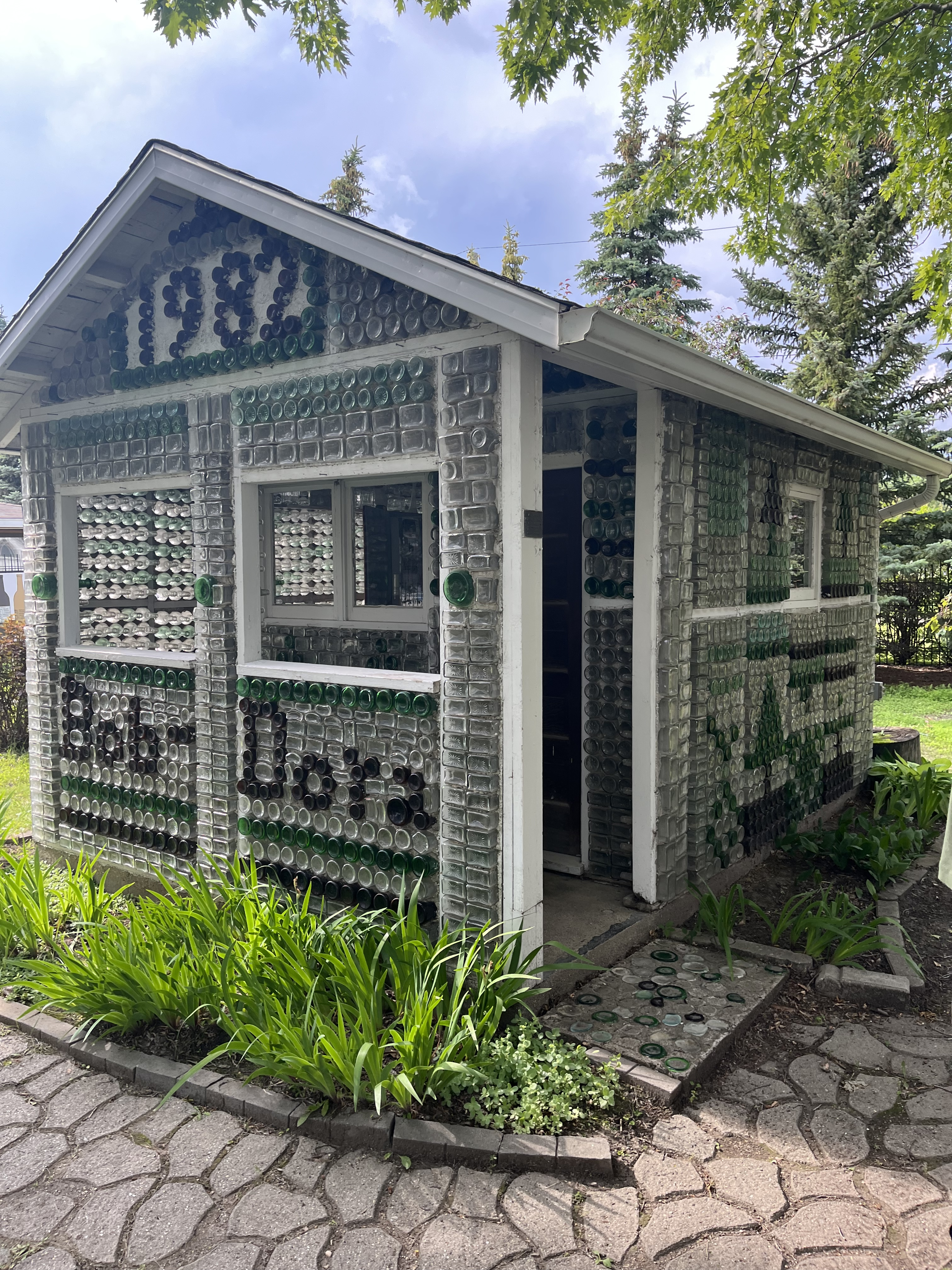
Small house with walls made of glass bottles

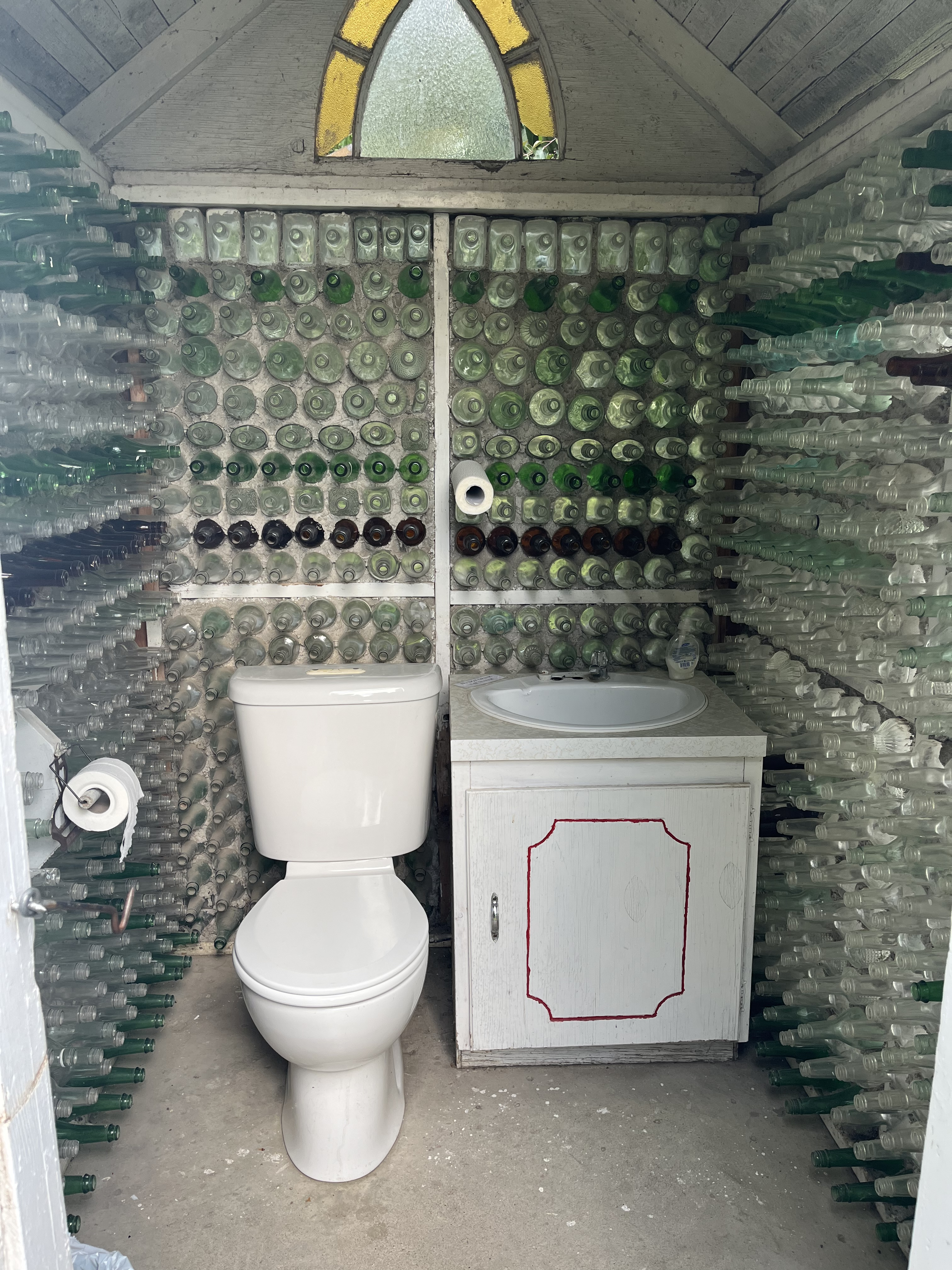
Functional washroom with walls made of glass bottles

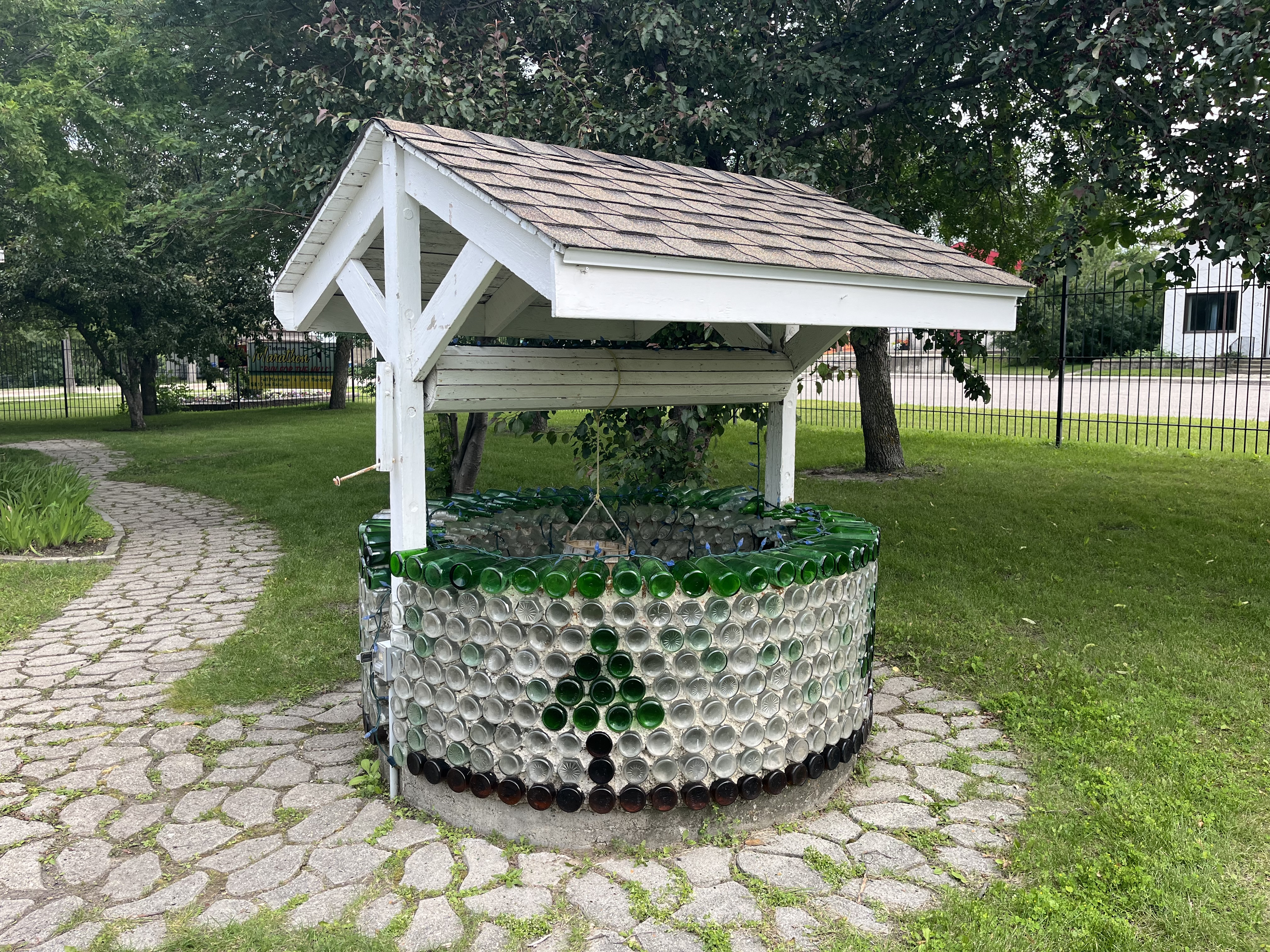
Non-functional water well made of glass bottles

== See also ==
- List of communities in Manitoba
