= St. Claude, Manitoba =

St. Claude
- Location of St. Claude in Manitoba
- Coordinates: 49°39′26″N 98°20′47″W
- Country: Canada
- Province: Manitoba
- Region: Central Plains
- Census Division: No. 9

Government
  - Governing Body: Rural Municipality of Grey Council
  - MP: Branden Leslie
  - MLA: Lauren Stone

Area
  - Total: 1.81 km^{2} (0.70 sq mi)

Population (2016)
  - Total: 603
- Time zone: UTC−6 (CST)
  - Summer (DST): UTC−5 (CDT)
- Postal Code: R0G 1Z0
- Area codes: 204, 431

St. Claude is an unincorporated community recognized as a local urban district in the Rural Municipality of Grey within the Canadian province of Manitoba that held village status prior to January 1, 2015.

== Demographics ==
In the 2021 Census of Population conducted by Statistics Canada, St. Claude had a population of 625 living in 262 of its 277 total private dwellings, a change of 3.6% from its 2016 population of 603. With a land area of 1.84 km^{2} (0.71 sq mi), it had a population density of 339.7/km^{2} (879.8/sq mi) in 2021.

== Location and features ==
It is located to the west of Winnipeg and is home to the world's largest smoking pipe (19 ft by 5 ft), which was smoked by locals during a fair in 1986. It is named the dairy capital of Manitoba as it is home to one of Manitoba's largest dairy processing plants and also displays a dairy museum filled with many artifacts. One of the other museums holds a two-headed calf, which was born over 120 years ago. It had a population of 590 in 2014.

St. Claude also has a bilingual library, two grocery stores, a curling rink, a skating rink (which hosts public skating every Friday during the winter), a Chinese food restaurant, two gas stations and a clinic. Despite being a small community, St. Claude has many activities such as the annual Winter Carnival, the annual Summer Rodeo and the community-wide yard sales which occurs the first Saturday in May.

The community is also a host to the Saint-Claude Gaol Museum (c. 1912), which was designated a municipal heritage site in 2005. At the gaol, local people have their photo taken and put in the local newspaper, The Gazette. It is featured in the 2006 film "One Week" starring Joshua Jackson.

There are two running schools, École communautaire Gilbert-Rosset is the community's French-speaking school. Complexe Scolaire St. Claude School Complex is the community's bilingual school. It educates the greater portion of students in St. Claude.

== Name ==
St. Claude was named for Saint-Claude, Jura in France.
