= Plumas, Manitoba =

Plumas
- Local urban district
- Motto: "Proud to be Prairie"
- Location of Plumas in Manitoba
- Coordinates: 50°23′N 99°05′W
- Country: Canada
- Province: Manitoba
- Region: Central Plains Region
- Division: Division No. 8, Manitoba
- Rural Municipality: Municipality of WestLake – Gladstone
- Established: 1872

Area
  - Local urban district: 0.74 km^{2} (0.29 sq mi)
- Elevation: 281 m (922 ft)

Population (2011)
  - Local urban district: 227
  - Density: 310/km^{2} (790/sq mi)
  - Urban: 278
  - Urban density: 375.7/km^{2} (973/sq mi)
- Demonym(s): Plumasite, Pin-Head
- Time zone: UTC−6 (CST)
  - Summer (DST): UTC−5 (CDT)
- Postal code: R0J 1P0
- Area code: 204
- Highways: 260; 265
- Waterways: Jordan Creek

Plumas is an unincorporated community recognized as a local urban district located in the Municipality of WestLake – Gladstone, in the Canadian province of Manitoba. Plumas is roughly 70 km northwest of Portage la Prairie, Manitoba, and about 150 km northwest of the provincial capital, Winnipeg.

== Geography ==
In perspective, the elevation of Plumas is lower than Neepawa, but quite a bit higher than Portage la Prairie or Winnipeg. Despite the community's proximity to the Arden Ridge (a higher rise in the landscape located about 15 km west of Plumas, consisting of a series of hills and valleys, where the elevation rises 50 metres), Plumas is quite flat. Riding Mountain National Park is located about 35 km northwest of Plumas, where the land rises significantly to an elevation of almost 700 metres. Just 30 km east of Plumas lies Lake Manitoba, where the elevation is about 35 metres lower. The Jordan Creek flows through Plumas, and empties into the Big Grass Marsh (east of Plumas), one of North America's largest and well-regarded areas of marshland. The Whitemud River runs south of the village along Provincial Hwy 16. Farmland, meadows, forest, bush, and marsh surround the area. Jackfish Lake, also part of a protected wildlife/waterfowl area, is situated 16 km northeast of Plumas; the lake is a major gathering spot for thousands of migrating sandhill cranes passing through each year.

== Government ==
The community is officially designated as a local urban district (LUD) within the Municipality of Westlake-Gladstone. Daryl Shipman is currently the mayor of this RM. Though not a municipality of its own, Plumas has a committee as the local governing body that more or less plans community events and development, regards local issues within the community itself, and forms general decisions and recommendations that are intended to help resolve these issues. The committee consists of the chair, who is the councillor of Ward 4 of the RM (The LUD of Plumas is located within this ward), and three other committee members, elected by the community. Approximately 40% of the population voted in the October 2022 elections. The designated boundaries of the LUD do not include the houses on the north side of Queens Road, which are located in another ward, but are still counted as part of Plumas' urban population.

== History ==
Plumas' history dates back to about 1872, when English settlers came to the area to farm. The land was fertile enough for growing crops, although not the best, yet affordable. In 1873, the community was originally named Jordan, named after the Jordan River located in Israel (Plumas also has a creek running through it still named the "Jordan Creek" today). Jordan School, one of the earliest schools in the district, was located in the northeast corner of the community, built sometime around 1873. Later on, as many as nine one-room schools existed within the Plumas School District. In 1879, the first post office was constructed. Jordan's name was later changed to Richmond in 1882. Again, sometime later, the community's name was changed to Plumas, after a man who had been in contact with Plumas County, California, came to settle here (The name "Plumas" is derived from the Spanish word "pluma," meaning "feather."). More immigrants, mainly of English, Irish, or Scottish descent, came to settle in the late 1800s and early 1900s, when they discovered that the land was fertile and cheap. In 1896, following the arrival of the Canadian National Railway (CNR), the already striving community began to really "take-off"; after a ten-year delay in the construction of this particular railway branch. The railway was quite important, as it transported freight, supplies, and passengers to and from Plumas.

Throughout the years after 1900, the community's population was on a steady climb, when agriculture was a very prosperous industry. Where there were people, there was business. Plumas was a hub for the Westbourne Agricultural Region, offering many services and facilities to its surrounding residents. In 1925, when the Presbyterian, Methodist and Congregational Churches amalgamated to form the United Church of Canada, the Methodist and Presbyterian Churches in Plumas were physically joined together to form the community's own United Church; with one building being used for Sunday School and Fellowship, and the other a church sanctuary. During the Great Depression and World War II, Plumas wasn't hit as hard as some places, but farmers were very busy managing crops during those economically tough times. In 1951, Plumas' main street was paved. Around that time, the community also got electricity; however, in the 1940s Plumas had a generator which provided electricity to the community itself. Ukrainian and German populations increased in and around Plumas during the 1940s and 1950s. By the mid-20th century, Plumas had three hardware stores, three grain elevators, a clothing store, bowling alley and community hall, a local newspaper, four churches, two grocery stores, one grand hotel, two restaurants, a movie theatre, farm equipment and supplies outfits, a high school, and an elementary school. By this time, Plumas' population peaked at about 400 residents. After 1960, however, the striving community was near the end of its peak, as the agricultural industry continued changing so that farms became bigger and farther between, and modern technology allowing less employees to farm the same area.

== Demographics ==
In the 2021 Census of Population conducted by Statistics Canada, Plumas had a population of 235 living in 115 of its 126 total private dwellings, a change of −3.3% from its 2016 population of 243. With a land area of 0.96 km^{2} (0.37 sq mi), it had a population density of 244.8/km^{2} (634.0/sq mi) in 2021.

== Economy ==
Agriculture still plays a role in keeping the community's economy strong, including trucking and transportation, and farming, although the three grain elevators that once stood, as well as the train station, are now gone. The main crops grown in the area are wheat and canola. The primary type of livestock raised in the area is beef cattle. Soybeans, field peas, sunflowers, and feed crops (including oats and barley) are also farmed in the area. About 30 km southwest of Plumas, Neepawa is home to a large hog operation, currently employing over 1,000 people. Renegade Transport is currently based in Plumas, providing semi-trailer transportation of crops and fertilizer to communities across the province. Small retail outfits also play a role in the community's economy. Today, the community is experiencing a steady, but increasing population. The future expansion of the hog operation in Neepawa could possibly triple the employment at the plant, having a positive effect on the growth of the local area, including the community of Plumas. Many residents living in Plumas work in other larger urban centres including Gladstone, Neepawa and Portage la Prairie, and commute on a regular basis.

== Climate ==
Because Plumas is at a relatively higher elevation than Portage la Prairie or Gladstone, it usually sees frost and below zero temperatures before the rest of Southern Manitoba, in early to mid-autumn. Noting the proximity of Plumas to Lake Manitoba, intense weather systems are more likely to develop in this region, producing greater amounts of precipitation than in other locales further away from the lake, particularly during storms. Although Plumas is further away from Dauphin than Portage la Prairie, the community experiences more similar weather patterns to that of Dauphin. The Riding Mountains (a high escarpment of hilly terrain) also have an effect on the climate of the area. Here is an Environment Canada Weather Chart displaying climate data in McCreary, 50 km northwest.

Climate data for McCreary
Month	Jan	Feb	Mar	Apr	May	Jun	Jul	Aug	Sep	Oct	Nov	Dec	Year
Record high °C (°F)	13 (55)	16 (61)	24 (75)	34.5 (94.1)	36 (97)	38 (100)	36.7 (98.1)	38.5 (101.3)	37.5 (99.5)	32.5 (90.5)	24.4 (75.9)	14.5 (58.1)	38.5 (101.3)
Mean daily maximum °C (°F)	−10.5 (13.1)	−6.7 (19.9)	−0.1 (31.8)	9.7 (49.5)	17.9 (64.2)	22.5 (72.5)	25 (77)	24.1 (75.4)	17.7 (63.9)	10.7 (51.3)	−0.4 (31.3)	−8.2 (17.2)	8.5 (47.3)
Mean daily minimum °C (°F)	−22 (−8)	−18.2 (−0.8)	−10.9 (12.4)	−2.8 (27.0)	4.5 (40.1)	10.1 (50.2)	13 (55)	11.6 (52.9)	5.9 (42.6)	−0.4 (31.3)	−9.7 (14.5)	−18.9 (−2.0)	−3.2 (26.2)
Record low °C (°F)	−40.6 (−41.1)	−41 (−42)	−34.4 (−29.9)	−27 (−17)	−10.5 (13.1)	−1.1 (30.0)	0.6 (33.1)	1 (34)	−6.5 (20.3)	−19.5 (−3.1)	−35 (−31)	−39.5 (−39.1)	−41 (−42)
Average precipitation mm (inches)	20.8 (0.82)	17.6 (0.69)	29 (1.1)	32.4 (1.28)	58.2 (2.29)	86.3 (3.40)	79.8 (3.14)	69.4 (2.73)	69.3 (2.73)	42.9 (1.69)	23.6 (0.93)	24.2 (0.95)	554.4 (21.83)
Source: Environment Canada

== Attractions ==
Plumas' motto was chosen to be "Proud to be Prairie," which clearly matches the community's character and location. In the centre of the community (at intersection of Anderson Street and Burrows Avenue), stands a tower, which was formerly the town streetlight and fire/tornado siren, and would make a different alert every day at noon as well. Hunting is a popular outdoor activity in autumn around the Plumas area, attracting bird and game hunters from across Canada and the United States. The area is abundant with open landscapes, bush, marsh, and wildlife, mainly to the north and east of the community.

Plumas is also home to the Plumas Memorial Community Gardens located downtown, designated a public site in 2005, and Lions Park, an open green area including a playground and a scenic area along Jordan Creek. The Plumas Fairgrounds located on Jordan Street, are home to the annual Plumas Agricultural Fair held every July, which hosts a display of market/garden items and homestyle crafts in the skating rink, 4-H cattle and horse shows, a midway, children's activities, a Show N' Shine Classic Car Display, catered meals, live entertainment, and a community parade & pancake breakfast to kick off the weekend. The fairgrounds also provide a baseball diamond, and livestock stables. The Plumas Pirates are the local junior baseball team, playing in tournaments across the province. The team practices and hosts home games right at the Plumas fairgrounds. In the spring, Plumas hosts a community-wide garage sale; in the fall, the Plumas Craft Sale and United Church fall supper are held; and in the winter, the citizens of Plumas organize an annual poker derby, where snowmobilers compete to complete a designated circuit before anyone else (collecting cards along the way at different waypoints along the trail), which starts and ends at the Plumas Inn. Cash prizes can be won. There are also old time dances and occasional live concerts or performances held at the Plumas Community Hall. February is the month where a few fun bonspiels take place at the curling rink. Outside the community, there are cairns, or dedication plaques, indicating the former locations of old school houses in the historic "Plumas School District," which can be found down mile roads within a nine-mile radius of the community. "Heritage & Conservation" Driving Tours (created by local historical committees and conservation boards) are also a great way to visit and experience local historical sites and natural landmarks, scattered throughout the RM of Westbourne, Langford, and Lansdowne.

== Services and facilities ==
The community currently has two churches, a skating rink and arena, curling rink, post office, a grocery and convenience store, community hall, senior's centre, senior's apartments, fire hall, service station, an Inn and restaurant, and many other local businesses. The community is home to a very active "Services for Seniors" organization, which provides "Meals On Wheels" services to the seniors of Plumas, as well as other services. A recent program, developed by Plumas residents in May 2012, called "Let No One Be Alone" is designed to help seniors emotionally and physically, by providing them with support services and personal care in a number of ways. Currently, Plumas is up to date on local events through the Plumas website and a monthly "newspaper" calendar of events. There is a local Lions' Club in the community; also the Plumas Branch of the Royal Canadian Legion.

== Education ==
Plumas Elementary School only has a student body of about 50, and houses three full classrooms ranging from grades K-8. Plumas High School was closed in the 1970s. High school students residing in Plumas shuttle to William Morton Collegiate Institute in Gladstone. Both Plumas Elementary School and William Morton Collegiate Institute are administrated as part of Pine Creek School Division.

== Transportation ==
Passenger rail service is provided by Via Rail's Winnipeg–Churchill train at the Plumas railway station, only if previously arranged.

Plumas is also situated at the corner of Provincial Roads 260 & 265. Provincial Highway 16, which runs east and west from Manitoba to British Columbia, lies 18 km south of Plumas.
