= Elm Creek, Manitoba =

Community in Manitoba, Canada

Elm Creek
- Local urban district
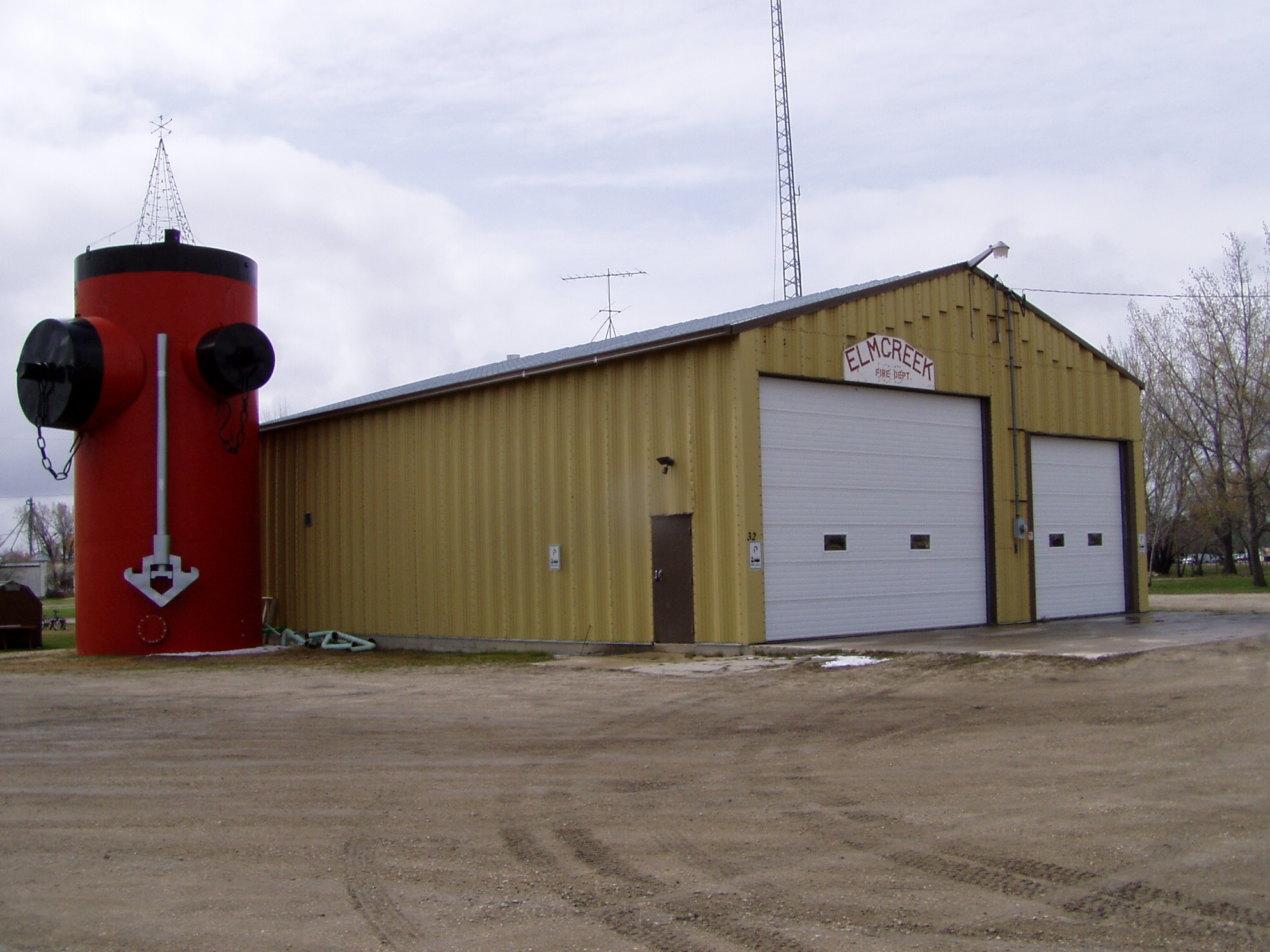
- Elm Creek Fire Department

- Location of Elm Creek in Manitoba
- Coordinates: 49°40′32″N 97°59′33″W
- Country: Canada
- Province: Manitoba
- Region: Pembina Valley
- Rural Municipality: Grey

Government
  - MP: Branden Leslie
  - MLA (Midland): Lauren Stone (PC)

Area
  - Total: 2.69 km^{2} (1.04 sq mi)
- Elevation: 257 m (843 ft)

Population (2016)
  - Total: 339
  - Density: 126.2/km^{2} (327/sq mi)
- Time zone: UTC-6 (CST)
  - Summer (DST): UTC-5 (CDT)

Elm Creek is an unincorporated community recognized as a local urban district in Manitoba, Canada. It is about 50 km west of Winnipeg and about 35 km southeast of Portage la Prairie. It is located in the Rural Municipality of Grey. It is home to the second largest fire hydrant in the world which was unveiled on Canada Day, 2001. The fire hydrant was built out of a tank supplied by a volunteer firefighter and was also built by volunteer firefighters. It is also the home of the second largest H4 chondrite (a class of stony meteorite) ever found in Canada. The 8.2-kg mass was found by a local grader driver on a rural road in 1997.

== Climate ==
According to the Köppen Climate Classification system, Elm Creek has a humid continental climate, abbreviated "Dfb" on climate maps.

Climate data for Elm Creek
Month	Jan	Feb	Mar	Apr	May	Jun	Jul	Aug	Sep	Oct	Nov	Dec	Year
Record high °C (°F)	7.2 (45.0)	10 (50)	17.2 (63.0)	35.5 (95.9)	39.5 (103.1)	38 (100)	36.5 (97.7)	39.5 (103.1)	39 (102)	32 (90)	25 (77)	8 (46)	39.5 (103.1)
Mean daily maximum °C (°F)	−11.5 (11.3)	−8.3 (17.1)	−1 (30)	10.4 (50.7)	19.8 (67.6)	23.4 (74.1)	25.9 (78.6)	25 (77)	18.4 (65.1)	11 (52)	−0.7 (30.7)	−9.9 (14.2)	8.6 (47.5)
Daily mean °C (°F)	−16.5 (2.3)	−13.2 (8.2)	−5.8 (21.6)	4.2 (39.6)	12.5 (54.5)	16.9 (62.4)	19.4 (66.9)	18.2 (64.8)	12.3 (54.1)	5.5 (41.9)	−5 (23)	−14.6 (5.7)	2.8 (37.0)
Mean daily minimum °C (°F)	−21.4 (−6.5)	−18.2 (−0.8)	−10.7 (12.7)	−2 (28)	5.2 (41.4)	10.4 (50.7)	12.8 (55.0)	11.3 (52.3)	6.1 (43.0)	−0.1 (31.8)	−9.3 (15.3)	−19.2 (−2.6)	−2.9 (26.8)
Record low °C (°F)	−39.5 (−39.1)	−38.9 (−38.0)	−35.6 (−32.1)	−26.7 (−16.1)	−10 (14)	−2 (28)	3 (37)	0 (32)	−6.5 (20.3)	−21 (−6)	−35.5 (−31.9)	−37.5 (−35.5)	−39.5 (−39.1)
Average precipitation mm (inches)	25.2 (0.99)	20.8 (0.82)	31.4 (1.24)	33.4 (1.31)	53.4 (2.10)	81 (3.2)	71.1 (2.80)	70 (2.8)	57.7 (2.27)	38.4 (1.51)	29.8 (1.17)	30 (1.2)	542.3 (21.35)
Source: Environment Canada

== Demographics ==
In the 2021 Census of Population conducted by Statistics Canada, Elm Creek had a population of 405 living in 145 of its 155 total private dwellings, a change of 19.5% from its 2016 population of 339. With a land area of 2.68 km^{2} (1.03 sq mi), it had a population density of 151.1/km^{2} (391.4/sq mi) in 2021.

== Notable people ==
- Corinne Schroeder – goaltender for Seattle of the Professional Women's Hockey League, recorded the first shutout in league history and was nominated for Goaltender of the Year. Formerly played for the Boston Pride in the Premier Hockey Federation.
