= Municipality of Glenella-Lansdowne =

Rural municipality in Manitoba, Canada

Glenella – Lansdowne
- Rural municipality
- Municipality of Glenella – Lansdowne
- Location of the Municipality of Glenella-Lansdowne in Manitoba
- Coordinates: 50.453542°N 99.208855°W
- Country: Canada
- Province: Manitoba
- Region: Central Plains
- Incorporated (amalgamated): January 1, 2015
- Time zone: UTC-6 (CST)
  - Summer (DST): UTC-5 (CDT)
- Website: www.glenella.ca

The Municipality of Glenella – Lansdowne is a rural municipality (RM) in the Canadian province of Manitoba.

== History ==
It was incorporated on January 1, 2015 via the amalgamation of the RMs of Glenella and Lansdowne. It was formed as a requirement of The Municipal Amalgamations Act, which required that municipalities with a population less than 1,000 amalgamate with one or more neighbouring municipalities by 2015. The Government of Manitoba initiated these amalgamations in order for municipalities to meet the 1997 minimum population requirement of 1,000 to incorporate a municipality.

== Communities ==
- Arden
- Glenella
- Grass River
- Keyes
- Tenby
- Waldersee

== Demographics ==
In the 2021 Census of Population conducted by Statistics Canada, Glenella-Lansdowne had a population of 1,133 living in 375 of its 419 total private dwellings, a change of −4.1% from its 2016 population of 1,181. With a land area of 1,274.74 km^{2} (492.18 sq mi), it had a population density of 0.9/km^{2} (2.3/sq mi) in 2021.
