= Waldersee, Manitoba =

Hamlet in Manitoba, Canada

Coordinates: 50.5606°N 99.0544°W

Waldersee is a hamlet in the province of Manitoba, Canada. It is located approximately 85 km (53 mi) northwest of Portage la Prairie within the Municipality of Glenella – Lansdowne situated between Road 105 North and 106 North on Provincial Highway 260. There is a church, Christ Lutheran and cemetery belonging to the Evangelical Lutheran Church In Canada in the hamlet. The Big Grass river flows from northwest to southeast just to the southwest of the cemetery and church.
