= Glenella, Manitoba =

Community in Manitoba, Canada

Coordinates: 50°33′25″N 99°11′34″W

Glenella is a community within the Municipality of Glenella – Lansdowne. It is located northeast of Neepawa and was designated a post office and a CNR point in 1897. Its name came from a Miss Ella Williams with the addition of the "glen". The R.M. was created in 1920 and amalgamated in 2015.

== Railway station ==
Glenella is served by Via Rail's Winnipeg–Churchill train.

== Notable people ==
- Stephen Patrick - Politician and athlete.
