= Manitoba Highway 1 =

Trans-Canada Highway in Manitoba

Provincial Trunk Highway 1
- Trans-Canada Highway
- PTH 1 highlighted in red.

Route information
- Maintained by Manitoba Infrastructure
- Length: 488.8 km (303.7 mi)
- Existed: 1926–present

Major junctions
- West end: Highway 1 (TCH) at Saskatchewan border near Kirkella
- PTH 83 / PR 259 near Virden; PTH 21 near Griswold; PTH 10 in Brandon; PTH 5 near Carberry; PTH 16 (TCH) / YH / PR 305 near Portage la Prairie; PTH 100 (TCH) / PTH 101 / Route 85 in Winnipeg; PTH 59 / Route 20 in Winnipeg; PTH 12 near Ste. Anne; PTH 11 near Hadashville; PTH 44 near West Hawk Lake
- East end: Highway 17 / TCH at Ontario border near West Hawk Lake

Location
- Country: Canada
- Province: Manitoba
- Rural municipalities: Cartier; Cornwallis; Elton; Headingley; North Cypress – Langford; North Norfolk; Portage la Prairie; Reynolds; Sifton; Springfield; St. François Xavier; Ste. Anne; Taché; Wallace – Woodworth; Whitehead
- Major cities: Brandon; Portage la Prairie; Winnipeg
- Towns: Virden

Highway system
- Provincial highways in Manitoba; Winnipeg City Routes
← PR 596	→ PTH 1A (TCH)

Provincial Trunk Highway 1 (PTH 1) is Manitoba's section of the Trans-Canada Highway. It is a heavily used, 4-lane divided highway, with the exception of a short eighteen-kilometre (11 mi) section in the southeastern corner of the province. It is the main link between southern Manitoba's largest cities, and also serves as the province's main transportation link to the neighbouring provinces of Saskatchewan (to the west) and Ontario (to the east). The highway is the only major east–west divided highway in Manitoba, and carries a large majority of east–west traffic within and through the province. It has full freeway status sections at Portage la Prairie and Winnipeg. The total distance of the Trans-Canada Highway in Manitoba is approximately 490 kilometres (300 miles). The highway travels from the Saskatchewan border, west of Brandon, to the Ontario border east of Winnipeg.

PTH 1 is a very important part of the national highway system. It is the only road that links the province of Manitoba (and thus the entirety of Western Canada) with the province of Ontario, making it a major section of Canada's primary commercial and leisure route for all traffic travelling between Canada's largest cities, from Toronto and Montreal in the east to Calgary and Vancouver in the west.

== Routing ==
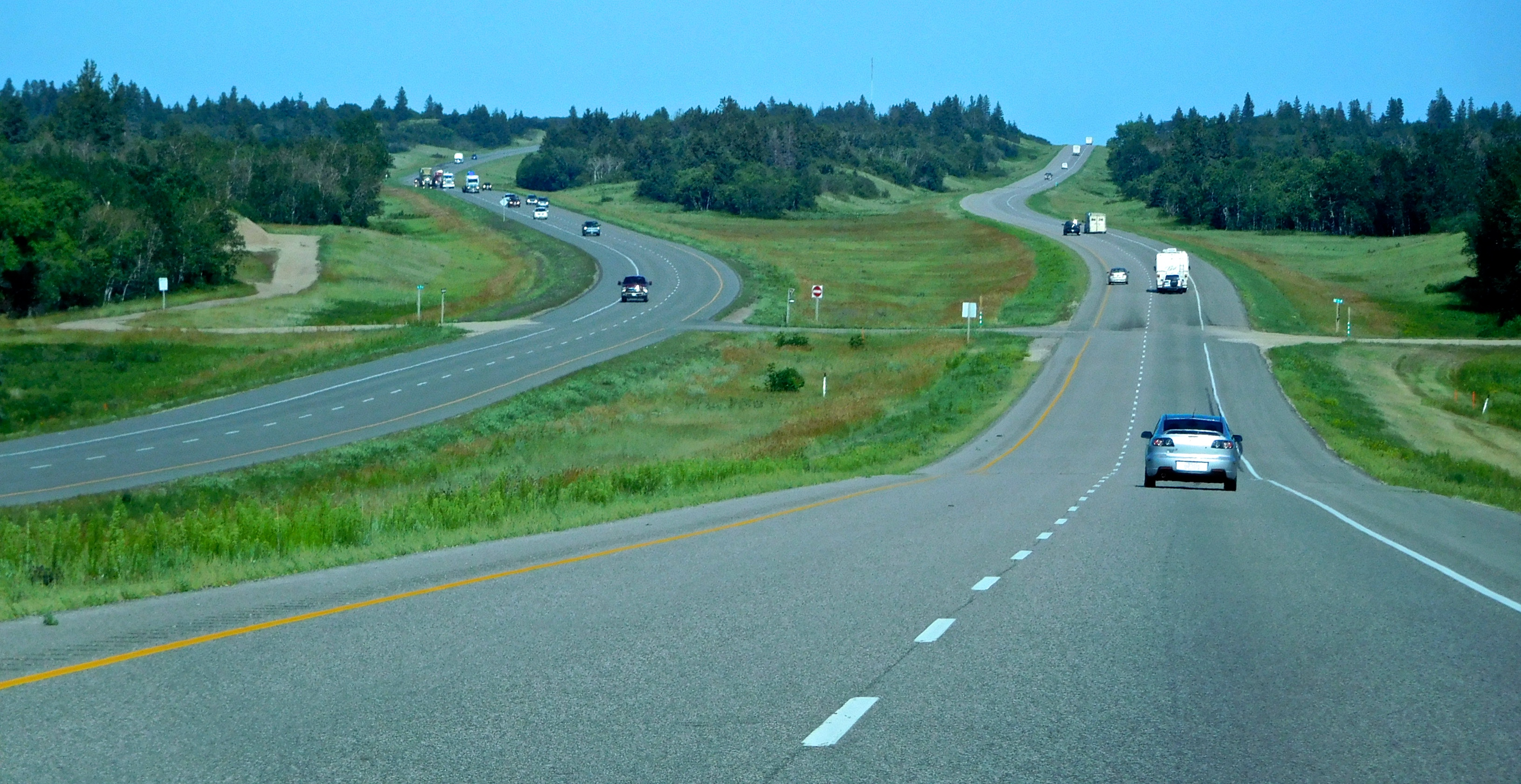
Eastbound on the Trans Canada Highway in south-western Manitoba near Carberry.

The highway is routed from west to east across the province of Manitoba. It begins at the western provincial boundary with Saskatchewan, connecting with Saskatchewan's Highway 1 to become Manitoba Trans-Canada 1. The highway is designated as T-C 1 throughout Manitoba until it reaches the eastern provincial boundary with Ontario, where it continues as the main route to Kenora, Ontario and the rest of Eastern Canada as Highway 17.

The entire length of the Trans-Canada Highway in the province of Manitoba is a 4-lane divided highway, with the exception of the Winnipeg city route and an 18-kilometre (11 mi) section in eastern Manitoba between the town of Falcon Lake and the Manitoba–Ontario provincial boundary which is a two-lane highway.

PTH 1 has full expressway status on the routes around Winnipeg on the Perimeter Highway, and around Portage la Prairie. Plans do exist to bring the entire length of PTH 1 (except the Winnipeg city route) to full expressway status in the future (mentioned at the list of Manitoba expressways). Currently, exit numbers only exist at three interchanges, and only small sections of PTH 1 and the Perimeter Highway have freeway status.

In the Winnipeg metro area, the Trans-Canada Highway has two official routes. The main route passes directly through the city of Winnipeg on city streets, entering the city from the west and continuing along Portage Avenue, Broadway, Main Street, Queen Elizabeth Way, St. Mary's Road, St. Anne's Road, and Fermor Avenue where it re-joins the Perimeter Highway (T-C 100) and continues east on TC 1. An alternate routing exits the main T-C 1 route on the western edge of Winnipeg onto the Perimeter Highway (T-C 100), which by-passes the city completely. The Perimeter Highway is a ring road which encircles Winnipeg and is frequently used by commuters and through traffic on the Trans Canada Highway wishing to avoid congested city streets.

== History ==
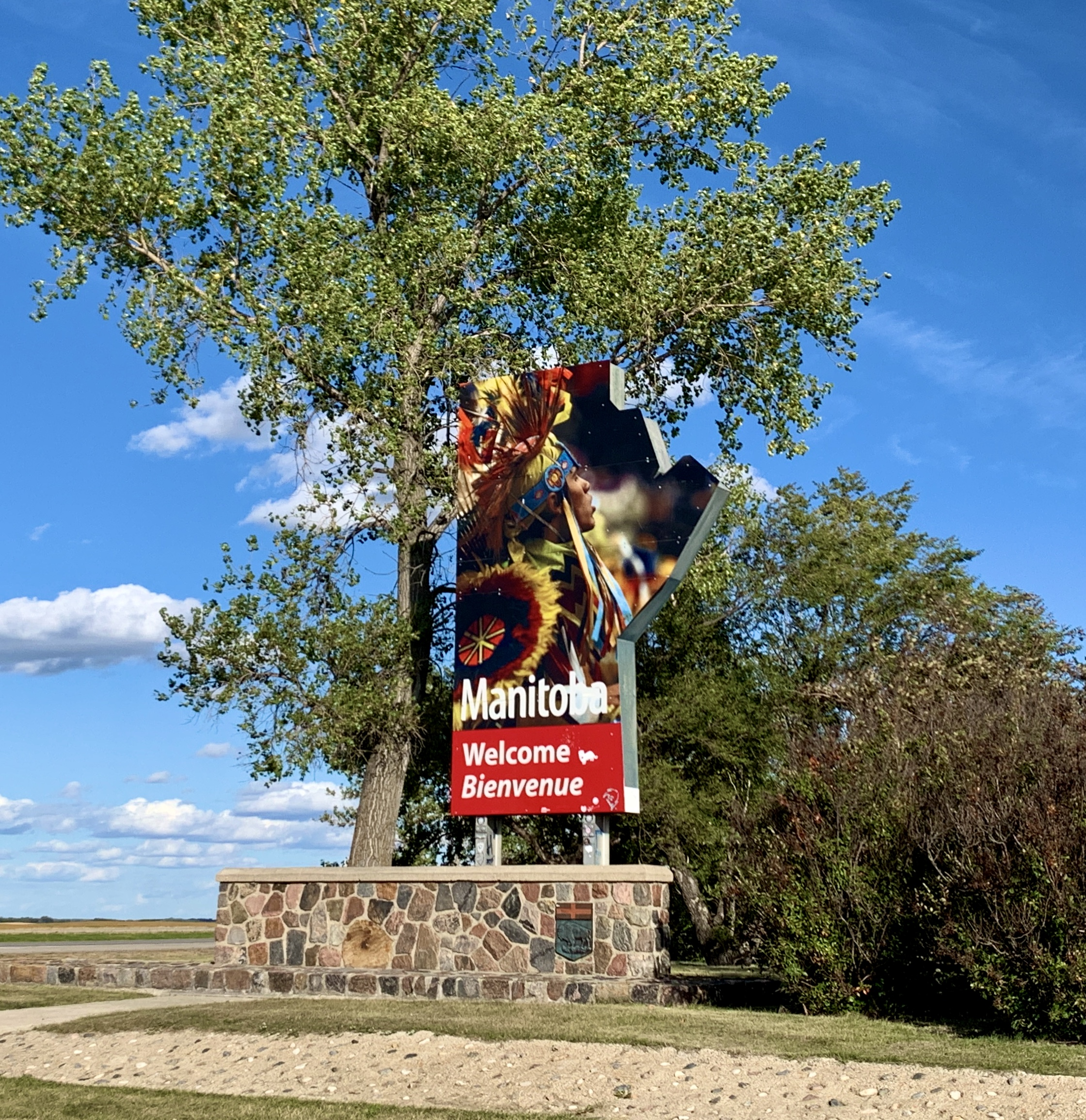
The "Manitoba Welcome/Bienvenue" sign, entering Manitoba from Saskatchewan at the provincial boundary on TCH 1.

The first Provincial Trunk Highways in Manitoba were numbered in 1926. The original Highway 1 was one of nine highways fanning out from Winnipeg, but was different in that it fanned out from the west and the east. Highway 1 was routed via many already-existing highways and provincial secondary roads. (From west to east), these are:

- Highway 1A into and out of Brandon
- Provincial Road 351 into and out of Carberry
- Highway 1A through Portage la Prairie
- Highway 26 from Portage la Prairie to Headingley
- Highway 9 from downtown Winnipeg to Lockport
- Highway 44 from Lockport to Whiteshell Provincial Park

In 1949, Highway 1 had been rerouted on new construction northeast of Griswold, with the part of old route from Highway 21 to Highway 28 (as well as Highway 28 itself) becoming part of Highway 21, and the section from Highway 21 eastward being removed from the system, but later becoming PR 455. By the early 1950s, Highway 1 had become an important east–west route in all of the western provinces. Most of the provincial highways that Highway 1 originally traversed on were re-numbered and designated as Highway 4 between 1958 and 1968, and the #1 was relocated to its present route. In 1962, the Trans-Canada Highway in Manitoba was fully completed, and Highway 1 across all of the western provinces was incorporated as part of the Trans-Canada Highway.

In 1955, most intra-city traffic in the Winnipeg area was diverted onto the (then) newly built Perimeter Highway. Later that year, the Perimeter Highway's southern (PTH 100) section was merged with the Trans-Canada Highway system, due to the amount of traffic using it to bypass the city. That section of the highway was highly used, and still is today.

=== Recent developments ===
On October 6, 2006 the Trans-Canada Highway Portage la Prairie by-pass was closed due to a structural defect found in the bridge over the CN Rail Line. On October 31, 2007, a $19 million project to rebuild the bridge was completed, and the by-pass was fully re-opened to traffic.

On October 25, 2007, a major federal/provincial construction project twinning the highway in western Manitoba between the Saskatchewan-Manitoba provincial boundary and the town of Hargrave was completed, with 34 kilometres (21 mi) of newly divided highway lanes opened to traffic.

On April 9, 2008, the Government of Manitoba announced that construction of a new interchange would begin in the summer of 2008 at the intersection of Highway 16 (the Yellowhead Highway) and the Trans Canada Highway mainline route, located a short distance west of Portage la Prairie. As of 2020, the option for a new interchange was replaced by a study to instead construct a roundabout at this intersection

== Speed limits ==
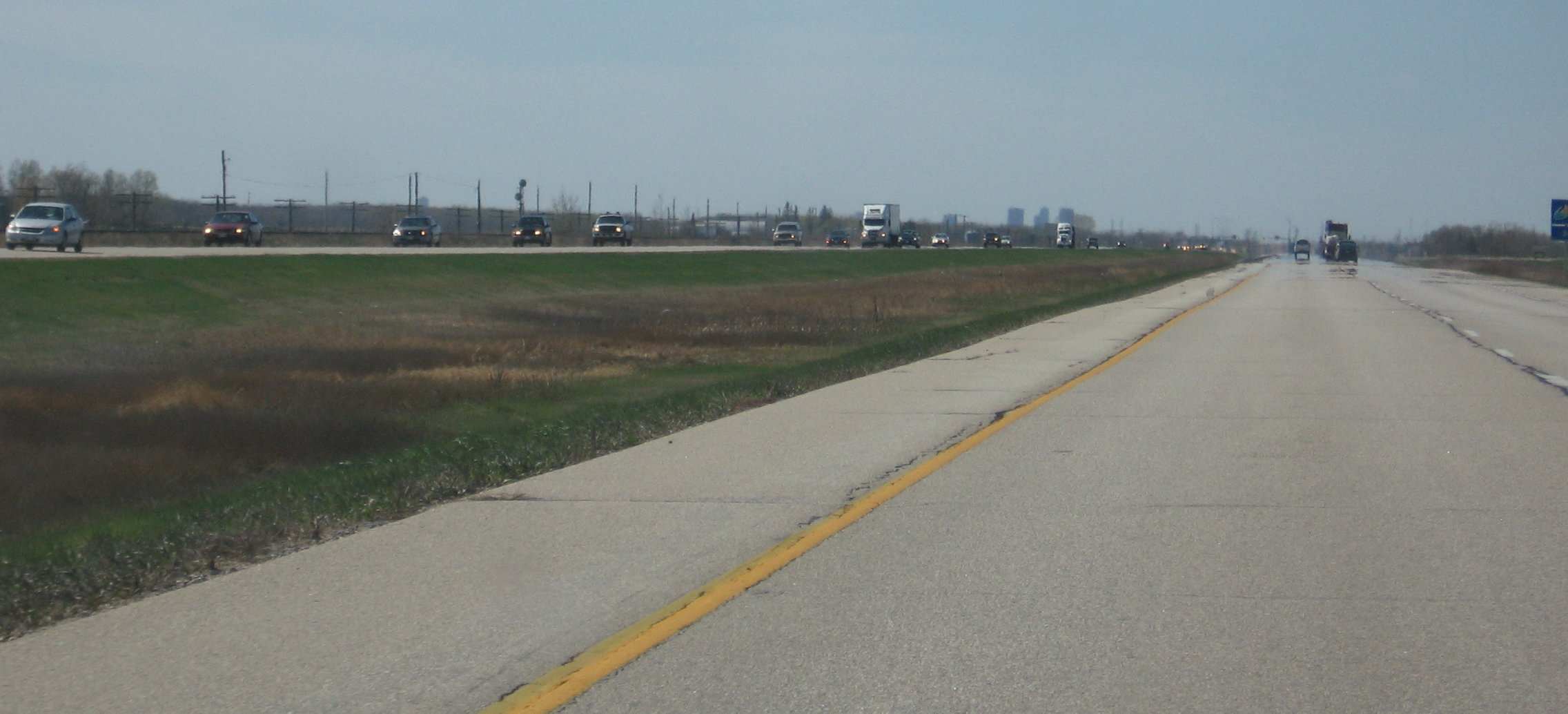
Westbound driving from Kenora, Ontario to Winnipeg, near Lorette (East of Winnipeg)

On February 27, 2008 the Manitoba Highway Traffic Board approved a request by the Government of Manitoba to raise the speed limit on the Trans Canada Highway in Manitoba to 110 km/h along the section between the Saskatchewan-Manitoba provincial boundary and Winnipeg. The speed limit was officially raised on July 1, 2009, though it was only raised on one portion of the highway between the Saskatchewan provincial boundary to Virden. On June 2, 2015, the speed limit between Virden and Headingley increased to 110 km/h, except at Brandon, Carberry, Portage la Prairie, and Elie, where speed is reduced due to major intersections at those locations. The portion of the highway from Winnipeg to the Ontario provincial boundary remains at 100 km/h.

Saskatchewan provincial boundary to Headingley- 110 km/h (70 mph)

Virden- 80 km/h (50 mph)

Brandon- 80 km/h (50 mph)

Carberry- 100 km/h (60 mph)

Portage la Prairie (Freeway)- 100 km/h (60 mph)

Elie- 80 km/h (50 mph)

Headingley-70 km/h (45 mph)

Winnipeg bypass (Perimeter Hwy. PTH #100) - 100 km/h (60 mph)

Winnipeg city route

Portage Ave. - 60 km/h (35 mph) (50 km/h (30 mph) in downtown)

Broadway - 50 km/h (30 mph)

Queen Elizabeth Way. (S. Main Street) - 60 km/h (35 mph)

St. Mary's Rd. - 60 km/h (35 mph)

St. Anne's Rd. - 60 km/h (35 mph)

Fermor Ave. (To Autumnwood Dr./Lakewood Blvd.) - 70 km/h (45 mph)

Fermor Ave. (To Lagimodiere Blvd.) 80 km/h (50 mph)

Fermor Ave. (To Perimeter Hwy.) - 90 km/h (55 mph)

Eastern Manitoba- 100 km/h (60 mph)

All at-grade intersections with traffic lights -80 km/h (50 mph)

== Major intersections ==
Division	Location	km	mi	Exit	Destinations	Notes
Wallace – Woodworth		0.0	0.0	—	Highway 1 (TCH) west – Regina	Continuation into Saskatchewan
Wallace – Woodworth	Kirkella	5.5	3.4		PTH 41 north – St. Lazare; PR 542 south – Kola	
Wallace – Woodworth	Elkhorn	17.1	10.6		PR 256 (Cavendish Street) – Willen, Cromer, Elkhorn	
Wallace – Woodworth	Elkhorn	18.5	11.5		Richhill Avenue E / Road 66 N	Former PR 441 east
Wallace – Woodworth	Hargrave	31.2	19.4		Road 159 W	Former PR 252 south
Wallace – Woodworth		34.8	21.6		PTH 83 north – Birtle	West end of PTH 83 concurrency
Wallace – Woodworth		41.6	25.8		PTH 83 south – Melita; PR 259 east – Kenton	East end of PTH 83 concurrency
Town of Virden		44.5	27.7		King Street E / Commonwealth Drive	
Wallace – Woodworth		46.6	29.0		PR 257 west – Kola	
Sifton		62.8	39.0		PR 254 south – Oak Lake Beach	West end of PR 254 concurrency
Sifton	Oak Lake	68.0	42.3		PR 254 north	East end of PR 254 concurrency
Sifton–Whitehead municipality line	Griswold	81.7	50.8		PTH 21 – Shoal Lake, Sioux Valley, Hartney	
Whitehead	Alexander	94.9	59.0		PR 250 north – Rivers	West end of PR 250 concurrency
Whitehead		98.4	61.1		PR 250 south – Souris	East end of PR 250 concurrency
Whitehead	Kemnay	106.8	66.4		PTH 1A (TCH) east (City Route) – Brandon	Low bridge east of Kemnay; eastbound vehicles higher than 3.7m (12 ft) advised to stay on TCH
Whitehead		110.8	68.8	Crosses the Assiniboine River		
Whitehead	Grand Valley Provincial Park	111.5	69.3		PR 459 east (Grand Valley Road) – Grand Valley Provincial Park, Brandon	Interchange
Elton / Cornwallis		115.1	71.5		PR 270 north – Rapid City, Rivers	
City of Brandon		121.3	75.4		PTH 10 south (18th Street) – Brandon, Boissevain	West end of PTH 10 concurrency
City of Brandon		123.0	76.4		PTH 1A (TCH) west (City Route / 1st Street) – Brandon; PTH 10 north (John Bracken Highway) – Dauphin	East end of PTH 10 concurrency
Elton / Cornwallis		127.8	79.4		PTH 110 south – Boissevain	
Elton / Cornwallis		131.1	81.5		PR 468 – Justice, Chater	
Elton		140.0	87.0		PR 340 south – Douglas	
North Cypress – Langford		148.2	92.1		PR 464 north – Brookdale	
North Cypress – Langford		149.6	93.0		PR 351 east	
North Cypress – Langford		164.6	102.3		PTH 5 (Parks Route) – Neepawa, Carberry	Former PR 258; site of the 2023 Carberry highway collision; interchange proposed
North Cypress – Langford–North Norfolk municipality line		182.7	113.5		PR 351 west – Melbourne	
North Norfolk	Sidney	184.3	114.5		PR 352 – Firdale, Sidney	
North Norfolk	Austin	196.4	122.0		PTH 34 – Gladstone, Holland	
North Norfolk	MacGregor	210.0	130.5		PR 350 – Katrime, Lavenham, MacGregor	
North Norfolk	Bagot	219.8	136.6		PR 242 – Westbourne, Treherne, Bagot	
Portage la Prairie		231.3	143.7		PTH 16 (TCH) west / YH – Neepawa, Saskatoon; PR 305 south – St. Claude	West end of Yellowhead Highway concurrency
Portage la Prairie		237.5	147.6	Crosses the Portage Diversion (Assiniboine River Floodway)		
Portage la Prairie		238.9	148.4	—	PTH 1A (TCH) east (City Route) – Portage la Prairie	Interchange
City of Portage la Prairie		246.6	153.2	—	PR 240 – Southport, St. Claude	Interchange
Portage la Prairie		250.7	155.8	—	PTH 1A (TCH) west (City Route) – Portage la Prairie	Interchange; no eastbound exit
Portage la Prairie		251.9	156.5		PTH 26 east (Chemin Assiniboine Trail) – Poplar Point	Former PTH 1 & 4 east
Portage la Prairie		260.0	161.6	Crosses the Assiniboine River		
Portage la Prairie		266.7	165.7		PTH 13 south – Oakville, Carman; PR 430 north – St. Ambroise	
Portage la Prairie		275.2	171.0		Road 19 West	Former PR 331 west
Cartier		278.6	173.1		Benard Road	Former PR 426 north
Cartier	Elie	285.4	177.3		PR 248 – St. Eustache, Elie	
Cartier		294.1	182.7		PR 332 south – Dacotah, Starbuck	
Cartier		301.5	187.3		PR 424	Former PR 241
Cartier–St. François Xavier municipality line		303.1	188.3	Crosses the Assiniboine River		
St. François Xavier		303.9	188.8		PTH 26 west (Chemin Assiniboine Trail) – St. François Xavier	Former PTH 1 & 4 west
Headingley		311.0	193.2		Dodds Road	Former west end of PR 334 concurrency
Headingley		311.4	193.5		PR 334 south	Former east end of PR 334 concurrency. PR 334's northern terminus is now here.
City of Winnipeg		317.0	197.0	318	Perimeter Highway (PTH 100 east / PTH 101 north) / Route 85 begins – Kenora	Interchange; signed as exits 318A (east) and 318B (north); PTH 100 / PTH 101 exit 42; west end of Route 85 (Portage Avenue) concurrency
City of Winnipeg		321.7	199.9		Moray Street (Route 96 south)	
City of Winnipeg		326.0	202.6		Route 90 (Century Street) – Airport	Interchange; to PTH 7 north
City of Winnipeg		326.5	202.9		Empress Street – Polo Park	Interchange; eastbound access to Route 90 north
City of Winnipeg		329.0	204.4		Portage Avenue (Route 85 east) / YH / Broadway	PTH 1 turns onto Broadway; east end of Yellowhead Highway / Route 85 concurrency
City of Winnipeg		329.3– 329.5	204.6– 204.7		Maryland Street (Route 70 south); Sherbrook Street (Route 70 north)	One-way pair
City of Winnipeg		330.1	205.1		Osborne Street (Route 62)	Manitoba Legislative Building
City of Winnipeg		330.9– 331.0	205.6– 205.7		Donald Street (Route 42 south); Smith Street (Route 42 north)	One-way pair; to PTH 75 south
City of Winnipeg		331.3	205.9		Main Street (Route 52 north)	PTH 1 turns onto Main Street; west end of Route 52 concurrency; to PTH 9 north
City of Winnipeg		331.7	206.1	Main Street Bridge crosses the Assiniboine River		
City of Winnipeg		331.9	206.2		River Avenue (via Stradbrook Avenue)	No westbound access
City of Winnipeg		332.1	206.4	Norwood Bridge crosses the Red River		
City of Winnipeg		332.3	206.5		Marion Street (Route 115 east)	No eastbound access; to PTH 15 east
City of Winnipeg		334.7	208.0		St. Anne's Road (Route 150 begins) / St. Mary's Road (Route 52 south)	PTH 1 turns on St. Annes's Road; east end of Route 52 concurrency; west end of Route 150 concurrency; Route 150 northern terminus
City of Winnipeg		335.9	208.7		Fermor Avenue (Route 135 west) / St. Anne's Road (Route 150 south)	PTH 1 turns onto Fermor Avenue; east end of Route 150 concurrency; west end of Route 135 concurrency
City of Winnipeg		337.2	209.5		Archibald Street (Route 30 north)	
City of Winnipeg		337.9	210.0		PTH 59 / Lagimodiere Boulevard (Route 20)	
City of Winnipeg		339.5	211.0		Route 135 ends	Winnipeg City Limits; east end of Route 135 concurrency
Springfield		342.5	212.8	—	Plessis Road north	Interchange
Springfield		347.0	215.6	348	Perimeter Highway (PTH 100 west / PTH 101 north) – Brandon	Interchange; signed as exits 348A (west) and 348B (north)
Springfield		347.6	216.0	Crosses the Red River Floodway		
Springfield	Deacon's Corner	349.5	217.2		PR 207 – Lorette	
Taché		357.4	222.1		PR 206 north – Dugald, Oakbank	West end of PR 206 concurrency
Taché		359.4	223.3		PR 206 south – Landmark	East end of PR 206 concurrency
Taché		363.3	225.7		PR 501 east (Rosewood Road)	
Taché		367.3	228.2		To PR 207 (Dawson Road) – Dufresne	
Ste. Anne		374.2	232.5	375	PTH 12 (MOM's Way) – Beausejour, Steinbach, Ste. Anne	Interchange; signed as exits 375A (south) and 375B (north)
Ste. Anne	La Coulée	382.5	237.7		PR 207 west (Dawson Road)	
Ste. Anne	Richer	389.0	241.7		PR 302 – Ross, Richer	
Reynolds		415.5	258.2		Spruce Siding	Former PR 506 east
Reynolds		429.0	266.6		PTH 11 north – Lac du Bonnet, Hadashville	
Reynolds		431.1	267.9		PR 503 east (Old Dawson Trail)	
Reynolds	Prawda	437.2	271.7		PR 506 north	
Reynolds		451.0	280.2		PR 308 south – East Braintree	
No. 1		468.3	291.0	Enters Whiteshell Provincial Park		
No. 1	Falcon Lake	473.6	294.3	—	PR 301 east – Falcon Lake	Interchange
No. 1		484.7	301.2	—	PTH 44 west – West Hawk Lake	Interchange; former PTH 1 & 4 west
No. 1		488.8	303.7	—	Highway 17 east / TCH – Kenora	Continuation into Ontario
1.000 mi = 1.609 km; 1.000 km = 0.621 mi: Concurrency terminus; Incomplete access; Route transition

== Related routes ==
=== Provincial Trunk Highway 1A ===
Provincial Trunk Highway 1A
- Victoria Avenue, 1st Street (Brandon); Saskatchewan Avenue (Portage la Prairie)
- Location: Brandon, Portage la Prairie
- Existed: 1959–present

Provincial Trunk Highway 1A (PTH 1A) is the designation of two business loops off of PTH 1, serving the cities of Brandon and Portage la Prairie, both of which are former alignments of the Trans-Canada before being bypassed.

=== Provincial Road 301 ===
Provincial Route 301
- Location: Whiteshell Provincial Park
- Length: 11.5 km (7.1 mi)
- Existed: 1966–present

Provincial Road 301 (PR 301) is a 11.5-kilometre-long (7.1 mi) east-west spur off of PTH 1 near the Ontario border, situated wholly inside Whiteshell Provincial Park.

It begins at an interchange with the Trans-Canada Highway at the Falcon Lake community, winding its way eastward along the northern shoreline of Falcon Lake, where it provides access to Faloma and Toniata. The highway now heads inland, curving northward to pass underneath PTH 1, without an interchange, before travelling past Star Lake. PR 301 comes to an end shortly thereafter at an intersection with PTH 44 (La Vérendrye Trail) near West Hawk Lake. The entire length of PR 301 is a paved two-lane highway.

Division	Location	km	mi	Destinations	Notes
Whiteshell Provincial Park	Falcon Lake	0.0	0.0	PTH 1 (TCH) – Winnipeg, Kenora; Falcon Boulevard – Falcon Lake	Western terminus; interchange
Whiteshell Provincial Park	Faloma	5.9	3.7	F7 – Faloma	
Whiteshell Provincial Park	Toniata	7.5	4.7	Toniata	
Whiteshell Provincial Park		11.5	7.1	PTH 44 (La Vérendrye Trail) – Rennie, West Hawk Lake	Eastern terminus
1.000 mi = 1.609 km; 1.000 km = 0.621 mi

=== Provincial Road 351 ===
Provincial Road 351
- Location: Carberry
- Length: 37.3 km (23.2 mi)
- Existed: 1966–present

Provincial Road 351 (PR 351) runs for 37.3 kilometres (23.2 mi) along a former alignment of PTH 1 in the Municipality of North Cypress-Langford. Serving as a loop route off of the Trans-Canada, it provides access to both the town of Carberry and the historic Camp Hughes.

=== Provincial Road 455 ===
Provincial Road 455
- Location: Rural Municipality of Whitehead
- Length: 11.6 km (7.2 mi)
- Existed: 1966–present

Provincial Road 455 (PR 455) is a 11.6-kilometre-long (7.2 mi) east-west spur of PTH 21 in the Rural Municipality of Whitehead, providing access to the town of Alexander. It runs entirely along a pre-1949 alignment of PTH 1.

=== Provincial Road 459 ===
Provincial Road 459
- Grand Valley Road, Wokiksuye Ċanku
- Location: Brandon
- Length: 9.5 km (5.9 mi)
- Existed: 1966–present

Provincial Road 459 (PR 459) is a 9.5-kilometre-long (5.9 mi) east-west spur of PTH 1 into the north side of the city of Brandon.

=== Provincial Road 501 ===
Provincial Road 501
- Rosewood Road
- Location: Rural Municipality of Taché
- Length: 26.0 km (16.2 mi)
- Existed: 1966–present

Provincial Road 501 (PR 501) is a 26.0-kilometre-long (16.2 mi) east-west spur of PTH 1 in the Rural Municipality of Taché, providing access to the hamlets of Rosewood, Ste. Geneviève, and Ross. It is a paved two-lane highway for its entire length, the majority of which goes by the street name Rosewood Road.

Division	Location	km	mi	Destinations	Notes
Taché		0.0	0.0	PTH 1 (TCH) – Kenora, Winnipeg	Western terminus; road continues south as Road 30E
Taché		9.9	6.2	PTH 12 – Anola, Ste. Anne	
Taché	Ste. Geneviève	18.1	11.2	Saltel Street – Ste. Geneviève	
Taché		23.0	14.3	PR 302 – Ostenfeld, Richer	
Taché	Ross	26.0	16.2	Road 45E	End of provincial maintenance at railroad crossing; eastern terminus; road continues north as Road 45E
1.000 mi = 1.609 km; 1.000 km = 0.621 mi

== See also ==
Trans-Canada Highway
Previous routes SK Highway 1 Provincial Trunk Highway 16 Perimeter Highway	Provincial Trunk Highway 1	Next routes ON Highway 17 Perimeter Highway
Yellowhead Highway
Previous route Provincial Trunk Highway 16	Provincial Trunk Highway 1	Next route Route 85
