= Manitoba Provincial Road 350 =

Provincial road in Manitoba, Canada

Provincial Road 350
- PR 350 highlighted in red

Route information
- Maintained by Department of Infrastructure
- Length: 55.2 km (34.3 mi)
- Existed: 1966–present

Major junctions
- North end: PTH 16 (TCH) / YH near Woodside
- PTH 1 (TCH) near MacGregor
- South end: PR 242 near Lavenham

Location
- Country: Canada
- Province: Manitoba
- Rural municipalities: Norfolk Treherne; North Norfolk; WestLake – Gladstone

Highway system
- Provincial highways in Manitoba; Winnipeg City Routes
← PR 349	→ PR 351

Provincial Road 350 (PR 350) is a 55.2-kilometre-long (34.3 mi) north-south highway in the Central Plains Region of the Canadian province of Manitoba.

== Route description ==
The route begins at PR 242 east of Lavenham, and terminates at the Yellowhead Highway near Woodside.

From PR 242, the road travels 7 kilometres (4.3 mi) west through Lavenham before turning north for 3 kilometres (1.9 mi) just past the community. PR 350 then turns west for 4 kilometres (2.5 mi) before turning north once again at Mile 56N (formerly westbound PR 461). It continues for 17 kilometres (11 mi) through MacGregor before intersecting the Trans-Canada Highway just north of the village. Past this intersection, PR 350 continues north for 24 kilometres (15 mi) to its northern terminus, passing the community of Katrime at around the midway point.

PR 350 is mainly a gravel road with a small paved section as it passes through MacGregor.

== History ==
In the early 1990s, the Manitoba government decommissioned a number of provincial secondary roads and returned the maintenance of these roads back to the rural municipalities. A section of the original PR 350 was included in this decommissioning.

Prior to this, PR 350 continued south past Lavenham for 3 kilometres (1.9 mi) before turning west and travelling in this direction for 3 kilometres (1.9 mi). The road then turned south before gradually turning west for 12 kilometres (7.5 mi) to its southbound terminus with PTH 34 on the eastern edge of the Spruce Woods Provincial Wildlife Management Area.

After the decommissioning of this section, the road was renamed Ladysmith Road. It is now maintained by the Rural Municipality of Victoria.

The original length of PR 350 was 67 kilometres (42 mi).

== Major intersections ==
Division	Location	km	mi	Destinations	Notes
Norfolk Treherne / North Norfolk boundary		0.0	0.0	PR 242 – Rossendale, Treherne	Southern terminus; begins following former PR 461
Norfolk Treherne / North Norfolk boundary	Lavenham	5.5	3.4	2nd Street – Lavenham	Former PR 350 south
North Norfolk		13.1	8.1	Road 56N	Former PR 461 west
North Norfolk	MacGregor	29.5	18.3	Hampton Street E – MacGregor	Pavement begins
North Norfolk	MacGregor	30.5	19.0	PTH 1 (TCH) – Brandon, Portage la Prairie	Pavement ends
WestLake-Gladstone	Woodside	55.2	34.3	PTH 16 (TCH) / YH – Gladstone, Westbourne	Northern terminus
1.000 mi = 1.609 km; 1.000 km = 0.621 mi
