= Manitoba Provincial Road 459 =

Provincial road in Manitoba, Canada

Provincial Road 459
- Grand Valley Road; Wokiksuye Ċanku

Route information
- Maintained by Department of Infrastructure
- Length: 9.5 km (5.9 mi)
- Existed: 1966–present

Major junctions
- West end: PTH 1 (TCH) at Grand Valley Provincial Park
- East end: PTH 10 (18th Street N.) in Brandon

Location
- Country: Canada
- Province: Manitoba
- Rural municipalities: Cornwallis; Whitehead
- Major cities: Brandon

Highway system
- Provincial highways in Manitoba; Winnipeg City Routes
← PR 458	→ PR 462

Provincial Road 459 (PR 459), known as Grand Valley Road and honorarily as Wokiksuye Ċanku, is a short provincial road in the southwest part of the Canadian province of Manitoba.

== Route description ==
Provincial Road 459 is an east–west route and runs from the Trans-Canada Highway near the Grand Valley Provincial Campground to its terminus at PTH 10 (18th Street North) in Brandon.

PR 459 serves as a feeder route for communities located on the north end of Brandon from the Trans-Canada Highway as well as to the Brandon Experimental Station. The road travels in very close proximity to the Assiniboine River for most of its length, and offers a very scenic alternative route for people travelling in to Brandon as compared to the Trans-Canada Highway or PTH 1A.

Due to its close proximity to the Assiniboine River, a portion of the road was closed when the river overflowed its banks in the spring of 2011. Since then, PR 459 has been subject to spring closures to prevent future flooding incidents.

In 2022, the portion of PR 459 within Brandon's city limits was given the honorary name Wokiksuye Ċanku (Remembrance Road in the Dakota language), in honour of children taken to residential schools. The road leads to the site of the former Brandon Indian Residential School.

PR 459 is a paved road for its entire length. The speed limit along this road is 90 kilometres per hour (56 mph).

== Major intersections ==
Division	Location	km	mi	Destinations	Notes
Whitehead	Grand Valley Provincial Park	0.0	0.0	PTH 1 (TCH) – Regina, Brandon; Grand Valley Road	Western terminus; interchange; road continues west as Grand Valley Road
Whitehead	Grand Valley Provincial Park	0.5	0.31	Grand Valley Provincial Park	Access road into park
Cornwallis	No major junctions				
City of Brandon		7.9	4.9	34th Street N (Road 111W) – Brandon Indian Residential School, Brandon Research and Development Centre	
City of Brandon		9.5	5.9	PTH 10 (18th Street N / John Bracken Highway) – Minnedosa, Brandon; Kirkcaldy Drive – Riverbank Discovery Centre	Eastern terminus; road continues east as Kirkcaldy Drive
1.000 mi = 1.609 km; 1.000 km = 0.621 mi
