= Manitoba Provincial Road 352 =

Provincial road in Manitoba, Canada

Provincial Road 352
- PR 352 highlighted in red

Route information
- Maintained by Department of Infrastructure
- Length: 92.6 km (57.5 mi)
- Existed: 1966–present

Major junctions
- North end: PTH 5 near Birnie
- PTH 16 (TCH) / YH near Arden; PTH 1 (TCH) in Sidney
- South end: PTH 34 near Arizona

Location
- Country: Canada
- Province: Manitoba
- Rural municipalities: Glenella – Lansdowne; North Cypress – Langford; North Norfolk; Rosedale

Highway system
- Provincial highways in Manitoba; Winnipeg City Routes
← PR 351	→ PR 353

Provincial Road 352 (PR 352) is a 92.6-kilometre-long (57.5 mi) north-south highway that straddles the border between the Central Plains, Westman, and Parkland regions of the Canadian province of Manitoba.

== Route description ==
PR 352 begins at PTH 5 near Birnie, and terminates at the PTH 34 near Arizona. Although the route is marked north–south, PR 352 travels in a northwest–southeast direction for most of its length.

From PTH 5, it travels 7 kilometres (4.3 mi) east through Birnie before turning southeast at Mile 83W (formerly PR 575). From this point, PR 352 continues for 7 kilometres (4.3 mi) to its intersection with PR 265. South of PR 265, the road continues in the same southeasterly direction for another 19 kilometres (12 mi) through the community of Arden until it intersects with PTH 16 south of that community. After a very short concurrence west, PR 352 continues southeast from PTH 16, travelling 36 kilometres (22 mi) to meet PTH 1 at Sidney. Along the way, the road passes through the unincorporated communities of Edrans and Firdale. About 3 kilometres (1.9 mi) south of Edrans, PR 352 turns straight south, and maintains this direction (with a very short jaunt to the east near Firdale) until its intersection with PTH 1. After another short eastern jaunt near Sidney, it continues south for another 9 kilometres (5.6 mi). From this point the road goes east for 9 kilometres (5.6 mi) through Arizona to its southbound terminus.

The route is gravel for most of its length, with two paved sections: one from PTH 5 to Birnie, and the other from PTH 16 to Arden.

== Major intersections ==
Division	Location	km	mi	Destinations	Notes
North Norfolk		0.0	0.0	PTH 34 – Austin, Holland	Southern terminus; road continues east as Great Carlton School Road (Road 56N)
North Norfolk	Sidney	18.9	11.7	PTH 1 (TCH) – Brandon, Portage la Prairie	
North Cypress-Langford		35.7	22.2	Road 70N – Wellwood	Former PR 353 west
North Cypress-Langford	Edrans	37.5	23.3	Road 71N – Pine Creek Station	Former PR 353 east
Glenella-Lansdowne		58.9	36.6	PTH 16 (TCH) west / YH – Neepawa	Southern end of PTH 16 concurrency
Glenella-Lansdowne		59.2	36.8	PTH 16 (TCH) east / YH – Gladstone	Northern end of PTH 16 concurrency
Glenella-Lansdowne		59.9	37.2	Bridge over the Whitemud River	
Glenella-Lansdowne		78.9	49.0	PR 265 – Eden, Plumas	
Glenella-Lansdowne		86.0	53.4	Road 83W	Former PR 575 east
Rosedale		92.6	57.5	PTH 5 (Parks Route) – Neepawa, McCreary	Northern terminus; road continues west as Road 98N
1.000 mi = 1.609 km; 1.000 km = 0.621 mi: Concurrency terminus
