= Manitoba Provincial Road 351 =

Provincial road in Manitoba, Canada

Provincial Road 351
- PR 351 highlighted in red

Route information
- Maintained by Department of Infrastructure
- Length: 37.3 km (23.2 mi)
- Existed: 1966–present

Major junctions
- West end: PTH 1 (TCH) near Camp Hughes
- PTH 5 at Carberry
- East end: PTH 1 (TCH) near Sidney

Location
- Country: Canada
- Province: Manitoba
- Rural municipalities: North Cypress – Langford, North Norfolk
- Towns: Carberry

Highway system
- Provincial highways in Manitoba; Winnipeg City Routes
← PR 350	→ PR 352

Provincial Road 351 (PR 351) is a 37.3-kilometre-long (23.2 mi) east-west highway in the Westman and Central Plains regions of the Canadian province of Manitoba.

== Route description ==
PR 351 is a short east-west highway that begins and ends at the Trans-Canada Highway. The western terminus is located near the unincorporated community of Hughes, while the eastern terminus is just west of Sidney. PR 351 provides direct east-west access to both the historic Camp Hughes and the town of Carberry, where it is known as 1st Avenue within the town limits.

PR 351 is paved for its entire length.

== History ==
PR 351 was part of the original Highway 1 prior to 1958.

In 1962, Highway 1 became part of the Trans-Canada Highway. The current configuration of Highway 1 began construction in 1957 and was opened to traffic the following year, putting the new route 3 kilometres (1.9 mi) north of Carberry. The route was given its current designation when the Manitoba government implemented its secondary highway system in 1966.

== Major intersections ==
Division	Location	km	mi	Destinations	Notes
North Cypress-Langford		0.0	0.0	PTH 1 (TCH) – Brandon, Portage la Prairie	Western terminus; road continues west as Road 61N
North Cypress-Langford		2.0	1.2	Camp Hughes Road (Road 91W) – Camp Hughes	
Town of Carberry		17.1	10.6	PTH 5 (Parks Route) to PTH 1 (TCH) – Neepawa, Glenboro	
North Cypress-Langford	Melbourne	28.6	17.8	Melbourne Road (Road 76W) – Melbourne	
North Cypress-Langford / North Norfolk boundary		37.3	23.2	PTH 1 (TCH) – Brandon, Portage la Prairie	Eastern terminus; road continues north as Road 72W
1.000 mi = 1.609 km; 1.000 km = 0.621 mi
