= Arizona, Manitoba =

Arizona
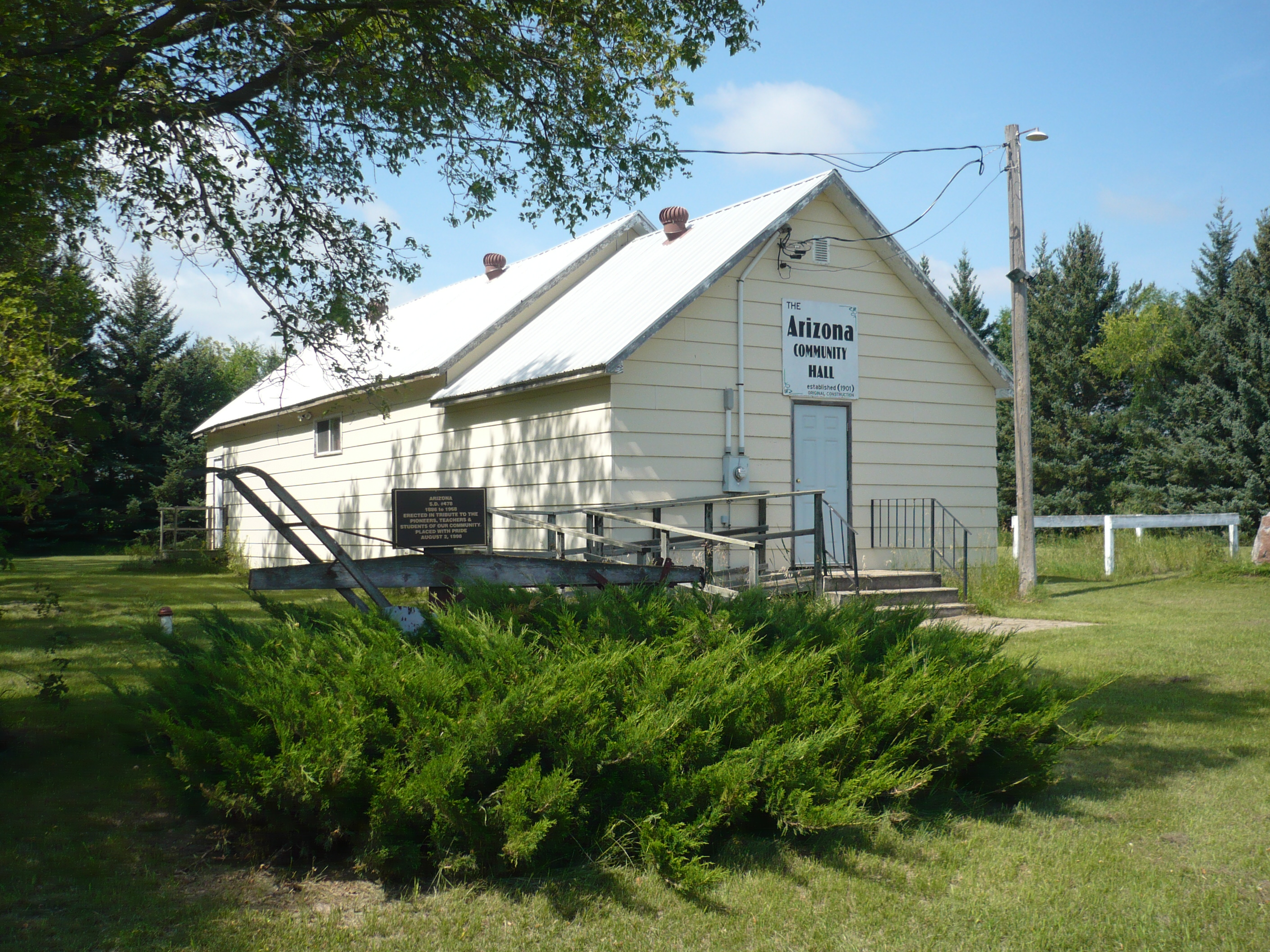
- Arizona Community Hall

- Location of Arizona in Manitoba
- Coordinates: 49°49′42″N 99°1′40″W
- Country: Canada
- Province: Manitoba
- Region: Central Plains
- Census Division: No. 8

Government
  - Governing Body: Municipality of North Norfolk
  - MP: Branden Leslie
  - MLA: Jodie Byram
- Time zone: UTC−6 (CST)
  - Summer (DST): UTC−5 (CDT)
- Area codes: 204, 431
- NTS Map: 062G14
- GNBC Code: GAAZJ

Arizona is a locality in the Municipality of North Norfolk in south central Manitoba, Canada. It is located approximately 66 kilometers (41 miles) east of Brandon, Manitoba, about 377m above sea level in an area which experiences frequent drought.

A post office operated under this name from 1892 to 1904 on 9-10-12W. There was also a school district. The school, located on SE 16-10-12W, was first a log building constructed in 1888, and later a brick building in 1921. Another building was brought from another municipality in 1963. Arizona school was closed in 1968.

In 1898 a Presbyterian Church was built in Arizona. This church was later used by Methodists and later became part of the United Church of Canada. In 1974 money was raised to have the building moved to the Manitoba Agricultural Museum.

Arizona also has a community hall that was built in 1901.

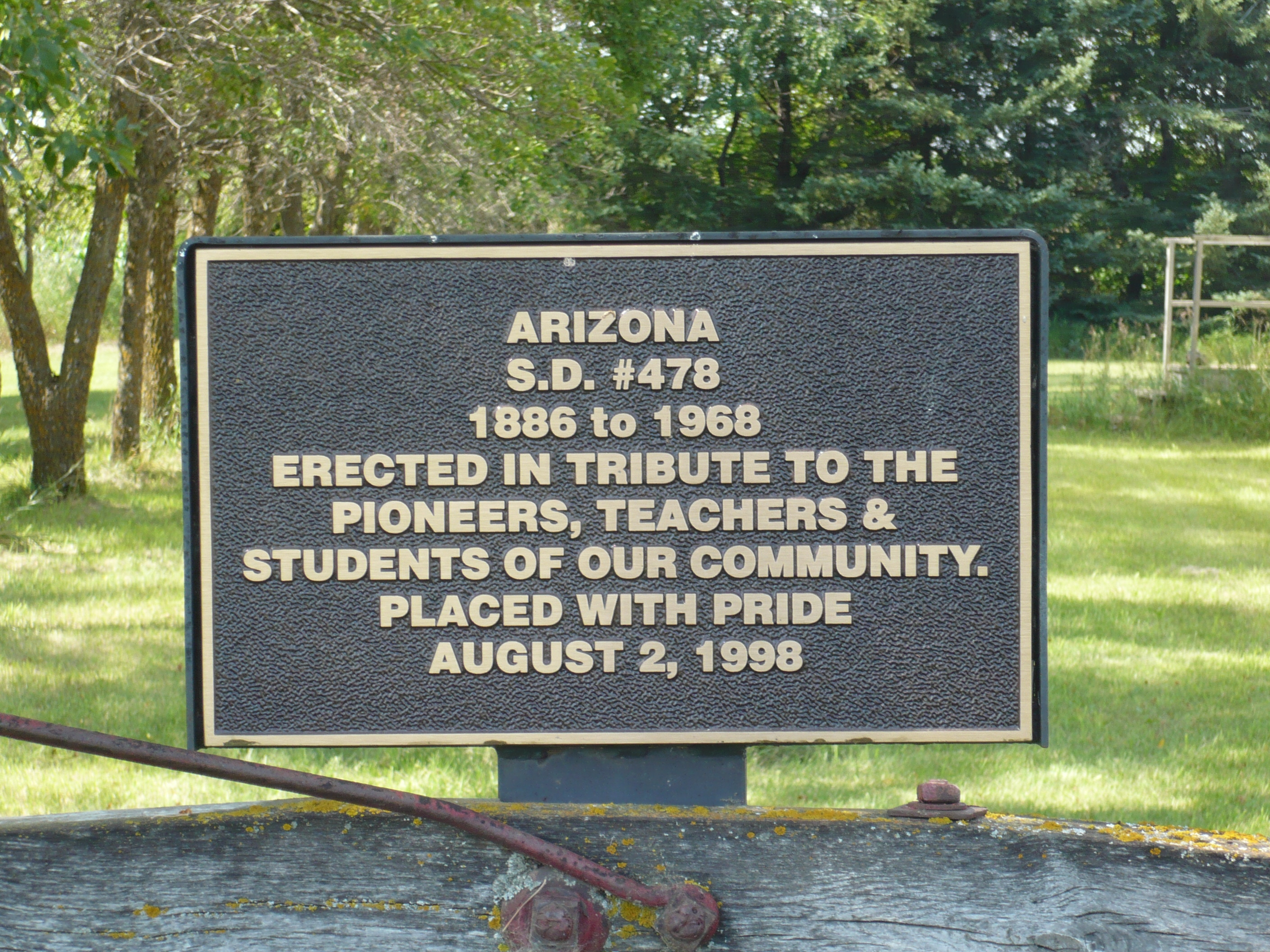
Plaque Commemorating Arizona School District #478
