= Bagot, Manitoba =

Town in Manitoba, Canada

Bagot
- Location of Bagot in Manitoba
- Coordinates: 49°58′9″N 98°37′48″W
- Country: Canada
- Province: Manitoba
- Region: Central Plains
- Census Division: No. 8

Government
  - Mayor: Travis Nearing
  - MLA: Jodie Byram
- Time zone: UTC−6 (CST)
  - Summer (DST): UTC−5 (CDT)
- Postal Code: R0H 0E0
- Area codes: 204, 431
- NTS Map: 062G15
- GNBC Code: GABLM
- motto- Facta Non Verba

Bagot is an unincorporated community located in the Municipality of North Norfolk in south central Manitoba, Canada. The town is located approximately 24 kilometers (15 miles) west of Portage la Prairie, on Provincial Road 242. It was established as a Canadian Pacific Railroad point in 1881 and named by the Marquis of Lorne, Governor General of Canada, after his aide-de-camp Captain, the Honourable W. R. Bagot, later the fourth Baron of Bagot.
