= Sidney, Manitoba =

Sidney
- Location of Sidney in Manitoba
- Coordinates: 49°54′0″N 99°4′44″W
- Country: Canada
- Province: Manitoba
- Region: Central Plains
- Census Division: No. 8

Government
  - Governing Body: Municipality of North Norfolk
  - MP: Dan Mazier
  - MLA: Jodie Byram
- Time zone: UTC−6 (CST)
  - Summer (DST): UTC−5 (CDT)
- Postal Code: R0H 1L0
- Area codes: 204, 431
- NTS Map: 062G14
- GNBC Code: GAZFC

Sidney is an unincorporated community located in the Municipality of North Norfolk in south central Manitoba, Canada. It is located approximately 57 kilometres (35 miles) west of Portage la Prairie, at the junction of the Trans-Canada Highway (Manitoba Highway 1) and Provincial Road 352.
