= Transport in Winnipeg =

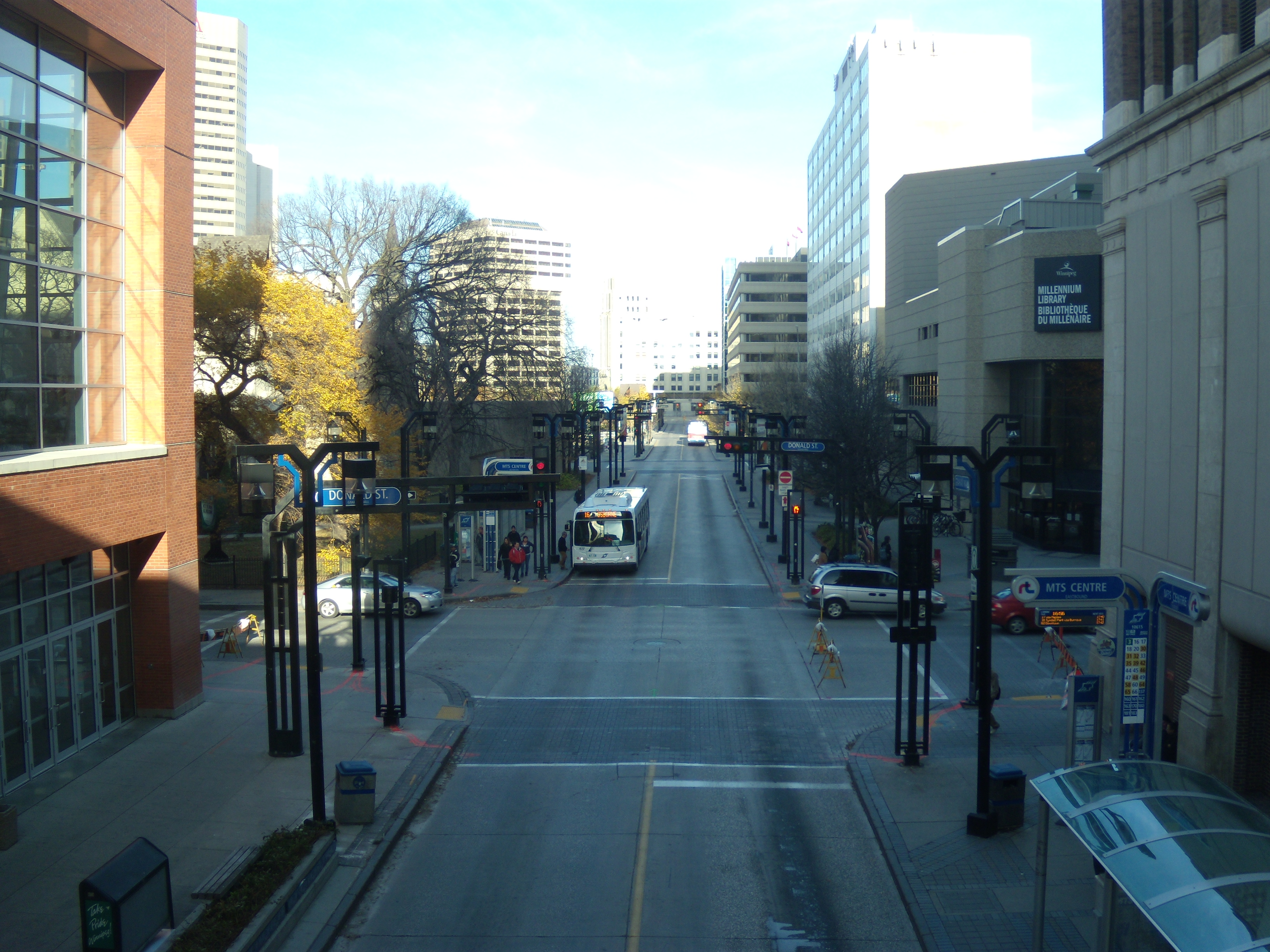
Graham Avenue Transit Mall in Winnipeg.

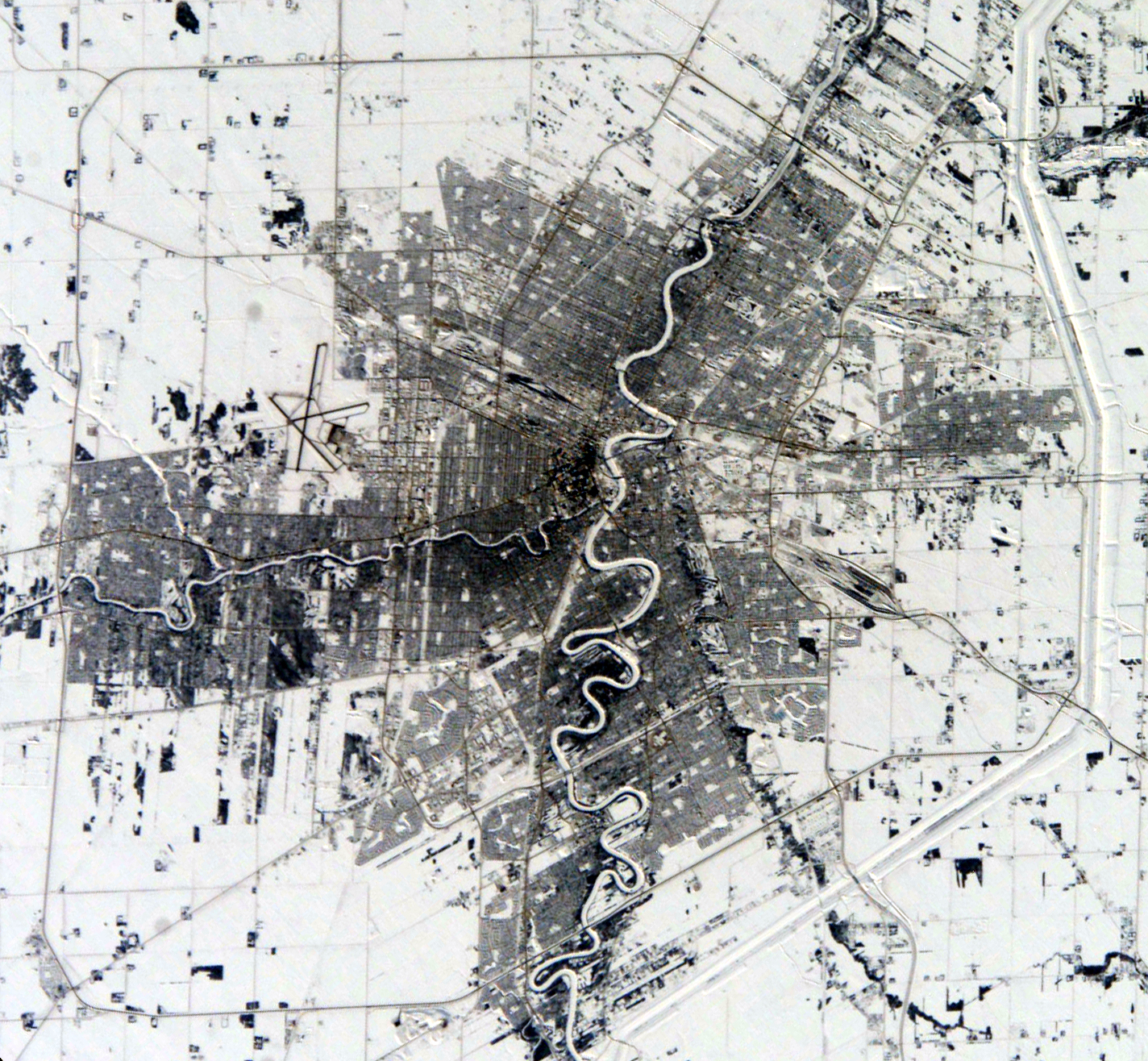
Map of Winnipeg

Transport in Winnipeg involves various transportation systems, including both private and public services, in the capital city of Manitoba.

According to Statistics Canada, in 2011, the dominant form of travel in Winnipeg was by car as a driver (69%), followed by commute trips using public transit (15%), as a car passenger (7%), walking (6%), bicycle (2%), and other modes (1%).

In 2021, the most common mode of transportation in Winnipeg remained driving a car at 73.4%, followed by public transit at 9.3%. 9.2% commuted in a car as passengers, 6.1% commuted by active transportation, and 2% used other methods to get to their destination.

In the province of Manitoba, transportation is the largest contributor to greenhouse gas emissions, representing almost half of the personal emissions for households. As such, the City of Winnipeg government aims for its residents to ultimately adopt sustainable transport methods—i.e., walking, cycling, and public transit—as their preferred choice of transportation.

Transportation structures within the city are the responsibility of the Winnipeg government's Public Works Department. More generally, transportation in Manitoba is regulated by The Driver and Vehicles Act and The Highway Traffic Act. Moreover, insurance is mandatory in the province, and is made available via Manitoba Public Insurance and Autopac brokers.

== Pre-incorporation ==
For thousands of years, the region's Indigenous peoples used various networks of rivers across what is now known as the province of Manitoba.

Situated at the confluence of the Red and the Assiniboine rivers in what is now downtown Winnipeg, The Forks became an early meeting place for the purpose of trade and would prove to be the most important location for European and First Nations trade in Manitoba. The common method of transportation on these waterways during this time were often birch bark canoes generally used by the Indigenous peoples, while European traders would tend to use York boats.

Overland transport in the 19th century was often by ox-drawn Red River cart, which could be built and maintained using only locally obtained material.

Winnipeg was incorporated as a city on 8 November 1873, and has since continued to grow and expand, along with its transportation needs and its inventory of structures.

== Roads and expressways ==
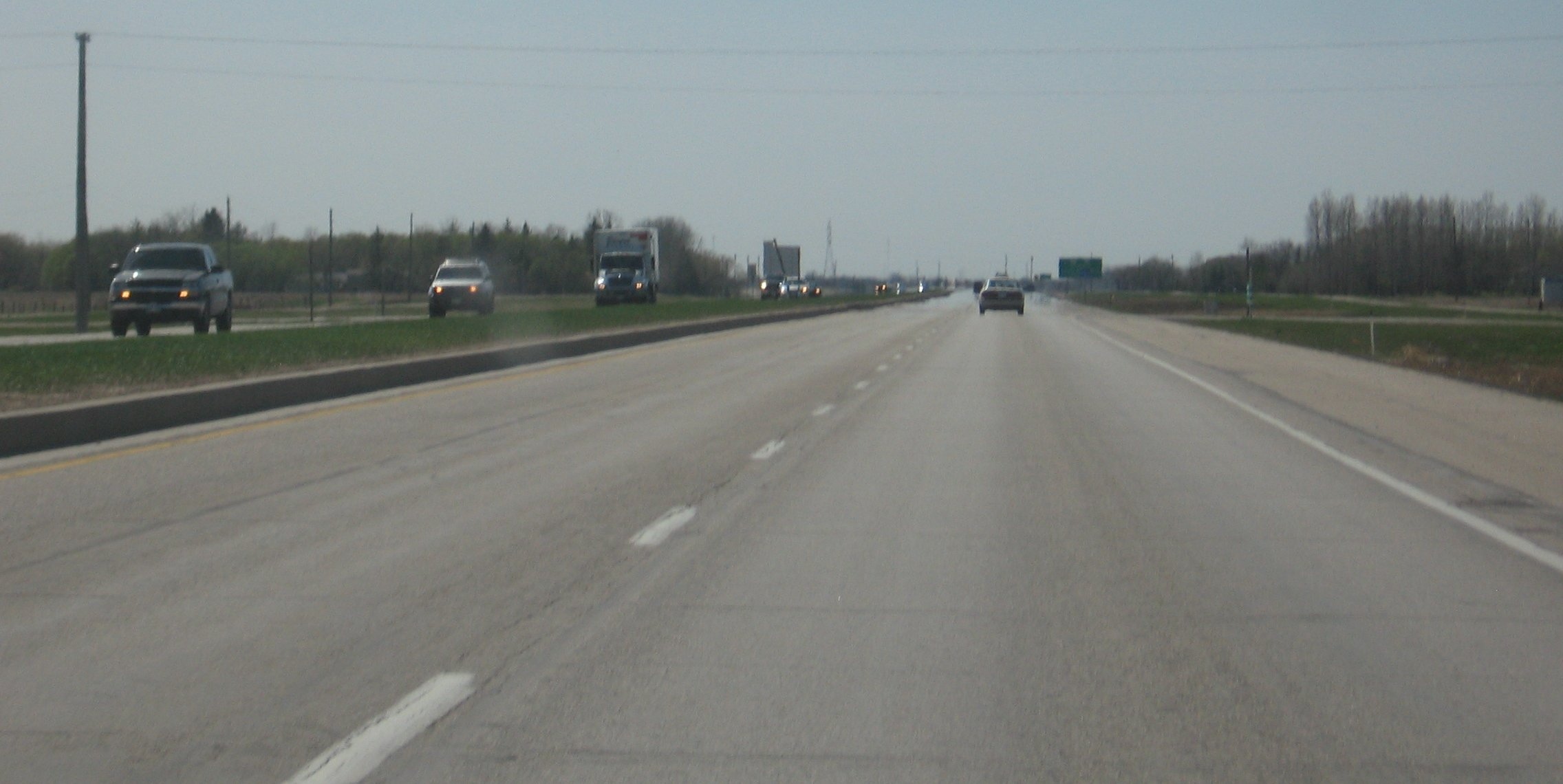
Perimeter Highway, Winnipeg (Manitoba Highway 1)

As the city is situated at the confluence of the Red and the Assiniboine rivers, it was necessary for Winnipeg in its early years to construct various bridges, allowing the city to grow and enabling those on opposite sides of the rivers to be united.

The early growth of Winnipeg saw the need for additional structures to be built; either to either go over (overpasses) or go under (underpasses) railroad tracks and/or roadways. As the street network developed and expanded, the city built various other structures (culverts) in order for the creeks within Winnipeg (e.g. Bunn's Creek, Omand's Creek, Sturgeon Creek, etc.) to flow under the newly constructed streets.

Today, the City of Winnipeg's Public Works Department is responsible for street and sidewalk maintenance and for managing structures within the city.

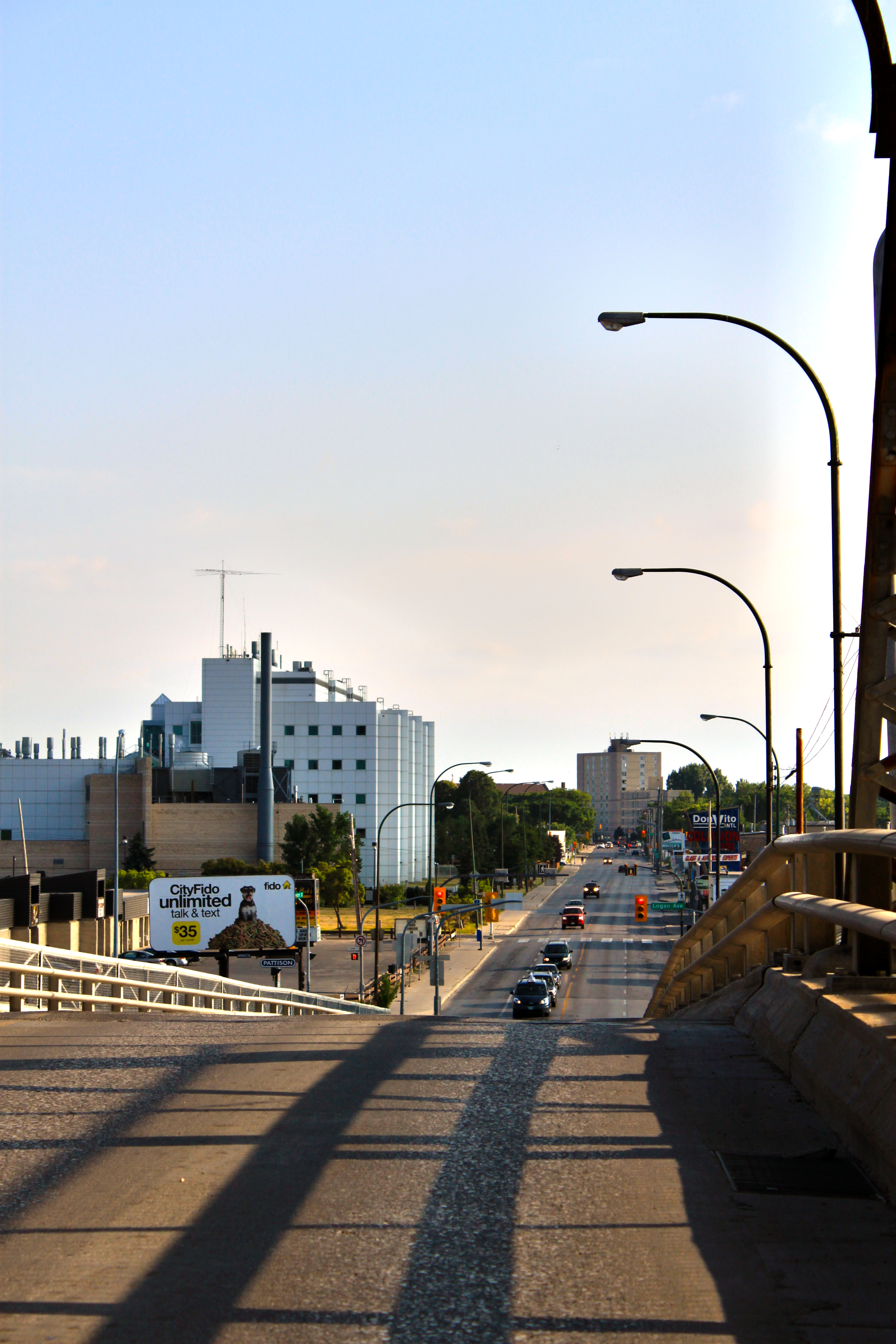
Arlington Street Bridge, indefinitely closed since November 2023 due to structural issues

The Public Works Department's "Streets Program" includes the maintenance of paved and unpaved surfaces, and associated ditches and culverts, alleys, and railway crossings. This maintenance includes patching, restoration, pavement raising, crack sealing, and curb maintenance; as well as grading, dust control, and gravelling.

One noted feature of Winnipeg's urban road network is Confusion Corner, a complex intersection where four arterial roads and a special Winnipeg Transit bus lane are funnelled into a rhomboid-shaped loop of one-way streets at a junction with Osborne Street. Similarly, many downtown streets in Winnipeg are one-way, often making navigation in the area frustrating. Other than downtown and around Polo Park, however, one-way streets in Winnipeg are rare.

On a separate note, photo traffic enforcement in the city may be used in any school zone within Winnipeg, regardless of whether there is a speed reduction.

In 2014, the city presented plans to:

- widen Kenaston Boulevard to six lanes from Ness to Taylor
- widen Marion
- extend Chief Peguis Trail to McPhillips
- widen St Mary's Road at St. Anne's to Marion

As of 2025, Winnipeg City Council has voted in favor of buying properties along Kenaston Boulevard, and the estimated cost of the project is US$757,000,000. The other projects remain unfunded or were abandoned. However, the city did allocate US$156,800,000 to renew 175 kilometres of roads, 50 sidewalk locations, and 15 kilometres of bike lanes.

=== Vehicle bridges ===
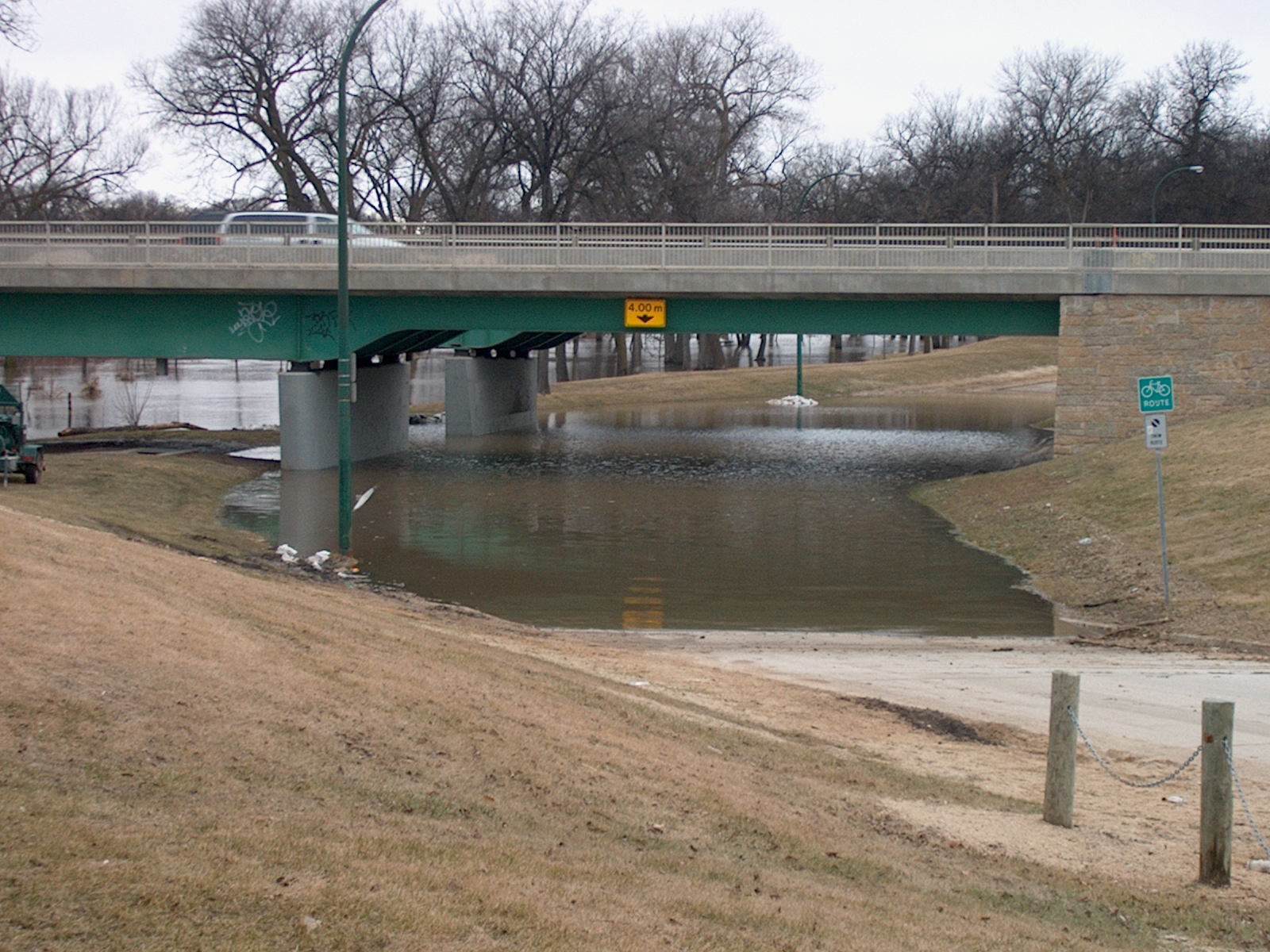
St. Vital Bridge underpass during the 2009 flood.

The Department's Bridge Operations Branch is responsible for the "inspection, maintenance, rehabilitation, and construction of all bridges; overpasses; underpasses, major culverts; overhead traffic sign support structures, roadside safety installations, and related structures" in Winnipeg. As of January 2020, the Branch is responsible for the maintenance of the following structures:

- 47 vehicular bridges over water
- 13 vehicular bridge overpasses
- 54 pedestrian bridges
- 70 major culverts
- 47 vehicular bridges over water
- 13 vehicular bridge overpasses
- 54 pedestrian bridges
- 22 railway underpasses
- 1 roadway underpass
- 5 pedestrian underpasses
- 70 major culverts
- 231 overhead sign structures
- 73 roadside safety crash reduction devices
- 340 roadside safety guardrail installations
- 5 noise reduction barriers
- 4 slope stability structures

For new bridge construction in Winnipeg today, standard cross-sections with "roadside safety features" have been developed—significant, recent examples include the Provencher Bridge, the Norwood Bridge, and the Maryland Twin Bridges. Now, when a structure in Winnipeg is scheduled for major rehabilitation, the standard cross-section is incorporated into the design.

The Disraeli Bridges, part of the Disraeli Freeway on Winnipeg Route 42, stretch over the Red River, going from Main Street to Henderson Highway, and are integral in connecting the city's downtown and northeastern areas. Originally constructed in 1959–60 and named after Benjamin Disraeli, the Bridges were authorized for rehabilitation in 2008, and subsequently became Winnipeg's largest bridge project in history (current as of 2020).

=== Highways ===
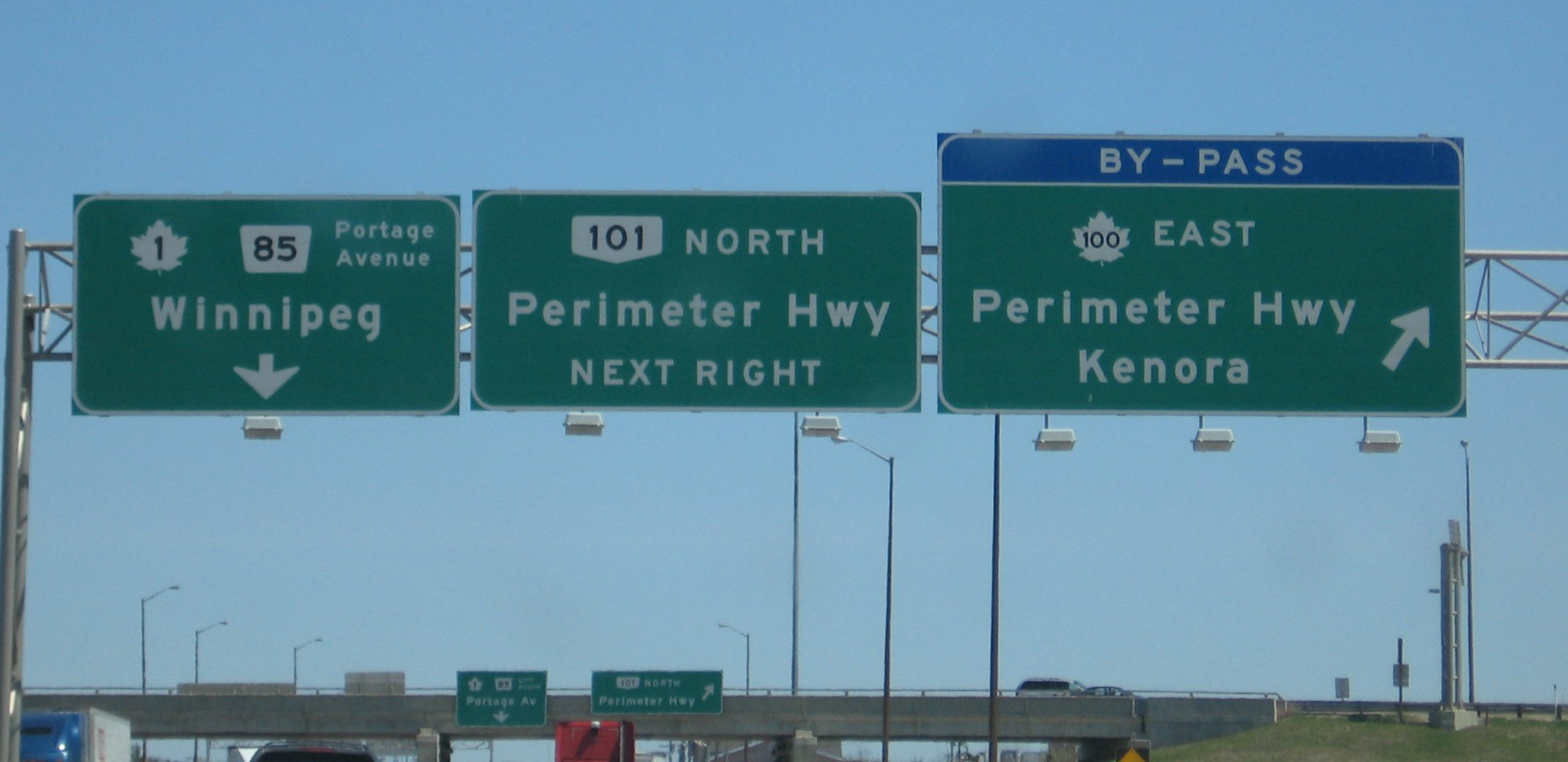
Trans-Canada Highway Bypass (Perimeter Highway) sign in western Winnipeg

Winnipeg is unique among cities its size in that it does not have freeways within the urban area.

Beginning in 1958, the primarily suburban Metropolitan council proposed a system of freeways, including one that would have bisected the downtown area. The plan culminated in the monumental "Winnipeg Area Transportation Study" (WATS) of 1968. The extensive freeway plan faced stiff community opposition and was deemed over-ambitious. It was not implemented as a concerted undertaking, but construction of major traffic corridors follows the study to this day, including expressways such as Route 165/Abinojii Mikanah, although most are in the form of urban arterial roads, and no freeways are likely to be constructed within the urban area any time soon. However, a one-mile stretch of freeway was built in the late 1950s, called the Disraeli Freeway (part of the Disraeli Bridge project), which is part of Route 42.

Winnipeg is one of the first Canadian cities of its size to have a ring road (the Perimeter Highway) which provides a by-pass for travellers on the Trans-Canada Highway. Within the city, the Trans-Canada Highway follows regular city streets.

The Perimeter Highway is a four-lane highway that bypasses the city entirely—as it is located around the city (i.e. a ring road), mostly as an expressway with interchanges and at-grade intersections—allowing travellers on the Trans-Canada Highway to avoid the city and continue east or west. The Perimeter Highway was chosen over the freeways that would have been in the city. Now, the city has planned to create an Inner Perimeter Highway with Route 17, Route 90, Route 165, and Route 20.

Many Manitoba provincial highways enter Winnipeg, but the majority lose their highway designation and become Winnipeg Routes once they reach the Perimeter Highway. At present, only two provincial highways pass entirely through the Winnipeg area:

- Highway 1; and
- Highway 59 (which is a northern continuation of US 59) and is also designated as Route 20 (i.e., Lagimodière Boulevard) in Winnipeg.

Several highways also converge on Winnipeg without passing entirely through the city. These include:

- Highway 2, which meets with Hwy 3 at the southwest Perimeter;
- Highway 3, which becomes Route 155 (i.e., McGillivray Boulevard) in Winnipeg;
- Highway 6, which is the main highway to northern Manitoba;
- Highway 7, which becomes Route 90 (known through various street names) in Winnipeg;
- Highway 8, which becomes Route 180 (i.e., McPhillips Street) in Winnipeg;
- Highway 9, which becomes Route 52 (i.e., Main Street) in Winnipeg;
- Highway 15, which becomes Route 115 (i.e., Dugald Road) in Winnipeg; and
- Highway 75 (a northern continuation of I-29 and US 75), which becomes Route 42 (i.e., Pembina Hwy) in Winnipeg. This road is an exception to the rule that only two provincial highways penetrate the Perimeter Highway, as Highway 75 actually continues until the intersection with Bison Drive / Chancellor Matheson Road (which leads to the University of Manitoba's Fort Garry).

On 14 April 2009, Prime Minister Stephen Harper with Manitoba Premier Gary Doer announced at James Richardson that both the federal and provincial governments would contribute CA$212.5 million towards a divided four-lane expressway called CentrePort Canada Way. Created as a hub for national and international trading corridors, as well as to attract new transportation logistics development to the city area, CentrePort Canada Way has since been completed and links Inkster Boulevard to the Perimeter Highway. The expressway allows for 5 minutes to 88 km/h (55 mph).

== Public transit ==
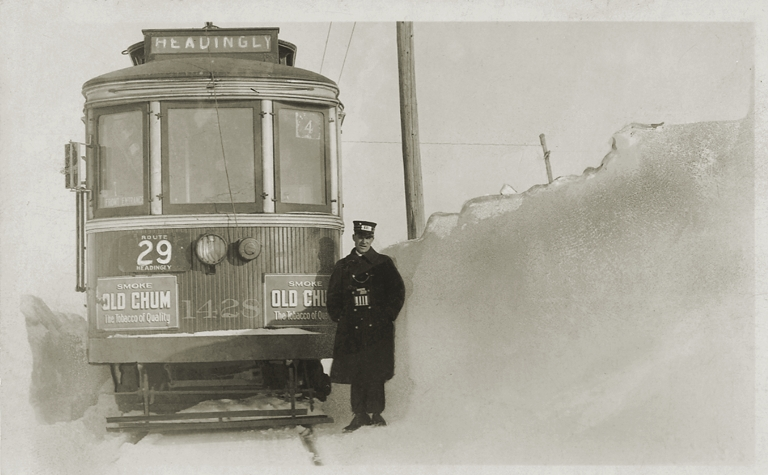
Suburban Rapid Transit Co. interurban in Headingley, Manitoba. (Note the misspelling on the train.)

Winnipeg has had a public transit system since the 1880s, starting with horse-drawn streetcars, then electric streetcars from 1891 until 1955, and electric trolley buses from 1938 until 1970.

The current local public transit system in the city is provided by Winnipeg Transit, which now operates entirely with diesel buses. In 2021, public transit was the form of travel for 9.3% of commuters in Winnipeg, down from 15% in 2011. The City of Winnipeg government aims for its residents to ultimately adopt public transit and other methods of sustainable transport as their preferred choice of transportation.

Winnipeg is home to many large transit bus manufacturers, including New Flyer Industries and Motor Coach Industries. The former supplies transit buses for many major North American cities including New York City and Vancouver, British Columbia.

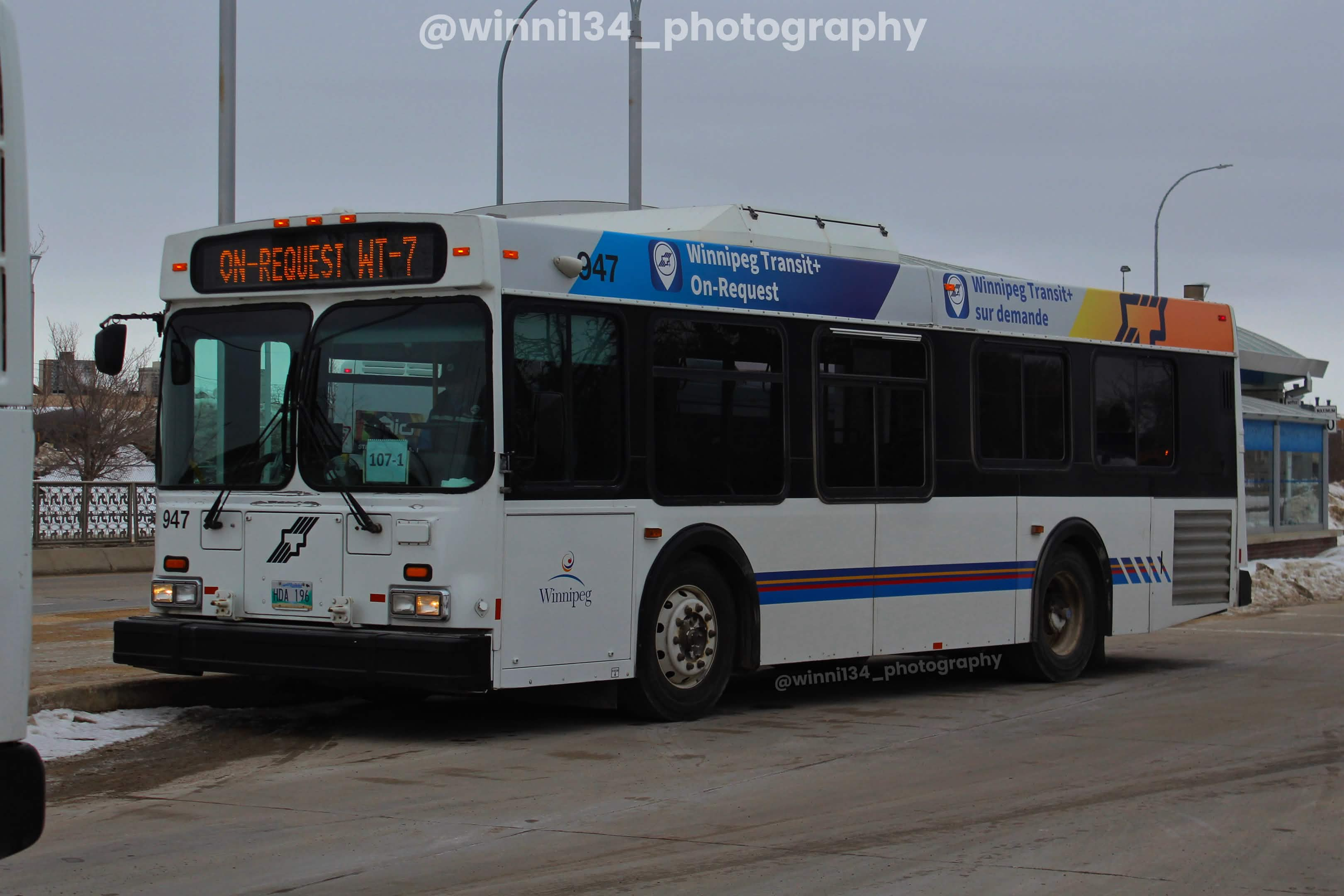
Winnipeg Transit 947 on the 107 On-Request Service at Fort Rouge Station, as WT-7

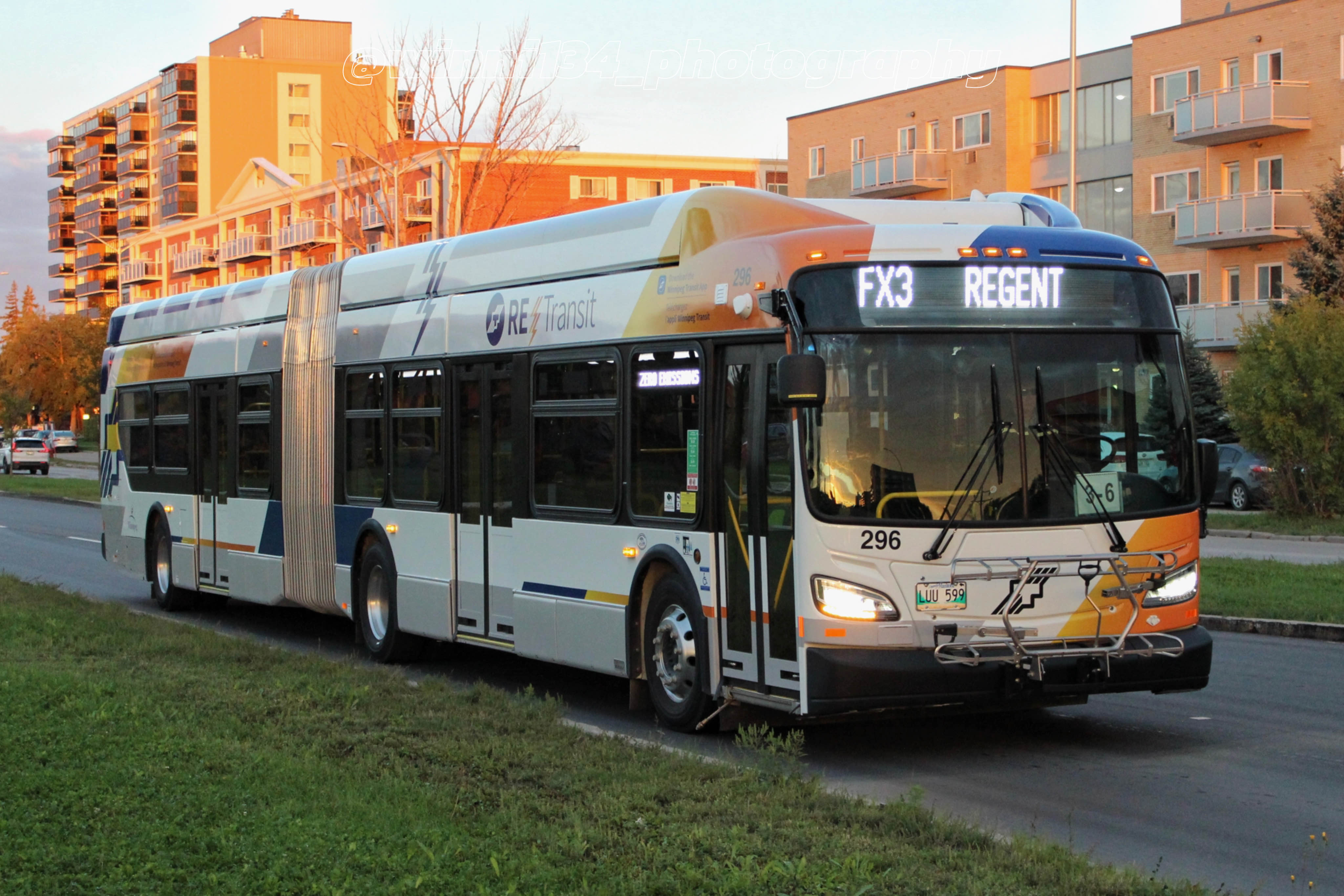
Winnipeg Transit 296 on route FX3. This bus was the first electric articulated bus in Winnipeg, and in Canada

=== Winnipeg Transit ===
Local public transit in Winnipeg is primarily provided by Winnipeg Transit with a fleet of over 600 low-floor easy-access buses. Winnipeg Transit has 72 bus routes and 12 On-Request zones since the introduction of the Primary Transit Network on June 29, 2025. They are classified into the following:

Primary Transit Network (frequent and direct service with stops spaced further apart):

- 1 Rapid Transit route
- 3 Frequent Express (FX) routes
- 5 Frequent (F) routes
- 10 Direct (D) routes

Feeder Network (community routes and service connecting to the Primary Transit Network):

- 10 Connector routes
- 30 Community routes
- 13 Limited Span routes
- 12 On-Request zones

In 2006, the city government began a multi-year comprehensive transit improvement program that involved:

- "An accelerated program of fleet replacements with low-floor accessible buses;"
- "The implementation of upgrades to major stops and terminals;"
- "On-street transit priority measures (i.e. diamond lanes, queue jump lanes, priority signals);"
- "Implementation of leading-edge Intelligent Transportation System technologies on buses to facilitate real-time updates on route schedules;"
- "Establishing a variety of new park-and-ride facilities;" and
- Outfitting Winnipeg Transit's "entire fleet with a GPS-based Automatic Vehicle Location system."

In 2025, Winnipeg Transit started to introduce zero-emission buses (ZEB) in service. Winnipeg became the first Canadian city to operate a 60-foot battery-electric bus in August and a 60-foot hydrogen fuel cell bus in December. Winnipeg Transit also began operation of 40-foot battery-electric buses in September and 40-foot hydrogen fuel cell buses in December.

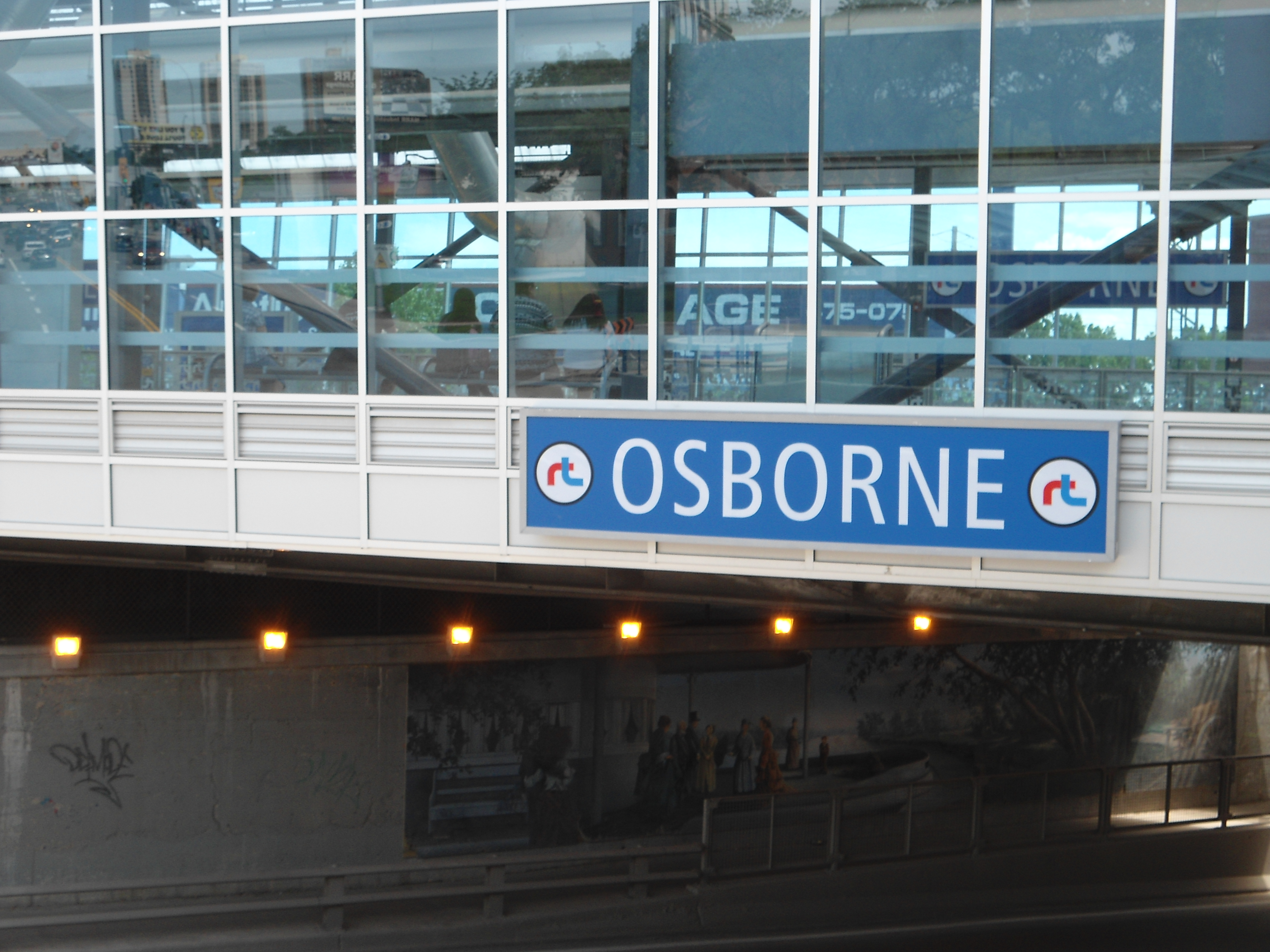
Osborne Station on the Southwest Transitway opened in April 2012. Commuters can be seen through the glass, and a mural can be seen on the side of the underpass.

==== Rapid transit ====
As of 2026, Winnipeg Rapid Transit consists of the Southwest Transitway, a 11-kilometre bus transitway between Harkness Station and Markham Station with a branch to the University of Manitoba. Route BLUE operates along its entirety while several other routes use a portion of its length.

For decades, the city has explored the idea of a rapid transit link, either bus or rail, from downtown to the University of Manitoba's suburban campus. The most recent proposal in the 2000s called for several enhanced bus routes, which would extend across the city. These routes would use bus-only lanes for most of their length, with separate busways being built around congested sections.

There are plans to add additional transit corridors, each connecting various areas in Winnipeg to downtown. These include: Eastern Transitway (downtown to Transcona), West Transitway (downtown to St. James and the Winnipeg Airport), and North Transitway (downtown to West Kildonan).

=== Intercity bus ===
Ontario Northland, Rider Express, and Kasper provide service from Winnipeg to Regina, Thunder Bay, The Pas, Thompon, and several towns along the routes. Brandon Air Shuttle operates between Winnipeg and Brandon with a focus on serving Winnipeg International Airport.

The Winnipeg Bus Terminal was located at the Winnipeg James Armstrong Richardson International Airport. Beaver Bus Lines' commuter service between Selkirk and Winnipeg ended on 30 June 2016, after 68 years in service (1948–2016). Thereafter, two succeeding companies—Exclusive Bus Lines and Kasper Transportation—tried unsuccessfully to keep Winnipeg–Selkirk service running.

Since 31 October 2018, Greyhound Canada no longer serves the Canadian Prairies.

=== Pedestrians and cycling ===
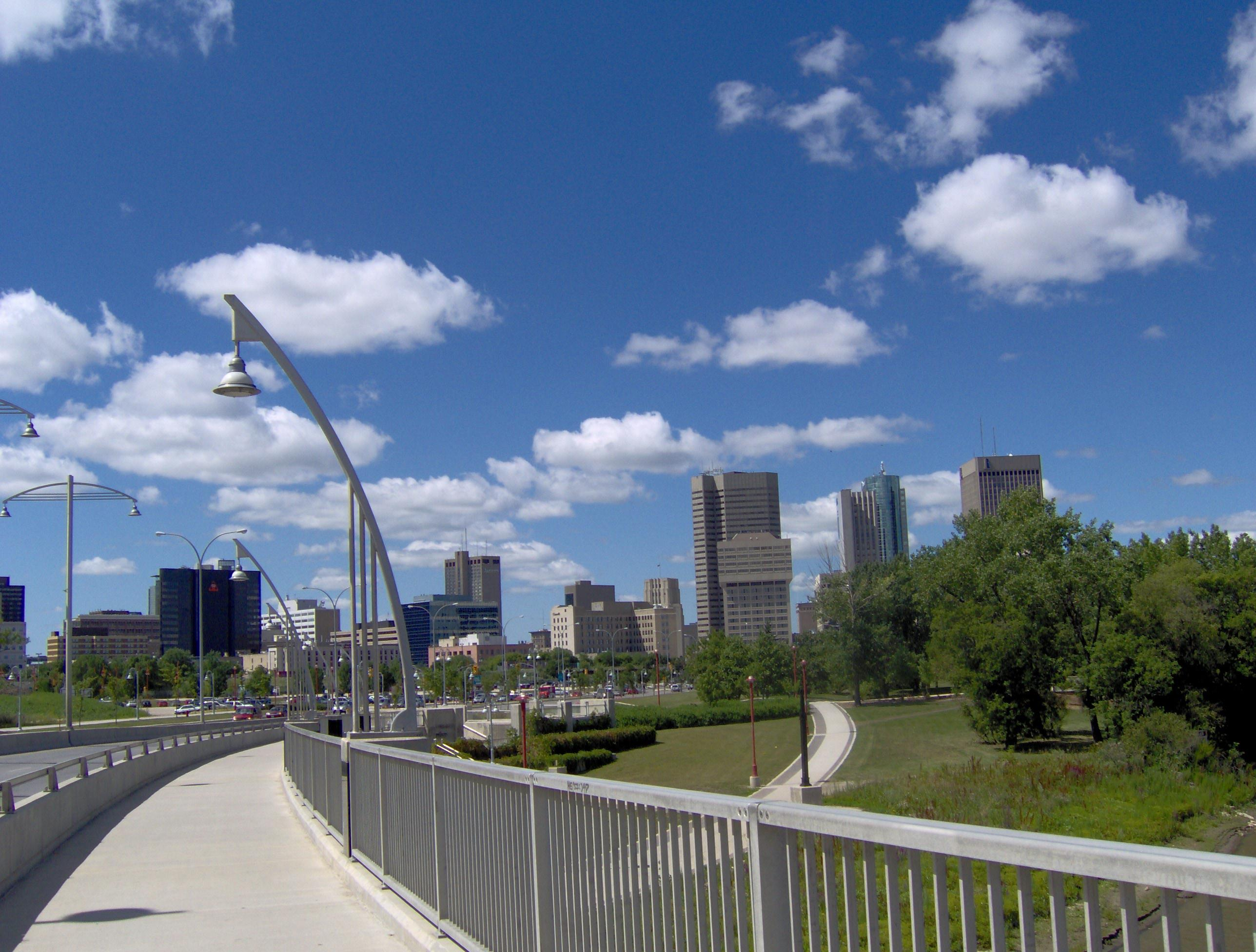
Walkway in Downtown Winnipeg from Esplanade Riel.

Every year, the Winnipeg government dedicates funds to improve, upgrade, and expand upon the city's pedestrian and cycling networks. Moreover, the Public Works Department of the City of Winnipeg recommends an annual list of projects in the Pedestrian and Cycling Action Plan. Before going to the City Council for final approval, the adoption of annual pedestrian and cycling projects requires approval from the Standing Policy Committee on Infrastructure Renewal and Public Works.

Driving through certain corridors in Winnipeg, one may come across dedicated pedestrian and cyclist traffic signals in addition to typical traffic lights (i.e., through-traffic and left-turning). The city also has a number of multi-use paths, which are paved or unpaved routes shared by both pedestrians and cyclists and are physically separated from motor vehicles.

Ultimately, pedestrians have the right of way over traffic in Winnipeg, just as elsewhere; both drivers and cyclists must yield to them when crossing the road, a bike lane, etc., and cyclists must yield to them on shared paths.

=== Cycling ===
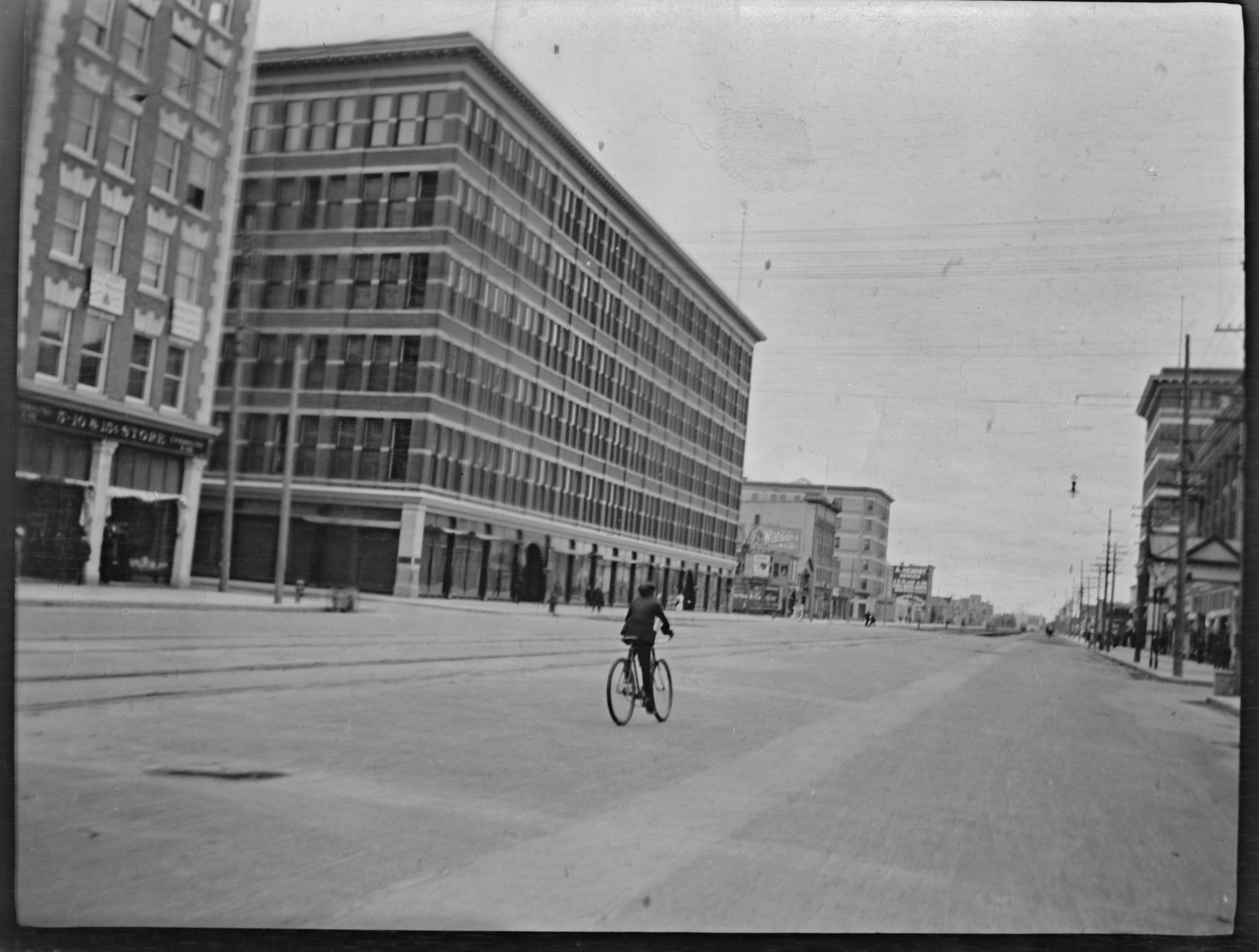
Biker in front of Eaton's Place in Winnipeg (1907)

In 2019, the City of Winnipeg rolled out new bike infrastructure throughout the city, including sharrows, on-street and off-street bike lanes, and cycling priority traffic signals. Winnipeg was one of the first cities in Canada to pilot the bicycle layer on Google Maps.

Protected bike lanes are located within the road right-of-way, but are physically separated from motor-vehicle lanes by concrete curbs, planters, vehicle parking, etc. Some protected lanes allow for only one-way bicycle traffic, while others accommodate travel in both directions. (The direction of these lanes are irrespective of the direction of regular traffic. For example, a two-way street can have a one-way bike lane.) Similarly, contraflow bike lanes allow cyclists to travel in the opposite direction of motor vehicle traffic, either on one-way streets or on the opposite side of the road. These lanes can be protected or painted, but are always separated with a yellow line to signify the opposing direction of travel.

Some bikeways have dedicated bike signals, providing greater visibility for cyclists. Most of these signals will grant cyclists a few seconds of lead time over vehicle signals in order to allow a head start. In addition to regular bike lanes, the city has also introduced 'floating' travel lanes at transit stops, which allow a protected space for cyclists to bypass buses/passengers while they load and unload.

Cyclists in Winnipeg are also able to take their bikes in Winnipeg Transit buses using free racks installed on the front of select buses (2 bikes per bus), in all seasons but winter.

==== Campaigns and initiatives ====
The City of Winnipeg publishes an annual cycling map, typically available in public libraries, bike retailers, hotels, and other tourist hotspots, as well as online. The map is developed in partnership with Bike Winnipeg, Winnipeg Trails Association, Manitoba Cycling Association, Climate Change Connection, Green Action Centre, Physical Activity Coalition of Manitoba, and Winnipeg in motion.

Bike Winnipeg is a non-profit organization, working as an inclusive group of people and organizations, that helps and advocates for cycling as a year-round mode of transportation in Winnipeg. The organization came as result of a forum organized by a group of cyclists and held at the University of Winnipeg on 20 September 2006. More than 100 cyclists attended the event to discuss the development of cycling in Winnipeg, and Bike Winnipeg was officially incorporated as an NPO in February 2007 (as Bike to the Future). The organization decided to change their name in April 2013.

Bike Week Winnipeg is a weeklong celebration of events aimed at encouraging Winnipeg residents to ride their bikes. It originally began as Bike to Work Day, but has since turned into a weeklong event.

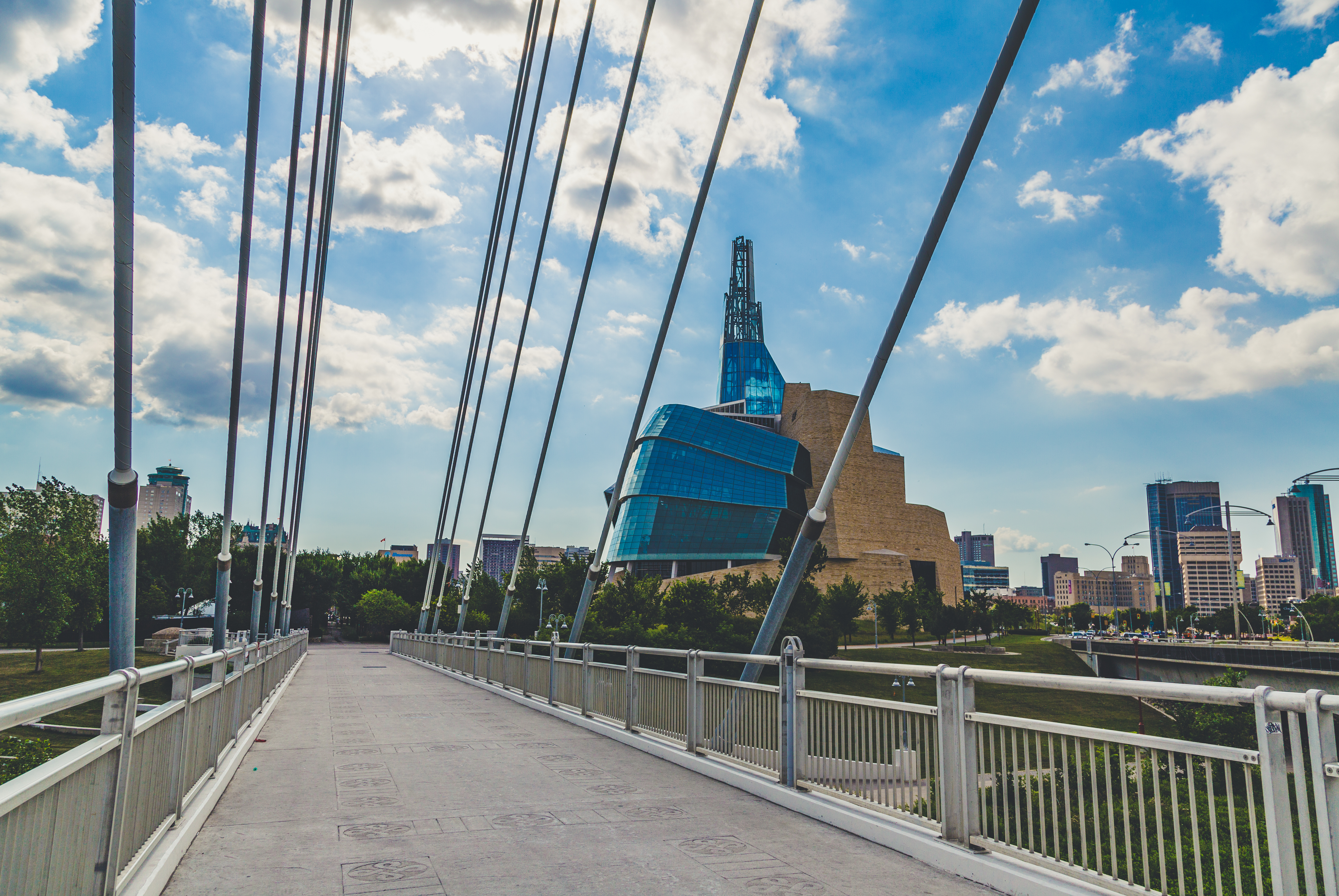
Esplanade Riel pedestrian bridge

=== Pedestrians ===
As of January 2020, the Public Works Department's Bridge Operations Branch is responsible for the maintenance of 54 pedestrian bridges and 5 pedestrian underpasses. Ultimately, pedestrians have the right of way over traffic in Winnipeg, just as elsewhere; both drivers and cyclists must yield to them when crossing the road, a bike lane, etc., and cyclists must yield to them on shared paths.

The Winnipeg Skywalk is a pedestrian network of 14 skyways and 7 tunnels connecting a significant portion of downtown Winnipeg. The Skywalk is joined by all of the buildings around Portage & Main, including Winnipeg Square, Cityplace, Portage Place, the Millennium Library, and the Canada Life Centre. Connecting 38 buildings in total, the Skywalk allows for a maximum walk of 2 kilometres (1.2 mi).

== Airports ==
Winnipeg is currently served by the Winnipeg James Armstrong Richardson International Airport (IATA: YWG, ICAO: CYWG), which was redeveloped with a new passenger terminal completed in 2010. The old terminal was constructed in the early 1960s, is demolished.

The airport is operational 24 hours per day, handling about 3.5 million passengers annually, and is part of the national airports system of Canada. From 1937 to 1949, the airport was the headquarters and site of the national maintenance base of Air Canada, which has since moved to Montreal-Dorval.

The freight terminal of the Winnipeg International is part of the CentrePort Canada dry port, offering 24/7 worldwide air cargo operations. Major carriers on site include Air Canada Cargo, Canada Post, Cargojet, FedEx, Purolator, and UPS. YWG is ranked #1 in all of Canada for "dedicated freighter aircraft movements" and, as such, it is the only international airport between Toronto and Calgary capable of handling large freighter aircraft.

== Railways ==
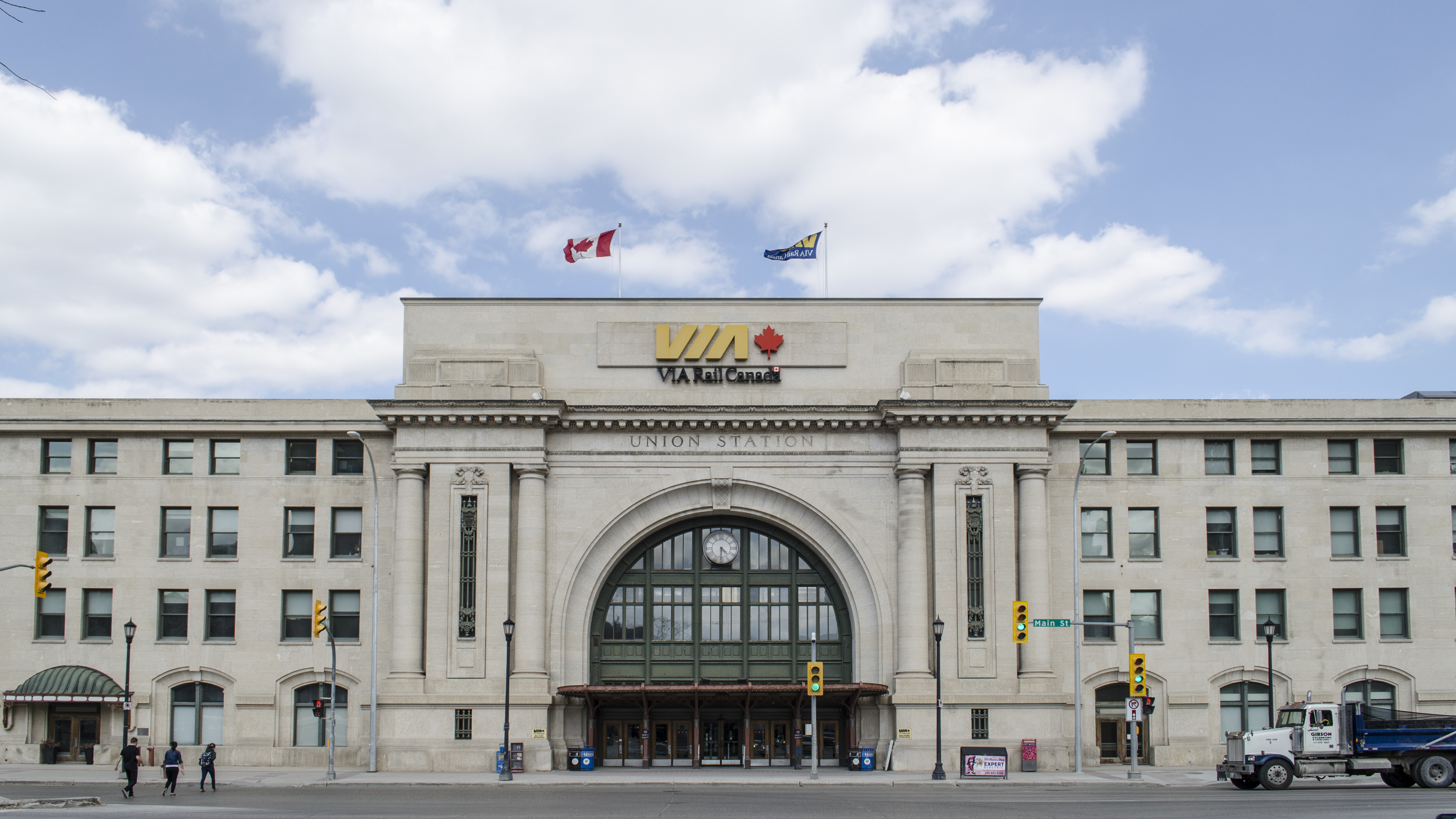
Union Station, Winnipeg

Union Station is the inter-city railway station for Winnipeg, situated downtown near The Forks. Via Rail provides service along the Winnipeg-Churchill line and on The Canadian from Vancouver to Toronto. The station building is a beaux-arts structure built by the Canadian Northern Railway, National Transcontinental, and Grand Trunk Pacific railways and the Dominion government and designed by the same architects as Grand Central Terminal in New York City. It is a National Historic Site.

There are approximately 5,000 people employed in Winnipeg in the rail transportation industry.

Winnipeg is the only city between Vancouver and Thunder Bay with direct US connections, it is the only major Canadian city on the prairies served by 3 continental class I railways: Canadian National Railway (CNR), Canadian Pacific Railway (CPR), and BNSF. The city is also currently served by Via Rail and the Central Manitoba Railway (CEMR).

The CPR and the CNR were especially instrumental railroads in the early development of Winnipeg as a city. They now operate large rail yards, customer service operations, and intermodal facilities inside Winnipeg. In particular, Symington Yard is the largest of CNR's rail classification yards in Canada, one of 20 intermodal facilities and one of the largest rail yards in the world.

As of February 2021, CentrePort Canada is in the middle of developing its "Rail Park" on 665 acres (2.69 km^{2}) of land, providing colocation services for rail-oriented companies.

In addition to the major commercial railways, the City of Winnipeg owns and operates the Greater Winnipeg Water District Railway, which runs parallel to the city aqueduct to Shoal Lake.

== Taxi and car-sharing services ==
=== Taxi services ===
Winnipeg is served by several taxi companies, the three largest (in order of size) being Unicity, Duffy's, and Spring Taxi.

Fifty percent of Winnipeg residents can be expected to use a taxi at least once during the year. Both Unicity and Duffy's Taxi are cooperatives (co-ops), wherein the individual drivers of participating co-ops own their own license and supply their own vehicle; Spring Taxi, in contrast, owns a significant portion of its taxi fleet.

Unicity is a cooperative that collectively owns the assets of the Unicity dispatch or taxi call center, and it is the largest taxi operation in Winnipeg. Unicity Taxi was formed by three smaller companies in the mid-1970s—Moore's, Grosvenor and Yellow Taxi. The company has subsequently brought many smaller independent companies into its fleet and now offers 165 cars as well as an ultra-modern dispatching (DDS Pathfinder) and accounting (taxicharger) systems to serve its customers.

Duffy's Taxi is a cooperative taxi firm that operates 154 vehicles, with a large call center that accepts approximately 2,800 calls per day. The organization was formed in the 1950s as an amalgamation of the original and much smaller Duffy's Taxi with Vets Nash Taxi, which was a cooperative of war veterans.

Spring Taxi is the newest and smallest centrally dispatched taxi company in Winnipeg. Spring Taxi owns 16 of the 32 vehicles that run under the company, with the remaining 16 being owner-operated.

Other taxi services in Winnipeg include Blueline Taxi and Dignity Taxi. Limousine services include Ambassador Limos, Executive Limos, Five Star Limos, Friendly Limos, Hollywood Limos, London Limos, Tony's Team Transport, and Winnipeg Limos.

==== Splash Dash water services ====
Splash Dash is a water taxi shuttle service, created in the summer of 1992 after the Forks opened, that runs between various downtown areas. This is still the most western of the terminals for the River Spirit Water Bus Service, as it is officially known.

Initial fares were $2 for a "dock to dock return ticket" or $5 for a day pass. Three pontoon boats were utilized to transport passengers along the rivers. Service hours were from 11am till 8pm with 30 minute headways most of the day except during the lunch hour where headways were 20 minutes. In the early 2000s, Hugo Dock was added. As of 2012, the current one-way fare is $3.50, and an unlimited day-pass is $15.00.

Splash Dash has struggled to operate since opening, due to the problem of high water on both the Red and Assiniboine Rivers during most years. After the ice melts in spring, it may take several weeks, sometimes until late June or early July, for the waters of the two rivers to recede enough to allow the installation of the fixed and floating portions of the docks in use. Expansion plans had earlier called for the Splash Dash to run as far west as the Sherbrook-Maryland Bridge by 2007.

=== Carsharing and carpooling ===
Ride-sharing services in the city include ReRyde, Uber, and Lyft.

GoManitoba is a province-wide website that helps to facilitate carpools and promote the use of public transit. The platform allows individuals to choose to commute either with others from their workplace or campus, or with those who are travelling on the same route as them.

The Peg City Car Co-op is a carsharing cooperative that includes 130 vehicles and over 3600 members. It was officially launched by a group of five volunteers on 24 June 2011 with just three vehicles. The cooperative claims that every car in its fleet represents 13 to 15 cars taken off the road. In 2023, the co-op announced they will be adding 35 additional vehicles and launch free-floating car sharing in Winnipeg.

== Sustainability ==
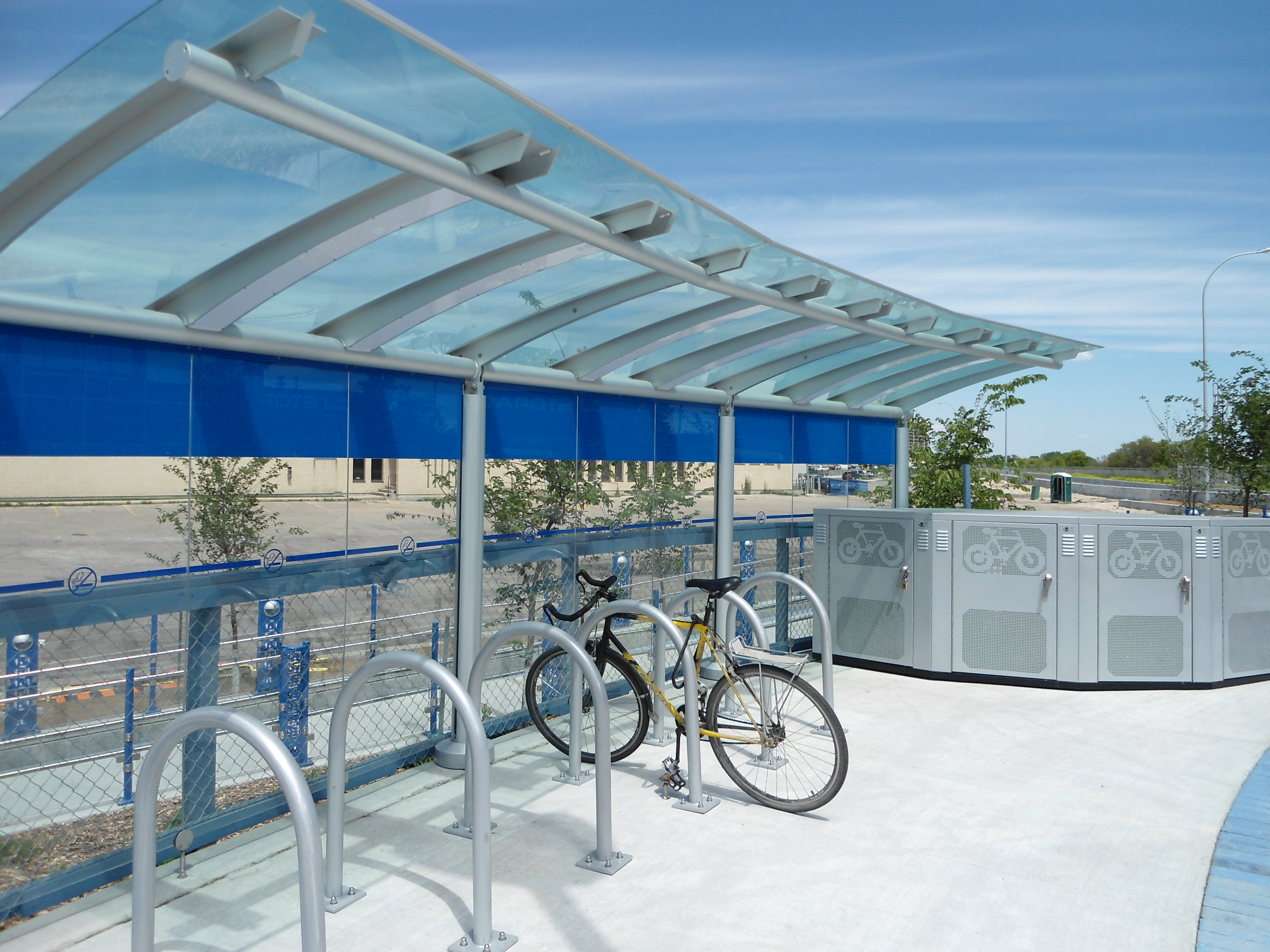
Bike racks with shelter and bike lockers, at Osborne Station on the Winnipeg Rapid Transit system.

In the province of Manitoba, transportation is the largest contributor to greenhouse gas emissions, representing almost half of the personal emissions for households. As such, the City of Winnipeg government aims for its residents to ultimately adopt sustainable transport methods—i.e., walking, cycling, and public transit—as their preferred choice of transportation.

The Winnipeg Trails Association develops sustainability in Winnipeg primarily through active transportation. Main activities of the WTA related to transportation include: academic research and data collection; infrastructure usage audits; project management and implementation; transportation infrastructure design; and policy development, among others. Founded in 2003 and incorporated as a non-profit in 2017, the WTA says that its biggest priority for the past 5 years has been to "accelerate trail development" into downtown Winnipeg; to incorporate "sustainable transportation in long term planning, including inevitable connections along major commercial corridors;" and to fix the considerable "lack of recreational and transportation options in Winnipeg's Northwest quadrant."

The city has announced plans to connect Active Transportation missing links, with a bridge across the rail yards between Arlington and Salter, and a bridge across the Red River at Matheson.

=== Park & Ride ===
Winnipeg Transit provides 11 park-and-ride lots available Monday to Friday from 6am to 6pm (except Seel Station and Clarence Station which are available whenever transit operates).

Winnipeg Transit Park & Ride stations
Location	Parking stalls	Transit routes	Features				
Location	Parking stalls	Transit routes	Shelters	Electronic display	Stop schedule timetables	Posted route and schedule info	Other
Charleswood Centre	25–30	FX3 (frequent service to Downtown), 885, On-Request	1 heated	BUSwatch	yes		
Clarence Station	400	BLUE (frequent service to Downtown and University of Manitoba), 690, 691, On-Request	1 heated	Digital			Bike Lockers
Club Regent Casino	70	FX3 (frequent service to Downtown)	1 heated	BUSwatch			
Garden City	30	FX2 (frequent service to Downtown), F5, D10, 28, 28, 330, 332, 334, 336, On-Request	2 heated 1 unheated	BUSwatch		yes	
Grant & Cambridge	17	FX3 (frequent service to Downtown), 28, 680	1 heated 1 unheated	BUSwatch		yes	
Kildonan Place	69	FX3 (frequent service to Downtown), F9, D10, D17, 38, 48, 440, 442, 444, 446, On-Request	3 heated	BUSwatch		yes	
McPhillips Station	temporarily discontinued						
Safeway on Pembina		F8 (frequent service to Downtown and University of Manitoba), 678	2 unheated		yes		
Seel Station	665	BLUE (frequent service to Downtown and University of Manitoba), 28, 642, 649, 650, 679, 680, 690, 691, 694, On-Request	1 heated	Digital			
Southdale Centre	14	F9, D15, 551, 557, 558, On-Request	1 heated 1 unheated		yes		
Vista Place	15	558, 676, On-Request	1 heated		yes		

== See also ==
- Transportation in Canada
- Red River cart
- York boat
- Alpha (sternwheeler)
