= Division No. 8, Manitoba =

Census division in Canada

Coordinates: 50°05′10″N 98°54′15″W

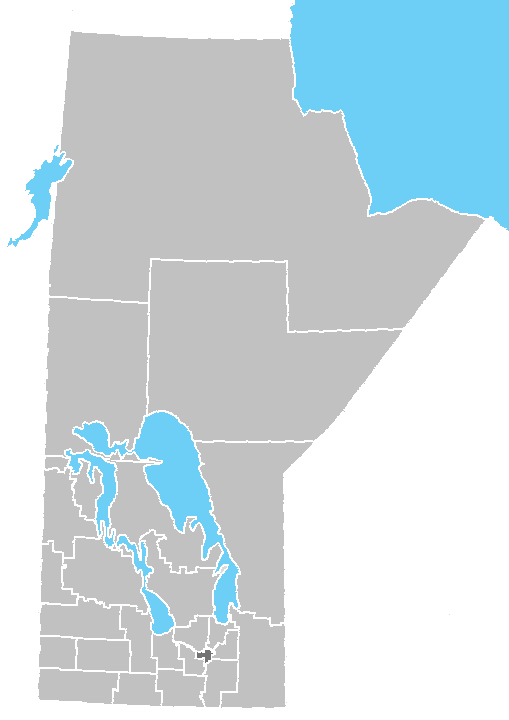

Census Division No. 8 (Central Manitoba) is a census division located within the Central Plains Region of the Province of Manitoba, Canada. Unlike in some other provinces, census divisions do not reflect the organization of local government in Manitoba. These areas exist solely for the purposes of statistical analysis and presentation; they have no government of their own.

The economics of the area is based on agriculture, livestock and commercial fish on Lake Manitoba. The population of the area as of 2016 was 13,968. Also included in the division is the Sandy Bay First Nation and the southernmost part of the Long Plain First Nation.

== Demographics ==
In the 2021 Census of Population conducted by Statistics Canada, Division No. 8 had a population of 13,877 living in 4,453 of its 4,827 total private dwellings, a change of −0.7% from its 2016 population of 13,968. With a land area of 5,843.87 km^{2} (2,256.33 sq mi), it had a population density of 2.4/km^{2} (6.2/sq mi) in 2021.

== Unincorporated communities ==
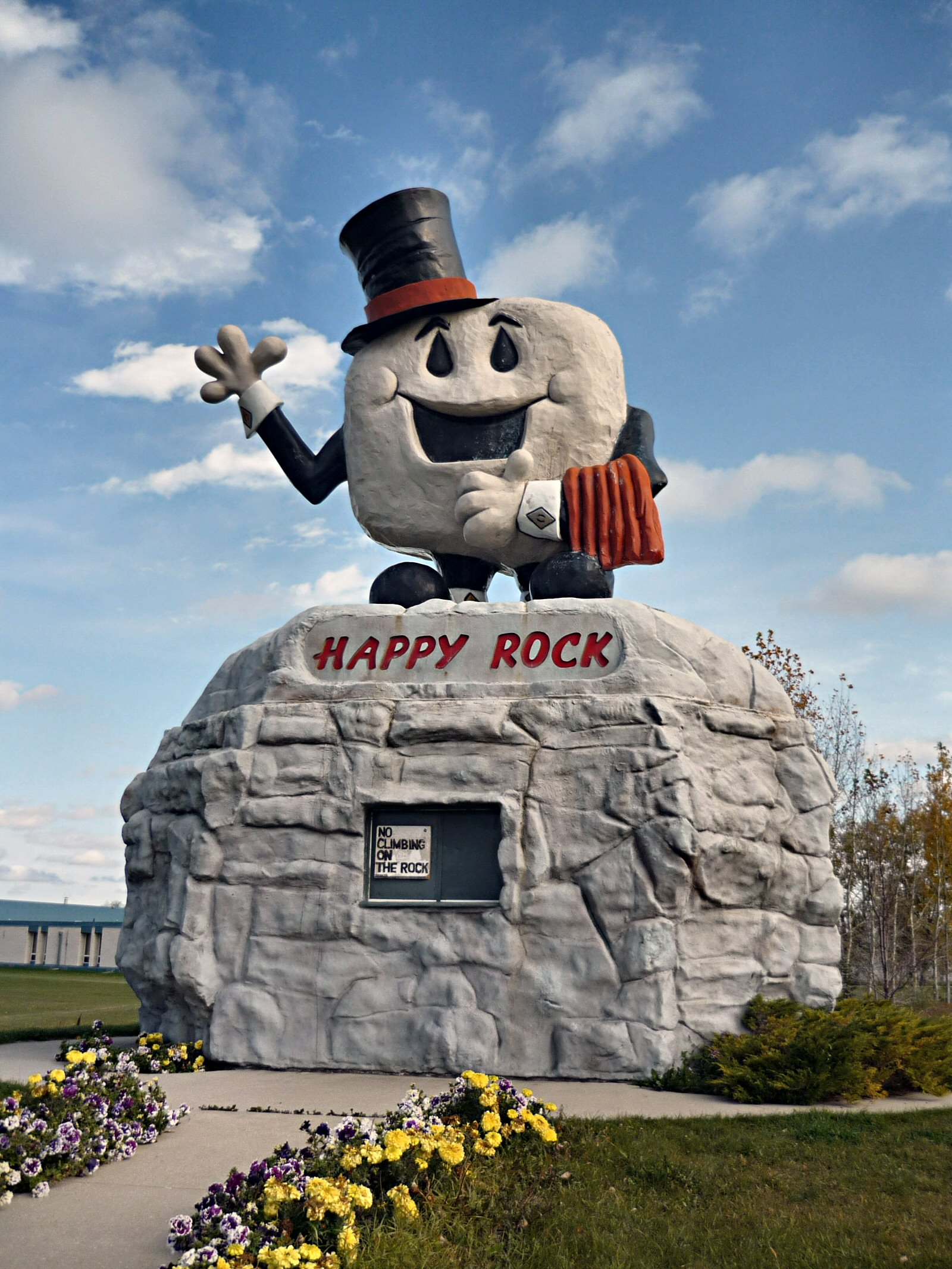
Happy Rock in Gladstone

- Gladstone
- MacGregor
- Notre Dame de Lourdes
- Treherne

== Rural municipalities ==
- Glenella – Lansdowne
- Lorne (part in Division No. 4)
- Norfolk Treherne
- North Norfolk
- Victoria
- WestLake-Gladstone

== Indian reserves ==
- Long Plain 6
- Sandy Bay 5
