= Brandon Indian Residential School =

Former residential school in Manitoba

Coordinates: 49.8692°N 99.9895°W

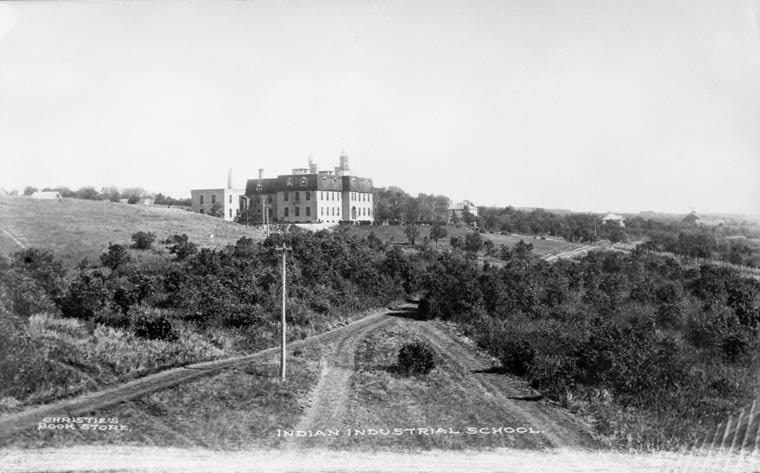
- The school in 1920
- Brandon, Manitoba; Canada

Information
- Former name: Brandon Industrial Institute
- Type: Canadian Indian residential school
- Religious affiliations: Methodist Church of Canada, United Church of Canada, Catholic Church in Canada
- Established: 1895
- Closed: 1972
- Authority: Methodist, 1895-1925; United Church, 1925-1969; Catholic, 1969-1972
- Oversight: Crown–Indigenous Relations and Northern Affairs Canada
- Gender: Coed
- Language: English

The Brandon Indian Residential School was a former school located in Brandon, Manitoba. It was a part of the former Canadian Indian residential school system.

== History ==
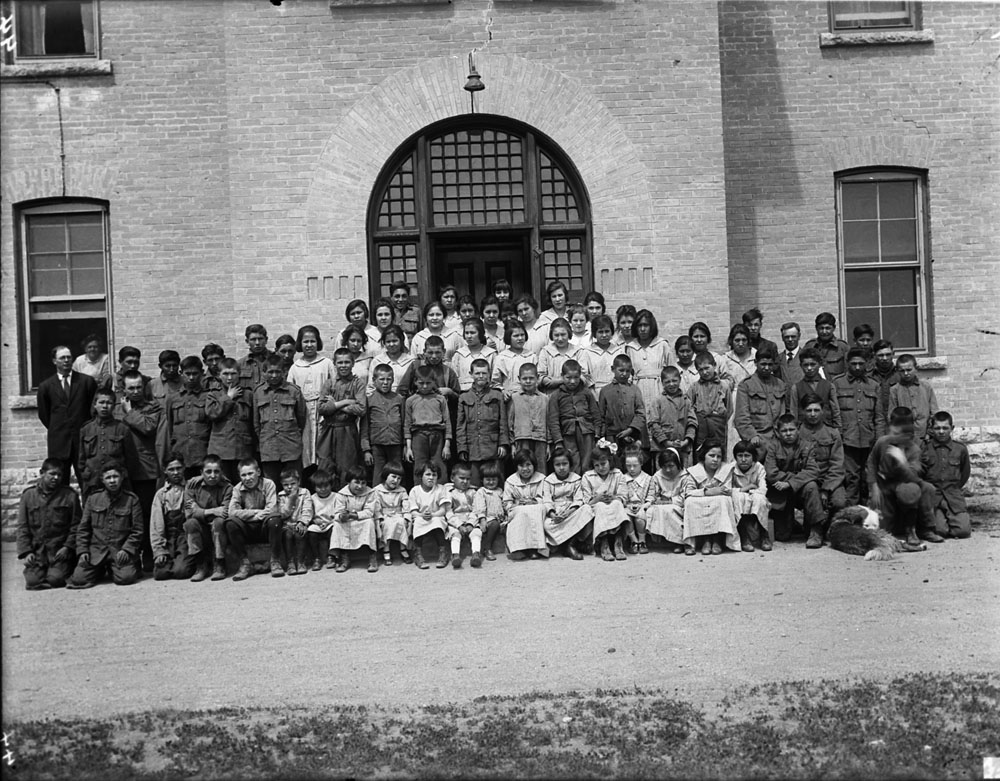
Students pose in front of the school in 1946

Five kilometres northwest of Brandon, Manitoba, the Brandon Indian Institute was established in 1895 by the Department of Indian Affairs. The school closed in 1972. From 1895 to 1925, the Mission Board of the Methodist Church initially managed the school, intended for children from north of Lake Winnipeg. The United Church of Canada ran the school 1925 to 1969, and the Missionary Oblates of Mary Immaculate from 1969 to 1972.

== Mortality ==
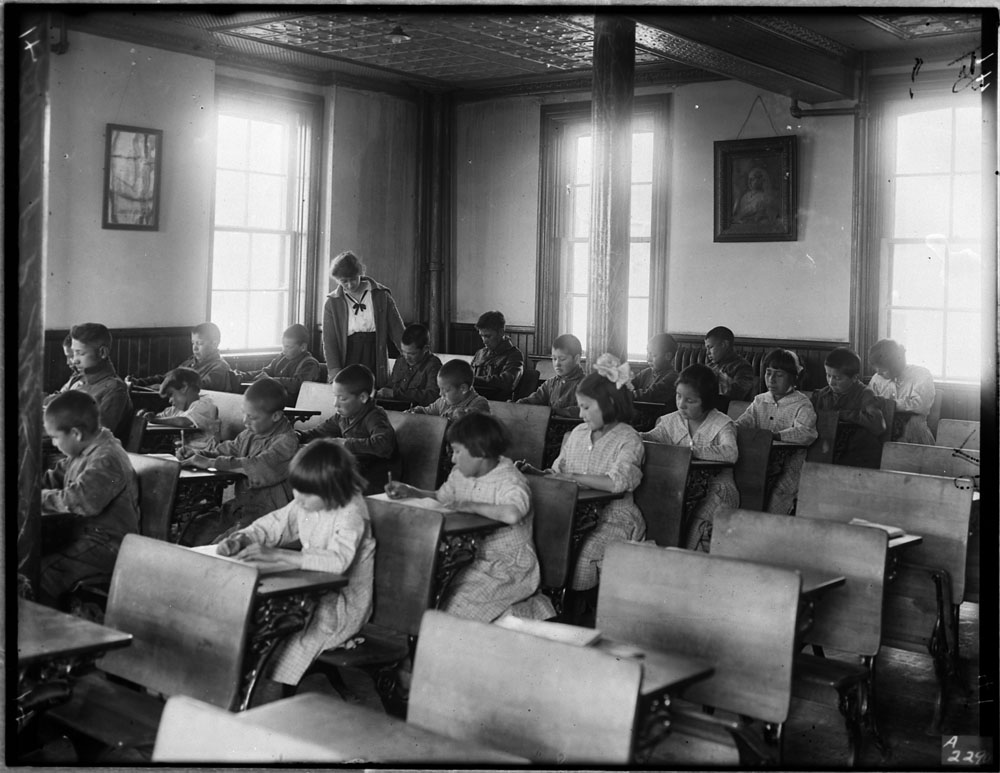
An interior of the school in 1946

The 1905 annual report of the Department of Indian Affairs’ annual report noted five deaths, and Methodist Church records, only three in that year. In the 77 years the school was open, nine deaths there were registered with the Manitoba Vital Statistics Agency.

The Truth and Reconciliation Commission of Canada found that over 120 years between 3,200 and 6,000 children died at the Residential Schools. The vast majority of deaths were due to tuberculosis and occurred prior to the development of the TB vaccine. Following the implementation of the TB vaccine program in the 1950s deaths at the schools approached zero.

== Burials ==
An investigation of cemeteries and unmarked graves at the Brandon school site began in 2012, a collaboration of the Sioux Valley Dakota Nation (SVDN) and researchers from Simon Fraser University, Brandon University and the University of Windsor, with the goal of identifying the children buried on the site. A statement by SVDN Chief Jennifer Bone said that the project had identified 104 ground disturbances that may be potential graves in three cemeteries. Cemetery and burial records account for only 78. Only excavation is able to confirm if the additional 26 sites identified by radar are actual burial sites or bad data. In addition to two previously known cemeteries, the project has found a possible third burial site. The project received funding to continue its work in April 2019, but work has been delayed due to the COVID-19 pandemic. One of the burial grounds is now an RV campground.
