= Grand Valley Provincial Park =

Provincial park in Manitoba, Canada

- Location within Manitoba
- Interactive map of Grand Valley Provincial Park
- Location: Manitoba, Canada
- Nearest town: Brandon, Manitoba
- Coordinates: 49°52′24″N 100°5′4″W
- Area: 26.19 ha (64.7 acres)
- Established: 1961
- Governing body: Government of Manitoba

Grand Valley Provincial Park is a provincial park located in the Assiniboine River Valley in Manitoba, Canada, about 13 kilometres (8.1 mi) west of Brandon. It is 26.19 hectares (0.1011 sq mi) in size. It was designated as a Provincial Park in 1961.

The park is located in the Stockton eco-district within the Aspen Parkland eco-region. This eco-region is part of the Prairies eco-zone.

== See also ==
- List of protected areas of Manitoba
- List of provincial parks in Manitoba
