= MacGregor, Manitoba =

MacGregor
- Former town

- Location of MacGregor in Manitoba
- Coordinates: 49°57′58″N 98°46′43″W
- Country: Canada
- Province: Manitoba
- Municipality: North Norfolk
- Amalgamated: 1 January 2015

Population (2016)
  - Total: 973
  - Density: 457.2/km^{2} (1,184/sq mi)
- Time zone: UTC-6 (Central (CST))
  - Summer (DST): UTC-5 (Central (CDT))
- Area code: 204
- Website: northnorfolk.ca

MacGregor is a community in the Canadian province of Manitoba. It held town status prior to January 1, 2015, when it amalgamated with the Rural Municipality of North Norfolk to form the Municipality of North Norfolk. MacGregor is located approximately 130 km (81 mi) west of Winnipeg and 80 km (50 mi) east of Brandon. It is a farming community, with the biggest industry in the area being agriculture. The community is surrounded by farms, and the Trans-Canada Highway is located just north of MacGregor.

== History ==
The town is named after the Very Rev James MacGregor by the Canadian Pacific Railway who named a railway station after him, during his visit with the Marquis of Lome, around which the town grew.

== Demographics ==
In the 2021 Census of Population conducted by Statistics Canada, MacGregor had a population of 962 living in 409 of its 422 total private dwellings, a change of −1.1% from its 2016 population of 973. With a land area of 2.13 km^{2} (0.82 sq mi), it had a population density of 451.6/km^{2} (1,169.8/sq mi) in 2021.

== Notable people ==
Notable individuals born or raised in MacGregor include former politician Leslie Harvard Eyres (1892–1983) and NDP cabinet minister Nancy Allan.
