= Municipality of North Norfolk =

Rural municipality in Manitoba, Canada

North Norfolk
- Rural municipality
- Municipality of North Norfolk
- MacGregor

- Location of the Municipality of North Norfolk in Manitoba
- Coordinates: 49°55′51″N 98°50′08″W
- Country: Canada
- Province: Manitoba
- Region: Central Plains
- Incorporated (amalgamated): January 1, 2015
- Time zone: UTC-6 (CST)
  - Summer (DST): UTC-5 (CDT)
- Website: www.northnorfolk.ca

The Municipality of North Norfolk (French: Municipalité de North Norfolk) is a rural municipality (RM) in the Canadian province of Manitoba.

== History ==
It was incorporated on January 1, 2015 via the amalgamation of the RM of North Norfolk and the Town of MacGregor. It was formed as a requirement of The Municipal Amalgamations Act, which required that municipalities with a population less than 1,000 amalgamate with one or more neighbouring municipalities by 2015. The Government of Manitoba initiated these amalgamations in order for municipalities to meet the 1997 minimum population requirement of 1,000 to incorporate a municipality.

== Communities ==
- Arizona
- Austin
- Bagot
- MacGregor
- Sidney

== Demographics ==
In the 2021 Census of Population conducted by Statistics Canada, North Norfolk had a population of 3,915 living in 1,352 of its 1,433 total private dwellings, a change of 1.6% from its 2016 population of 3,853. With a land area of 1,158.26 km^{2} (447.21 sq mi), it had a population density of 3.4/km^{2} (8.8/sq mi) in 2021.
