= Manitoba Provincial Road 340 =

Provincial road in Manitoba, Canada

Provincial Road 340
- PR 340 highlighted in red

Route information
- Maintained by Department of Infrastructure
- Length: 40.1 km (24.9 mi)
- Existed: 1966–present

Major junctions
- North end: PTH 1 (TCH) near Douglas
- South end: PTH 2 near Wawanesa

Location
- Country: Canada
- Province: Manitoba
- Rural municipalities: Cornwallis; Elton; Glenboro – South Cypress; Oakland – Wawanesa

Highway system
- Provincial highways in Manitoba; Winnipeg City Routes
← PR 338	→ PR 341

Provincial Road 340 (PR 340) is a provincial road in the Westman Region of the Canadian province of Manitoba, connecting Wawanesa with Treesbank, Sprucewoods, Cottonwoods, and the Trans-Canada Highway (PTH 1) at Douglas.

== Route description ==
The route begins at PTH 2 south of Wawanesa, and terminates at the Trans-Canada Highway just north of Douglas.

PR 340 is the main road that serves CFB Shilo. The route is paved at the northern and southern ends of the route, with a large gravel section connecting CFB Shilo with Treesbank.

== History ==
PR 340 was originally a much longer provincial road in comparison to its current distance. In the early 1990s, the Manitoba government decommissioned a number of provincial secondary roads and returned the maintenance of these roads back to the rural municipalities. The section of the original PR 340 between Treesbank and Belmont was included in this decommissioning.

Prior to this, PR 340 started at PTH 3 near Holmfield. From this point, it travelled north, meeting PTH 23 just south of Belmont. From Belmont, PR 340 continued north, with small jaunts eastward, before meeting PTH 2 west of Glenboro. The two highways would run in a short westbound concurrence before PR 340 left the concurrence and continued north through the community of Stockton. Once it passed Stockton, PR 340 gradually turned west towards Treesbank where it turned north once again. The highway rejoined its current configuration just north of the community after a short crossing over the Assiniboine River at Treesbank Ferry.

After the decommissioning of the original route, the section of PR 340 between PTH 3 and PTH 23 was redesignated as PR 458. As well, a small section around Treesbank was redesignated as PR 530, and PR 340 was reconfigured on to a road previously designated as PR 344. It is the stretch it travels on through Wawanesa (where it meets the current PR 344) to its current southern terminus with PTH 2. The sections of the original route that were not redesignated are now maintained by the rural municipalities of Oakland, South Cypress, and Strathcona.

The original length of PR 340 was 124 kilometres (77 mi).

== Major intersections ==
Division	Location	km	mi	Destinations	Notes
Oakland-Wawanesa		0.0	0.0	PTH 2 (Red Coat Trail) – Glenboro, Souris	Southern terminus
Oakland-Wawanesa	Wawanesa	2.3	1.4	PR 344 west (Main Street) – Wawanesa	Eastern terminus of PR 344
Oakland-Wawanesa	Wawanesa	2.7– 2.8	1.7– 1.7	Bridge over the Souris River	
Oakland-Wawanesa		7.4	4.6	Treesbank Road – Treesbank	Former PR 451 east (1966-1989); former PR 340 south (1989-1992)
Oakland-Wawanesa		10.7	6.6	PR 453 west – Rounthwaite	Eastern terminus of PR 453; former PR 344 north
Oakland-Wawanesa		14.2– 14.3	8.8– 8.9	Bridge over the Assiniboine River	
Glenboro-South Cypress		15.4	9.6	Aweme Road (Road 48N) – Criddle/Vane Homestead Provincial Park	
Cornwallis		26.3	16.3	Horsham Road – Canadian Forces Base Shilo	
Cornwallis	Sprucewoods	29.1	18.1	Shilo Road – Sprucewoods	
Cornwallis	Cottonwoods	34.8	21.6	PR 457 west (Veterans Way) – Brandon	Eastern terminus of PR 457
Elton	Douglas	40.1	24.9	PTH 1 (TCH) – Brandon, Winnipeg	Northern terminus; road continues north as Douglas Road (Road 98W)
1.000 mi = 1.609 km; 1.000 km = 0.621 mi

== Related route ==
Provincial Road 451
- Treesbank Road, Norfolk Street
- Location: Treesbank
- Length: 4.9 km (3.0 mi)
- Existed: 1966–1989

Provincial Road 451 (PR 451) was a 4.9-kilometre-long (3.0 mi) east-west highway in the Rural Municipalities of Oakland-Wawanesa and Glenboro-South Cypress, then Oakland and South Cypress, of the Westman Region of Manitoba. It served as a connection between the original alignments of PR 340 and PR 344, as well as forming the main thoroughfare for the hamlet of Treesbank, Norfolk Street. It was entirely a gravel two-lane road. Around 1989/1990, the highway was redesignated as part of a realignment of PR 340, which was moved westward to cross a new bridge over the Assiniboine River, rather than the old ferry at Treesbank Ferry. In 1992, the highway was decommissioned entirely and has been municipally maintained ever since, now known as Treesbank Road and Norfolk Street.

As it was circa 1989

Division	Location	km	mi	Destinations	Notes
Oakland-Wawanesa		0.0	0.0	PR 344 – Wawanesa, Brandon	Western terminus; road continues west as Treesbank Road
Glenboro-South Cypress	Treesbank	4.9	3.0	PR 340 – Treesbank Ferry, Stockton	Eastern terminus; now PR 530 south
1.000 mi = 1.609 km; 1.000 km = 0.621 mi: Concurrency terminus
