= Manitoba Highway 110 =

Provincial highway in Manitoba, Canada

Provincial Trunk Highway 110
- Brandon Eastern Access Route
- PTH 110 highlighted in red

Route information
- Auxiliary route of PTH 1
- Maintained by Manitoba Infrastructure
- Length: 14.1 km (8.8 mi)
- Existed: 1995–present

Major junctions
- South end: PTH 10 south of Brandon
- PR 457 east of Brandon
- North end: PTH 1 (TCH) east of Brandon

Location
- Country: Canada
- Province: Manitoba
- Rural municipalities: Cornwallis
- Major cities: Brandon

Highway system
- Provincial highways in Manitoba; Winnipeg City Routes
← PTH 101	→ PTH 190

Provincial Trunk Highway 110 (PTH 110), also known as the Brandon Eastern Access Route, is a provincial highway in the vicinity of Brandon, Manitoba, Canada.

PTH 110 is one of the four three-digit urban expressway routes in the Manitoba provincial highway network. It is a two-lane highway that connects the Trans-Canada Highway (PTH 1) to PTH 10 south of Brandon. It allows traffic going through Brandon to bypass the city, and provides easier access to the industrial areas located on the east side of the city. The route is an important component of the city of Brandon's truck route network, as it allows dangerous goods carriers to minimize risks and traffic in urban neighbourhoods.

== History ==
The first section of the highway between Richmond Avenue and PR 457, crossing the Assiniboine River, opened in 1995; PTH 110 was signed as "TEMP PTH 110" along PR 457 and PR 468 to connect with PTH 1. The second segment that connects Richmond Avenue to PTH 10 opened in 1999, while the last segment of the highway that connects PR 457 to the Trans-Canada Highway was completed in 2013. There is a proposal to extend PTH 110 west to the Trans-Canada Highway near Kemnay but there is no timeline for construction.

== Major intersections ==
Division	Location	km	mi	Destinations	Notes
Cornwallis		0.0	0.0	PTH 10 (18th Street / John Bracken Highway) – Boissevain, Minnedosa	Southern terminus
City of Brandon		7.4	4.6	Richmond Avenue	Former PR 344
City of Brandon		9.0	5.6	Victoria Avenue to PTH 1A (TCH)	
City of Brandon		10.1	6.3	Crosses the Assiniboine River	
Cornwallis		10.5	6.5	PR 457 east – Shilo	South end of PR 457 concurrency
Cornwallis		11.2	7.0	PR 457 west (Veteran's Way) – Brandon	North end of PR 457 concurrency
Cornwallis		14.1	8.8	PTH 1 (TCH) – Regina, Winnipeg	Northern terminus; road continues north as Road 105W
1.000 mi = 1.609 km; 1.000 km = 0.621 mi: Concurrency terminus
