= Spruce Woods (electoral district) =

Provincial electoral district in Manitoba, Canada

Coordinates: 49.553°N 99.360°W

Manitoba electoral district

Provincial electoral district
- Legislature: Legislative Assembly of Manitoba
MLA
Colleen Robbins
Progressive Conservative
- District created: 2008
- First contested: 2011
- Last contested: 2023

Demographics
- Population (2016): 22,810
- Electors (2019): 14,746
- Area (km²): 6,125
- Pop. density (per km²): 3.7
- Census division(s): Division No. 6, Division No. 7, Division No. 8
- Census subdivision(s): Brandon, Cornwallis, Elton, Glenboro-South Cypress, Oakland-Wawanesa, Riverdale, Sifton, Souris-Glenwood, Swan Lake 7A, Victoria, Whitehead

Spruce Woods is a provincial electoral district of Manitoba, Canada. It was created by redistribution in 2008 out of parts of Minnedosa and Turtle Mountain and notably gained parts of the city of Brandon and Arthur-Virden in the 2018 redistribution.

Following the 2018 redistribution, Spruce Woods includes the municipalities of Cornwallis, Elton, Glenboro – South Cypress, Oakland – Wawanesa, Riverdale, Sifton, Souris – Glenwood, Victoria, Whitehead and the portion of the city of Brandon located north of the Assiniboine River.

Outside of the city of Brandon, communities in the constituency include Glenboro, Holland, Oak Lake, Rivers, Souris, and Wawanesa. The constituency also includes the part of CFB Shilo that is within the Municipality of Glenboro - South Cypress.

The riding's population based on the 2016 census was 22,810.

== Members of the Legislative Assembly ==
| Assembly | Years | Member | Party |
|---|---|---|---|
Riding created from Minnedosa and Turtle Mountain
| 40th | 2011–2016 | Cliff Cullen | Progressive Conservative |
| 41st | 2016–2019 | Cliff Cullen | Progressive Conservative |
| 42nd | 2019–2023 | Cliff Cullen | Progressive Conservative |
| 43rd | 2023–2025 | Grant Jackson | Progressive Conservative |
| 43rd | 2025–present | Colleen Robbins | Progressive Conservative |

== Electoral results ==
=== 2025 by-election ===
Manitoba provincial by-election, August 26, 2025 Resignation of Grant Jackson
** Preliminary results — Not yet official **
| Party | Candidate | Votes | % | ±% | Expenditures |
|---|---|---|---|---|---|
| Progressive Conservative | Colleen Robbins | 2,805 | 46.88 | -14.93 | |
| New Democratic | Ray Berthelette | 2,735 | 45.71 | +21.71 | |
| Liberal | Stephen Reid | 444 | 7.42 | -6.77 | |
| Total valid votes/expense limit | | 5,984 | 99.60 | – | |
| Total rejected and declined ballots | | 24 | 0.40 | -0.38 | |
| Turnout | | 6,008 | 40.71 | -15.83 | |
| Eligible voters | | 14,757 | | | |
| Progressive Conservative hold | | Swing | | -18.32 | |

=== 2023 ===
2023 Manitoba general election
| Party | Candidate | Votes | % | ±% | Expenditures |
|---|---|---|---|---|---|
| Progressive Conservative | Grant Jackson | 4,986 | 61.81 | -6.26 | $13,312.67 |
| New Democratic | Melissa Ghidoni | 1,936 | 24.00 | +8.13 | $168.00 |
| Liberal | Michelle Budiwski | 1,145 | 14.19 | +7.98 | $6,413.47 |
| Total valid votes/expense limit | | 8,067 | 99.23 | – | $56,314.00 |
| Total rejected and declined ballots | | 63 | 0.77 | +0.24 | |
| Turnout | | 8,130 | 56.54 | -0.21 | |
| Eligible voters | | 14,379 | | | |
| Progressive Conservative hold | | Swing | | -7.19 | |
Source(s) Source: Elections Manitoba

=== 2019 ===
2019 Manitoba general election
| Party | Candidate | Votes | % | ±% | Expenditures |
|---|---|---|---|---|---|
| Progressive Conservative | Cliff Cullen | 5,665 | 68.06 | -3.3 | $12,334.55 |
| New Democratic | Justin Shannon | 1,321 | 15.87 | +2.3 | $1,211.77 |
| Green | Gordon Beddome | 820 | 9.85 | +8.2 | $0.00 |
| Liberal | Jennifer Harcus | 517 | 6.21 | -1.2 | $0.00 |
| Total valid votes | | 8,323 | 99.46 | – | |
| Rejected | | 45 | 0.54 | | |
| Turnout | | 8,368 | 56.75 | | |
| Eligible voters | | 14,746 | | | |
| Progressive Conservative hold | | Swing | | -2.8 | |
Source(s) Source: Manitoba. Chief Electoral Officer (2019). Statement of Votes for the 42nd Provincial General Election, September 10, 2019 (PDF) (Report). Winnipeg: Elections Manitoba. "Candidate Election Returns". Elections Manitoba. Elections Manitoba.

=== 2016 ===
2016 provincial election redistributed results
| Party | % |
|---|---|
| Progressive Conservative | 71.4 |
| New Democratic | 13.6 |
| Liberal | 7.4 |
| Manitoba | 6.0 |
| Green | 1.7 |

2016 Manitoba general election
| Party | Candidate | Votes | % | ±% | Expenditures |
|---|---|---|---|---|---|
| Progressive Conservative | Cliff Cullen | 5,210 | 73.12 | +6.47 | $13,262.74 |
| Manitoba | Malcolm McKellar | 738 | 10.36 | – | $3,614.69 |
| New Democratic | Amanda Chmelyk | 665 | 9.33 | -19.28 | $146.90 |
| Liberal | Jaron Hart | 512 | 7.19 | +2.46 | $5.84 |
| Total valid votes | | 7,125 | 98.57 | – | |
| Rejected | | 103 | 1.43 | +0.89 | |
| Turnout | | 7,228 | 51.99 | +3.35 | |
| Eligible voters | | 13,904 | | | |
| Progressive Conservative hold | | Swing | | -1.94 | |
Source(s) Source: Manitoba. Chief Electoral Officer (2016). Statement of Votes for the 41st Provincial General Election, April 19, 2016 (PDF) (Report). Winnipeg: Elections Manitoba. "Election Returns: 41st General Election". Elections Manitoba. 2016.

=== 2011 ===
2011 Manitoba general election
| Party | Candidate | Votes | % | Expenditures |
|---|---|---|---|---|
| Progressive Conservative | Cliff Cullen | 4,495 | 66.65 | $14,786.56 |
| New Democratic | Cory Szczepanski | 1,930 | 28.62 | $5,104.39 |
| Liberal | Trenton Zazalak | 319 | 4.73 | $2,227.13 |
| Total valid votes | | 6,744 | 99.47 | |
| Rejected | | 36 | 0.53 | |
| Turnout | | 6,780 | 48.64 | |
| Eligible voters | | 13,940 | | |
Source(s) Source: Manitoba. Chief Electoral Officer (2011). Statement of Votes for the 40th Provincial General Election, October 4, 2011 (PDF) (Report). Winnipeg: Elections Manitoba. "Election Returns: 40th General Election". Elections Manitoba. 2011.

== See also ==
- List of Manitoba provincial electoral districts
- Canadian provincial electoral districts
