= Manitoba Provincial Road 457 =

Provincial road in Manitoba, Canada

Provincial Road 457
- Veterans Way; Low Road to Shilo

Route information
- Maintained by Department of Infrastructure
- Length: 16.7 km (10.4 mi)
- Existed: 1966–present

Major junctions
- West end: PTH 1A (TCH) (1st Street N.) in Brandon
- PTH 110 near Brandon; PR 468 near Chater
- East end: PR 340 in Cottonwoods

Location
- Country: Canada
- Province: Manitoba
- Rural municipalities: Cornwallis
- Major cities: Brandon

Highway system
- Provincial highways in Manitoba; Winnipeg City Routes
← PR 455	→ PR 458

Provincial Road 457 (PR 457) is a provincial road in the Westman Region of the Canadian province of Manitoba. It connects the city of Brandon with Chater and Cottonwoods.

== Route description ==
Provincial Road 457 is an east-west route and runs from PR 340 in Cottonwoods to its terminus at PTH 1A (1st Street North) in Brandon.

PR 457, along with PR 340, serves as the main connector route between Brandon and CFB Shilo. Because of this, and that it travels at a lower elevation than the Trans-Canada Highway, the road is known locally as the "Low Road to Shilo".

PR 457 is a paved road for its entire length. The speed limit along this road is 90 kilometres per hour (56 mph).

== Major intersections ==
Division	Location	km	mi	Destinations	Notes
City of Brandon		0.0	0.0	PTH 1A (TCH) (First Street N); Kirkcaldy Drive	Western terminus; road continues west as Kirkcaldy Drive
Cornwallis		5.2	3.2	PTH 110 north (Brandon Eastern Access Route) to PTH 1 (TCH)	Western end of PTH 110 concurrency
Cornwallis		5.9	3.7	PTH 110 south (Brandon Eastern Access Route) – Boissevain	Eastern end of PTH 110 concurrency
Cornwallis		8.2– 8.3	5.1– 5.2	Bridge over Willow Creek	
Cornwallis		9.4	5.8	PR 468 north – Chater	Southern terminus of PR 468
Cornwallis	Cottonwoods	17.5	10.9	PR 340 – Douglas, Canadian Forces Base Shilo	Eastern terminus; road continues east as Ryan Road (Road 58N)
1.000 mi = 1.609 km; 1.000 km = 0.621 mi: Concurrency terminus
