= Manitoba Provincial Road 453 =

Provincial road in Manitoba, Canada

Provincial Road 453
- PR 453 highlighted in red

Route information
- Maintained by Department of Infrastructure
- Length: 24.6 km (15.3 mi)
- Existed: 1966–present

Major junctions
- West end: PTH 10 south of Brandon
- East end: PR 340 near Criddle/Vane Homestead Provincial Park

Location
- Country: Canada
- Province: Manitoba
- Rural municipalities: Oakland-Wawanesa

Highway system
- Provincial highways in Manitoba; Winnipeg City Routes
← PR 452	→ PR 455

Provincial Road 453 (PR 453) is a 24.6-kilometre-long (15.3 mi) east–west highway in the Westman Region of Manitoba. It provides the primary road access to the hamlet of Rounthwaite, as well as to the south side of the Brandon Hills Wildlife Management Area.

== Route description ==
PR 453 begins several kilometres to the south of Brandon at a junction with PTH 10 (John Bracken Highway), heading east along Road 47N on the south side of the Brandon Hills Wildlife Management Area for a few kilometres before making an abrupt right turn onto Road 107W. After crossing a marshland and a small creek, it makes a left turn onto Road 46N, following it through rural farmland. The highway now makes an abrupt right onto Road 104W (former PR 344), then quickly a left onto Road 45N, to pass along the south side of Rounthwaite, connected via Hendry Avenue. After passing through more rural farmland, PR 453 comes to an end at an intersection with PR 340. The entire length of PR 453 is a gravel, two lane highway, wholly within the Municipality of Oakland-Wawanesa.

== History ==
Prior to 1992, PR 453 only extended 11.5 kilometres (7.1 mi) from PTH 10 to what was then PR 344 (now Road 104W). When that section of PR 344 was decommissioned, PR 453 was extended over the former's routing through Rountwaite to its current terminus at what is now PR 340.

== Major intersections ==
Division	Location	km	mi	Destinations	Notes
Oakland-Wawanesa		0.0	0.0	PTH 10 (John Bracken Highway) – Boissevain, Brandon	Western terminus; road continues west as Road 47N
Oakland-Wawanesa		11.5	7.1	Road 104W – Brandon	Former PR 344 north
Oakland-Wawanesa	Rounthwaite	15.4	9.6	Hendry Avenue – Rounthwaite	
Oakland-Wawanesa		24.6	15.3	PR 340 – Douglas, Wawanesa	Eastern terminus; former PR 344 south
1.000 mi = 1.609 km; 1.000 km = 0.621 mi
