= Manitoba Provincial Road 344 =

Provincial road in Manitoba, Canada

Provincial Road 344
- PR 344 highlighted in red

Route information
- Maintained by Department of Infrastructure
- Length: 6.1 km (3.8 mi)
- Existed: 1966–present

Major junctions
- East end: PR 340 in Wawanesa
- West end: PTH 2 west of Wawanesa

Location
- Country: Canada
- Province: Manitoba
- Rural municipalities: Oakland – Wawanesa

Highway system
- Provincial highways in Manitoba; Winnipeg City Routes
← PR 343	→ PR 345

Provincial Road 344 (PR 344) is a very short provincial road in the Westman Region of the Canadian province of Manitoba. It connects the town of Wawanesa with PTH 2 (Red Coat Trail) on its western side.

== Route description ==
The route begins at PTH 2 west of Wawanesa, and terminates at PR 340 in the village. The route is paved for its entire length, being known as Main Street through town. It crosses a narrow one-lane bridge over the Souris River.

== History ==
The current PR 344 was originally a small connector spur of what was a much longer north–south provincial road. In the early 1990s, the Manitoba government decommissioned a number of provincial secondary roads and returned the maintenance of these roads back to the rural municipalities. All of the original PR 344 other than the current route was included in this decommissioning.

Prior to this, PR 344 started at PTH 23 near Dunrea. From this point, it travelled north for 22 kilometres (14 mi), meeting PTH 2 about one kilometre west of the current southbound terminus for PR 340, where it would continue north through Wawanesa. After leaving Wawanesa, PR 344 continued north for 47 kilometres (29 mi), meeting eastbound PR 451 and westbound PR 453 as well as making two lengthy east–west jaunts before entering Brandon in the far southeastern corner of the city. Once within Brandon's city limits, PR 344 originally followed 17th Street East to Victoria Avenue East. The highway turned west on to Victoria Avenue and terminated at a junction with PTH 1A at 1st Street.

In 1968, PR 344 was rerouted from 17th Street East along Richmond Avenue for 3 kilometres (1.9 mi) to its northbound terminus with PTH 10 at 18th Street.

After the decommissioning of the original route, PR 340 was rerouted onto the former section of the highway between Treesbank and Wawanesa. As well, PR 453, which originally terminated eastbound at PR 344, was extended from its old terminus to PR 340 near Treesbank using the previous PR 344 route past the unincorporated community of Rounthwaite. The section of the former PR 344 between PTH 23 and PTH 2 and between PR 453 and Brandon are now municipal roads.

The original length of PR 344 was 76 kilometres (47 mi).

== Major intersections ==
Division	Location	km	mi	Destinations	Notes
Oakland-Wawanesa		0.0	0.0	PTH 2 (Red Coat Trail) – Glenboro, Souris	Western terminus
Oakland-Wawanesa	Wawanesa	5.2– 5.3	3.2– 3.3	Bridge over the Souris River	
Oakland-Wawanesa	Wawanesa	6.1	3.8	PR 340 (First Street / Main Street)	Eastern terminus
1.000 mi = 1.609 km; 1.000 km = 0.621 mi
