= Manitoba Provincial Road 468 =

Provincial road in Manitoba, Canada

Provincial Road 468

Route information
- Maintained by Department of Infrastructure
- Length: 23 km (14 mi)
- Existed: 1966–present

Major junctions
- North end: PR 353 near Moore Park
- PTH 1 (TCH) near Chater
- South end: PR 457 near Chater

Location
- Country: Canada
- Province: Manitoba
- Rural municipalities: Elton, Cornwallis

Highway system
- Provincial highways in Manitoba; Winnipeg City Routes
← PR 467	→ PR 469

Provincial Road 468 (PR 468) is a provincial road in the Westman Region of the Canadian province of Manitoba. It connects the hamlets of Chater, Justice, and Moore Park with the Trans-Canada Highway (PTH 1).

== Route description ==
PR 468 is a north–south provincial road that begins at PR 457 near Chater, and travels to its northbound terminus with PR 353 near the unincorporated community of Moore Park.

The road provides north–south access to the unincorporated communities of Chater and Justice, and it intersects with the Trans-Canada Highway between these two communities.

PR 468 is paved between its southbound terminus and the Trans-Canada Highway and is a gravel road for the remainder of the route.

== History ==
In the early 1990s, the Manitoba government decommissioned a number of provincial secondary roads and returned the maintenance of these roads back to the rural municipalities. A small portion of the original PR 468 was included in this decommissioning.

Prior to this, PR 468 continued east in concurrence with PR 353 for 1.6 kilometres (0.99 mi) past Moore Park. From this point, it continued north into the Rural Municipality of Minto-Odanah to its terminus with PR 465. This section is now a municipal road.

The original length of PR 468 was 35 kilometres (22 mi).

== Major intersections ==
Division	Location	km	mi	Destinations	Notes
Cornwallis		0.0	0.0	PR 457 (Veteran's Way) – Brandon, Shilo	Southern terminus; southern end of paved section
Cornwallis		0.4	0.25	Bridge over Willow Creek	
Cornwallis	Chater	1.3	0.81	3rd Avenue – Chater	
Cornwallis / Elton		3.3	2.1	PTH 1 (TCH) – Brandon, Portage la Prairie	Northern end of paved section
Elton	Justice	16.4	10.2	Railway Road (Road 67N) – Forrest, Ingelow	Former PR 561 west
Elton		23.0	14.3	PR 353 – Brookdale, Moore Park	Northern terminus; road continues north as Road 102W
1.000 mi = 1.609 km; 1.000 km = 0.621 mi
