= Division No. 7, Manitoba =

Census division in Canada

Coordinates: 49°48′00″N 99°46′45″W

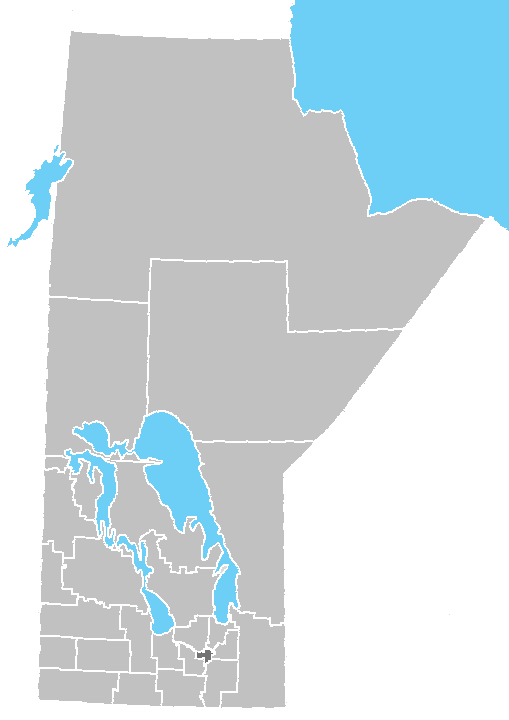

Division No. 7 (Brandon Area) is a census division located within the Westman Region in the south western area of the province of Manitoba, Canada. Unlike in some other provinces, census divisions do not reflect the organization of local government in Manitoba. These areas exist solely for the purposes of statistical analysis and presentation; they have no government of their own.

The area's major service centre is the city of Brandon, the second largest city in the province. The area population in 2021 was 70,896 The major industries of the Brandon area are agriculture, fertilizer manufacturing, livestock production, and packaging. The Canadian Forces are a major employer due to their training base (CFB Shilo) near the community of Shilo.

== Demographics ==
In the 2021 Census of Population conducted by Statistics Canada, Division No. 7 had a population of 70,896 living in 28,490 of its 30,404 total private dwellings, a change of 3.1% from its 2016 population of 68,746. With a land area of 6,333.21 km^{2} (2,445.27 sq mi), it had a population density of 11.2/km^{2} (29.0/sq mi) in 2021.

== Cities ==
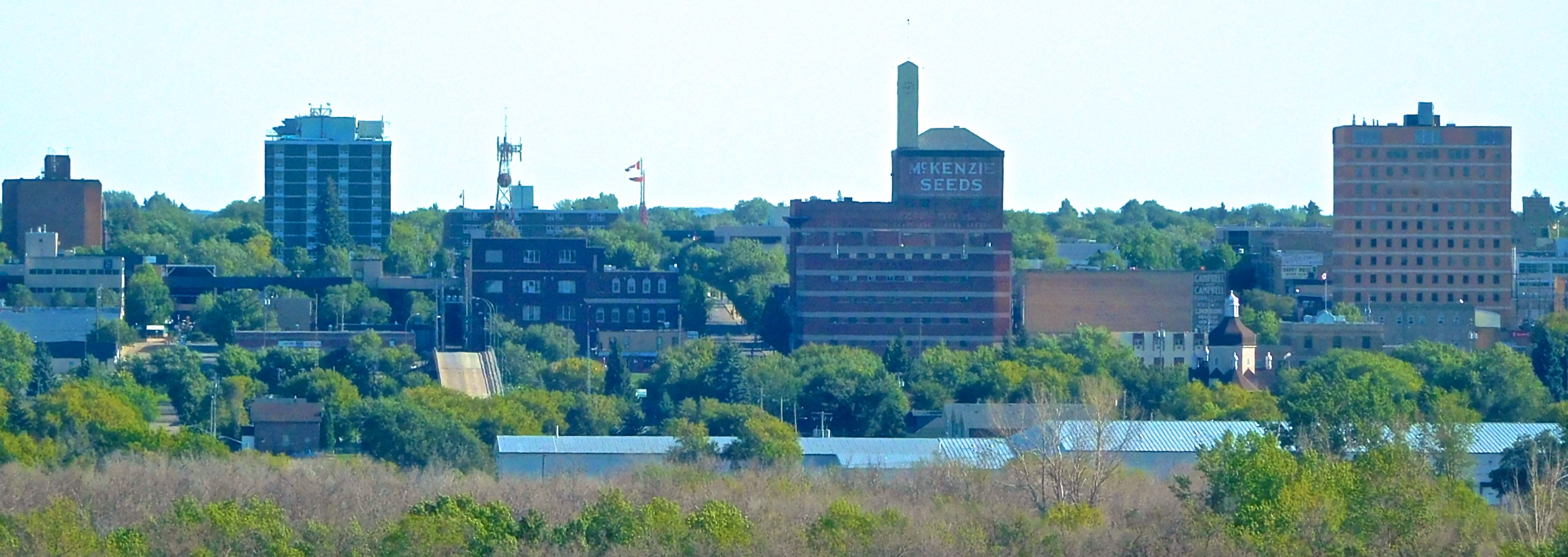
Brandon

- Brandon

== Towns ==
- Carberry

== Unincorporated communities ==
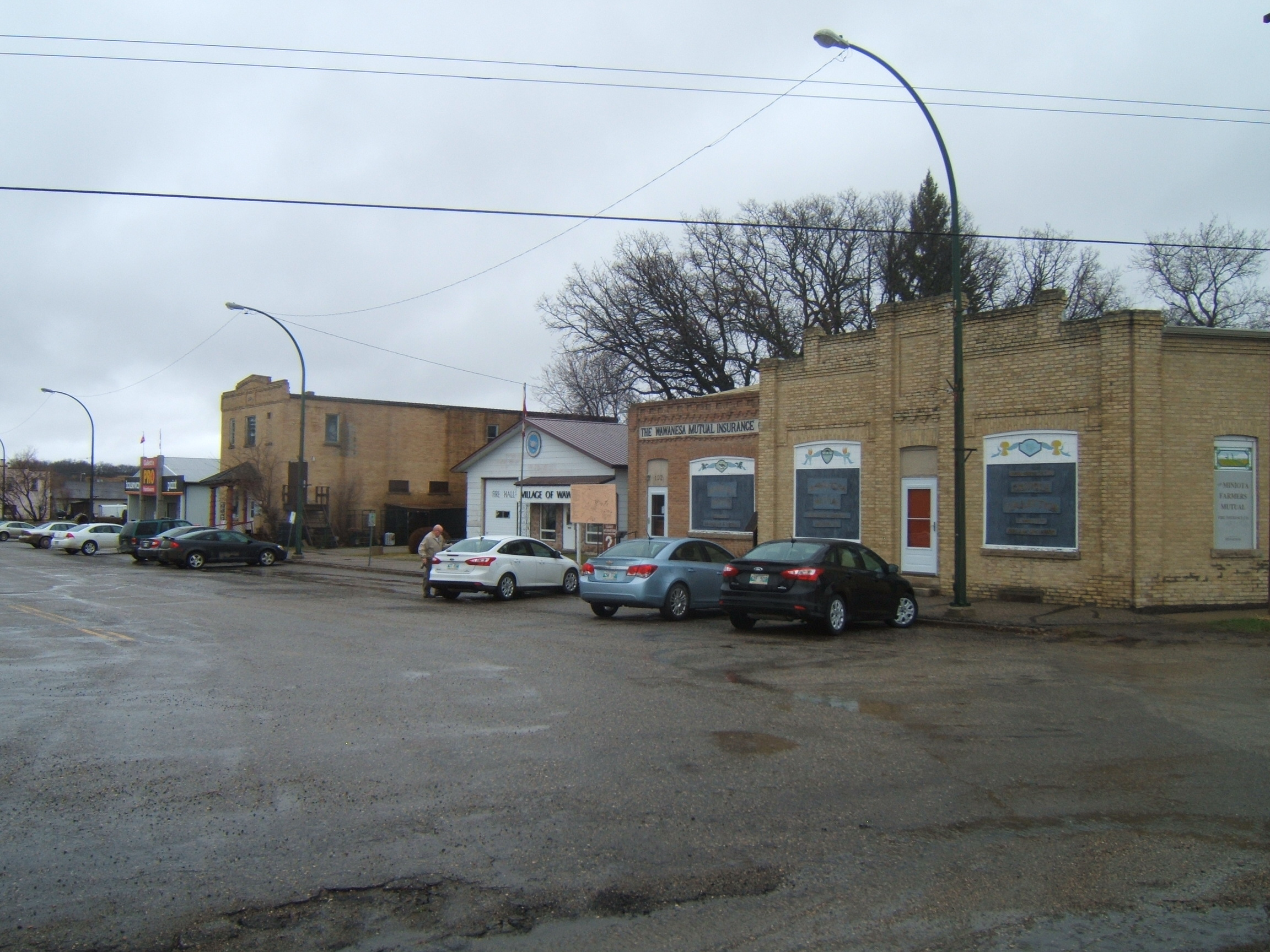
Wawanesa

- Glenboro
- Ingelow
- Rivers
- Souris
- Wawanesa

== Municipalities ==
- Cornwallis
- Elton
- Glenboro – South Cypress
- North Cypress – Langford (part in Division No. 15)
- Oakland – Wawanesa
- Riverdale
- Souris – Glenwood
- Whitehead
