= Wawanesa =

Wawanesa may refer to:

- Wawanesa, Manitoba, a community in Manitoba, Canada
- The Wawanesa Mutual Insurance Co., a Canadian-based insurance company
