= Charles Deildal =

Canadian ice hockey player

- Born: May 8, 1894 Glenboro, Manitoba, Canada
- Died: October 19, 1971 (aged 77) New Westminster, British Columbia, Canada
- Position: Right wing
- Played for: Victoria Cougars
- Playing career: 1912–1923

Albert Christian Vigfusson Deildal (May 8, 1894 – October 19, 1971) was a Canadian professional ice hockey player.

Deildal played for the Victoria Senators in the Victoria City Senior League from 1920 until 1922. Deildal joined the Victoria Cougars of the Pacific Coast Hockey Association for one game in the 1922–23 season.
