= Rabdophaga rosacea =

Scientific classification
- Kingdom: Animalia
- Phylum: Arthropoda
- Class: Insecta
- Order: Diptera
- Family: Cecidomyiidae
- Genus: Rabdophaga
- Species: R. rosacea

Binomial name
- Rabdophaga rosacea (Felt, 1908)

Species of fly

Rabdophaga rosacea is a species of gall midge that creates rosette galls on roses found in the central plains of North America.

The species was first described in 1908 by Ephraim Porter Felt from a collection made by Norman Criddle in Aweme, Manitoba, Canada. The holotype, an adult male, is in the New York State Museum collection.

== Description ==
The midge causes galls to form on the terminal buds of native roses (Rosa spp.) The galls are tightly packed leafy rosettes with a central cavity.

== Etymology ==
The genus name 'Rabdophaga' is formed from two Greek roots; rhabdos- meaning a rod or staff and -phaga meaning 'eater' In older references the genus name is spelled 'Rhabdophaga'. The specific name 'rosacea' refers to the genus of plants that are the hosts of the midge.

== Taxonomy ==
As gall midges are one of the most diverse yet least known groups of true flies, a taxonomic revision of the world fauna of this group is in process. In 2014, it was proposed that Rhadophaga rosacea be placed in Dasineura, a broadly defined polyphyletic genus of gall midges, as Dasineura rosacea. Both Radophaga and Dasineura are within the tribe Dasineurini, a group of plant feeders that share several physical similarities.
