= Manitoba Provincial Road 464 =

Provincial road in Manitoba, Canada

Provincial Road 464

Route information
- Maintained by Department of Infrastructure
- Length: 37.8 km (23.5 mi)
- Existed: 1966–present

Major junctions
- North end: PTH 16 (TCH) / YH near Neepawa
- PR 465 west PR 353 at Brookdale
- South end: PTH 1 (TCH) near Camp Hughes

Location
- Country: Canada
- Province: Manitoba
- Rural municipalities: North Cypress – Langford

Highway system
- Provincial highways in Manitoba; Winnipeg City Routes
← PR 463	→ PR 465

Provincial Road 464 (PR 464) is a 37.8-kilometre-long (23.5 mi) north-south provincial road in the Westman Region of the Canadian province of Manitoba.

== Route description ==
PR 464 is a north-south provincial road that begins at the Trans-Canada Highway near the Camp Hughes National Historic Site, and travels to its northbound terminus with the Yellowhead Highway west of Neepawa.

The road provides north-south access to the unincorporated community of Brookdale, where it intersects with PR 353. It is also the eastbound terminus for PR 465 approximately 8 kilometres (5 mi) north of Brookdale.

Besides a short section in Brookdale, PR 464 is a gravel road for its entire length.

== Major intersections ==
Division	Location	km	mi	Destinations	Notes
North Cypress-Langford		0.0	0.0	PTH 1 (TCH) – Brandon, Portage la Prairie	Southern terminus; road continues south as Road 93W
North Cypress-Langford		9.8	6.1	Ingelow Road (Road 67N) – Ingelow	
North Cypress-Langford	Brookdale	17.8	11.1	McNaughton Avenue W – Brookdale	
North Cypress-Langford	Brookdale	17.9	11.1	Railway Avenue – Brookdale	
North Cypress-Langford	Brookdale	18.0	11.2	PR 353 – Moore Park, Wellwood	
North Cypress-Langford		24.6	15.3	Road 75N – Hallboro	Former PR 465 west
North Cypress-Langford	Mentmore	26.3	16.3	PR 465 west – Cordova	Eastern terminus of PR 465
North Cypress-Langford		37.8	23.5	PTH 16 (TCH) / YH – Minnedosa, Neepawa	Northern terminus
1.000 mi = 1.609 km; 1.000 km = 0.621 mi
