= Rural Municipality of South Cypress =

Rural municipality in Manitoba, Canada

Coordinates: 49°39′54″N 99°22′15″W

The Rural Municipality of South Cypress is a former rural municipality (RM) in the Canadian province of Manitoba. It was originally incorporated as a rural municipality on December 22, 1883. It ceased on January 1, 2015 as a result of its provincially mandated amalgamation with the Village of Glenboro to form the Municipality of Glenboro – South Cypress.

The former RM is located in the Westman Region of the province and contains most of Spruce Woods Provincial Park and most of Spruce Woods Provincial Forest. The 2006 census reported a population of 834.

== Communities ==
- Ashdown
- Aweme
- Skalholt
- Stockton
- Treesbank
