= Artillery museum =

Type of museum

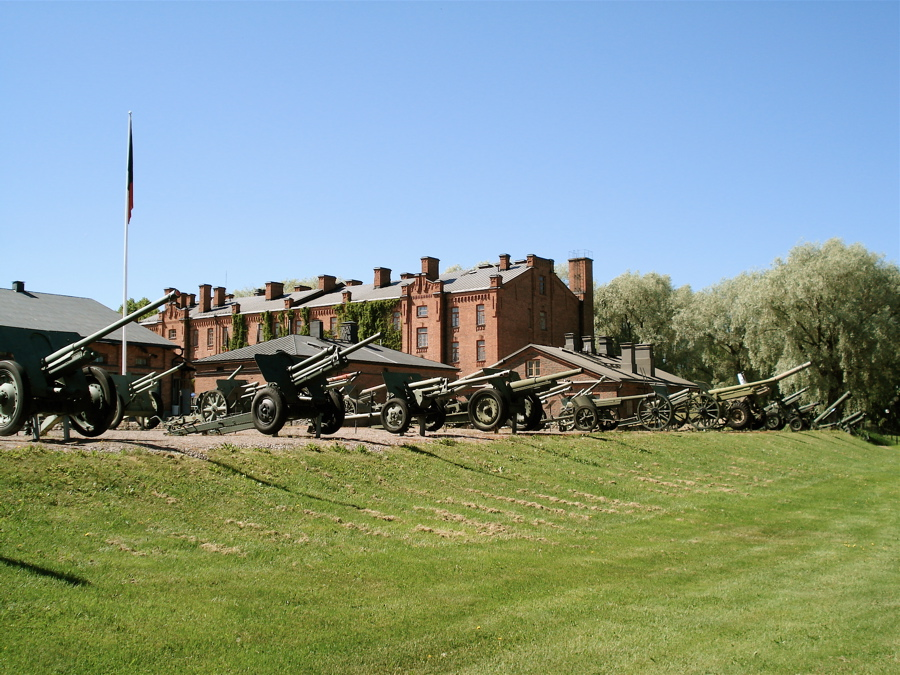
The Artillery Museum of Finland, Hämeenlinna

An artillery museum is a museum exhibiting the history and artifacts of artillery. In addition to actual or replica ordnance (guns, mortars, ammunition, etc.), exhibits can include photographs, maps, models, dioramas, clothing and equipment used by gunners.

Artillery museums may be owned by national, regional or local governments or entities, or by private associations. They may display their equipment only statically or in working order (e.g.: self-propelled guns).

Some museums have sets of periodicals, technical manuals, photographs and personal archives. These are often made available to researchers for use in writing articles or books, or to restoration specialists.

== List of artillery museums ==
There are dozens of artillery museums around the world. Among the most notable are the following.

- Artillery Museum, Saint Jo, Texas, United States
- Artillerimuseet, in Kristianstad, Sweden
- The Artillery Museum of Finland, in Hämeenlinna, Finland
- The Coast Artillery Museum, in Fort Worden, United States
- Firepower: The Royal Artillery Museum, in London, England, United Kingdom
- Fort Nelson, Portsmouth, the Royal Armouries artillery collection in Hampshire, England, United Kingdom
- Military Historical Museum of Artillery, Engineers and Signal Corps, in Saint Petersburg, Russia
- Museum of Artillery, in Draguignan, France
- Australian Army Artillery Museum, Sydney, Australia
- US Army Artillery Museum, on Fort Sill, Oklahoma, USA
- Royal Canadian Artillery Museum CFB Shilo, Manitoba, Canada
- Rock Island Arsenal, Rock Island, Illinois
- American Heritage Museum, Stow, Massachusetts (Greater Boston), USA
