= 2025 Spruce Woods provincial by-election =

Manitoba by-election

- August 26, 2025

Riding of Spruce Woods
- Turnout: 40.71% (▼15.83pp)
	First party	Second party	Third party
	PC	NDP	LIB
Candidate	Colleen Robbins	Ray Berthelette	Stephen Reid
Party	Progressive Conservative	New Democratic	Liberal
Popular vote	2,805	2,735	444
Percentage	46.88%	45.71%	7.42%
Swing	▼14.93%	▲21.71%	▼6.77%
MLA before election
Grant Jackson
Progressive Conservative
Elected MLA
Colleen Robbins
Progressive Conservative

The 2025 Spruce Woods provincial by-election was held on August 26.

== Background ==
The Riding was declared vacant after the former MLA Grant Jackson resigned from the Legislative Assembly on March 24 to run for the House of Commons riding of Brandon—Souris in the 2025 Canadian federal election.

On July 25, Premier Wab Kinew announced that a by-election would be held in Spruce Woods on August 26.

Progressive Conservative candidate Colleen Robbins narrowly won the riding by 70 votes, with NDP candidate Ray Berthelette delivering the party's best result in the riding since it was first contested in 2011.

== Candidates ==
=== Progressive Conservative ===
On June 4, the Progressive Conservative Party announced they had nominated Colleen Robbins as their candidate for the by-election. She formerly served as their regional director for southwestern Manitoba.

=== New Democratic ===
On July 24, the New Democratic Party announced that they had nominated Ray Berthelette as their candidate for the by-election. He works as a real estate agent and was the former executive assistant to Cabinet Minister Glen Simard.

=== Liberal ===
On May 25, the Liberal Party announced that they had nominated Stephen Reid, a high school teacher, as their candidate.

== Result ==
Manitoba provincial by-election, August 26, 2025: Spruce Woods Resignation of Grant Jackson
** Preliminary results — Not yet official **
Party	Candidate	Votes	%	±%	Expenditures
Progressive Conservative	Colleen Robbins	2,805	46.88	-14.93	
New Democratic	Ray Berthelette	2,735	45.71	+21.71	
Liberal	Stephen Reid	444	7.42	-6.77	
Total valid votes/expense limit		5,984	99.60	–	
Total rejected and declined ballots		24	0.40	-0.38	
Turnout		6,008	40.71	-15.83	
Eligible voters		14,757			
Progressive Conservative hold		Swing		-18.32	

== Previous result ==
2023 Manitoba general election: Spruce Woods
Party	Candidate	Votes	%	±%	Expenditures
Progressive Conservative	Grant Jackson	4,986	61.81	-6.26	$13,312.67
New Democratic	Melissa Ghidoni	1,936	24.00	+8.13	$168.00
Liberal	Michelle Budiwski	1,145	14.19	+7.98	$6,413.47
Total valid votes/expense limit		8,067	99.23	–	$56,314.00
Total rejected and declined ballots		63	0.77	+0.24	
Turnout		8,130	56.54	-0.21	
Eligible voters		14,379			
Progressive Conservative hold		Swing		-7.19	
Source(s) Source: Elections Manitoba
