= Spruce Woods Provincial Park =

Provincial park in Manitoba, Canada

- IUCN category II (national park)
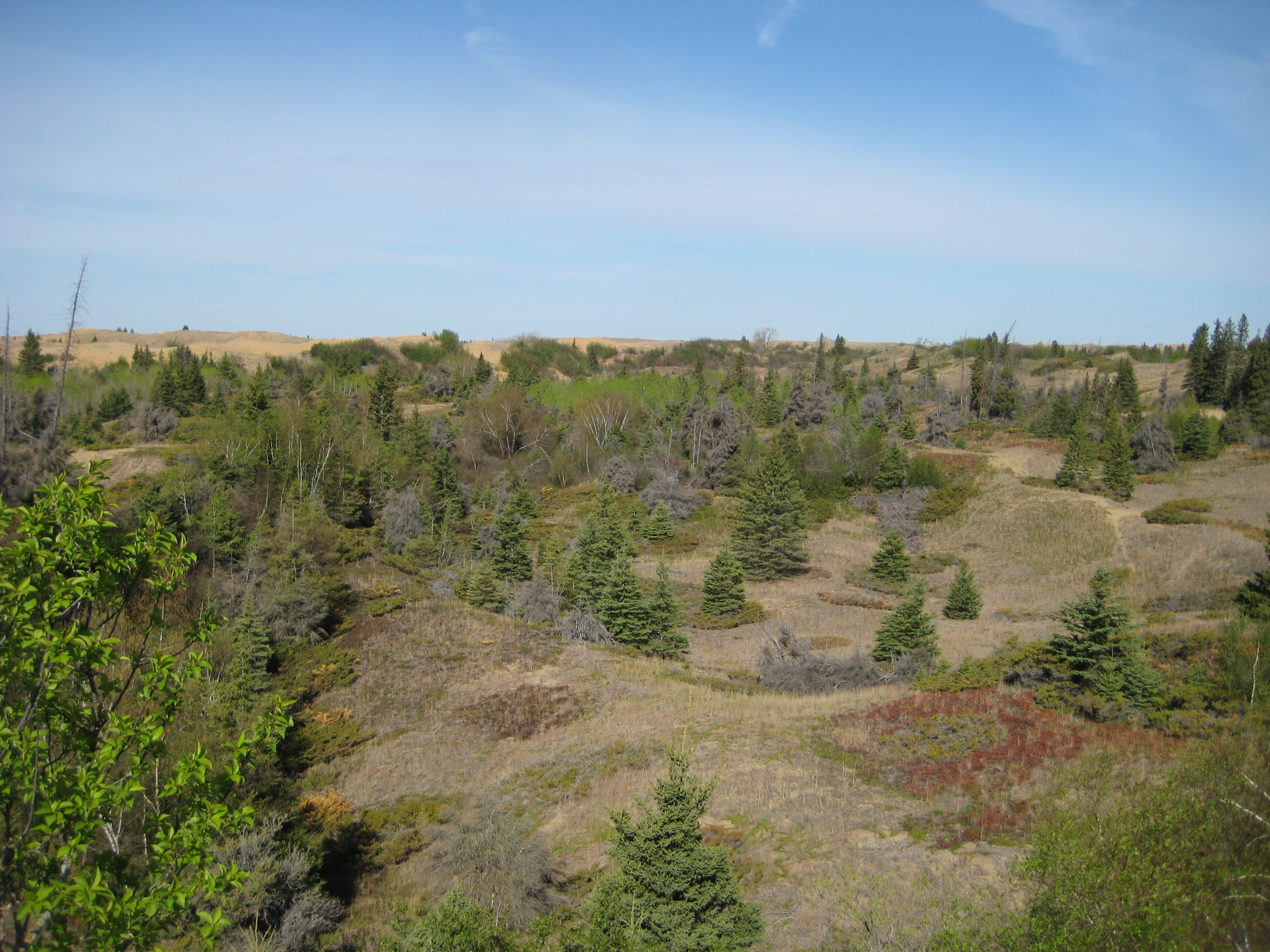
- Spruce Woods Provincial Park as seen from the Spirit Sands observation tower

- Location within Manitoba
- Interactive map of Spruce Woods Provincial Park
- Location: Manitoba, Canada
- Nearest town: Glenboro, Manitoba
- Coordinates: 49°42′34″N 99°5′50″W
- Area: 269 km^{2} (104 sq mi)
- Established: April 8, 1964
- Governing body: Government of Manitoba

Spruce Woods Provincial Park is located in south-central Manitoba, Canada where the Assiniboine River passes through the delta of sediment left by the last glaciation. An area of open and stabilized sand dunes within the park provides habitat to species of plants and animals not found elsewhere in Manitoba. In descending order of land area contained, the park lies within the Rural Municipalities of South Cypress, Victoria, and North Cypress.

The Government of Manitoba designated the area a provincial park on April 8, 1964. The park is 269 square kilometres (104 sq mi) in size. The park is considered to be a Class II protected area under the IUCN protected area management categories. In 2020 it was designated a Canadian Dark-Sky Preserve by the Royal Astronomical Society of Canada.

== History ==
Several Manitoba Historical Plaques have been placed within the park:

- to commemorate Assiniboine (Nakota) First Nation's role in Manitoba's heritage.
- to commemorate Norman Criddle's role in Manitoba's heritage.
- to commemorate Fort des Épinettes - Pine Fort's role in Manitoba's heritage.

=== Wreck of the Alpha ===
The Alpha, a steamboat operated by the Red River Transportation Company, was wrecked on April 27, 1885 as it was travelling upstream on the flooded Assiniboine River on its way to Brandon. The captain had left the main channel and run aground.

The cargo and much of the machinery was removed when the crew left the boat unguarded after the incident. Attempts to salvage the boat by the owners were abandoned. The remains were first buried by silt carried by seasonal floods, then revealed by later erosion.

The wreck is located within the park, upstream from the eastern boundary. It is only visible when the water is low.

The Alpha’s rudder and quadrant are in the collection of the Marine Museum of Manitoba.

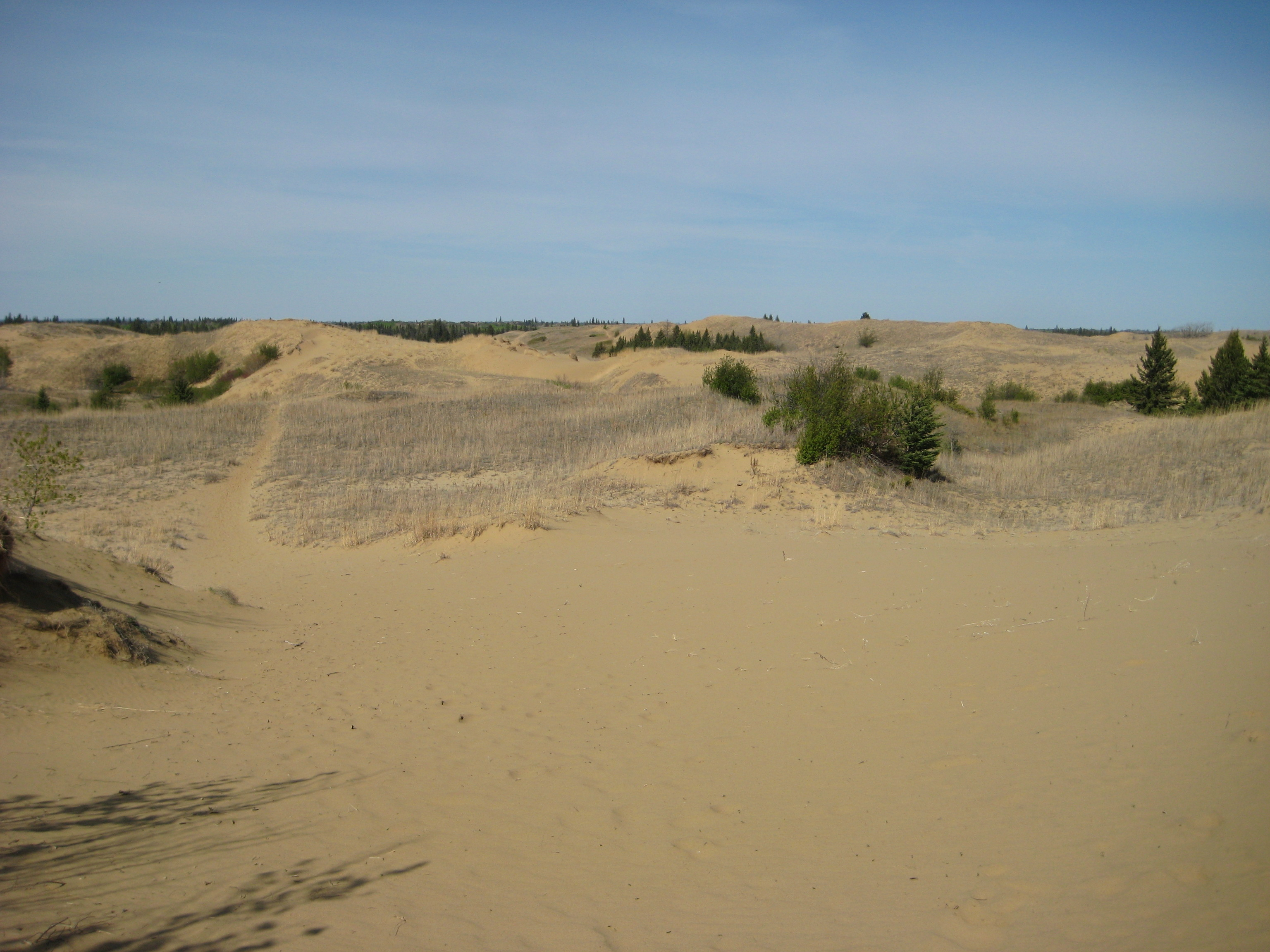
The sand dunes of the Spirit Sands in Spruce Woods Provincial Park

== Amenities ==
The Carberry Sandhills, or Spirit Sands is one of a very few areas of sand dunes in Canada. This region is not a true desert, but the remnant of a sandy delta of the Assiniboine River, from a time when it ran into glacial Lake Agassiz. The sandhills are home to many unique plants and animals; including some cacti and hognose snakes.

There are several hiking trails in the park open to day hikers, and backpackers can take the Newfoundland Trail for an overnight trip into the park. The Trans Canada Trail also passes through the Park.

Newfoundland Trail is a part of the Épinette Creek Trail System located within the park.

Beginning at a parking lot off PTH 5, the trail twists (38 km) through the hills to Jackfish Lake near the Assiniboine River. The trail is available year-round and is groomed during the Winter for cross-country skiers. Three enclosed shelters are available along the trail, each with bathroom, waterpump, indoor stove, axe and firewood. Alongside each shelter are picnic tables and space for several tents. A smaller hut at the trailhead is available but has no water pump. The trail is clearly marked at junctions and service road crossings to guide hikers.

Many cyclists enjoy riding on the Epinette Trail System each year. There are a series of loops that carve their way through unique terrain.

== See also ==
- List of protected areas of Manitoba
- Assiniboine River
- North West Company
