= Royal Canadian Artillery Museum =

- The logo of the RCA Museum

- The location of the RCA Museum within Manitoba
- Established: 1962
- Location: CFB Shilo, Near Brandon, Manitoba
- Coordinates: 49°48′04″N 99°38′17″W
- Type: Artillery museum
- Parking: On site
- Website: www.rcamuseum.com

The Royal Canadian Artillery Museum (RCA Museum), Canada's National Artillery Museum, is dedicated to telling the history of Canadian Gunners who have served Canada since 1855. The RCA Museum is the central museum for the Royal Regiment of Canadian Artillery (RCA).

The Canadian Army established the RCA Museum in 1962 at Canadian Forces Base Shilo.

The museum is a Manitoba Star Attraction and one of the largest military museums in Canada.

== Exhibits ==
The exhibition facility is 24,000 square feet, encompassing five major galleries with interactive exhibits and videos. The National Artillery Gallery is the largest exhibit, featuring 28 artillery pieces and vehicles.

Canadian military history is displayed in the Heritage Gallery, while the Weapons Vault displays almost 100 pistols and rifles. The Manitoba Gallery tells the story of 12,000 years of military history, and the Gunner Gallery commemorates 150 years of RCA history through military decorations and short bios.

The RCA Museum also features an outdoor Gun Park with over thirty artillery pieces and vehicles and runs two temporary exhibits yearly in the Gregg Gallery.

The museum is fully accessible to people with disabilities.

== History ==
After the Second World War, senior officers in the Canadian Artillery wanted a centralized museum to honour the service of the over 200,000 Canadian Gunners that served since 1855. However, it took roughly two decades to acquire the necessary approval to establish a Regimental Artillery Museum in Shilo, Manitoba.

Since the 1940s, Shilo was primarily a training base, headquarters for the RCA, and home of the Royal Canadian School of Artillery (RCSA). In the 1950s, Shilo had three thousand permanent residents, including military personnel and their families. In addition, the RCSA, local messes, and base headquarters had already collected thousands of artifacts.

In a letter dated 23 December 1954, Colonel A. J. B. Bailey, the Director of Artillery, Army Headquarters, Ottawa, wrote Colonel H. E. Brown stating that at the end of WW2, the Royal Regiment of Canadian Artillery established a significant memorial fund for Gunners that gave their lives during the Second World War. Colonel Bailey recommended using a portion of those funds annually to establish an "RCA Memorial Museum."

In June 1956, Colonel Brown requested allocation through Shilo Base Command of Building L1, the old RCA Officer's Mess, as a suitable location for a new centralized Artillery Museum. The Commander of Shilo Garrison, Colonel J. M. Houghton, approved the request but delayed any potential development of the RCA Museum until establishing a new mess. In 1961, Base Command changed and recommended a smaller building, a WW2 Roman Catholic Chapel, Building HP18, as the first location for the RCA Museum. The first building was small, with approximately 1,000 square feet of display space.

== Original Museum ==
On 11 January 1962, Army Headquarters in Ottawa approved the establishment of "The Central Museum of the Royal Regiment of Canadian Artillery," abbreviated "RCA Museum." However, in the original constitution documents from 1962, the official title was "Royal Canadian Artillery Museum," with the abbreviated name "RCA Museum."

On 26 January 1962, the Colonel Commandant of the Royal Regiment of Canadian Artillery, Brigadier P.A.S. Todd, officially opened the museum to the public. The original staff of five were all military personnel. The first curator of the RCA Museum, Major M. S. M. Ferguson. The original intent of the museum was to display the history of the RCA and the military history of Canada.

During the 1980s and 1990s, the museum had signage listing the full name as "The Royal Regiment of Canadian Artillery Museum" and the abbreviated "RCA Museum." In the early 2000s, staff added: "Canada's National Artillery Museum." The short title "RCA Museum" has never changed over the past sixty years.

The first location, the WW2 Roman Catholic Chapel, Building HP18, hosted the RCA Museum from 1961 to 1964.

== Museum Development ==
In 1964, staff moved the collection to Building C2, a small WW2 H-Hut, which provided more room for growth with approximately 2,000 square feet of display space. The RCA Museum stayed at Building C2 from 1964 to 1986 before moving to a larger building, the old Officer's Mess, Building A12. The Officer's Mess was 9,500 square feet, with half for exhibits.

During the 1980s, the RCA Museum expanded and acquired new collections, such as the Gregg Collection, containing forty WW2 vehicles and guns. In the late 1990s, base safety condemned the RCA Museum, Building A12, due to old age and water damage, which justified a more prominent location. By 2000, the RCA Museum had 30,000 artifacts, including an extensive collection of artillery and WW2 vehicles.

Regimental Headquarters, RCA, managed the museum until 2001, then transferred oversight to civilian personnel, with a Museum Director in charge, in line with Canadian Forces museum policy.

In 2001, Base Command approved renovating the old 1 RCHA Gun Park, Building N118, which included 18,000 square feet of display area and 5,500 square feet of storage. Museum staff acquired non-heated storage sheds at the former GATES Target Shop Complex, and the fourth version of the RCA Museum opened in 2004.

Base Command approved a sizeable, heated warehouse, Building M101, to store guns, vehicles, and artifacts beginning in 2009.
