= Rural Municipality of Oakland =

Rural municipality in Manitoba, Canada

Coordinates: 49°37′15″N 99°50′53″W

The Rural Municipality of Oakland is a former rural municipality (RM) in the Canadian province of Manitoba. It was originally incorporated as a rural municipality on December 22, 1883. It ceased on January 1, 2015, as a result of its provincially mandated amalgamation with the Village of Wawanesa to form the Municipality of Oakland – Wawanesa.

== Communities ==
- Bunclody
- Carroll
- Methven
- Nesbitt
- Rounthwaite

== Education ==
Stratherne School was established in November 1884. It moved in 1890 and, in 1950 it was replaced by a new school. The school was finally closed in 1962. In 1970 a cairn was erected to mark the site.
