= Manitoba Provincial Road 353 =

Provincial road in Manitoba, Canada

Provincial Road 353
- PR 353 highlighted in red

Route information
- Maintained by Department of Infrastructure
- Length: 34.4 km (21.4 mi)
- Existed: 1966–present

Major junctions
- East end: PTH 5 near Oberon
- PR 464 at Brookdale; PR 468 near Moore Park
- West end: PTH 10 near Forrest

Location
- Country: Canada
- Province: Manitoba
- Rural municipalities: Elton; North Cypress – Langford

Highway system
- Provincial highways in Manitoba; Winnipeg City Routes
← PR 352	→ PR 354

Provincial Road 353 (PR 353) is a 34.4-kilometre-long (21.4 mi) east-west highway in the Westman Region of the Canadian province of Manitoba.

== Route description ==
The route begins at PTH 5 near Oberon, and terminates at PTH 10.

PR 353 is an east–west highway providing access to the unincorporated communities of Brookdale and Moore Park. The road is generally quite straight and is paved for its entire length.

== History ==
In the early 1990s, the Manitoba government decommissioned a number of provincial secondary roads and returned the maintenance of these roads back to the rural municipalities. A large portion of the original PR 353 was included in this decommissioning.

Prior to this, PR 353 was more than twice its current length. It continued past its current eastbound terminus with PTH 5 (PR 258 prior to 1980) as a concurrence to the unincorporated community of Wellwood, where PR 353 continued east to meet PR 352. The two roads joined in a northwest concurrence to the unincorporated community of Edrans.

From Edrans, PR 353 continued east through the unincorporated community of Pine Creek Station to its terminus with PTH 34.

After decommissioning, maintenance of the former PR 353 was turned over to the Rural Municipalities of North Cypress and North Norfolk.

The original length of PR 353 was 77 kilometres (48 mi).

== Major intersections ==
Division	Location	km	mi	Destinations	Notes
Elton		0.0	0.0	PTH 10 (John Bracken Highway) – Brandon, Minnedosa	Western terminus; road continues west as Road 71N
Elton		9.9	6.2	PR 468 south – Justice	Northern terminus of PR 468
Elton		11.5	7.1	Moore Park Road (Road 101W) – Moore Park	Former PR 468 north
North Cypress-Langford	Brookdale	26.3	16.3	PR 464 – Brookdale	
North Cypress-Langford	Brookdale	26.9	16.7	Cypress Street – Brookdale	
North Cypress-Langford	Oberon	32.2	20.0	Rose Street – Oberon	
North Cypress-Langford		34.4	21.4	PTH 5 (Parks Route) – Neepawa, Carberry	Eastern terminus; road continues east as Road 71N
1.000 mi = 1.609 km; 1.000 km = 0.621 mi
