= Manitoba Highway 1A =

Highway in Manitoba

Provincial Trunk Highway 1A
- Saskatchewan Avenue (Portage la Prairie); Victoria Avenue and 1st Street (Brandon)

Route information
- Auxiliary route of PTH 1
- Maintained by Manitoba Infrastructure
- Existed: 1959–present

Portage la Prairie segment
- Length: 11.3 km (7.0 mi)
- West end: PTH 1 (TCH) / YH west of Portage la Prairie
- Major intersections: PR 240 north (Tupper Street N.); PR 240 south (5th Street S.E.)
- East end: PTH 1 (TCH) / YH east of Portage la Prairie

Brandon segment
- Length: 19.9 km (12.4 mi)
- West end: PTH 1 (TCH) near Kemnay
- Major intersections: PTH 10 (18th Street); PR 457 east (Veterans Way)
- East end: PTH 1 (TCH) / PTH 10 in Brandon

Location
- Country: Canada
- Province: Manitoba
- Rural municipalities: Cornwallis; Portage la Prairie; Whitehead
- Major cities: Brandon; Portage la Prairie

Highway system
- Provincial highways in Manitoba; Winnipeg City Routes
← PTH 1	→ PTH 2

Provincial Trunk Highway 1A (PTH 1A) is the name used for two provincial primary highways located in the Canadian province of Manitoba. One is located within the city of Portage la Prairie and the other, within and west of the city of Brandon.

== Portage la Prairie section ==
Provincial Trunk Highway 1A
- Location: Portage la Prairie
- Length: 11.3 km (7.0 mi)
- Existed: 1970–present

The section of PTH 1A at Portage la Prairie is also known as Saskatchewan Avenue and like most alternate spurs, it was the old route of PTH 1 until its current alignment was built. The highway is an alternate route that goes through Portage la Prairie. The highway in Portage la Prairie is 11.3 kilometres (7.0 mi) westbound and 10.7 kilometres (6.6 mi) eastbound. The speed limit is 50 km/h (31 mph) within city limits unless otherwise posted, becoming 90 km/h (56 mph) on both sides approaching PTH 1.

The highway received its current designation after the Portage la Prairie bypass was completed and opened to traffic in 1970.

Division	Location	km	mi	Destinations	Notes
Portage la Prairie		0.0	0.0	PTH 1 (TCH) / YH – Winnipeg, Brandon	Interchange; western terminus
City of Portage la Prairie		5.3	3.3	PR 240 north (Tupper Street N) – Delta Beach	Western end of PR 240 concurrency
City of Portage la Prairie		5.9	3.7	PR 240 south (5th Street SE) – Portage la Prairie/Southport Airport, Saint Claude	Eastern end of PR 240 concurrency
Portage la Prairie		11.3	7.0	PTH 1 (TCH) / YH – Brandon, Winnipeg	Interchange; eastern terminus
1.000 mi = 1.609 km; 1.000 km = 0.621 mi: Concurrency terminus

== Brandon section ==
Provincial Trunk Highway 1A
- Location: Kemnay - Brandon
- Length: 19.9 km (12.4 mi)
- Existed: 1959–present

This section serves Manitoba's second largest city, Brandon. As noted in the Portage la Prairie section, this was the original route for PTH 1 through Brandon prior to 1959.

PTH 1A is known as 1st Street north-south and Victoria Avenue east-west inside the city limits, and maintains an east-west designation for the entire route. The route is often used by trucks and buses to Brandon, as well as commuters and tourists and campers. The speed limit is mostly 50 km/h (31 mph) in the suburban area, and 100 km/h (62 mph) in the rural areas. The length of the highway is 19.9 kilometres (12.4 mi).

Large trucks travelling eastbound are not permitted to travel on the rural section of PTH 1A between Brandon and the Trans-Canada Highway near Kemnay due to a very low Canadian Pacific Railway bridge which passes over the highway just east of the small community; oversized trucks travelling westbound are rerouted on to a gravel road connecting PTH 1A and the Trans-Canada Highway less than 1 kilometre (0.62 mi) east of the underpass. Not only is the height of the bridge over the highway substandard with an overhead clearance of 3.67 metres (12 ft 0 in), there is no shoulder on either side of the highway. These factors make for a very tight entry into this area for both eastbound and westbound motorists. Despite the efforts of the Manitoba government to prevent oversized trucks from attempting to travel under this bridge (which include flashing overhead signs alerting overheight vehicles of the bridge and other signs directing these vehicles to either turn around and/or detour), there are still numerous incidents of trucks either crashing into the bridge or getting stuck in the opening, causing extended closures of the route. Eastbound traffic on the Trans-Canada Highway encounters a sign advising vehicles above the 3.7m limit requiring access to Brandon to continue traveling on PTH 1 approximately 2 kilometres (1.2 mi) before the junction.

The highway received its current designation when PTH 1 was configured around Brandon in 1959.

Division	Location	km	mi	Destinations	Notes
Whitehead	Kemnay	0.0	0.0	PTH 1 (TCH) – Regina, Winnipeg	Western terminus
Cornwallis	No major junctions				
City of Brandon		13.2	8.2	PTH 10 (18th Street / John Bracken Highway) – Boissevain, Downtown	
City of Brandon		15.6– 15.9	9.7– 9.9	Bridge over the Assiniboine River	
City of Brandon		17.4	10.8	PR 457 east (Veterans Way) – CFB Shilo	Western terminus of PR 457
City of Brandon		19.9	12.4	PTH 1 (TCH) / PTH 10 south – Regina, Winnipeg PTH 10 north (1st Street / John Bracken Highway) – Dauphin	Eastern terminus; road continues as PTH 10 north
1.000 mi = 1.609 km; 1.000 km = 0.621 mi
