= Australian Army Artillery Museum =

Museum in Sydney, Australia

- Australian Army Artillery Museum in Locator Map
- Dissolved: 19 December 2010
- Location: Sydney, Australia
- Coordinates: 33.8178°S 151.2958°E

The Australian Army Artillery Museum was an artillery museum located in North Fort, on the northern head of the entrance to Sydney Harbour, in Sydney, Australia.

It was formerly called the "National Artillery Museum", and had a large collection of the heritage and history of the Royal Australian Artillery. It was administered by the Army History Unit (AHU) with the assistance of volunteer members of the Royal Australian Artillery Historical Company(RAAHC).

== Collections ==
The museum displayed more than 50 guns and mortars and associated equipment, numerous paintings, displays, memorials, and medals. The Library has over 2,500 photographs, about 4,000 technical and historical books, and unique research material.

The collections covered the period from the first European Settlement (1788) to very recent operations.

== Facilities ==
The museum grounds included shaded picnic areas with barbecues, a Harbour Lookout Area (the Observation Platform), World War II fortifications and tunnels (listed in the Australian Commonwealth National Heritage list), and a Café that had extraordinary views of the entrance to Sydney Harbour and the channels to Bradleys Head and the Sydney central business district.

== Closure ==
On 19 December 2010 the museum closed and the collection moved into storage at Bandiana pending creation of a new army artillery museum at Puckapunyal army base in Victoria, the base the Artillery School had moved to in 1997, leaving the museum behind at North Head.

The move resulted from incompatible objectives of the Sydney Harbour Federation Trust as owner of the site and the Army History Unit who were responsible for the collection. The Sydney Harbour Federation Trust wanted the historic North Fort area to be open to the public seven days a week, in line with their objectives to maximise public access to the former defence lands around Sydney Harbour. They further insisted that if the area was not opened seven days a week then the army would have to pay rent to the trust. The Army refused, claiming that their funding levels only permitted the opening of the museum and North Fort area on weekends. The army also gave as a reason for the move that the purpose of their unit museums was to assist in the training of junior soldiers and that the artillery museum had been unable to serve this purpose at North Head, being nearly 1000 km away from the school at Puckapunyal.
