= Stockton, Manitoba =

Coordinates: 49.589°N 99.454°W

Location of Stockton in Manitoba

Stockton is a populated place within the Municipality of Glenboro – South Cypress, Manitoba, Canada. The Stockton United Church was built in 1891 and was in use until the late 1960s. Stockton's postal code is R0K 2E0.
