= Cottonwoods, Manitoba =

Cottonwoods
- Location of Cottonwoods in Manitoba
- Coordinates: 49°50′59″N 99°42′0″W
- Country: Canada
- Province: Manitoba
- Region: Westman
- Census Division: No. 7

Government
  - Governing Body: Rural Municipality of Cornwallis Council
  - MP: Grant Jackson
  - MLA: Colleen Robbins
- Time zone: UTC−6 (CST)
  - Summer (DST): UTC−5 (CDT)
- Area codes: 204, 431
- NTS Map: 062G13
- GNBC Code: GAFOR

Cottonwoods is an unincorporated community in southwestern Manitoba, Canada. It is located in the Rural Municipality of Cornwallis, approximately 18 kilometers (11 miles) east of Brandon.
