= Wawanesa Insurance =

Canadian mutual insurance firm

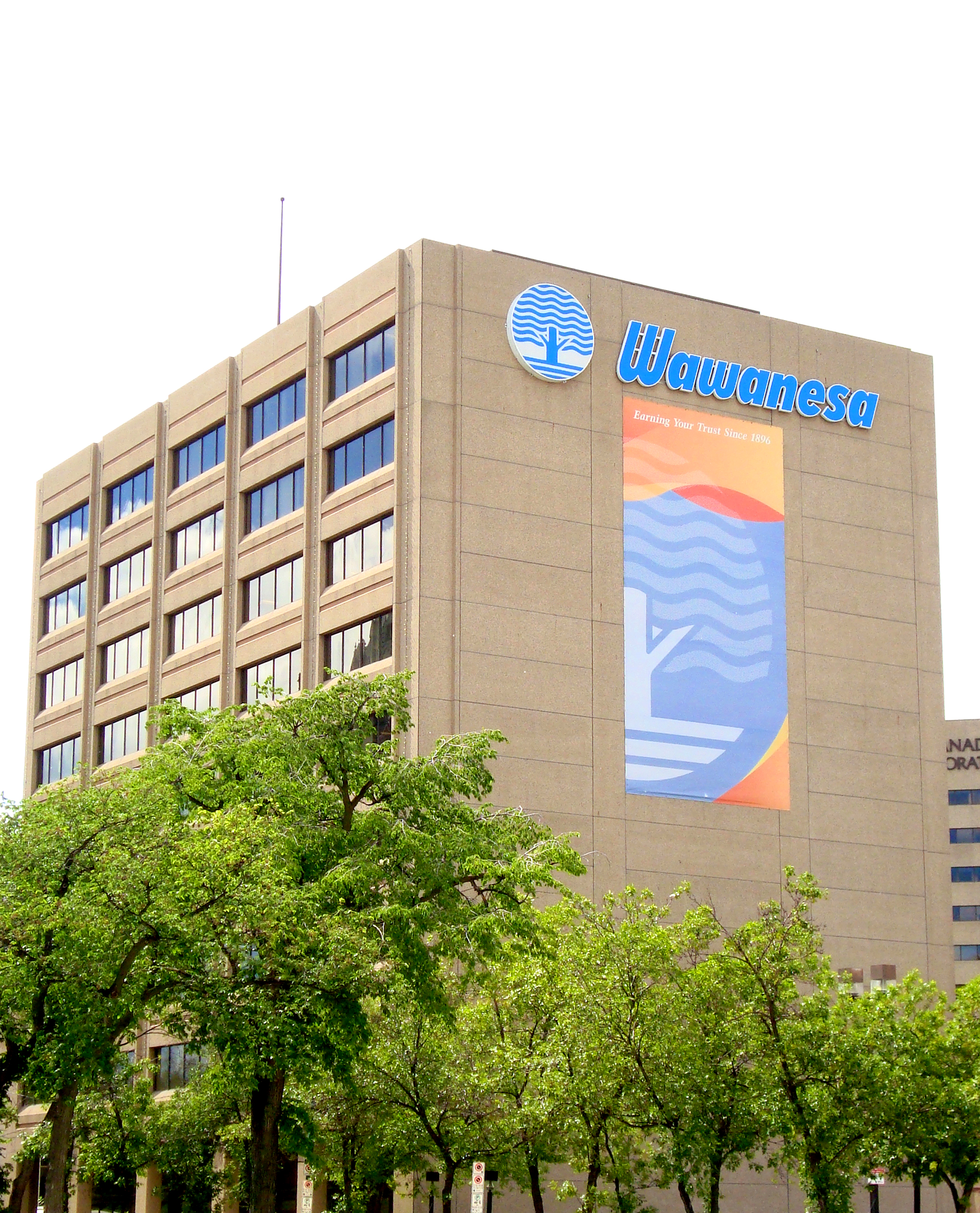
- The Wawanesa Insurance executive office building, located in Winnipeg, Manitoba.
- Type: Mutual
- Industry: General insurance
- Founded: September 25, 1896; 130 years ago, in Wawanesa, Manitoba
- Founder: Alonzo Fowler Kempton
- Headquarters: Winnipeg, Manitoba, Canada
- Area served: Canada
- Key people: Evan Johnston, President & CEO
- Services: Property insurance; Auto insurance; Life insurance
- Net income: ▲CA$556 million (2025)
- Total assets: ▲CA$12.5 billion (2025)
- Number of employees: 3,200 (2025)
- Subsidiaries: The Wawanesa Life Insurance Company; Wawanesa Specialty Insurance Company; Trimont Financial; Western Financial Group, Inc (through Trimont Financial)
- Website: wawanesa.com

Wawanesa Insurance—officially The Wawanesa Mutual Insurance Company, also known as Wawanesa Mutual or simply Wawanesa—is a Canadian mutual insurance firm, as well as among Canada's ten largest property and casualty insurers.

The company's head office is located in Wawanesa, Manitoba, with its executive office in Winnipeg and regional offices across Canada; it also previously operated in the US states of California and Oregon until April of 2024. As of 2020, it has assets of over $11.3 billion and over two million policies in force.

Wawanesa Insurance wholly owns two subsidiaries: Wawanesa Life, its life insurance subsidiary; and Trimont Financial Ltd., which provides direct support to local brokers. Wawanesa Insurance and its subsidiaries compose a corporate group called The Wawanesa Group of Companies.

== History ==
The Wawanesa Mutual Insurance Company was established on September 25, 1896, as a farmers' mutual insurance carrier in Wawanesa, Manitoba. It was founded by Alonzo Fowler Kempton, who started the company using money invested by local farmers. After two weeks, Charles Kerr, Alonzo's partner, completed the company's first policy, insuring a thresher for $600 at a premium of $24 for three years.

A small room was rented above a local drugstore. The staff consisted of Kempton as the secretary-manager, and Charles Kerr as the bookkeeper. Seven of the 20 original investors were named directors. Wawanesa issued its first policies without a premium payment because farmers did not have cash until after harvest.

In 1901, Wawanesa moved to a new building overlooking the Souris River valley, and the number of employees increased to five. By 1910, the company had become the largest mutual fire insurance company in the country. Several years later, the company diversified its coverage in 1926 to include private buildings, and in 1928 to automobiles.

The company was subsequently granted a Dominion charter on May 1, 1929, allowing it to offer coverage in all provinces of Canada.

During the Great Depression, Wawanesa expanded, fueled by large cash reserves and new offices in Vancouver, Toronto, Montreal, Winnipeg, and Moncton; however, the company was forced to cut director's salaries by 20 per cent, and on corporate visits, the company directors shared beds.

Wawanesa Mutual Life Insurance Company was introduced as a mutual company in 1961, and sold its first life insurance policy.

In 1975, Wawanesa's United States branch was established under the laws of California, making it the first Canadian general insurance company to successfully enter the US. The office was opened in San Diego in April that year.

On October 1, 1993, the Wawanesa Mutual Life Insurance Company was converted from a mutual company to a wholly owned stock subsidiary of the general insurance company, with its name changed to The Wawanesa Life Insurance Company.

In the year 2000, Wawanesa began offering automobile insurance in the US state of Oregon.

In 2016, Wawanesa Insurance signed a multi-year sponsorship deal with the Canadian Hockey League, Ontario Hockey League, and Quebec Major Junior Hockey League to become their Official Auto/Home Insurance Company.

On July 1, 2017, Wawanesa completed the purchase of Western Financial Group, Inc and Western Life Assurance from Desjardins Financial Corp via its subsidiary, Trimont Financial. Western Financial Group is a full service brokerage, serving most of Western and Northwestern Canada. Western Life Assurance was later rolled into The Wawanesa Life Insurance Company.

In 2020, Wawanesa opened a head office for the San Diego location, although they also write automobile policies in the state of Oregon. Also that year, Wawanesa opened a claims office in the state of Colorado.

In 2024, Wawanesa sold its US operations to the Automobile Club of Southern California to focus on the needs of its Canadian members.

In 2025, Former CEO Jeff Goy retired and a new leadership team was appointed, including a new CEO & President Evan Johnston, Chief Commercial Lines Officer Anna McCrindell and Chief Personal Lines Officer Kimberly Palatnick.

== Wawanesa life ==
The Wawanesa Life Insurance Company, or Wawanesa Life, is the life insurance arm of Wawanesa Insurance. It is licensed in all provinces of Canada, as well as in the Northwest Territories.

The company was introduced in 1961 as the Wawanesa Mutual Life Insurance Company, a mutual company. On October 1, 1993, the company was converted into a wholly owned stock subsidiary of Wawanesa Insurance, with its name changed to The Wawanesa Life Insurance Company.
