= Kemnay, Manitoba =

Kemnay
- Location within Manitoba
- Coordinates: 49°50′30″N 100°08′03″W
- Country: Canada
- Province: Manitoba
- Rural Municipality: Whitehead
- Area code: 204

Kemnay is a small community in Manitoba, Canada. It is located in the Rural Municipality of Whitehead about 10 kilometres west of Brandon on PTH 1A. Kemnay takes its name Kemnay, a village in Scotland.

In October 2001, most of the community was evacuated when a train carrying methanol and vinyl acetate derailed near Kemnay.
