= Sprucewoods =

Coordinates: 49°49′14″N 99°39′06″W

Sprucewoods is a community located at the North Gate of CFB Shilo and 20 km East of Brandon, MB on the #340 Highway. It is located in the Rural Municipality of Cornwallis.
