= Douglas, Manitoba =

Douglas
- Location of Douglas in Manitoba
- Coordinates: 49°53′36″N 99°42′38″W
- Country: Canada
- Province: Manitoba
- Region: Westman
- Census Division: No. 7

Government
  - Governing Body: Rural Municipality of Elton Council
  - MP: Grant Jackson
  - MLA: Colleen Robbins
- Time zone: UTC−6 (CST)
  - Summer (DST): UTC−5 (CDT)
- Postal Code: R0K 0R0
- Area code: 204
- NTS Map: 062G13
- GNBC Code: GAGUR

Douglas is a settlement in Manitoba. It is located in the Rural Municipality of Elton.
