= Norman Criddle =

- Born: 1875; Addlestone, Surrey, England
- Died: 1933 (aged 57–58); Winnipeg, Manitoba, Canada
- Years active: 1902–1933
- Known for: Agricultural Entomologist

Norman Criddle, born in 1875 in Addlestone, Surrey, England, died in 1933 in Winnipeg, Manitoba, Canada, was an entomologist active in the early development of control strategies for agriculturally important grasshoppers (Insecta: Orthoptera) in the prairie croplands of western North America, as well as a naturalist-artist.

== Career ==
In 1902, faced with food crop devastation from a peak in the population of grasshoppers, Criddle developed a mixture of pesticidal toxins called the "Criddle Mixture" to combat them, and was hired by the provincial government to demonstrate its use to farmers. In 1913 the Manitoba government hired him as an entomological field officer, and in 1919 he was appointed the provincial entomologist. Gifted with considerable artistic ability, Criddle illustrated a number of agricultural books; his and Dr. James Fletcher's Fodder and Pasture Plants and Farm Weeds of Canada are especially noteworthy.

== Education & Honors ==
Criddle was awarded an honorary diploma from the Manitoba Agricultural College, was honorary president of the Natural History Society of Manitoba from 1925 to 1933, and a member of the Manitoba Agricultural Hall of Fame. His family's homestead in Aweme, Manitoba, the Criddle/Vane Homestead, has been declared a Manitoba Provincial Heritage Park.

== Publications ==
Criddle authored and illustrated a number of works between 1906 and 1934.

- Criddle, Norman (1920). Locust control in the Prairie provinces. Ottawa: Division of Entomology.

== See also ==
List of entomologists
