= Criddle/Vane Homestead Provincial Park =

Provincial park in Manitoba, Canada

- IUCN category III (natural monument or feature)
- Location within Manitoba
- Location: Manitoba, Canada
- Nearest town: Brandon, Manitoba
- Coordinates: 49°42′31″N 99°36′15″W
- Area: 1.32 km^{2} (0.51 sq mi)
- Established: 2004
- Governing body: Government of Manitoba

Criddle/Vane Homestead Provincial Park was designated a provincial park by the Government of Manitoba in 2004. The park is 1.32 square kilometres (0.51 sq mi) in size. The park is considered to be a Class III protected area under the IUCN protected area management categories.

== Entomology ==
Aweme was the name given to their homestead and the surrounding region by the Criddle and Vane families. This region is the location of the longest continuous observation of insect activity and variety at a single area in Manitoba, much of it represented by voucher specimens in collections across North America. The most significant collections of this material are held by the Canadian National Collection of Insects, Arachnids and Nematodes (CNC) in Ottawa and the J.B. Wallis Museum of Entomology at the University of Manitoba in Winnipeg.

Norman Criddle was very familiar with the insects of the area and made sure that anything new or different was sent to the appropriate specialist for review. Several insect species are described based on specimens collected there.

Ephraim Porter Felt described the following species of gall midges based on specimens collected at Aweme in the first decade of the twentieth century.

- Rabdophaga rosacea
- Rabdophaga normaniana
- Rabdophaga racemi

A similar relationship with H.C. Fall resulted in the addition of new beetle taxa.

The Aweme borer moth (Papaipema aweme) was named in 1908 in honor of the entomological work done at the Criddle/Vane homestead.

== See also ==
- List of protected areas of Manitoba
- Norman Criddle
