= Ingelow, Manitoba =

Ingelow
- Unincorporated community
- Location within Manitoba Location within Canada
- Coordinates: 49°59′25″N 99°36′20″W
- Country: Canada
- Province: Manitoba
- Census Division: No. 7
- Municipality: North Cypress – Langford
- Time zone: UTC-6 (CST)
  - Summer (DST): UTC-5 (CDT)
- GNBC Code: GALNF

Ingelow is an unincorporated community in North Cypress – Langford, Manitoba, Canada. The settlement is located 30 kilometres (19 mi) northeast of Brandon.

== History ==
Originally called "Woodlea", settlers arrived in the area in the 1870s. The Woodlea School District was established in 1887, and Woodlea School opened in 1889. A post office opened in 1899, and remained open until 1970. Construction of a branch of the Grand Trunk Pacific Railway through Woodlea began in 1907. Each station name on the railway west of Portage la Prairie began with a consecutive letter of the alphabet, and Woodlea—located between "Harte" and "Justice" stations—was renamed "Ingelow", after English poet Jean Ingelow. The first train arrived in Ingelow in 1909.

The early settlement had a store, two grain elevators, an outdoor hockey rink, and a baseball and hockey team. A curling rink was built in 1939. St. Johns Presbyterian Church operated from 1909 to 1965, and a community hall operated from 1917 to 1977.

Woodlea School—renamed Ingelow School in 1923—remained open until 1960, when it consolidated with Brookdale Consolidated School No. 1299.

A cairn commemorating St. Johns Presbyterian Church and the community hall was unveiled at a ceremony in Ingelow in 1979.
