= Chater, Manitoba =

Unincorporated area in Manitoba, Canada

Coordinates: 49°52′02″N 99°49′53″W

Chater is an unincorporated area in the Rural Municipality of Cornwallis in the Canadian province of Manitoba.

It is located near Brandon, Manitoba.
