= Glenboro =

Community in Manitoba, Canada

- Location in Manitoba
- Coordinates: 49°33′21″N 99°17′28″W
- Country: Canada
- Province: Manitoba
- Region: Westman
- Incorporated: 1950
- Dissolved: 2015

Government
  - MLA Spruce Woods: Colleen Robbins
  - MP Brandon-Souris: Grant Jackson (CON)

Population (2021)
  - Total: 1,123
  - Density: 1/km^{2} (2.6/sq mi)
- Time zone: UTC-6 (Central (CST))
  - Summer (DST): UTC-5 (Central (CDT))
- Postal code: R0K
- Area code: 204
- Highways: PTH 2 / PTH 5
- Website: www.glenboro.com

Glenboro is an unincorporated rural community in the Municipality of Glenboro – South Cypress within the Canadian province of Manitoba that held village status prior to January 1, 2015. it is located about 80 km southeast of the City of Brandon. In the 2021 census it had a population of 1,123. The community is a service centre for the surrounding farming community.

Glenboro is the home of "Sara the camel", a 17′ statue created in October 1978, by Mr. George Barone of Barone Sculptures in Winnipeg. "Sara" is emblematic of the nearby Spirit Sands, and has been used to promote the Glenboro area and nearby Spruce Woods Provincial Park.

== History ==
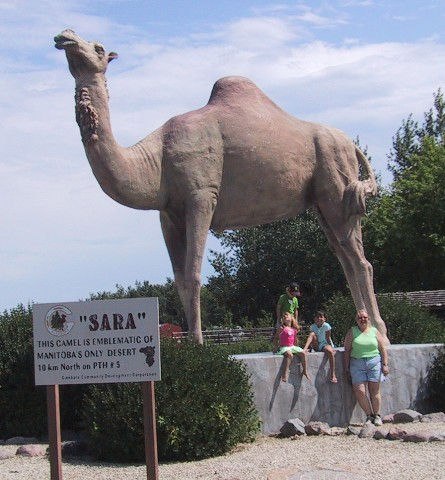
Sara the Camel, Glenboro, Manitoba

The Glenboro area was visited early in western exploration, possibly as early as the 1730s when the La Verendryes travelled to the Missouri and beyond. History records that the explorer and geographer David Thompson passed through the area in 1798 and made note of the quality of soil. The first permanent European settlers of the area (Jonas Christie and James Duncan) arrived in 1879, and after the federal Homestead Act passed in 1880, many more settlers arrived in the area, including a number of Icelandic settlers between 1889 and 1894. The arrival of the CPR in 1886 prompted Christie and Duncan to offer land for a town site. The Queens Hotel was the first permanent building of the community, constructed in 1881, and survives into the 21st century. In 1950 the community was formally incorporated as a village.

Steam riverboats were in use on the Assiniboine River between 1875 and 1885. The bow timbers of the last of this "prairie navy" are preserved in a park in Glenboro. The SS Alpha ran aground on April 27, 1885. By this time the advent of the railway had displaced riverboats for transport of passengers, HBC trade goods, agricultural supplies, and grain between Southern Manitoba communities and larger centers such as Winnipeg. A 1904 water tower was installed for watering steam locomotives. The tower was declared both a federal and a provincial heritage site in September 1996. One of the few remaining water towers in Canada, it was destroyed by fire in the early morning hours of April 4, 2008. The community was connected to the Manitoba electrical grid in 1927, and is the northern terminus of a 260 km, 230 kV electrical transmission line to Harvey, North Dakota.

== Demographics ==
In the 2021 Census of Population conducted by Statistics Canada, Glenboro had a population of 544 living in 251 of its 275 total private dwellings, a change of −12.8% from its 2016 population of 624. With a land area of 2.69 km^{2} (1.04 sq mi), it had a population density of 202.2/km^{2} (523.8/sq mi) in 2021.

== Economy ==
The community provides services to the surrounding farms such as a farm equipment dealers and agricultural suppliers. Tourism is a secondary source of income, due to the nearby Spruce Woods Provincial Park and the Glenboro Golf and Country Club.

== Climate ==
Climate data for Glenboro
Month	Jan	Feb	Mar	Apr	May	Jun	Jul	Aug	Sep	Oct	Nov	Dec	Year
Record high °C (°F)	7.2 (45.0)	14 (57)	18.9 (66.0)	36.5 (97.7)	37 (99)	36.7 (98.1)	36.1 (97.0)	39.5 (103.1)	38.3 (100.9)	28.5 (83.3)	22.8 (73.0)	9.5 (49.1)	39.5 (103.1)
Mean daily maximum °C (°F)	−10.9 (12.4)	−7.5 (18.5)	−0.4 (31.3)	10.6 (51.1)	19.5 (67.1)	23.6 (74.5)	26 (79)	25.1 (77.2)	18.5 (65.3)	11.4 (52.5)	0 (32)	−9 (16)	8.9 (48.0)
Daily mean °C (°F)	−16.6 (2.1)	−13 (9)	−5.7 (21.7)	4.4 (39.9)	12.3 (54.1)	16.9 (62.4)	19.2 (66.6)	18 (64)	12 (54)	5.4 (41.7)	−4.9 (23.2)	−14.2 (6.4)	2.8 (37.0)
Mean daily minimum °C (°F)	−22.2 (−8.0)	−18.6 (−1.5)	−11 (12)	−1.9 (28.6)	5.1 (41.2)	10.2 (50.4)	12.3 (54.1)	10.8 (51.4)	5.5 (41.9)	−0.7 (30.7)	−9.7 (14.5)	−19.3 (−2.7)	−3.3 (26.1)
Record low °C (°F)	−41 (−42)	−42.8 (−45.0)	−37.2 (−35.0)	−29.4 (−20.9)	−11 (12)	−1.1 (30.0)	1.5 (34.7)	−2.5 (27.5)	−7 (19)	−25.5 (−13.9)	−38 (−36)	−40 (−40)	−42.8 (−45.0)
Average precipitation mm (inches)	19.1 (0.75)	15.5 (0.61)	21.7 (0.85)	36 (1.4)	55.9 (2.20)	75.9 (2.99)	76.8 (3.02)	70.2 (2.76)	51.3 (2.02)	33.3 (1.31)	17.6 (0.69)	17.8 (0.70)	491 (19.3)
Source: Environment Canada

== Amenities ==
- Eleven-bed hospital
- Glenboro has had a 9-hole golf course since 1922, with all grass greens since 1970 and with a new clubhouse constructed in 1987. Nine more holes were later added.
- Glenboro Airport is a nearby unpaved airfield suitable for light aircraft.
- Glenboro School is a kindergarten to Grade 12 school, currently with around 230 pupils and 17 staff, and has offered high school courses since 1973.
- The CFB Shilo is nearby
- Museum
- Sara the Camel has stood at the side of Highway No. 2 since 1978, in tribute to the nearby Manitoba Desert.

== Notable people ==
- Oscar Bjornson, Manitoba politician
- James Christie, Manitoba politician
- Henry Einarson, Manitoba politician
- Ab Gowanlock, McDonald Brier Canadian national curling champion 1938 and 1953
- John Harvard, journalist, politician, and Lieutenant Governor of Manitoba
- Konrad Johannesson, pioneering aviator, instrumental in flight training and airport administration as well as ice hockey player on the Winnipeg Falcons, the Gold medal-winning team in the 1920 Summer Olympics
- Charlotte Oleson, Manitoba politician
- Scott Young, journalist, sports reporter, radio and television broadcaster, served during the Second World War in the Canadian Navy
