= Colleen Robbins =

Canadian politician

Colleen Robbins MLA

Member of the Legislative Assembly of Manitoba for Spruce Woods
- Incumbent
- Assumed office August 26, 2025
- Preceded by: Grant Jackson

Personal details
- Born: August 7, 1964 (age 62) Deloraine, Manitoba, Canada
- Party: Progressive Conservative
- Education: Assiniboine College

Colleen Robbins is a Canadian politician, who was elected to the Manitoba Legislative Assembly in a by-election on August 26, 2025. She represents the electoral district of Spruce Woods as a member of the Progressive Conservative Party of Manitoba (PCs). She formerly served as their regional director for southwestern Manitoba.

== Electoral record ==
Manitoba provincial by-election, August 26, 2025: Spruce Woods Resignation of Grant Jackson
** Preliminary results — Not yet official **
Party	Candidate	Votes	%	±%	Expenditures
Progressive Conservative	Colleen Robbins	2,805	46.88	-14.93	
New Democratic	Ray Berthelette	2,735	45.71	+21.71	
Liberal	Stephen Reid	444	7.42	-6.77	
Total valid votes/expense limit		5,984	99.60	–	
Total rejected and declined ballots		24	0.40	-0.38	
Turnout		6,008	40.71	-15.83	
Eligible voters		14,757			
Progressive Conservative hold		Swing		-18.32	
