= Municipality of Glenboro-South Cypress =

Rural municipality in Manitoba, Canada

Glenboro – South Cypress
- Rural municipality
- Municipality of Glenboro – South Cypress
- Location of Glenboro – South Cypress in Manitoba
- Coordinates: 49.555°N 99.300°W
- Country: Canada
- Province: Manitoba
- Region: Westman
- Incorporated (amalgamated): January 1, 2015

Area
  - Total: 1,099.05 km^{2} (424.35 sq mi)

Population (2021)
  - Total: 1,123
  - Density: 1.022/km^{2} (2.646/sq mi)
- Time zone: UTC-6 (CST)
  - Summer (DST): UTC-5 (CDT)
- Website: www.glenboro.com

The Municipality of Glenboro – South Cypress is a rural municipality (RM) in the Canadian province of Manitoba.

== History ==
The RM was incorporated on January 1, 2015 via the amalgamation of the RM of South Cypress and the Village of Glenboro. It was formed as a requirement of The Municipal Amalgamations Act, which required that municipalities with a population less than 1,000 amalgamate with one or more neighbouring municipalities by 2015. The Government of Manitoba initiated these amalgamations in order for municipalities to meet the 1997 minimum population requirement of 1,000 to incorporate a municipality.

== Communities ==
- Glenboro
- Treesbank

== Demographics ==
In the 2021 Census of Population conducted by Statistics Canada, Glenboro-South Cypress had a population of 1,123 living in 440 of its 484 total private dwellings, a change of −27.5% from its 2016 population of 1,550. With a land area of 1,071.64 km^{2} (413.76 sq mi), it had a population density of 1.0/km^{2} (2.7/sq mi) in 2021.

== Attractions ==
- Spruce Woods Provincial Forest
- Spruce Woods Provincial Park

== See also ==
- CFB Shilo
