= Treesbank =

Settlement in Manitoba, Canada

Coordinates: 49°38′10″N 99°36′34″W

Location of Treesbank in Manitoba

Treesbank is a settlement in the Canadian province of Manitoba. It is located in the Municipality of Glenboro – South Cypress. The Souris River meets and combines with the Assiniboine River at Treesbank.
