= Municipality of Oakland-Wawanesa =

Rural municipality in Manitoba, Canada

Oakland – Wawanesa
- Rural municipality
- Municipality of Oakland – Wawanesa
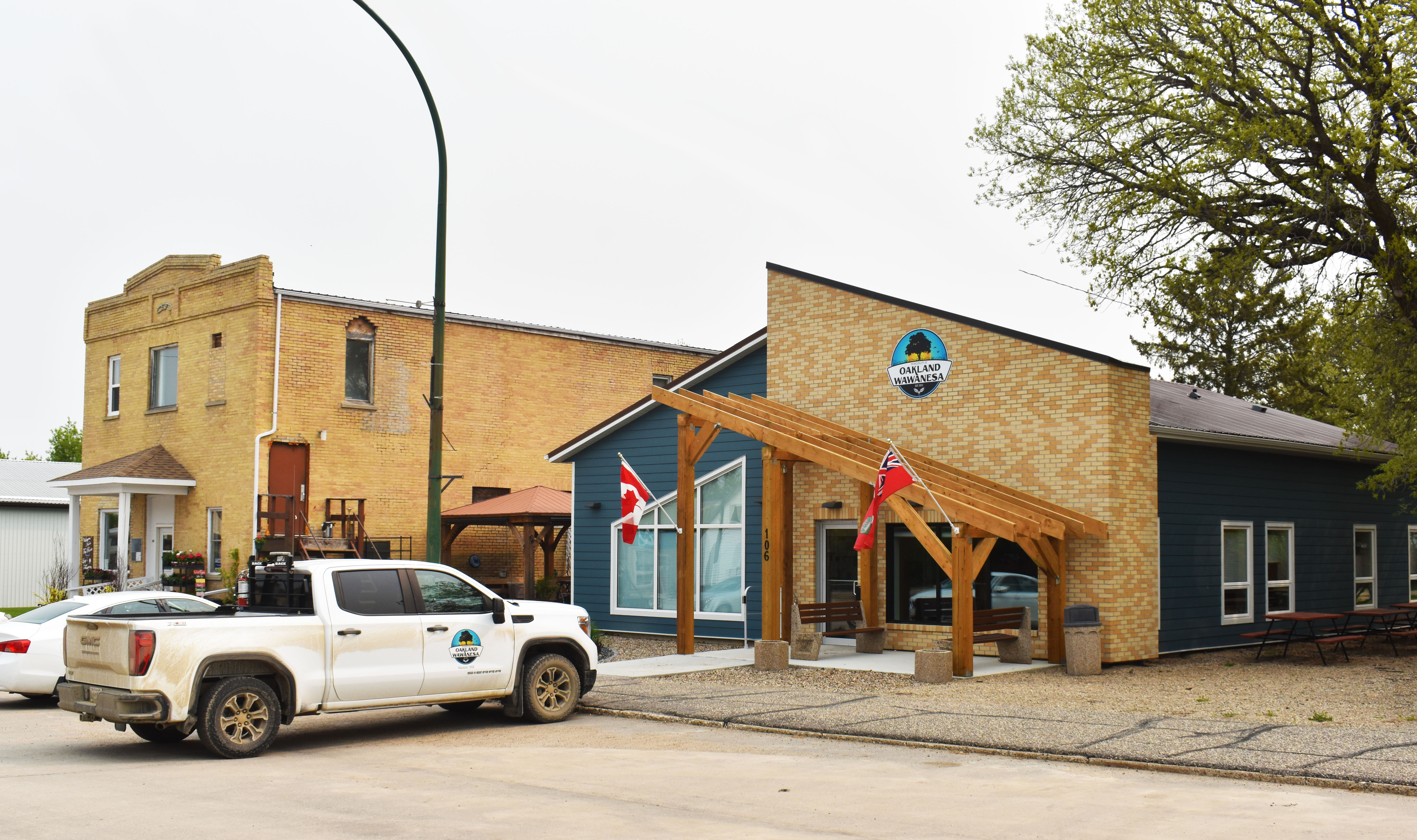
- Administration building for the Municipality of Oakland - Wawanesa in Wawanesa.

- Location of the RM of Oakland-Wawanesa in Manitoba
- Coordinates: 49°37′15″N 99°50′53″W
- Country: Canada
- Province: Manitoba
- Region: Westman
- Incorporated (amalgamated): January 1, 2015

Area
  - Total: 578.82 km^{2} (223.48 sq mi)

Population (2021)
  - Total: 1,758
  - Density: 3.037/km^{2} (7.866/sq mi)
- Time zone: UTC-6 (CST)
  - Summer (DST): UTC-5 (CDT)
- Website: oakland-wawanesa.ca

The Municipality of Oakland – Wawanesa is a rural municipality (RM) in the Canadian province of Manitoba.

== History ==
The RM was incorporated on January 1, 2015 via the amalgamation of the RM of Oakland and the Village of Wawanesa. It was formed as a requirement of The Municipal Amalgamations Act, which required that municipalities with a population less than 1,000 amalgamate with one or more neighbouring municipalities by 2015. The Government of Manitoba initiated these amalgamations in order for municipalities to meet the 1997 minimum population requirement of 1,000 to incorporate a municipality.

== Communities ==
- Bunclody
- Carroll
- Methven
- Nesbitt
- Rounthwaite
- Wawanesa

== Demographics ==
In the 2021 Census of Population conducted by Statistics Canada, Oakland-Wawanesa had a population of 1,758 living in 625 of its 670 total private dwellings, a change of 4% from its 2016 population of 1,690. With a land area of 578.82 km^{2} (223.48 sq mi), it had a population density of 3.0/km^{2} (7.9/sq mi) in 2021.
