= Rural Municipality of Cornwallis =

Rural municipality in Manitoba, Canada

Cornwallis
- Rural municipality
- Rural Municipality of Cornwallis
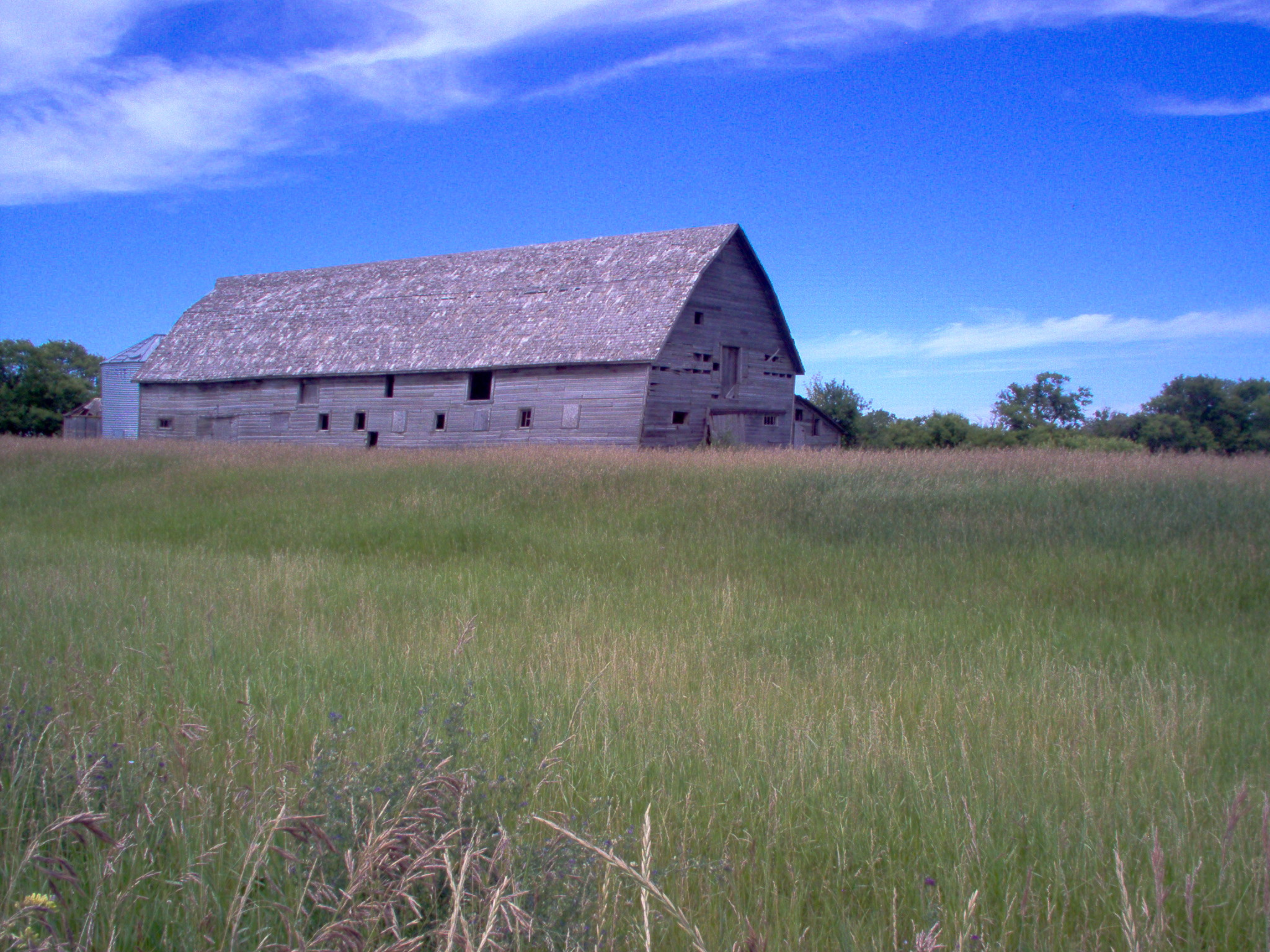
- An old barn on Provincial Road 349 just south of the city of Brandon, Manitoba.

- Location of Cornwallis in Manitoba
- Coordinates: 49°47′53″N 99°50′53″W
- Country: Canada
- Province: Manitoba
- Region: Westman
- Incorporated: December 22, 1883

Area
  - Total: 500.36 km^{2} (193.19 sq mi)

Population (2021)
  - Total: 4,568
  - Density: 9.129/km^{2} (23.65/sq mi)
- Time zone: UTC-6 (CST)
  - Summer (DST): UTC-5 (CDT)
- Website: www.gov.cornwallis.mb.ca

Cornwallis is a rural municipality located in the Canadian province of Manitoba. It surrounds the east, south and west sides of Brandon, Manitoba. Most of the land comprising the municipality is farmland, but it contains a few settlements. One of the larger settlements, Sprucewoods, sits at the north gate of Canadian Forces Base Shilo and contains a large portion of the municipal population. In the past, there has been friction between the community and the farming base that make up much of Cornwallis.

The municipality is divided into two wards, each represented by two councillors. The council is made up of the four councillors and the reeve, or head of council.

== Communities ==
- Chater
- Cottonwoods
- Sprucewoods
- Roseland

== Demographics ==
In the 2021 Census of Population conducted by Statistics Canada, Cornwallis had a population of 4,568 living in 1,704 of its 1,850 total private dwellings, a change of 1.4% from its 2016 population of 4,506. With a land area of 500.51 km^{2} (193.25 sq mi), it had a population density of 9.1/km^{2} (23.6/sq mi) in 2021.

== See also ==
- List of francophone communities in Manitoba
