= Wawanesa, Manitoba =

Wawanesa
- Unincorporated urban community
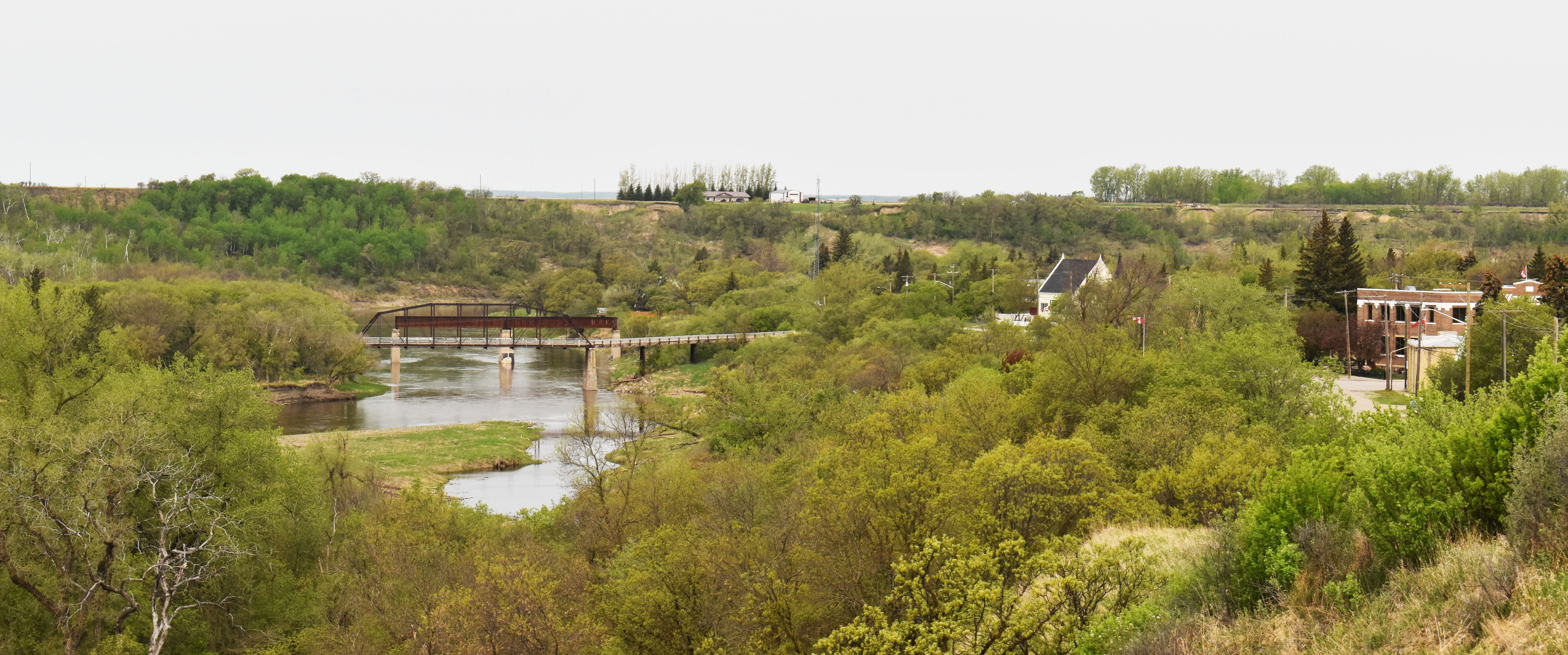
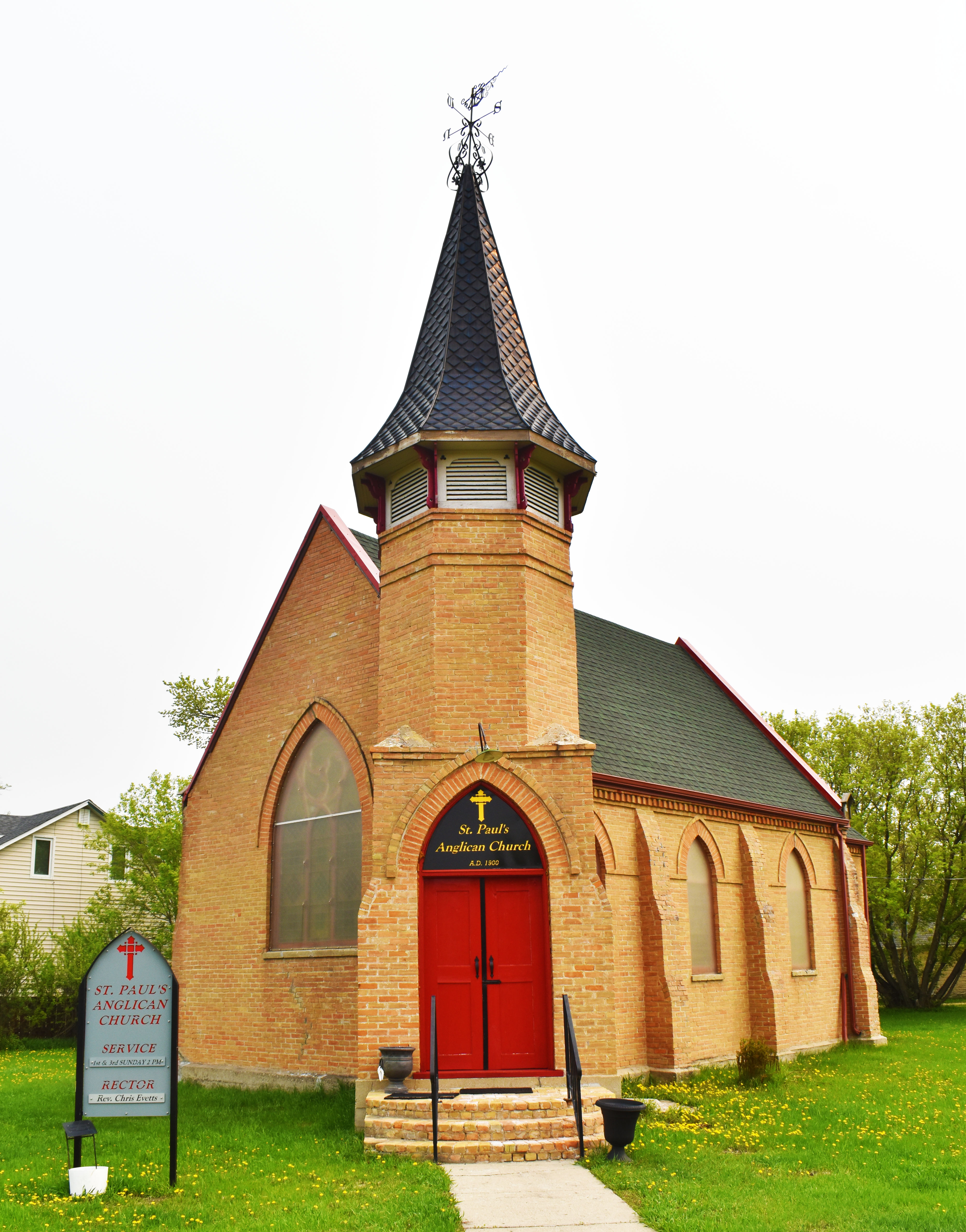
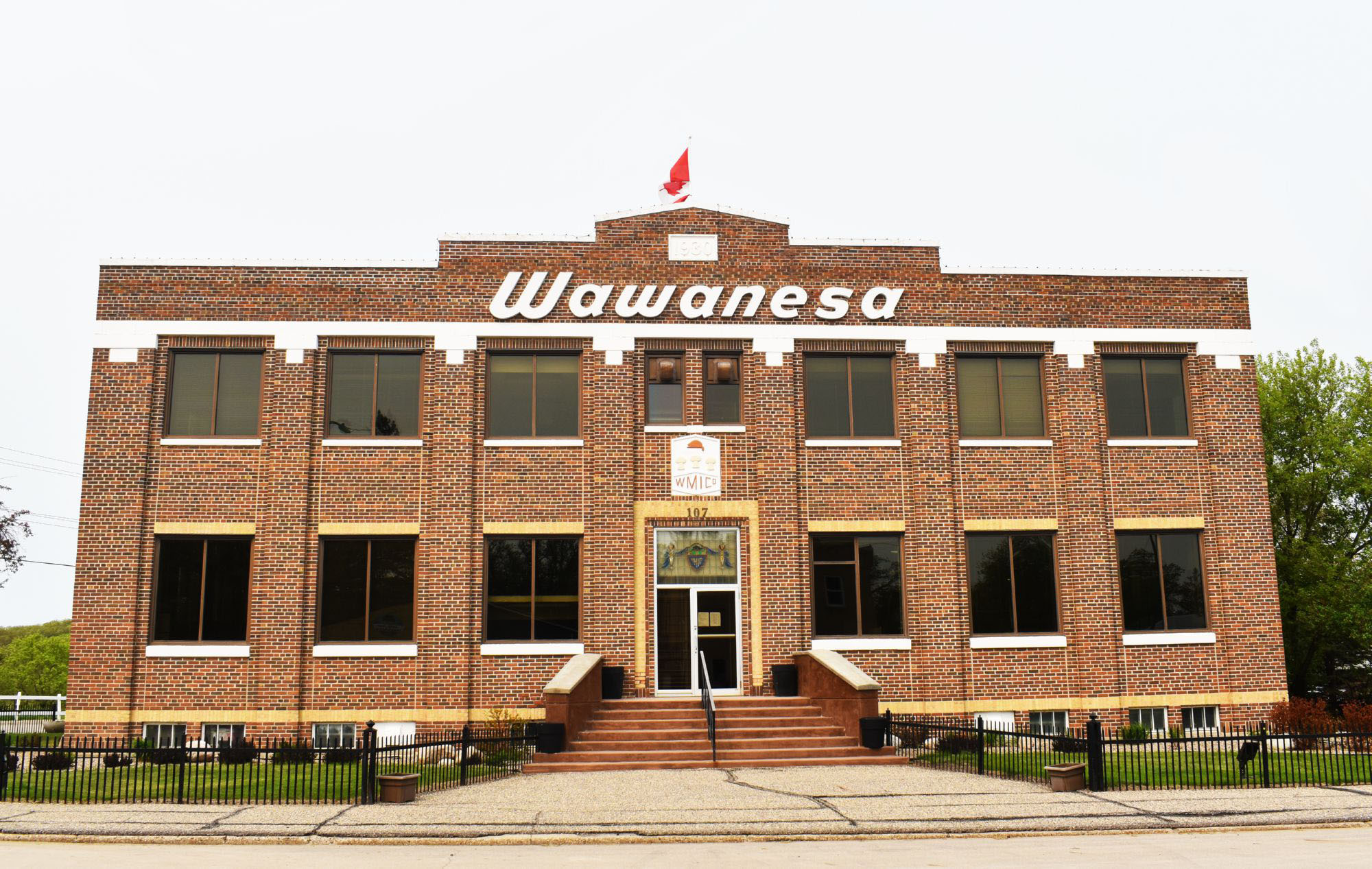
- A view of the skyline of Wawanesa. St. Paul's Anglican Church in Wawanesa, built in 1900. Wawanesa Mutual Insurance Company building, built in 1930.
- Motto: Our scenic valley
- Location of Wawanesa in Manitoba
- Coordinates: 49°36′N 99°41′W
- Country: Canada
- Province: Manitoba
- Region: Westman Region
- Municipality: Oakland – Wawanesa
- Established: 1889
- Incorporated: 1908 (village)
- Amalgamated into Oakland – Wawanesa: 2015

Area
  - Total: 2.28 km^{2} (0.88 sq mi)

Population (2021)
  - Total: 653
  - Density: 261.1/km^{2} (676/sq mi)
- Time zone: UTC-6 (Central (CST))
  - Summer (DST): UTC-5 (Central (CDT))
- Area code: 204

Wawanesa is an unincorporated urban community in the Municipality of Oakland – Wawanesa within the Canadian province of Manitoba that held village status before January 1, 2015. It is the birthplace and namesake of The Wawanesa Mutual Insurance Company.

== Etymology ==
Wawanesa is the second name for the community which was originally called Sipewiski, an Indigenous word meaning "crooked river" or "light through the trees". This name was changed by clerics in the region in 1890 during the temperance movement after it was believed to mean or sound like "sip of whisky". Following this, the community's name was changed to Wawanesa, which has various meanings depending on which Indigenous language is used a source for the name. The first thought is that the name is considered to come from the Ojibwa word waa’oonesii, which means 'whippoorwill'. A second understanding is that the name comes from the Cree words for 'goose nest' as wawa means 'goose' and nesa means nest. A third explanation for the name comes from the Dakota-Sioux words wa-wa-neche which means 'land of no snow', thought to come from the cliffs which appear snow free throughout the winter.

== History ==
The first peoples use and live in the land in and around Wawanesa were the Cree, Sioux, Blackfoot, and Lakota. Indigenous peoples would use the Souris River as a trade and passage route moving up and down the waterway and trading with the Mandan further south, who were an agricultural and trading peoples. They would trade bison meat for corn and this practice led to the development of pemmican which had corn added to minced bison meat. This stable food supply helped Indigenous and later on the first European explorers to sustain themselves on this open land. Noted explorer David Thompson may have been the first European to arrive or see the land when he travelled the Souris River in 1797. His diaries cite a place where they camped on the Souris to secure supplies and continue the expedition and this campsite was supposedly the site of present day Wawanesa. Furs and pemmican were a key source of trade for early European arrivals and in 1797 Ronald Cameron set up a trading post at the confluence of the Souris and Assiniboine Rivers and would gradually begin the great settlement which was to come.

The first pioneers in the area arrived in 1878 when a small settlement was established on the west side of the Souris River and Assiniboine River confluence where a land claims title was set up near to where the trading fort had been established. The site included a post office which was named Souris Mouth though this settlement did not remain long as it was only temporary and meant for homestead registration and not as a settlement. Five years later another post office was set up at Sourisbourg, a community which is located near the present site of the Methven Cemetery, though this community too would not last. Other settlements sprung up in the area including Millford and Souris City which by the 1880s seemed to be thriving towns. However, as with many early prairie settlements, when the bids for railways did not happen these communities quickly faded away. The Northern Pacific Railway instead built its line to Wawanesa, thus dooming Souris City and many of the latter's buildings were moved by ice on the Souris River to the site of Wawanesa.

Wawanesa was established in August 1889 when the Story family left Lanark, Ontario for the northwest by rail and then packed all their belongings on one wagon in Glenboro and travelled west. When Mrs. J. J. Story saw the panorama of Wawanesa it is said that she told her husband "Oh J.J. let's stay here. We will never find a more beautiful spot. And I am sure that there will be plenty of families [sic] soon move in and settle here." J.J. Story persuaded Joe Ferris from Glenboro, 20 miles (32 km) away to come to the site and help construct a building which was the first such built at Wawanesa and thus established the community. The Story home served as both a residence but they also operated a general store from the building, starting the growth of businesses along Main Street. More and more businesses were established and by 1900 the provincial archives showed 37 businesses that were established in the community.

A flour mill was established in the community in 1895 after the nearby community of Methven did not want it established in their small town for fears of unsavoury working men coming to the community. The mill was then established in Wawanesa which proved to be a real boon to the community and helped build the economy and flour and grains were shipped from the area around the country and world. In 1896, village resident A.F. Kempton came up with the idea to start an insurance company owned and operated by farmers and who needed insurance for their threshing operations. Running the numbers, the business plan seemed doable and Kempton opened the company on the second floor of the drug store. This company that was named Wawanesa Insurance would go on to grow to become one of the largest insurance companies in Canada.

As the community continued to grow other buildings and facilities necessary for an established community appeared in the village. The first church was a methodist church built at the corner of Fifth Street and Cliff Street. In 1890 a framed school building was built and in 1895 the Wawanesa Elementary School was built on the same site. More churches were established including the St. Paul's Anglican Church built in 1900.

The community continued to grow and in 1909 the community was incorporated as a village. There was some suspicion around this as to be a village at the time a community had to have a population of 500 which Wawanesa did not. The railway was building a new bridge in the area and a number of workers had been stationed in Wawanesa at the time and the community gave them resident status which allowed it to meet the threshold of 500 people. The village's population would struggle to meet this bar until almost 50 years later in the 1960s.

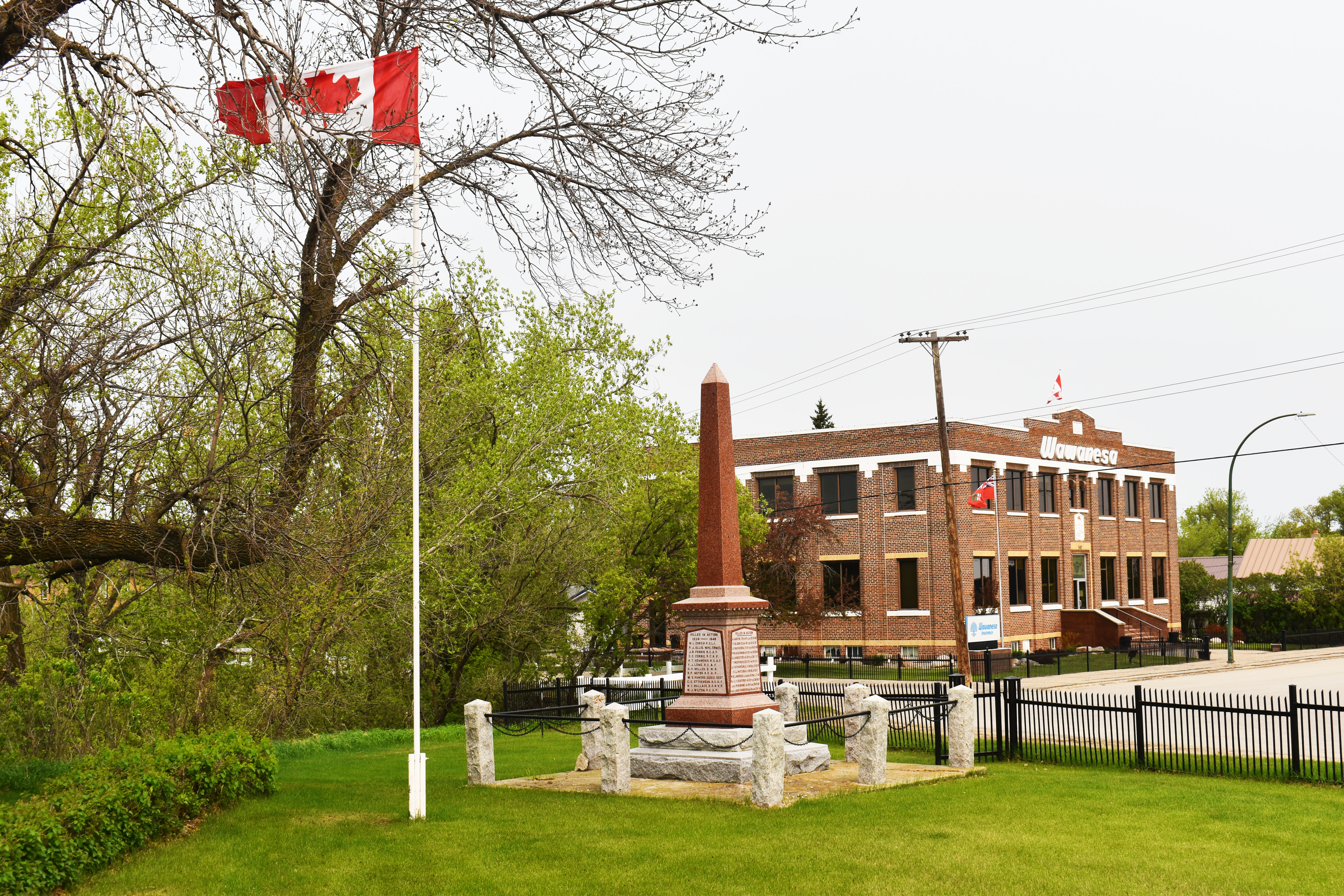
The war cenotaph in Wawanesa along Cliff Street.

Like many Commonwealth countries and towns and cities across Canada the village of Wawanesa was greatly affected by the great wars. During World War I 189 men in the village and area enlisted into the military and 47 were killed. When World War II began, the men and women of the area again answered the calls for help from their country. During this war, 220 people from the district signed up to enlist and 14 were killed and did not return to the valley. A war memorial was established in the community and a cenotaph erected along Cliff Street with their names.

The Wawanesa Insurance company continued to grow and a large new company building was constructed in the community in 1930. The flour mill burned down in 1949 after many years of serving the community and transporting goods across the nation. In 1954 an article ran in Canada's national magazine titled "The One-Horse Town That Spawned a Giant" telling the story of Wawanesa Insurance and spreading the name of the village as far away as New Zealand and Australia. A second story about the community was written in 1955 titled Cave in 55 but was not as widely circulated. When the Manitoba government ran a commission on the auto insurance industry in 1969 the community rallied large marches to protest what they saw as a threat against the community's economic future.

In modern times, flooding has been a threat to the community which saw devastating effects in 1976 when a 100-year flood affected the community and buildings in low laying areas. The 2011 Souris River flood was of an even greater magnitude and affected the community cresting there on July 6.

== Demographics ==
Population growth

Year	Pop.	±%
1911	375	—
1916	343	−8.5%
1921	368	+7.3%
1926	374	+1.6%
1931	441	+17.9%
1936	427	−3.2%
1941	404	−5.4%
1946	423	+4.7%
1951	447	+5.7%
1956	440	−1.6%
1961	456	+3.6%
1966	512	+12.3%

Year	Pop.	±%
1971	478	−6.6%
1976	487	+1.9%
1981	492	+1.0%
1986	502	+2.0%
1991	482	−4.0%
1996	485	+0.6%
2001	516	+6.4%
2006	535	+3.7%
2011	562	+5.0%
2016	594	+5.7%
2021	653	+9.9%

In the 2021 Census of Population conducted by Statistics Canada, Wawanesa had a population of 653 living in 254 of its 266 total private dwellings, a change of 9.9% from its 2016 population of 594. With a land area of 2.04 km^{2} (0.79 sq mi), it had a population density of 320.1/km^{2} (829.1/sq mi) in 2021.

In 2016, of those in Wawanesa aged 15 or older, 57.4% are married, 7.4% are living with a common-law partner, 18.0% have never been married, 2.1% are separated, 6.4% are divorced, and 8.5% are widowed.

Of the census families in Wawanesa, 52.9% consist of two persons, 11.8% consist of three persons, 20.6% consist of four persons, and the remaining 11.8% consist of five or more persons. The average size of a census family in Wawanesa is 2.9 persons. 53.3% of couple census families live without children, 10.0% live with one child, 23.3% live with two children, and 13.3% live with three or more children.

== Notable people ==
Notable people associated with Wawanesa have included suffragist Nellie McClung and Edna Diefenbaker, the first wife of Prime Minister John Diefenbaker.
