= CFB Shilo =

Canadian Forces base in Manitoba

CFB Shilo Shilo (Flewin Field) Heliport
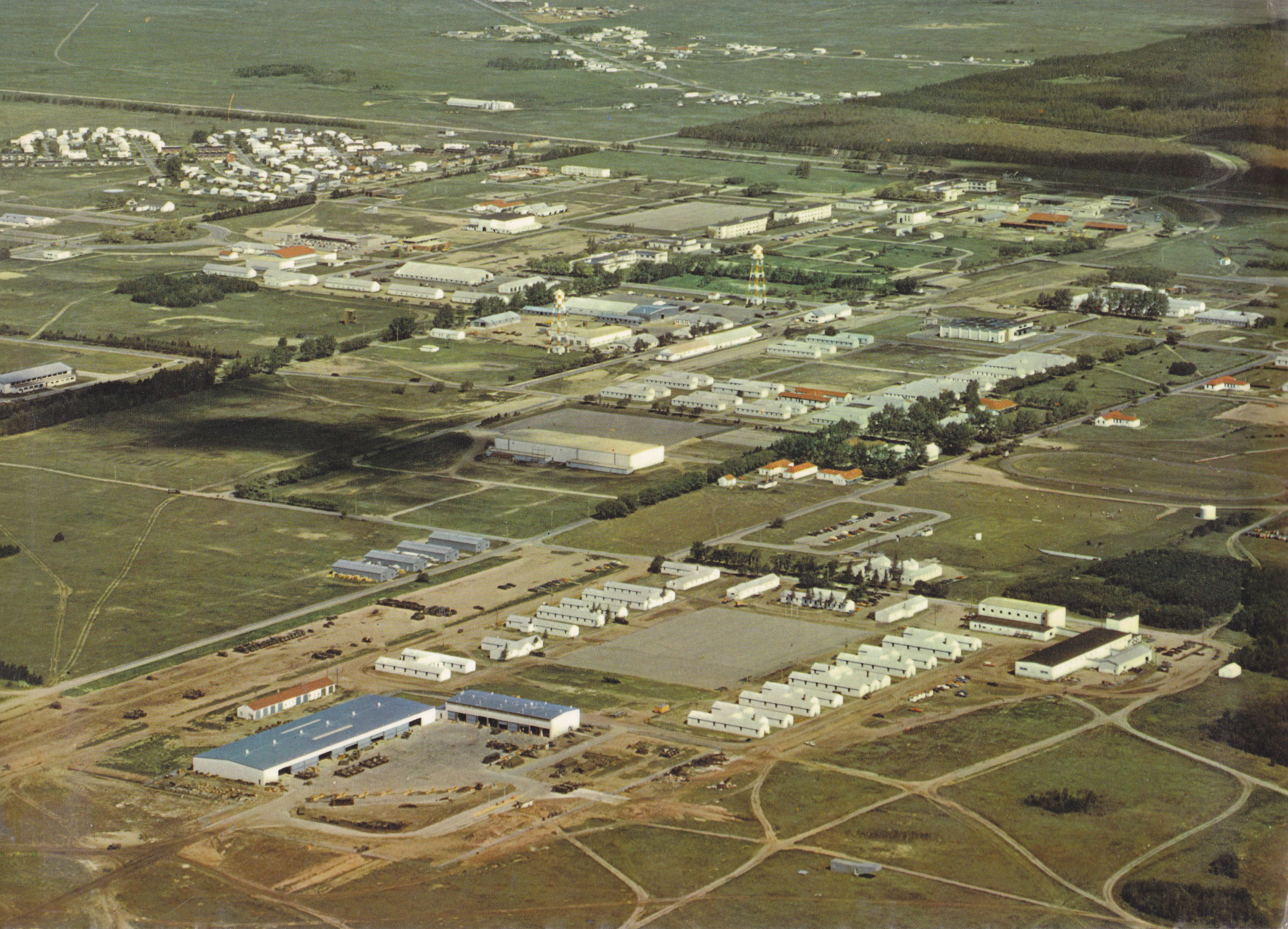
- CFB Shilo in 1987
- IATA: none; ICAO: none

Summary
- Airport type: Military
- Owner: Government of Canada
- Operator: DND
- Location: Shilo, Municipality of North Cypress – Langford / Municipality of Glenboro – South Cypress
- Built: 1932
- In use: 1910
- Commander: Lieutenant-Colonel Jack Nguyen
- Time zone: CST (UTC−06:00)
  - Summer (DST): CDT (UTC−05:00)
- Elevation AMSL: 1,225 ft (373 m)
- Coordinates: 49°48′N 099°38′W
- Website: http://www.army-armee.forces.gc.ca/en/cfb-shilo/index.page

Map
- Location in Manitoba CFB Shilo (Canada)
- Sources: Canada Flight Supplement

Canadian Forces Base Shilo (CFB Shilo; French: Base des Forces canadiennes Shilo — BFC Shilo) is an operations and training base of the Canadian Armed Forces, located 35 km (22 mi) east of Brandon, Manitoba and adjacent to Sprucewoods. During the 1990s, Canadian Forces Base Shilo was also designated as an Area Support Unit, which acts as a local base of operations for south-west Manitoba in times of military and civil emergency.

It is located at the very south-west corner of the Municipality of North Cypress – Langford, and the very northwest corner of the Municipality of Glenboro – South Cypress. Additionally, it lies adjacent to the eastern border of the Rural Municipality of Cornwallis. The base has an 18-hole golf course, which hosts numerous military and civilian golf events.

== History and demographics ==
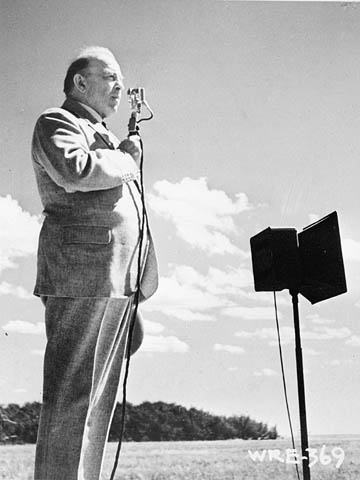
The Prime Minister of Canada William Lyon Mackenzie King talking to soldiers at CFB Shilo

CFB Shilo has been a training facility for the Canadian Army since 1910, and saw an increase in its use as a training facility following the outbreak of World War I. The base is also home to the Royal Canadian Artillery Museum and many artillery pieces are on display including a cannon used at the North-West Rebellion.

The principal purpose of this base is for training in artillery and munitions, activities audibly recognized, though not begrudged, by generations of nearby residents. In 1942, training of the 1st Canadian Parachute Battalion was transferred here from Fort Benning, Georgia and RAF Ringway in the United Kingdom. The existence of the base has enhanced the economic stability of the surrounding area through contracted employment with the Department of National Defence, and provision of off-base services to staff and trainees. CFB Shilo provides employment for approximately 1,400 military personnel, as well as an additional estimated 450 civilian personnel. The base is located within the federal electoral district of Brandon—Souris.

== Geographic/geological significance ==
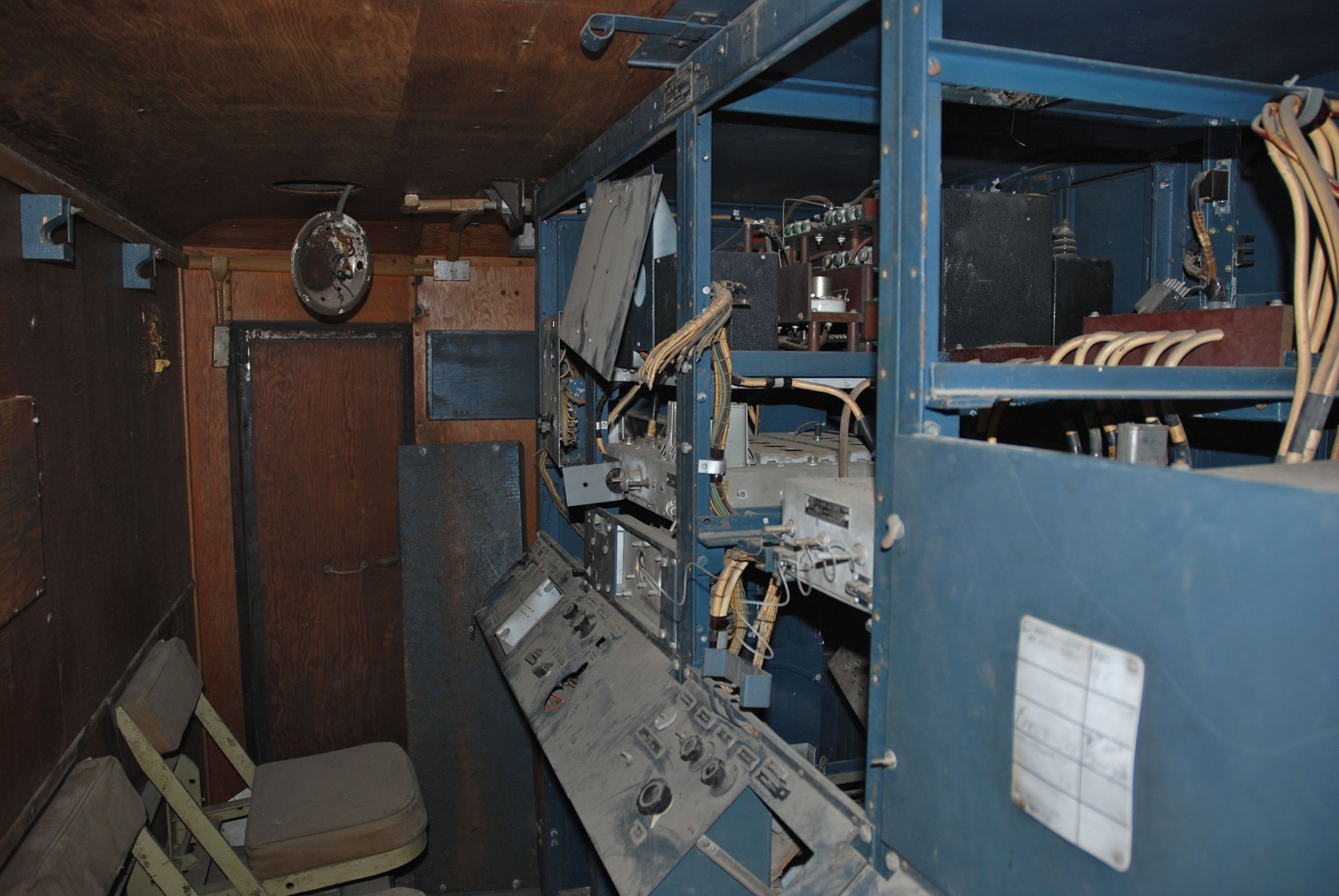
Interior of unrestored Radar from the Royal Canadian Artillery Museum

The landscape in this area is particularly well suited to these operations. The rolling hills are well suited to hidden target firing drills. Soil compositions of loose sand/gravel aggregates are also ideal for artillery and munitions training. The lack of surface bedrock outcropping greatly reduces the chances of hazardous ricochets during live-fire exercises and also assists in the safe retrieval and secure disposal of both detonated and un-detonated ordnance.

== Units ==
CFB Shilo is the home to the following operational units:

- 1st Regiment, Royal Canadian Horse Artillery
- 2nd Battalion, Princess Patricia's Canadian Light Infantry

It hosts the following detachments supporting 3rd Canadian Division:

- 3rd Canadian Division Training Centre, "C" Company Shilo
- 1 Military Police Regiment, detachment Shilo.
- 11 CF Health Services Centre
- 3rd Canadian Division Support Group Signal Squadron, detachment Shilo
Princess Patricia's Canadian Light Infantry

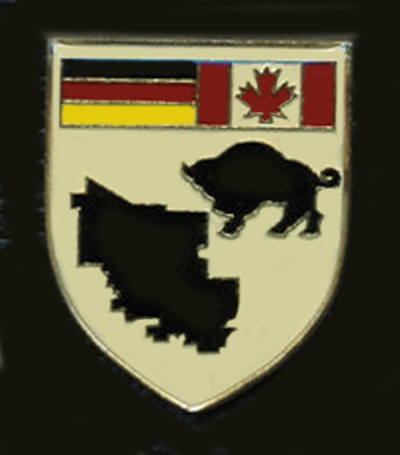
Shilo Training Area Command badge showing the connection with Germany

== External connections/partnerships ==
Throughout the years both Regular Forces and Primary Reserve troops have trained at CFB Shilo. Troops from other countries, such as Germany, France, Denmark and the United States, have used the area for training. In particular the German Army Training Establishment Shilo has, from 1974 to 2000, trained in excess of 140,000 troops.

CFB Shilo has also seen use by Royal Canadian Mounted Police officers and employees of the Manitoba Department of Corrections.

== Transportation ==
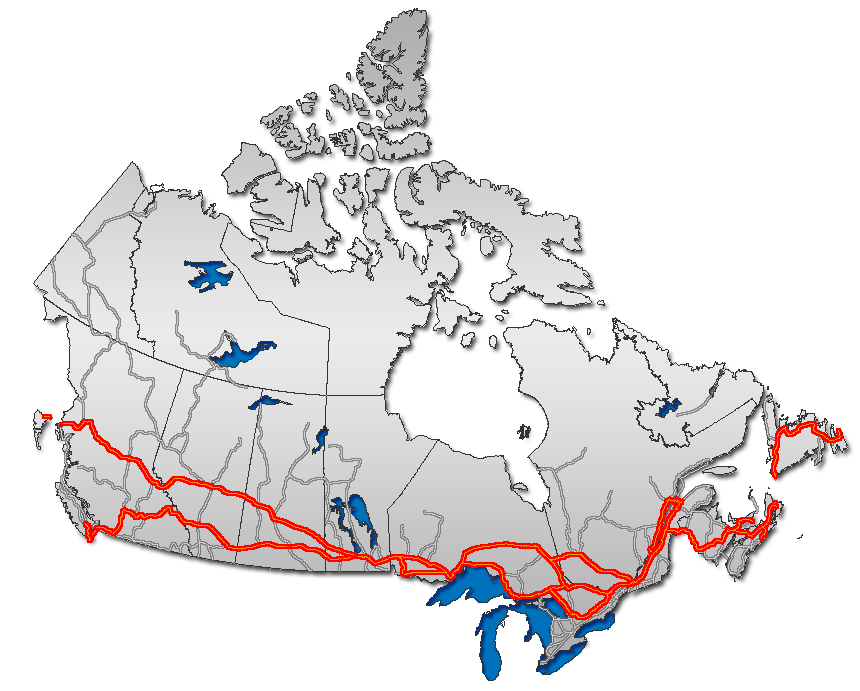
The base is 8 km (5.0 mi) south of the Trans-Canada Highway.

The base is 8 kilometres (5.0 mi) south of the Trans-Canada Highway on PR 340. There were two heliports associated with the base. Shilo Heliport TC LID: CKM3 was located on the base while Shilo (Flewin Field) TC LID: CKN9, was located 1.1 nautical miles (2.0 km; 1.3 mi) south at |49°46′51″N 099°38′20″W.

== Royal Canadian Artillery Museum ==
The Royal Canadian Artillery Museum is the only museum in the world that explores the history of Canadian gunners who served Canada since 1855. Established in 1962 at CFB Shilo and provides a national portrait of Canadian gunnery. It includes more than 65,000 artifacts, including more than 150 artillery pieces and vehicles.

== Financial information ==
CFB Shilo expends $105 million yearly in salaries and purchases, has 1,350 military people and employs 350 civilians.
