= Manitoba Provincial Road 247 =

Provincial Road in Manitoba, Canada

Provincial Road 247
- PR 200 highlighted in red

Route information
- Maintained by Department of Infrastructure
- Length: 68.2 km (42.4 mi)
- Existed: 1966–present

Major junctions
- West end: PTH 2 in Elm Creek
- PTH 3 / PR 334 in Sanford; PR 330 in La Salle
- East end: PTH 75 in Howden

Location
- Country: Canada
- Province: Manitoba
- Rural municipalities: Grey, Macdonald, Ritchot

Highway system
- Provincial highways in Manitoba; Winnipeg City Routes
← PR 246	→ PR 248

Provincial Road 247 (PR 247) is a 68.2-kilometre-long (42.4 mi) east-west highway in the Central Plains and Eastman regions of Manitoba, Canada. It serves to connect the hamlets of Elm Creek, Sanford, La Salle, and Howden, including two crossings of the La Salle River. The majority of the highway is gravel.

== Route description ==
PR 247 begins along the eastern edge of Elm Creek at an intersection with PTH 2 (Red Coat Trail) in the Rural Municipality of Grey. It heads south as a gravel road along the eastern edge of Elm Creek for a couple kilometres before leaving town and making a sharp left turn. The highway travels through rural farmland for several kilometres, having an intersection with PR 248 just south of Fannystelle before entering the Rural Municipality of Macdonald. PR 247 has an intersection with Allison Road 10W, which leads to nearby Starbuck Airport, before crossing the Morris River, making a sharp left turn, and having a short concurrency (overlap) with PR 332 just south of Starbuck. The highway becomes paved and concurrent with PR 334 as it enters Sanford, crossing a railroad track and passing through downtown along Mandan Drive. They make a sharp right turn at an intersection with Main Street before PR 247 joins PTH 3, with PR 334 continuing south towards Domain.

PR 247 formerly continued along Mandan Drive to cross its own bridge over the La Salle River and meet PTH 3 at its own intersection prior to 2016, when that bridge (built in 1921) was suddenly closed and later demolished without prior announcement.

PTH 3 / PR 247 cross the La Salle River, leaving Sanford with PR 247 splitting off and heading east as a gravel road shortly thereafter. It travels through rural farmland for several kilometres, crossing a small creek before becoming paved as it goes through a switchback to cross the La Salle River a second time. Entering the town of La Salle, the highway travels through neighbourhoods before having a short concurrency with PR 330 (Rue Principale) in downtown. PR 247 leaves town to travel through a switchback before entering the Rural Municipality of Ritchot. The highway comes to an end shortly thereafter at an intersection with PTH 75 (Lord Selkirk Highway) along the western edge of Howden. The entire length of Provincial Road 247 is a two-lane road.

== Major intersections ==
Division	Location	km	mi	Destinations	Notes
Grey	Elm Creek	0.0	0.0	PTH 2 (Red Coat Trail) – Elm Creek, Winnipeg	Western terminus
Grey	Elm Creek	0.5	0.31	Church Avenue E – Elm Creek	
Grey		16.4	10.2	PR 248 – Fannystelle	
Macdonald		23.0	14.3	Allison Road 10W – Starbuck Airport	
Macdonald		27.5	17.1	Bridge over the Morris River	
Macdonald		29.6	18.4	PR 332 north – Starbuck	Western end of PR 332 concurrency
Macdonald		32.9	20.4	PR 332 south – Brunkild	Eastern end of PR 332 concurrency
Macdonald		41.1	25.5	PR 334 north – Springstein	Western end of PR 334 concurrency
Macdonald	Sanford	42.3	26.3	Mandan Drive / Main Street	PR 247 formerly continued along Mandan Drive until 2016
Macdonald	Sanford	43.1	26.8	PTH 3 west – Brunkild; PR 334 south – Domain	Eastern end of PR 334 concurrency; western end of PTH 3 concurrency
Macdonald	Sanford	43.3– 43.4	26.9– 27.0	Bridge over the La Salle River	
Macdonald	Sanford	44.6	27.7	Mandan Drive	Former PR 247
Macdonald		46.4	28.8	PTH 3 east – Winnipeg	Eastern end of PTH 3 concurrency
Macdonald	La Salle	55.2	34.3	Bridge over the La Salle River	
Macdonald	La Salle	57.7	35.9	PR 330 south (Rue Principale) – Morris	Western end of PR 330 concurrency
Macdonald	La Salle	58.3	36.2	PR 330 north (Rue Principale) – Winnipeg	Eastern end of PR 330 concurrency
Ritchot	Howden	68.2	42.4	PTH 75 (Lord Selkirk Highway) – Winnipeg, Emerson	Eastern terminus
1.000 mi = 1.609 km; 1.000 km = 0.621 mi: Concurrency terminus
