= Manitoba Provincial Road 334 =

Provincial Road in Manitoba, Canada

Provincial Road 334
- PR 334 highlighted in red

Route information
- Maintained by Department of Infrastructure
- Length: 55.4 km (34.4 mi)
- Existed: 1966–present

Major junctions
- South end: PR 330 in Domain
- PTH 3 / PR 247 in Sanford; PTH 2 near Oak Bluff; PTH 1 (TCH) / YH in Headingley
- North end: PR 221 near Rosser

Location
- Country: Canada
- Province: Manitoba
- Rural municipalities: Macdonald, Headingley, Rosser

Highway system
- Provincial highways in Manitoba; Winnipeg City Routes
← PR 332	→ PR 336

Provincial Road 334 (PR 334) is a 55.4-kilometre-long (34.4 mi) north–south highway in the Winnipeg Capital Region of Manitoba, Canada. Mostly composed of gravel, it connects the communities and towns of Domain, Sanford, Headingley, and Rosser. PR 334 includes several crossings of the La Salle River, as well as the Taylor Bridge across the Assiniboine River between South Headingley and Headingley.

== Route description ==
PR 334 begins in the Rural Municipality of Macdonald at an intersection with PR 330 on the north side of Domain, heading northwest along gravel as it zig-zags through rural farmland for several kilometres, where it makes its first two crossings of the La Salle River (the second of which is closed currently with a detour in place). The highway becomes paved as it enters Sanford at a junction between PTH 3 and PR 247, joining PR 247 in a concurrency (overlap) to enter downtown and make a left onto Mandan Drive. Leaving both asphalt and Sanford behind at a railroad crossing, the pair continue west through farmland for a short distance before PR 334 splits off and heads north through rural farmland for several kilometres, where it makes its third crossing of the La Salle River. PR 334 runs concurrently with PTH 2 (Red Coat Trail) for 3 kilometres (1.9 mi) (which is paved) before going through a switchback to enter the Rural Municipality of Headingley.

PR 334 crosses both PR 427 (Wilkes Avenue) and a railway before entering South Headingley at an intersection with PR 221 (Roblin Boulevard), becoming paved once again as it makes a left onto Roblin Boulevard. It now makes a right onto Bridge Road and immediately crosses the historic Taylor Bridge over the Assiniboine River, entering Headingley to pass through neighbourhoods and a business district before joining a short concurrency with PTH 1 (Trans-Canada Highway / Yellowhead Highway) westbound through the centre of town. PR 334 now heads north along Dodd Road, travelling through a neighbourhood to come to an intersection with PR 425 (Saskatchewan Avenue), where the pavement turns to gravel once again and the highway makes a sharp left onto Bobiche Street. Leaving Headingley, the highway makes a sharp right to pass through another neighbourhood before entering the Rural Municipality of Rosser through a switchback.

PR 334 heads due north through rural farmland, travelling past the Sturgeon Creek Hutterite Colony as it crosses Sturgeon Creek, before coming to an end just east of the town of Rosser at a junction with PR 221 (Rosser Road).

== History ==
Prior to 1992, PR 334 continued north following a short concurrency (overlap) with PR 221 (Rosser Road) through Rosser, then turned north along Meridian Road, following it all the way to the boundary with the Rural Municipalities of Rockwood and Woodlands. It now made a right onto Road 72N, following it east for a short distance to enter the town of Grosse Isle, coming to an end at an intersection between PTH 6 (Northern Woods and Water Route) and PR 321 (Road 72N). PR 334's original length was 67.9 kilometres (42.2 mi).

== Major intersections ==
Division	Location	km	mi	Destinations	Notes
Macdonald	Domain	0.0	0.0	PR 330 – La Salle, Domain	Southern terminus; road continues east as Dryden Road (Road 42N)
Macdonald		7.7	4.8	Bridge over the La Salle River	
Macdonald		10.1	6.3	Bridge over the La Salle River (currently closed)	
Macdonald	Sanford	14.5	9.0	PTH 3 east / PR 247 – Brunkild, Winnipeg	Southern end of PR 247 concurrency
Macdonald	Sanford	14.5	9.0	Pavement begins	
Macdonald	Sanford	15.3	9.5	Mandan Drive / Main Street	Mandan Drive is former PR 247 east
Macdonald	Sanford	15.9	9.9	Pavement ends at railroad crossing	
Macdonald		16.6	10.3	PR 247 west – Elm Creek	Northern end of PR 247 concurrency
Macdonald		18.4	11.4	Bridge over the La Salle River	
Macdonald		26.4	16.4	PTH 2 west (Red Coat Trail) – Elm Creek	Southern end of PTH 2 concurrency; southern end of paved section
Macdonald		29.7	18.5	PTH 2 east (Red Coat Trail) – Winnipeg	Northern end of PTH 2 concurrency; northern end of paved section
Headingley		38.0	23.6	PR 427 (Wilkes Avenue) – Calrin, Winnipeg	
Headingley	South Headingley	41.0	25.5	PR 241 east (Roblin Boulevard) – Winnipeg	Western terminus of PR 241
Headingley	South Headingley	41.0	25.5	Pavement begins	
Headingley	South Headingley	41.7	25.9	Roblin Boulevard – Beaudry Provincial Park	Former PR 241 west
Headingley	South Headingley–Headingley boundary	41.8– 42.0	26.0– 26.1	Taylor Bridge over the Assiniboine River	
Headingley	Headingley	42.7	26.5	PTH 1 (TCH) east / YH east – Winnipeg	Southern end of PTH 1 concurrency
Headingley	Headingley	43.1	26.8	PTH 1 (TCH) west / YH west – Portage la Prairie	Northern end of PTH 1 concurrency
Headingley	Headingley	45.4	28.2	PR 425 east (Saskatchewan Avenue) – Winnipeg	Western terminus of PR 425
Headingley	Headingley	45.4	28.2	Pavement ends	
Rosser		49.8	30.9	Bridge over Sturgeon Creek	
Rosser		55.4	34.4	PR 221 (Rosser Road) – Rosser, Winnipeg	Northern terminus; road continues north as Road 1E
1.000 mi = 1.609 km; 1.000 km = 0.621 mi: Concurrency terminus; Closed/former
