= Manitoba Provincial Road 330 =

Provincial road in Manitoba, Canada

Provincial Road 330
- PR 330 highlighted in red

Route information
- Maintained by Manitoba Infrastructure
- Length: 46 km (29 mi)
- Existed: 1966–present

Major junctions
- North end: PTH 100 (TCH) near Winnipeg
- South end: PTH 75 near Morris

Location
- Country: Canada
- Province: Manitoba
- Rural municipalities: Macdonald; Morris

Highway system
- Provincial highways in Manitoba; Winnipeg City Routes
← PR 329	→ PR 331

Provincial Road 330 (PR 330) is a provincial road in the south-central part of the Canadian province of Manitoba. It is a heavily used route linking the city of Winnipeg with the bedroom community of La Salle and an alternate to Provincial Trunk Highway 75 (PTH 75), the main highway between Winnipeg and the town of Morris.

== Route description ==
PR 330 begins at the Perimeter Highway (PTH 100) in the Rural Municipality of Macdonald and heads south, passing through the communities of La Salle and Domain before ending at PTH 75 north of Morris. The route is a 2 way paved hoghway with 10 km of gravel road.

== Major intersections ==
Division	Location	km	mi	Destinations	Notes
Morris		0.0	0.0	PTH 75 (Lord Selkirk Highway) – Winnipeg, Morris	Southern terminus; begins as a gravel road
Morris		4.8	3.0	Road 28N – Riverside	
Morris	McTavish	9.7	6.0	PR 205 – Rosenort, Aubigny	
Morris	McTavish	9.7	6.0	Pavement begins	
Macdonald		23.2	14.4	PR 305 east – Ste. Agathe	Southern end of PR 305 concurrency
Macdonald		25.0	15.5	PR 305 west – Brunkild	Northern end of PR 305 concurrency
Macdonald	Domain	28.6	17.8	PR 334 north – Sanford	Southern terminus of PR 334
Macdonald	La Salle	37.0	23.0	PR 247 west – Sanford	Southern end of PR 247 concurrency
Macdonald	La Salle	37.5	23.3	PR 247 east (First Avenue) – Howden	Northern end of PR 247 concurrency
Macdonald	La Salle	37.6– 37.7	23.4– 23.4	Bridge over the La Salle River	
Macdonald		46.4	28.8	PTH 100 (TCH) (South Perimeter Highway) – Portage La Prairie, Kenora	Northern terminus
1.000 mi = 1.609 km; 1.000 km = 0.621 mi: Concurrency terminus
