= Manitoba Provincial Road 332 =

Provincial Road in Manitoba, Canada

Provincial Road 332
- PR 332 highlighted in red

Route information
- Maintained by Department of Infrastructure
- Length: 87.2 km (54.2 mi)

Major junctions
- South end: PTH 14 / PTH 30 in Rosenfeld
- PTH 23 in Lowe Farm; PTH 3 in Brunkild; PTH 2 in Starbuck
- North end: PTH 1 (TCH) / YH in Dacotah

Location
- Country: Canada
- Province: Manitoba
- Rural municipalities: Rhineland, Morris, Macdonald, Cartier

Highway system
- Provincial highways in Manitoba; Winnipeg City Routes
← PR 331	→ PR 334

Provincial Road 332 (PR 332) is a 87.2-kilometre-long (54.2 mi) north–south highway in the Pembina Valley and Central Plains regions of Manitoba. Serving as a northern continuation of the much shorter PTH 30, it connects the communities of Rosenfeld, Lowe Farm, Brunkild, Starbuck, and Dacotah.

== Route description ==
PR 332 begins in the Municipality of Rhineland at an intersection between PTH 14 and the north end of PTH 30 on the southern edge of Rosenfeld. It heads north through the centre of town along Main Street, with the pavement turning to gravel just past Oliver Avenue, before leaving Rosenfeld and traversing a switchback as it crosses a railway. The highway crosses a bridge over the Plum River before entering the Rural Municipality of Morris, travelling through rural farmland for several kilometres to cross a floodway before joining a concurrency (overlap) with PTH 23, becoming paved as the two head west into the town of Lowe Farm. Forming both Main Street and the southern boundary of town, the pass through both neighbourhoods and the main business district before PR 332 splits off and heads north as a gravel road once again, leaving Lowe Farm travelling through rural farmland again for several kilometres, sharing a short concurrency with PR 205 near Sperling before entering the Rural Municipality of Macdonald.

PR 332 crosses the Morris River near its confluence with the Boyne River before entering Brunkild, becoming paved as it passes through the eastern side of town to have intersections with both PR 305 and PTH 3. After crossing the Central Manitoba Railway, PR 332 turns to gravel again as it leaves Brunkild behind and heads north through rural areas, having a short concurrency with PR 247 near Sanford. The highway passes by Starbuck Airport before entering the town of Starbuck at an intersection with PTH 2 (Red Coat Trail), becoming paved as it passes through the centre of downtown along Main Street, crossing both a railway and a bridge over the La Salle River. After passing through some neighbourhoods on the north side of town, PR 332 turns to gravel again as it leaves Starbuck and heads north through farmland. Entering the Rural Municipality of Cartier, the highway traverses a switchback before travelling through the centre of Dacotah, crossing a railway before coming to an end at a junction with PTH 1 (Trans-Canada Highway / Yellowhead Highway).

== Major intersections ==
Division	Location	km	mi	Destinations	Notes
Rhineland	Rosenfeld	0.0	0.0	PTH 14 to PTH 75 – Winkler; PTH 30 south – Altona	Southern terminus; road continues south as PTH 30 southbound
Rhineland	Rosenfeld	1.3	0.81	Pavement ends	
Rhineland		6.6	4.1	Bridge over the Plum River	
Morris		18.2	11.3	PTH 23 east – Morris	Southern end of PTH 23 concurrency and paved section
Morris	Lowe Farm	21.5	13.4	PTH 23 west – Roland	Northern end of PTH 23 concurrency and paved section
Morris		37.9	23.5	PR 205 west – Sperling	Southern end of PR 205 concurrency
Morris		39.5	24.5	PR 205 east – Rosenort	Northern end of PR 205 concurrency
Macdonald		47.5	29.5	Bridge over the Morris River	
Macdonald	Brunkild	49.2	30.6	Pavement begins	
Macdonald	Brunkild	49.4	30.7	PR 305 (Road 40NW)	
Macdonald	Brunkild	49.8	30.9	PTH 3 – Sperling, Sanford	
Macdonald		50.0	31.1	Pavement ends	
Macdonald		59.3	36.8	PR 247 east – Sanford	Southern end of PR 247 concurrency
Macdonald		62.6	38.9	PR 247 west – Elm Creek	Northern end of PR 247 concurrency
Macdonald		65.9	40.9	Road 48NW – Starbuck Airport	
Macdonald	Starbuck	72.4	45.0	PTH 2 (Red Coat Trail) – Elm Creek, Winnipeg	
Macdonald	Starbuck	72.4	45.0	Pavement begins	
Macdonald	Starbuck	72.7– 72.8	45.2– 45.2	Bridge over the La Salle River	
Macdonald	Starbuck	73.4	45.6	Pavement ends	
Cartier	Dacotah	87.2	54.2	PTH 1 (TCH) / YH – Portage la Prairie, Winnipeg	Northern terminus; road continues north as Maxwell Road
1.000 mi = 1.609 km; 1.000 km = 0.621 mi: Concurrency terminus
