= Manitoba Provincial Road 427 =

Provincial road in Manitoba, Canada

Provincial Road 427
- Wilkes Avenue

Route information
- Maintained by Manitoba Infrastructure
- Length: 12.8 km (8.0 mi)
- Existed: 1966–present

Major junctions
- West end: PR 424 near Calrin
- PR 334 near South Headingley
- East end: PTH 100 (TCH) / Route 145 in Winnipeg

Location
- Country: Canada
- Province: Manitoba
- Rural municipalities: Cartier; Headingley
- Major cities: Winnipeg

Highway system
- Provincial highways in Manitoba; Winnipeg City Routes
← PR 426	→ PR 428

Provincial Road 427 (PR 427) is a short 12.8-kilometre-long (8.0 mi) east-west highway in the Winnipeg Metropolitan Region of Manitoba, Canada.

PR 427 is informally known as Wilkes Avenue, its former name before Headingley split from the city of Winnipeg in the 1990s. PR 427 provides the southern boundary for Beaudry Provincial Park.

== Major intersections ==
Division	Location	km	mi	Destinations	Notes
Cartier		0.0	0.0	PR 424 – Springstein, Lido Plage, Beaudry Provincial Park	Western terminus; road continues west as Wilkes Road (Road 58N)
Headingley		7.4	4.6	PR 334 (Harris Road) – Headingley, Starbuck	
City of Winnipeg		12.8	8.0	Perimeter Highway (PTH 100 (TCH)) – Brandon, Kenora Wilkes Avenue (Route 145)	Interchange; eastern terminus; road continues east as Route 145
1.000 mi = 1.609 km; 1.000 km = 0.621 mi
