= Manitoba Provincial Road 241 =

Provincial road in Manitoba, Canada

Provincial Road 241
- Roblin Boulevard
- PR 241 highlighted in red

Route information
- Maintained by Manitoba Infrastructure
- Length: 5.3 km (3.3 mi)
- Existed: 1966–present

Major junctions
- West end: PR 334 south at Headingley
- East end: PTH 100 (TCH) / Route 105 east in Winnipeg

Location
- Country: Canada
- Province: Manitoba
- Rural municipalities: Headingley
- Major cities: Winnipeg

Highway system
- Provincial highways in Manitoba; Winnipeg City Routes
← PR 240	→ PR 242

Provincial Road 241 (PR 241) is a short provincial road in Manitoba, Canada. It begins at Winnipeg's Perimeter Highway (PTH 100) and runs east into the Rural Municipality of Headingley, ending at PR 334 south (Harris Road).

PR 241 is a western extension of Roblin Boulevard running along the south side of the Assiniboine River, used mostly by local residents and as an alternate to Portage Avenue (PTH 1) between Winnipeg and Headingley.

== History ==
Prior to 2001, PR 241 continued westward another 24.1 kilometres (15.0 mi) along what is now Lido Plage Road (former PR 424) and PR 424 past Lido Plage and the Trans-Canada to an intersection with PR 248 just south of St. Eustache in the Rural Municipality of Cartier. This was transferred to PR 424 in 2001, truncating PR 241 to its intersection with Lido Plage Road. In 2013, the section of Roblin Boulevard between Lido Plage Road and PR 334 in South Headingley, which is now a municipal road, was decommissioned, leaving the short section there is today.

== Major intersections ==
Division	Location	km	mi	Destinations	Notes
Cartier		−8.1	−5.0	PR 424 (Lido Paige Road) – Springstein, St. Eustache	Former western terminus until 2013; former PR 424
Cartier	Beaudry Provincial Park	−6.6	−4.1	Beaudry Provincial Park	Access road into park
Headingley	South Headingley	−0.7	−0.43	PR 334 north (Bridge Road) to PTH 1 (TCH) – Headingley	Former western end of PR 334 concurrency
Headingley	South Headingley	0.0	0.0	PR 334 south (Harris Road) – Sanford	Current western terminus; former eastern end of PR 334 concurrency
City of Winnipeg		5.3	3.3	PTH 100 (TCH) (South Perimeter Highway) – Portage la Prairie, Kenora; Route 150 east (Roblin Boulevard) – Winnipeg	Interchange; eastern terminus; road continues as Route 150 east
1.000 mi = 1.609 km; 1.000 km = 0.621 mi: Closed/former
