= Manitoba Provincial Road 424 =

Provincial road in Manitoba, Canada

Provincial Road 424
- PR 424 highlighted in red

Route information
- Maintained by Department of Infrastructure
- Length: 34.5 km (21.4 mi)
- Existed: 1966–present

Major junctions
- South end: PTH 2 near Springstein
- PR 427 near Calrin; PTH 1 (TCH) / YH near Lido Plage
- North end: PR 248 near St. Eustache

Location
- Country: Canada
- Province: Manitoba
- Rural municipalities: Macdonald, Cartier

Highway system
- Provincial highways in Manitoba; Winnipeg City Routes
← PR 423	→ PR 425

Provincial Road 424 (PR 424) is a 34.5-kilometre-long (21.4 mi) north-south highway in both the Central Plains and Winnipeg Metro regions of Manitoba. Almost entirely located within the Rural Municipality of Cartier, it connects Springstein and St. Eustache via Lido Plage.

== Route description ==
PR 424 begins in the Rural Municipality of Macdonald at a junction with PTH 2 (Red Coat Trail) between Starbuck and Oak Bluff, heading north as a paved two-lane highway to enter the Rural Municipality of Cartier and travel through Springstein, where the asphalt transitions to gravel. Heading due north through farmland, it has an intersection with PR 427 (Wilkes Avenue) just west of Calrin while simultaneously crossing a railway. The highway now curves westward, having an intersection with Lido Plage Road (former PR 424), providing access to Roblin Boulevard (former PR 241) and Beaudry Provincial Park) as it bypasses the community of Lido Plage. Curving back northward as it passes just to the north of White Plains, PR 424 has another intersection with Lido Plage Road shortly before crossing PTH 1 (Trans-Canada Highway / Yellowhead Highway). Now paralleling the south bank of the Assiniboine River, the highway heads northwest through rural farmland for the next several kilometres, passing the Lakeside, Barickman, Maxwell, and Rosedale Hutterite colonies before coming to an end just south of St. Eustache at an intersection with PR 248.

== History ==
Prior to 2001, PR 424 was only 10.0-kilometre-long (6.2 mi), stretching from PTH 2 (Red Coat Trail) near Springstein to PR 241 (Roblin Boulevard / Lido Plage Road) just south of Lido Plage and just west of Beaudry Provincial Park. In 2001, PR 241 was truncated to this intersection while all of former PR 241 west to PR 248 just south of St. Eudtache was transferred to PR 424. In 2013, a bypass of Lido Plage opened, with no major changes to the highway since.

== Major intersections ==
Division	Location	km	mi	Destinations	Notes
Macdonald		0.0	0.0	PTH 2 (Red Coat Trail) – Winnipeg, Elm Creek	Southern terminus; road continues south as Road 2W
Cartier	Springstein	4.0	2.5	Victoria Road – Springstein	
Cartier	Springstein	4.9	3.0	Wilhelm Enns Way (Road 55N)	Pavement ends
Cartier		8.6	5.3	PR 427 east (Wilkes Avenue) – Winnipeg	Western terminus of PR 427
Cartier		9.9	6.2	Lido Plage Road to Roblin Boulevard – Lido Plage, Beaudry Provincial Park	Former PR 424 north; provides access to Roblin Boulevard (former PR 241 east)
Cartier		12.8	8.0	White Plains Road – White Plains	
Cartier		14.8	9.2	Lido Plage Road – Lido Plage	Former PR 424 south; former PR 241 east
Cartier		15.0	9.3	PTH 1 (TCH) / YH – Portage la Prairie, Winnipeg	
Cartier		34.5	21.4	PR 248 – Elie, St. Eustache	Northern terminus; road continues west as Picard Road (Road 65N)
1.000 mi = 1.609 km; 1.000 km = 0.621 mi
