= Carman Junction =

Railway junction in Manitoba, Canada

Coordinates: 49.840556°N 97.283333°W

Carman Junction is a railway junction in the Canadian province of Manitoba to the west of Winnipeg. It is a link between Canadian National Railway's Rivers subdivision and the Central Manitoba Railway.

== Scotland ==
A geocaching point with the same name, possibly named after a railway junction, exists in southern Scotland near N 55° 58.716 W 004° 37.009 or British Grid: NS 36822 79264. https://www.geocaching.com/geocache/GC4TE0D_carman-junction
