= James Cunningham (Manitoba politician) =

Canadian politician

James Cunningham (ca 1817 – April 27, 1915) was a political figure in Manitoba. He represented Headingly from 1870 to 1874 in the Legislative Assembly of Manitoba.

He was born in Fort Churchill (the Parliamentary Companion (1872) identifies his place of birth as Île-à-la-Crosse, Saskatchewan), the son of Patrick Cunningham, an employee of the Hudson's Bay Company. The family moved to Kildonan on the Red River in 1828 two years after the death of his father. Cunningham married Sarah, the daughter of Alexander Ross. He lived in Headingley and also in Poplar Point. He later married Letitia Pritchard following the death of his first wife. Cunningham was defeated by John Taylor in the first general election held in the province, but was later declared elected after some votes were declared invalid.

Cunningham died at Somerset and was buried in Kildonan.
