= Manitoba Provincial Road 425 =

Provincial road in Manitoba, Canada

Provincial Road 425
- Saskatchewan Avenue
- PR 425 highlighted in red

Route information
- Maintained by Department of Infrastructure
- Length: 6.0 km (3.7 mi)
- Existed: 1966–present

Major junctions
- West end: PR 334 in Headingley
- East end: Saskatchewan Avenue in Winnipeg

Location
- Country: Canada
- Province: Manitoba
- Rural municipalities: Headingley
- Major cities: Winnipeg

Highway system
- Provincial highways in Manitoba; Winnipeg City Routes
← PR 424	→ PR 426

Provincial Road 425 (PR 425) is a short 6.0-kilometre-long (3.7 mi) east–west highway in the Winnipeg Metropolitan Region of Manitoba. Being the provincially maintained portion Saskatchewan Avenue, it is mostly a two-lane gravel road, serving as an alternative to PTH 1 between Headingley and Winnipeg, as well as providing another access to the Assiniboia Downs. The highway travels almost entirely through rural farmland, including a rather sudden and sharp switchback at a railway crossing.

Prior to 2012, when PTH 190 (Centreport Canada Way) was opened, PR 425 could be accessed from PTH 101 (North Perimeter Highway) via an at-grade intersection. Access was closed as an overpass was built as part of the interchange between PTH 101 and PTH 190.

== Major intersections ==
Division	Location	km	mi	Destinations	Notes
Headingley	Headingley	0.0	0.0	PR 334 (Dodds Road / Bobiche Street) – Headingley, Rosser	Western terminus
City of Winnipeg		6.0	3.7	Saskatchewan Avenue	End of provincial maintenance; continuation into Winnipeg; PTH 101 underpass; eastern terminus
1.000 mi = 1.609 km; 1.000 km = 0.621 mi
