= Osborne, Manitoba =

Osborne
- Location of Osborne in Manitoba
- Coordinates: 49°32′31″N 97°22′8″W
- Country: Canada
- Province: Manitoba
- Region: Winnipeg Capital Region
- Census Division: No. 10

Government
  - Governing Body: Rural Municipality of Macdonald Council
  - MP: Candice Bergen
  - MLA: Lauren Stone
- Time zone: UTC−6 (CST)
  - Summer (DST): UTC−5 (CDT)
- Area codes: 204, 431
- NTS Map: 062H11
- GNBC Code: GAUMI

Osborne is an unincorporated community in south central Manitoba, Canada. It is located on Provincial Road 330 approximately 41 kilometers (26 miles) south of Winnipeg, Manitoba in the Rural Municipality of Macdonald.
