= CEMR =

CEMR may refer to:

- Council of European Municipalities and Regions
- Central Manitoba Railway
