= Enfranchisement =

Enfranchisement or franchisement may refer to:

- Suffrage, the granting of the right to vote
- Manumission, the granting of freedom to an enslaved person by their owner
- The former process by which a Status Indian in Canada would gain certain rights, including the vote, by voluntarily or automatically surrendering the special privileges afforded them under the Indian Act

== See also ==
- Disfranchisement
