= Cando Rail & Terminals =

Canadian railroad contractor

Cando Rail and Terminals Ltd.
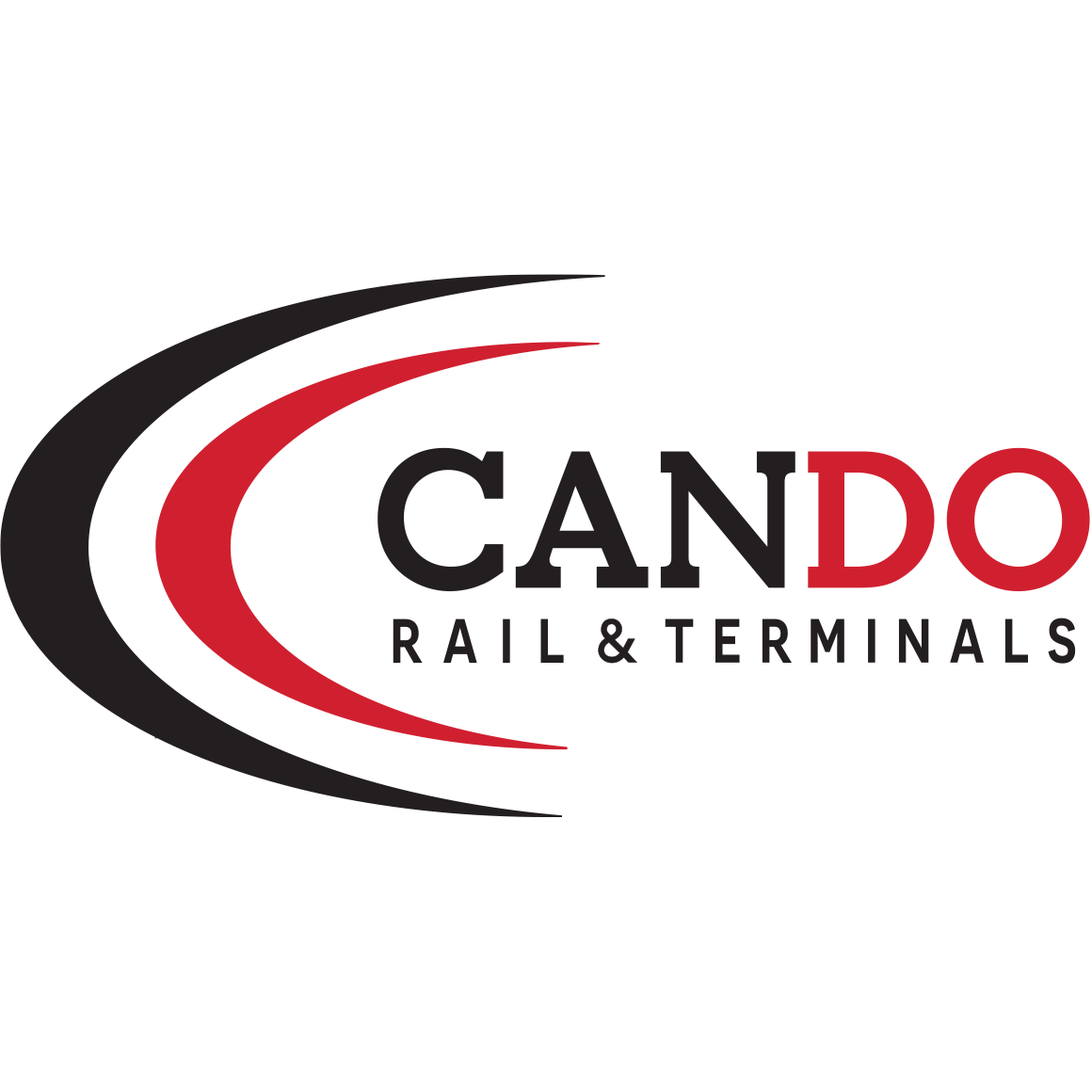

Overview
- Headquarters: Brandon, Manitoba
- Reporting mark: CCGX; CEMR
- Locale: Canada; United States
- Dates of operation: 1978–Present

Technical
- Track gauge: 4 ft 8 1/2 in (1,435 mm) standard gauge

Other
- Website: http://www.candorail.com

Cando Rail and Terminals Ltd. (Commonly referred to simply as Cando, reporting mark CCGX) is a railroad contractor headquartered in Brandon, Manitoba, founded in 1978 by Gord Peters and Rick Hammond. Cando offers several services, including industrial switching, material handling, logistics, terminal and transload services, engineering and track services, railcar storage, railcar repair and short line operations. The short line operations include the Central Manitoba Railway and Barrie Collingwood Railway.

In 2017, Deloitte Canada named Cando as one of "Canada's Best Managed Companies" for 2016.

== History ==
Gord Peters and Rick Hammond founded Cando Contracting Ltd. in 1978, as a small rail line dismantling and salvage company in Manitoba. They would remove pieces of track and sell the materials. Gord's father Art and brother Doug were also a big part of the company's success in the early years.

Cando's first contract was for two abandoned rail lines near Tilston, Manitoba for Canadian Pacific, who at the time was abandoning smaller subdivisions in order to focus on east–west traffic across Canada. Gord and Rick bid on the jobs while having no equipment or experience. When, to their surprise, they got both jobs, Gord drove home with a loan from his father, and started Cando Contracting Ltd.

In 1996, the company established an Employee Ownership Program, and in 2017 Cando said that over 80% of the company is owned by present and retired employees.

In 1999, Cando bought the Carman and Pine Falls Subdivisions, two recently abandoned Manitoba branch lines, from Canadian National, and started the Central Manitoba Railway.

In 2013, Cando changed its name from Cando Contracting Ltd. to Cando Rail Services Ltd., and changed its logo. Cando also changed the livery for locomotives that it owned.

In April 2021, the company changed their name again, to Cando Rail & Terminals Ltd.

== Locations ==
While Cando first started in Manitoba, and is headquartered in Brandon, they now exist at over 25 sites across Canada, and parts of the United States.

In January 2016, Cando announced that it purchased the former Weyerhaeuser sawmill property on Mission Flats Road in Kamloops with the intention to turn it into 1000 spots of railcar storage, 80,000 feet of track and engineering and mechanical servicing areas. Cando opened phase one of the rail terminal in May 2017. The terminal also serves as their B.C. headquarters.

== Gallery ==
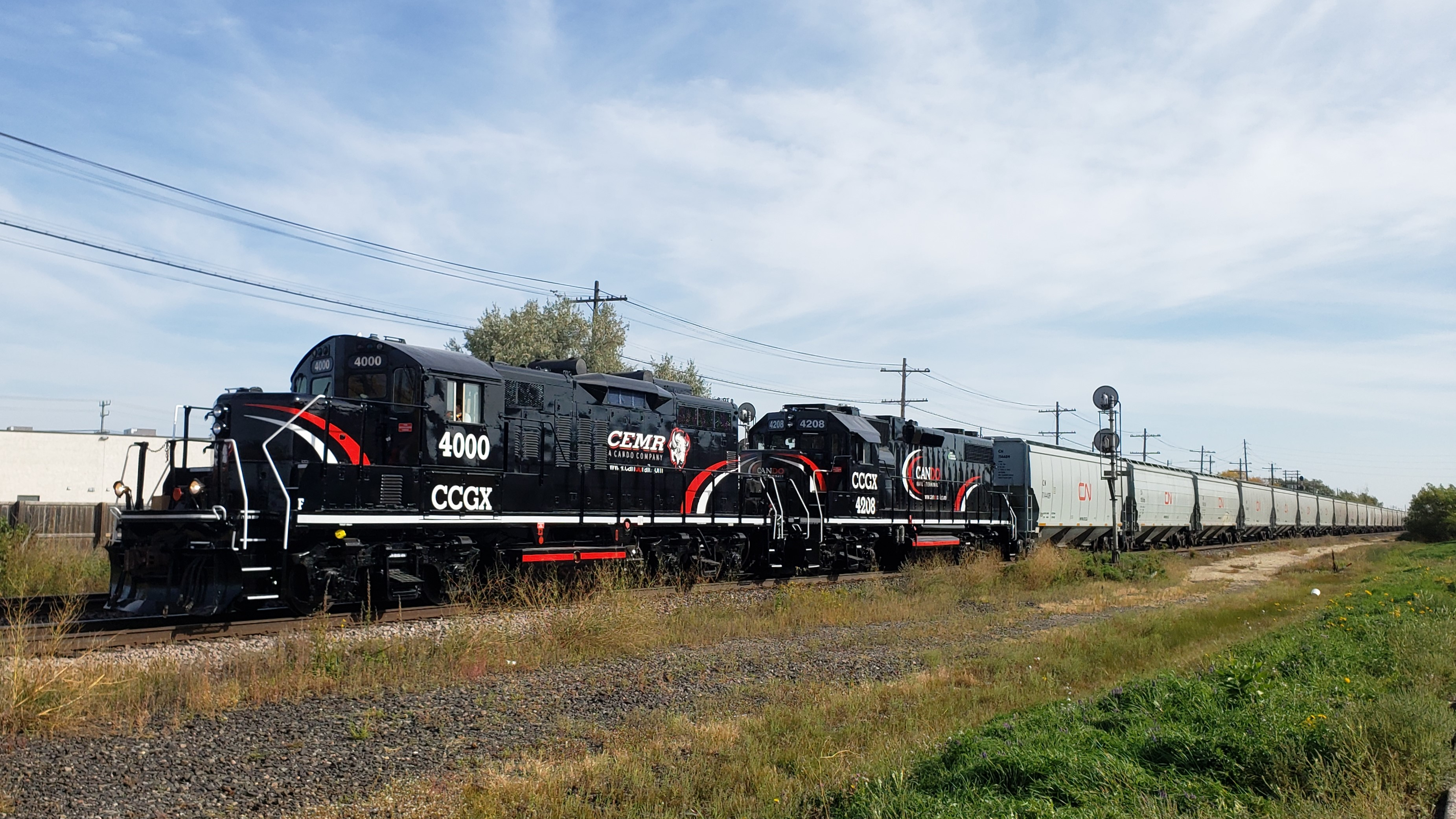
CCGX 4000 and CCGX 4208 at St. James Jct.

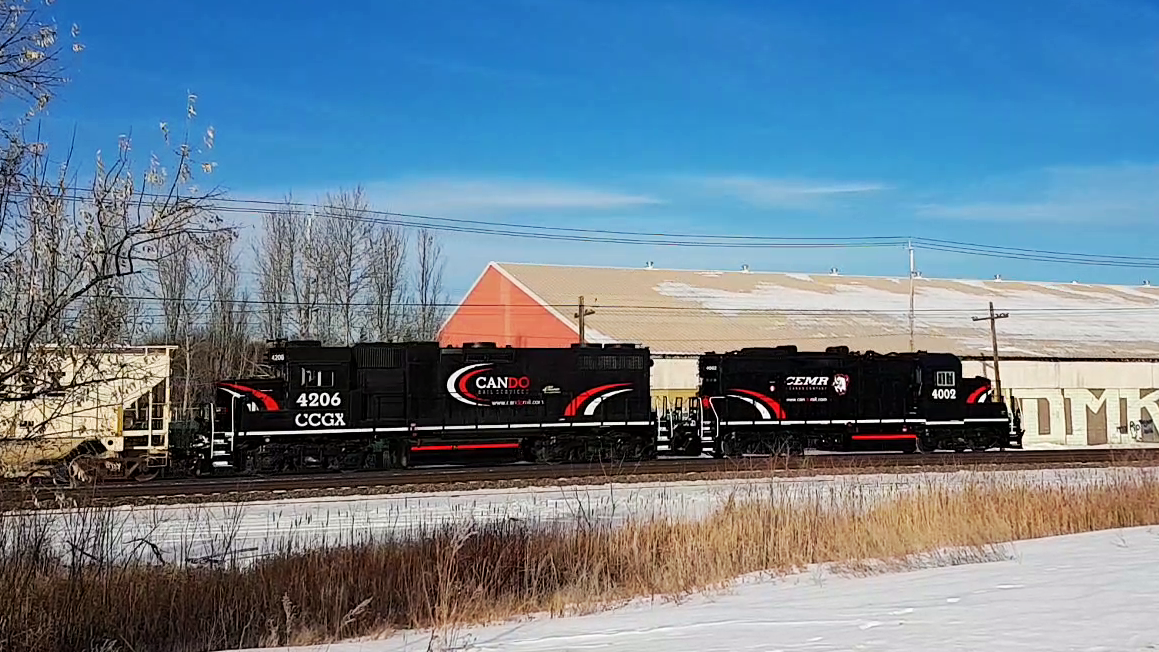
CCGX 4206 and CEMR 4002, bring a freight train into Winnipeg, Manitoba

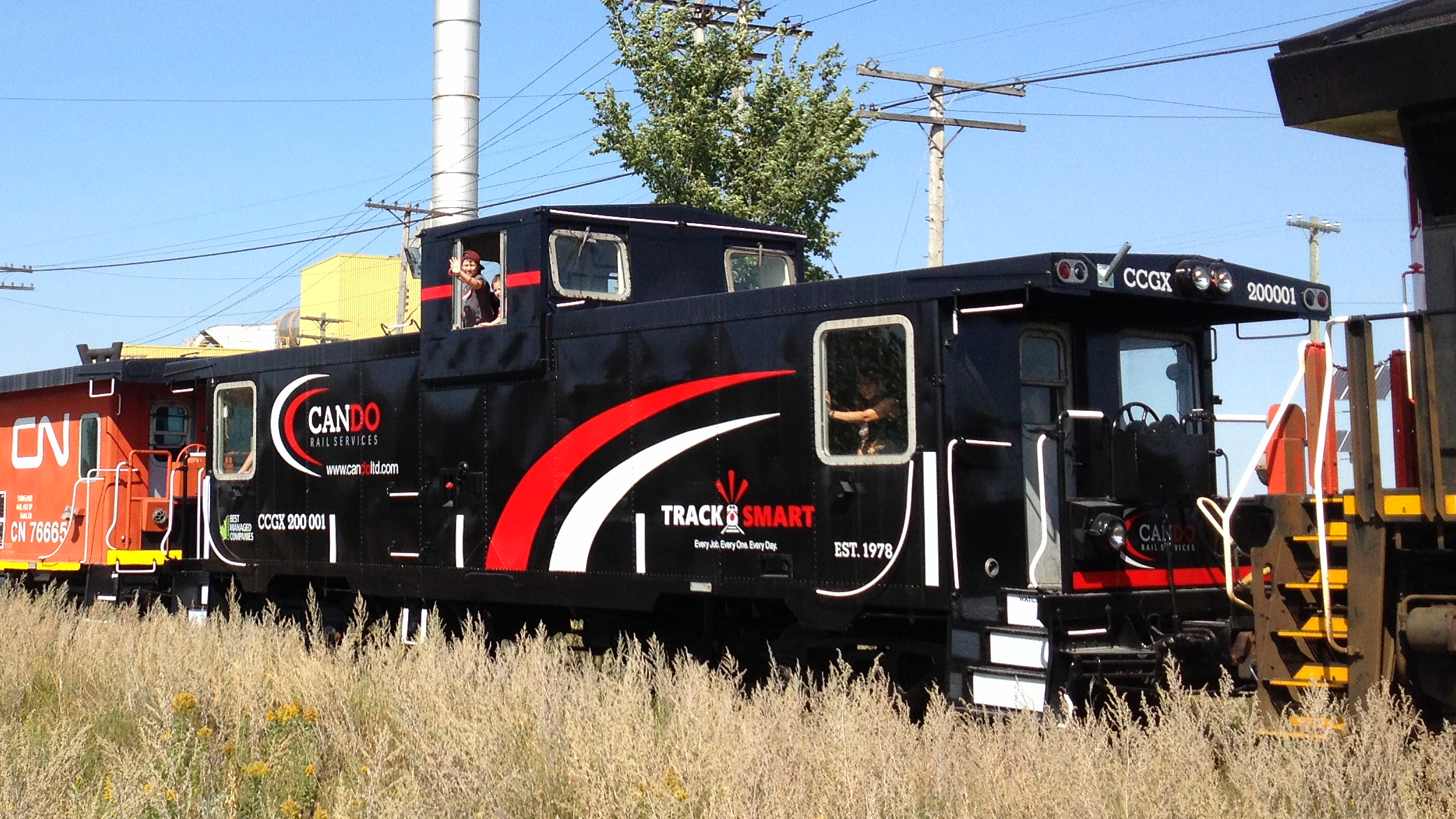
CCGX 200001 on a Canadian National Family Day Train on September 9, 2017
