= Non-status Indian =

Canadian First Nations person not registered with the government

In Canada, the term non-status Indian (French: Indiens non inscrits) (Note: Indian is used here because of the historical nature of the article and the precision of the name, as with Indian hospital. It was, and continues to be, used by government officials, Indigenous peoples and historians. The use of the name also provides relevant context about the era in which Indigenous peoples in Canada were homogeneously referred to as Indians rather than by language that distinguishes First Nations, Inuit and Métis peoples. Use of Indian is limited throughout the article to proper nouns and references to government legislation.) refers to any First Nations person who for whatever reason is not registered with the federal government, or is not registered to a band recognized under the Indian Act.

For several decades, status Indian women automatically became non-status if they married men who were not status Indians.

Prior to 1955, a status Indian could lose their status and become non-status through enfranchisement (voluntarily giving up status, usually for a minimal cash payment), by obtaining a college degree or becoming an ordained minister.

The 2013 Federal Court case Daniels v. Canada established that non-status Indians (and Métis) have the same Aboriginal rights as status Indians, in that they are encompassed in the 1867 Constitution Act's language about "Indians". However, the 2014 Federal Court of Appeal decision "Daniels v Canada" overturned that verdict after the government appealed. In 2016, the Supreme Court of Canada upheld the 2013 verdict after a subsequent appeal on the 2014 decision. As a result, the federal government has jurisdiction and fiduciary duty over status Indians, non-status Indians, and Métis alike.

The number of self-identified non-status Indians is growing. This growth in population is not solely due to natural growth due to birth rates, but rather an increase in individuals beginning to self-identify as non-status Indians who previously did not self-identify in that way. A similar pattern has occurred with growing numbers of people self-identifying as Métis.

== See also ==
- Urban Indian
- Treaty Indian
- Detraditionalization
- Detribalization
- List of organizations that self-identify as FNIM governments
- Tribal disenrollment
