= John Taylor (Manitoba politician) =

Canadian politician in Manitoba

- Born: c. 1834; St. Paul's Parish, Rupert's Land
- Died: March 3, 1925 (aged 90–91); Headingly, Manitoba
- Occupations: Farmer, politician
- Spouse(s): Flora Campbell (1856-1872), Frances Jane Brown (m. 1873)
- Children: 22

John Taylor (c. 1834 – March 3, 1925) was a Métis farmer and political figure in Manitoba. He represented Headingly from 1875 to 1879 in the Legislative Assembly of Manitoba.

He was born in St. Paul's Parish, Rupert's Land, the son of James Taylor, chief fisherman for the Hudson's Bay Company, and Mary Inkster, and was educated at St, Paul's School. From 1852 to 1856, Taylor taught school at Oxford House, at Norway House and at the parish school in Headingley. In 1856, he bought land on the Assiniboine River. Taylor represented Headingly as a member of the Convention of Forty in 1870. He was part of the armed party from Portage la Prairie that was imprisoned by Louis Riel in February 1870. He was elected to the Manitoba Legislature in 1870 but was unseated after some votes were declared invalid. Taylor was elected in the general election that followed in 1875 and again in 1878. He was a member of the Manitoba cabinet, serving as Minister of Agriculture. Taylor also was a justice of the peace and served thirty years as a school trustee.

Taylor was married twice. In 1856, he married a Métis woman, Flora Campbell, with whom he had eight children. After her death in 1872, he married Frances Jane Brown in 1873; he had fourteen children with her.

He died at home in Headingley in 1925.

John Taylor Collegiate in Winnipeg was named in his honour.
