= Treaty Indian =

Canadian member of a First Nations band that signed a Numbered Treaty

In Canadian Law, a Treaty Indian (French: Indien des traités) is a First Nations individual who belongs to a band that is party to one of the eleven Numbered Treaties signed by Canada with various First Nations between 1871 and 1922. It contrasts with Indians whose bands are not party to a treaty (primarily in British Columbia) and with "non-status Indians", that is, people of Indian heritage who are not recognized legally as Indians. These treaties establish specific legal rights, benefits, and obligations between the federal government and Treaty Indians, including annuities, education provisions, and hunting or fishing rights. Individuals holding this status are registered under the federal Indian Act, making them legally distinguishable from Inuit and Métis peoples within Canada.

== See also ==
- List of organizations that self-identify as FNIM governments
- Non-status Indian
- Treaty rights
