= Rural Municipality of Headingley =

Rural municipality in Manitoba, Canada

- Municipality

- Location of the RM of Headingley in Manitoba
- Coordinates: 49°52′05″N 97°23′27″W
- Country: Canada
- Province: Manitoba
- Region: Winnipeg Metro Region
- First settled: 1880
- Incorporated: May 9, 1992
- Named for: Headingley, England

Government
  - Mayor: Jim Robson
  - MLA: Kathleen Cook (Roblin)
  - MP: Doug Eyolfson (Winnipeg West)

Area
  - Municipality: 107.53 km^{2} (41.52 sq mi)
  - Metro: 5,306.79 km^{2} (2,048.96 sq mi)
- Elevation: 238 m (781 ft)

Population (2021)
  - Municipality: 4,431
  - Density: 41.21/km^{2} (106.7/sq mi)
  - Metro: 778,489
- Time zone: UTC-6 (CST)
  - Summer (DST): UTC-5 (CDT)
- Forward sortation area: R4H and R4J
- Area codes: Area codes 204 and 431
- Website: rmofheadingley.ca

Headingley (sometimes incorrectly spelled Headingly) is a rural municipality in Manitoba, Canada. It is located directly west of Winnipeg and had a population of 3,579 people as of the 2016 census.

The Trans-Canada Highway and the Assiniboine River run through the municipality. The unincorporated community of Headingley is situated within the municipality along Manitoba Provincial Road 334 on the Trans-Canada Highway.

The municipality takes its name from the suburb of Headingley in the city of Leeds in West Yorkshire, England.

== History ==
The first permanent European residents of the present-day Headingley area are figured to have been Oliver Gowler (1814–1865) and his wife, Mary (Nee Lady Neville Braybrooke) (1816–1878), who came to Canada together in the fall of 1836, hired by the Hudson ’s Bay Company to work on their experimental farm at Red River.

First owning a farm in Fort Garry in 1846, the Gowlers fled westward after the 1852 Red River flood, whereupon they began the first farm on Headingley soil. There, Oliver Gowler eventually became one of the most successful early farmers in what would become western Canada. James Cunningham, a member of Manitoba’s first Legislature (1870), also arrived in the area in 1853 following the 1852 flood.

In November 1852, Reverend Griffith Owen Corbett was sent from England and was tasked with organizing a new parish west of the Parish of St. James, itself created in 1850. Corbett established the parish of Headingley, naming it after his sponsoring parish of the same name in Leeds, England, and immediately built a house where he conducted services.

In 1869, the area saw its first rope ferry, established at the Headingley Grand Passage. In the late 1860s, Reverend George Young, the first Methodist missionary in Red River, began to visit Headingley regularly.

Following the passing of the federal Manitoba Act on 12 May 1870, which created the Province of Manitoba, provincial elections were held in November that year, upon which John Taylor was declared the first M.L.A of Headingley, with a majority of one vote—though the new Attorney General appointed James Cunningham to the seat on a "technicality."

At this time, the area was divided, with north Headingley belonging to the Rural Municipality of Assiniboia and south Headingley to the RM of Charleswood.

In November 1904, telegraph service was extended to Headingley, but were still missing modern conveniences of a streetcar and voice telephone service. In 1911, Headingley received its first telephones, with 13 phones being listed in the first phone book.

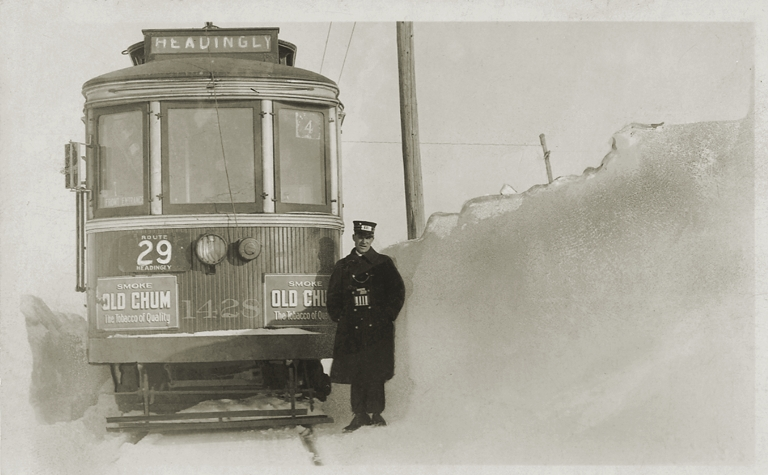
Suburban Rapid Transit Co. interurban in Headingley, Manitoba. Note the antiquated spelling of "Headingly" on the train.

In the early part of the 20th century, an interurban train, Route 29, operated by the Suburban Rapid Transit Company, Manitoba served the Headingley area; however, this line was discontinued in the 1930s. After the interurban cars stopped service, a diesel bus service was implemented. In the numbering of Winnipeg Transit routes since June 1984, Route 81 Headingley was the bus that serviced the area.

The Headingley Correctional Institution, a provincial gaol, was opened in October 1930 with an inmate population consisting of both males and females until 1931, when females were sent to Portage la Prairie. Capital punishment, via hangings, was carried out at the Institution from 1932 to 1952, wherein a total of 25 hangings took place.

=== Secession from Winnipeg to present day ===
From 1 January 1972 until 31 December 1992, Headingley was part of the City of Winnipeg. Initial discussions about Headingley seceding from Winnipeg began in March 1987 over concerns about municipal tax rates. A referendum was held on 14 November 1991 asking Headingley residents if they wanted to break away from Winnipeg.

It seceded from the larger city in 1993 after extensive complaints that the local needs of the mostly-rural community were not being met as part of a large urban city: they were not receiving water, sewage, access roads. Headingley residents wanted the City and Province to spend $4 million on extending water services to the community. As a result of the breakup, it is the only municipality besides Winnipeg in Statistics Canada's Manitoba Census Division No. 11.

In May 1993, the new municipality established its fire department, the Headingley Fire and Rescue Service, with Alan Gaye as Acting Fire Chief along with 20 volunteer firefighters. The department became operational by September 15 that year, using a 1966 F800 Ford Fire truck purchased for $7,800 from Winkler's department.

In 2013, the Manitoba government decided to divide a 1.7-kilometre (1.1 mi) section of the Trans-Canada Highway that runs through Headingley, because it was notorious for vehicle accidents.

==== Mayors/reeves ====
Since 1992, the Rural Municipality of Headingley has been led by the following reeves/mayors.

Term	Reeve
1992-1995	Jarl J. Johner
1996-1999	John M. Curry
2000-2016	Wilfred Remi Taillieu (1948–2016)
2017-incumbent	John Mauseth

== Local services ==
Police service in Headingley is provided by the Stonewall/Headingley RCMP detachment, along with the Headingley Highway Patrol who are responsible for the highway system in and around the Headingley region. A provincial jail is also located in the municipality, called the Headingley Correctional Institution.

In terms of health services, Headingley falls within the jurisdiction of Manitoba's Southern Regional Health Authority.

The municipality is serviced by a 25-member volunteer fire department, which includes a first responders unit and operates out of the Headingley Fire Hall. Headingley is also a member of the Boyne River Mutual Aid Fire District, which provides backup and support services on an as-required basis.

For education, Headingley is home to Phoenix School, an elementary school (K-5) of the St. James-Assiniboia School Division.

=== Water ===
The Cartier Regional Water Co-op manages the water supply to the R.M. of Headingley, as well as several other nearby rural municipalities such as Cartier, Rosser, Macdonald. The Headingley Water Treatment Plant is one of two operated by the Co-op, the other being located in Cartier. Intake source water comes from the Assiniboine River via a pipe, from where it is then moved to a facility on the site of the Headingley Correctional Centre River Intake Building where debris and silt are removed.

== Recreation ==
Camp Manitou is a summer camp and year-round outdoor recreation facility located in Headingley.

Headingley has two community centres: the older Phoenix Community Centre (153 Seekings Street), and the newer $1.8-million Headingley Community Centre (5353 Portage Avenue). Headingley also houses four small churches, including Headingley United Church and Holy Trinity Anglican Church.

The Headingley Grand Trunk Trail is the abandoned rail line that runs through both the Rural Municipalities of Headingley and Cartier from the Perimeter Highway to Beaudry Provincial Park. The railway bed was originally built by the Grand Trunk Pacific Railway and was used from 1894 to 1972. The municipality is also home to a heritage museum about the Canadian petroleum industry, called Jim's Vintage Garages Heritage Museum.

Headingley is home to Breezy Bend Country Club, which is a rotational host of the Manitoba Open professional golf tournament on the PGA Tour Americas.

== Demographics ==
In the 2021 Census of Population conducted by Statistics Canada, Headingley had a population of 4,331 living in 1,307 of its 1,342 total private dwellings, a change of 21% from its 2016 population of 3,579. With a land area of 107.53 km^{2} (41.52 sq mi), it had a population density of 40.3/km^{2} (104.3/sq mi) in 2021.

Total Headingley population
Year	Total
1996	1587
2001	1907
2006	2726
2011	3215
2016	3579

Distribution (%) of Headingley population by broad age groups
Group	Total	Male	Female
0 to 14 years	15.9	14.2	17.8
15 to 64 years	71.9	74.1	69.4
65 years and over	12.2	11.5	12.7
85 years and over	0.4	0.0	0.6
Average age of the population	39.3	38.5	40.3
Median age of the population	40.1	37.7	42.7

Visible minority (Note: "The Employment Equity Act defines visible minorities as 'persons, other than Aboriginal peoples, who are non-Caucasian in race or non-white in colour.'") population, 2016
Identity	Total	Male	Female
South Asian (Note: Such as, 'East Indian,' 'Pakistani,' 'Sri Lankan', etc.)	0	0	0
Chinese	20	15	0
Black	10	10	10
Filipino	0	0	0
Latin American	10	0	0
Arab	0	0	0
Southeast Asian (Note: Such as, 'Vietnamese,' 'Cambodian,' 'Laotian,' 'Thai,' etc.)	0	0	0
West Asian (Note: Such as, 'Afghan,' 'Iranian,' etc.)	10	0	10
Korean	0	0	0
Japanese	20	10	10
Visible minority, "not included elsewhere" (Note: "Includes persons with a write-in response such as 'Guyanese,' 'West Indian,' 'Tibetan,' 'Polynesian,' 'Pacific Islander,' etc.")	0	0	0
Multiple visible minorities (Note: "Includes persons who gave more than one visible minority group by checking two or more mark-in responses, e.g., 'Black' and 'South Asian.'")	0	0	0
Total visible minority population	55	35	25
Not a visible minority (Note: "Includes persons who reported 'Yes' to the Aboriginal group question..., as well as persons who were not considered to be members of a visible minority group.")	2,970	1,505	1,465

Aboriginal population, (Note: "Aboriginal identity refers to whether the person identified with the Aboriginal peoples of Canada. This includes those who are First Nations (North American Indian), Métis or Inuk (Inuit) and/or those who are Registered or Treaty Indians (that is, registered under the Indian Act of Canada) and/or those who have membership in a First Nation or Indian band.") 2016
Identity	Total	Male	Female
Population by identity
Aboriginal identity	190	100	90
Single Aboriginal responses (Note: "'Single Aboriginal responses' includes persons who are in only one Aboriginal group, that is First Nations (North American Indian), Métis or Inuk (Inuit).")	190	100	90
First Nations (North American Indian)	20	15	0
Métis	165	85	80
Inuk (Inuit)	0	0	0
Multiple Aboriginal responses (Note: "'Multiple Aboriginal responses' includes persons who are any two or all three of the following: First Nations (North American Indian), Métis or Inuk (Inuit).")	0	0	0
Aboriginal responses not included elsewhere (Note: "includes persons who are not First Nations (North American Indian), Métis or Inuk (Inuit) but who have Registered or Treaty Indian status and/or Membership in a First Nation or Indian band.")	0	0	0
Non-Aboriginal identity	2,835	1,445	1,395
Population by status
Registered or Treaty Indian (Status Indians) (Note: "includes persons who are a Registered or Treaty Indian. Registered Indians are persons who are registered under the Indian Act of Canada. Treaty Indians are persons who belong to a First Nation or Indian band that signed a treaty with the Crown. Registered or Treaty Indians are sometimes also called Status Indians.")	10	0	10
Not a Registered or Treaty Indian	3,015	1,535	1,480
Population by ancestry
Aboriginal ancestry (only) (Note: "includes persons who have First Nations (North American Indian), Métis and/or Inuit ancestry. It excludes persons with non-Aboriginal ancestry.")	0	10	0
Single Aboriginal ancestry (only) (Note: "includes persons who have only one of First Nations (North American Indian), Métis or Inuit ancestry. It excludes persons with non-Aboriginal ancestry.")	10	10	0
Métis single ancestry	10	10	0
Multiple Aboriginal ancestries (only)	0	0	0
Aboriginal and non-Aboriginal ancestries (Note: "includes persons who have First Nations (North American Indian), Métis and/or Inuit ancestry, as well as non-Aboriginal ancestry.")	290	175	110
Single Aboriginal and non-Aboriginal ancestriesCensus data footnote92	280	170	110
First Nations (North American Indian) and non-Aboriginal ancestries	80	60	20
Métis and non-Aboriginal ancestries	200	115	90
Inuit and non-Aboriginal ancestries	0	0	0
Multiple Aboriginal and non-Aboriginal ancestriesCensus data footnote93	10	10	0
First Nations (North American Indian), Métis and non-Aboriginal ancestries	10	10	0
Non-Aboriginal ancestry (only)	2,735	1,360	1,375

2016 Census footnotes:

== Notable people ==
- James Cunningham (c. 1817 – April 27, 1915), a member of Manitoba's first Legislature (1870) as the representative of Headingley
- John Taylor, a Métis farmer and politician who represented Headingley from 1875 to 1879 in the Legislative Assembly of Manitoba

== See also ==
- Headingley Correctional Institution
- Division No. 11, Manitoba
