= Brunkild =

Human settlement in Manitoba, Canada

Coordinates: 49.592°N 97.575°W

Brunkild is an unincorporated community located in the Rural Municipality of Macdonald in south-central Manitoba. It is approximately 48 km (30 mi) southwest of Winnipeg on Highway 3. Provincial Roads 305 and 332 also travel through the community, as well as the Central Manitoba Railway. A post office was established in Brunkild in 1903, the same year construction began on a railway from Winnipeg to the community.

== History ==
The original survey of Township number 7 in Range 2 West in the province of Manitoba was conducted by J. Doupe in 1871 and completed by J.A. Snow in 1872, who stated that the area contained level prairie with many marshes. The survey of Township number 7 Range 1 West took slightly longer. It commenced in 1871 with surveyors M. Hart, J. Doupe, and J.A. Snow in 1872 and completed in 1886 by R.C. McPhillips. These men recorded the area as being open prairie with occasional low spots.

In John Snow's own word written in December 1872 to the Honourable J.C. Aikins, Secretary of State for Canada:

"I have the honour to report the completion of the Survey of Township No. 7 in Range 2 West of the Province of Manitoba in accordance with my contract. About two-thirds of this township is occupied by the great hay marsh, over which the waters of Riviere-aux Glets de Boin must pass in spring to reach the Scratching River which may be said to have risen in this township. I saw but few spots which were not solid prairie soil and experienced no difficulty in driving oxen with heavy loads in every direction over the marsh. It provides a fine clean growth of grass from two to five feet in height at full growth and the surface is so smooth that a mowing machine can work well upon it. The richness of no better soil can be imagined If a channel was cut for the water of the Riviere-aux Glets de Boin where it enters the marsh to the Scratching River, these lands would be sufficiently dry for all purposes. In the south-west angle of this township, there is one block about eight square miles of beautiful high rolling prairie with an excellent sandy loam soil. This township is entirely destitute of wood."
