= Indian Register =

Canadian official record of those registered under the Indian Act

Secure certificate of Indian status

- Sample of a secure certificate of Indian status (often called an "Indian status card")
- Type: Personal identification document
- Issued by: Indigenous Services Canada
- Purpose: Identification; Travel document
- Valid in: Canada
- Expiration: 5 years (child); 10 years (adult)
- Cost: $0

The Indian Register is the official record of people registered under the Indian Act in Canada, called status Indians or registered Indians. (Note: Indian is used here because of the historical nature of the article and the precision of the name, as with Indian hospital. It was, and continues to be, used by government officials, Indigenous peoples and historians while referencing the school system. The use of the name also provides relevant context about the era in which the system was established, specifically one in which Indigenous peoples in Canada were homogeneously referred to as Indians rather than by language that distinguishes First Nations, Inuit and Métis peoples. Use of Indian is limited throughout the article to proper nouns and references to government legislation.) Indigenous people in Canada registered under the Indian Act have rights and benefits that are not granted to non-status Indians. Benefits include the granting of reserves and of rights associated with them, an extended hunting season, easier access to firearms, an exemption from federal and provincial taxes on reserve, and more freedom in the management of gaming and tobacco franchises via less government interference and taxes.

Those registered are provided with an Indian status card upon request, which serves as proof of registration as a status Indian, and facilitates access to certain benefits and cross-border travel with the United States.

== History ==
In 1851 the colonial governments of British North America began to keep records of Indians and bands entitled to benefits under treaty. For 100 years, individual Indian agents made lists of members who belonged to each band. In 1951, the current Indian Register was established by amendment of the Indian Act, and the many band lists were combined into one.

In 1985, the Indian Act was amended again with the goal of restoring First Nations status to people who had lost it through discriminatory provisions of the act, and to their children. Over 100,000 people who had lost their status in this way were added to the register.

== Registration under the Indian Act ("Indian status") ==
The list is maintained by Indigenous Services Canada. Sole authority for determining who will be registered is held by the Indian Registrar.

=== Revocation of status ===
The discriminatory reasons for revoking status were:

- marrying a man who was not registered under the Indian Act
- enfranchisement (until 1960, an Indian could vote in federal elections only by renouncing their status as a person who was registered under the Indian Act, i.e. their "Indian status")
- having a mother and paternal grandmother who were not registered under the Indian Act (these people lost status at 21)
- being born out of wedlock of a mother who was registered under the Indian Act and a father who was not.

=== Documentary proof of Indian status ===
Since 1956 the Canadian federal government has issued an identity document to individuals who are registered under the Indian Act. Traditionally these documents have been used by First Nations people in Canada to cross the border between Canada and the United States under the Jay Treaty. The document is called a certificate of Indian status or secure certificate of Indian status. It is often called a "status card".

== Indian status card ==
The Indian status card, formally known as the secure certificate of Indian status (SCIS), is an official identity document issued by Indigenous Services Canada to individuals registered under the Indian Act. It serves as proof of registration as a status Indian (registered Indian) and may be used to access programs, services, and rights available to registered First Nations persons under federal law. The card exists in both older laminated versions (certificate of Indian status) and the newer secure, credit card–style version, which includes security features and, since 2019, a machine-readable zone (MRZ) for travel to the United States.

Persons registered under the Indian Act, regardless of place of birth, have the right to enter and remain in Canada. Any valid version of the status card may be presented as proof of registration when entering Canada. The Indian status card can be used to travel to the United States; however, carrying a Canadian passport is always recommended when travelling outside Canada.

== See also ==
- Royal Commission on Aboriginal Peoples
- Congress of Aboriginal Peoples
- The Canadian Crown and First Nations, Inuit and Métis
- Canadian Aboriginal and Indigenous law
- Aboriginal land title in Canada

Compare with

- Blood quantum laws - the method of determining eligibility for treaty benefits in the United States
