= Howden, Manitoba =

Howden
- Location of Aubigny in Manitoba
- Coordinates: 49°43′6″N 97°7′34.4″W
- Country: Canada
- Province: Manitoba
- Rural Municipality: R.M. of Ritchot

Government
  - Mayor: Chris Ewen
  - Councillor (Ward 4): Janine Boulanger
  - MP (Provencher): Ted Falk (CPC)
  - MLA (Springfield-Ritchot): Ron Schuler (PC)
- Time zone: UTC−6 (CST)
  - Summer (DST): UTC−5 (CDT)

Howden is a hamlet in the province of Manitoba, Canada. It is located 17 kilometres (11 miles) south of downtown Winnipeg within the Rural Municipality of Ritchot.

== Etymology ==
Howden is named for James H. Howden, who was the Provincial Treasurer in the government of Sir Rodmond Roblin.

== History ==
In 1898, St. François de Sales School was opened in Howden, which burnt down in 1939 and was replaced by Queen Elizabeth School, named for Queen Elizabeth The Queen Mother. The new school was rebuilt in 1950, after the flood of that year, and again in 1955 after it was destroyed by fire, finally closing in 1967. A post office was opened in 1927, which was closed in 1948.

=== Churches ===
A Roman Catholic church was completed in 1908, which was replaced in 1950 or 1951, which itself was replaced in the early 1960s. It was restored after being heavily damaged in the 1997 flood, but was closed in 2007 and was moved to Oakbank in 2013. A Ukrainian Catholic church was opened in 1909, which was replaced in 1959. It was destroyed in the 1997 flood, and replaced by a chapel in 1999.
