= La Salle, Manitoba =

Bedroom community in the Winnipeg Metro Region

La Salle
- Town
- Location within Manitoba
- Coordinates: 49°41′35″N 97°15′50″W
- Country: Canada
- Region: Winnipeg Metro Region

Area
  - Total: 1.5 km^{2} (0.58 sq mi)
- Elevation: 233 m (764 ft)

Population (2016)
  - Total: 1,589
  - Density: 1,100/km^{2} (2,700/sq mi)
- Postal Code: R0G 1B0
- Area codes: Area codes 204 and 431

La Salle, Manitoba is unincorporated community located in the Rural Municipality of Macdonald along the banks of the La Salle River, about 30 kilometres (19 mi) south of downtown Winnipeg.

As of the 2016 Canadian Census, 1,589 people make La Salle their home.

== History ==
Prior to the CPR's laying rails on or about September 5, 1882, the Roman Catholic Church purchased land to establish the St. Hyacinthe Seminary. This land was on the north shore of the Riviere Sale (La Salle River). This was where the Ferme du College (College Forum) began, on sections 24-25-8-1-E. It was not until 1897 that Msgr. Tache wrote to the Superior of St.-Hyacinthe Seminary in Quebec requesting someone to oversee the college. A young priest, Father Charles Beaudry, answered the call. He decided to move the struggling seminary closer to the railroad.

The area was inhabited by English and Métis families who had lain claims to the lands. The Métis gave the rights to work the land over to the English, but the English community was short-lived. The Roman Catholic Church purchased the land to establish the Parish of St.-Hyacinthe of La Salle. In 1891, the municipal council passed Bylaw 144, which formed the St.-Hyacinthe School District. In 1890, a store had also become a post office, and in 1902 a businessman built a grain elevator.

More French families came from Quebec to colonize the new parish. In the summer of 1892, the construction of the Maison Chapelle began. It would include a chapel, accommodation for a priest, and a classroom.

In 1893, the school moved to Maison Chapelle. During the next decade many families moved from the east, swelling the population to 271 "souls" by 1905. The La Salle region was known for its rich land suitable for cultivation. Many early farmers began by raising cattle, chickens, and sheep. They soon began plowing the land with ox or horse. However, as the land was broken, potholes developed due to the flat prairie not having enough drainage. When it rained, the settlers discovered that the wet soil would stick to everything, leading to the soil being described as "gumbo."

In the early 1900s, steam engines were used to break up the land. The adaptation of farming technology has continued. In 1918, a lumber yard was established, and a garage in 1921. In 1924, local farmers organized a union to purchase bulk oil for their equipment and other needs. That same year the Catholic residents organized a chapter of the Knights of Columbus. The town built an outdoor hockey rink in 1925. With the arrival of new settlers, they built a Mennonite Church in 1930. By 1946, the community saw the addition of the La Salle Sports Club, and in 1953 the La Salle Caisse Populaire opened for business.

A community paper, The Villager was started in 1977. In 1984/85 the Multisports Complex was built. The La Salle Chamber of Commerce was founded in 1990 by concerned citizens in the area. It became an official member of the Manitoba Chambers of Commerce in 1995 .

Today, La Salle is the largest urban centre in the RM of Macdonald. With a population of approximately 1,589, the community members are active in establishing facilities and infrastructure that will meet the needs of the urban centre. The community is rapidly growing, serving as a bedroom community for the City of Winnipeg. La Salle Community Centre Inc., the La Salle School Parent Advisory Council, La Salle Nursery School Board, the Knights of Columbus and numerous other local volunteer organizations work together to raise funds for facilities and infrastructure to meet the needs of the community into the new millennium.

Local businesses contribute to the progressive and interactive lifestyle of the community. With the La Salle River winding through the community, activities can be pursued on a year-round basis. The community has some of the best recreational facilities in the municipality, including a community hall, curling rink, hockey rink, soccer and football fields, and baseball diamonds. The community also has the challenging 18-hole golf and country club.

== Demographics ==
In the 2021 Census of Population conducted by Statistics Canada, La Salle had a population of 2,687 living in 854 of its 870 total private dwellings, a change of 29.9% from its 2016 population of 2,069. With a land area of 6.97 km^{2} (2.69 sq mi), it had a population density of 385.5/km^{2} (998.5/sq mi) in 2021.
