= Starbuck, Manitoba =

Community in rural Manitoba

Coordinates: 49°46′20″N 97°37′02″W

Location of Starbuck in Manitoba

Starbuck is a community in Manitoba on the La Salle River, located within the Rural Municipality of Macdonald.

Starbuck is about a 25-minute drive from Winnipeg along Provincial Trunk Highway (PTH) 2. Provincial Road 332 runs north and south of town. The Canadian Pacific Railway's Souris line still runs through Starbuck providing the primary means of shipping grain out of its terminal. Passenger train service was halted several decades ago. Bus service to and from Winnipeg is provided three times per week.

Starbuck has two churches (Catholic and Lutheran; the local United Church community shares the Lutheran Church after a 2014 fire destroyed the United Church building), a community hall, skating and curling rinks, and an early/middle years school. Also, there is a butcher shop, a co-op gas bar/hardware store, a hotel, an insurance office, a credit union, a trucking company, a landscaper, a large grain terminal, an 18-hole golf course, and several other businesses in and around Starbuck.

== History ==
First Nations and Métis people had lived in the area well before the arrival of European families who began settling around Starbuck by 1870. In 1881 the railway came through and in 1885 the community was named Starbuck by the contractor who graded the railway roadbed. According to Geographical Names of Manitoba, the contractor's name was either Vanderstice, Vanderslie, or Vanzile. Also, it may be that Starbuck was named after Starbuck, Minnesota or a similarly named town in Germany. The Post Office was opened in 1887.

There is a long-held fable of Starbuck being named after two oxen, Star and Buck, who drowned in the La Salle River (formerly the Stinking River) where the community is now. However, this story is very similar to how Starbuck, Minnesota got its name. In the end, it might have been the Minnesota community was named after William H. Starbuck, a railroad financier from New York.

By the early 1900s, Starbuck was booming. Families from a mix of European heritages began settling in the area. The Métis reserve that was located west of town gave way to a number of these families. A large drainage project resulted in the Codner Drain which empties into the La Salle River. A passenger train came through twice a week. There were two general stores, a blacksmith, butcher, bank and hotel.

== Demographics ==
In the 2021 Census of Population conducted by Statistics Canada, Starbuck had a population of 363 living in 144 of its 145 total private dwellings, a change of 6.1% from its 2016 population of 342. With a land area of 1.26 km^{2} (0.49 sq mi), it had a population density of 288.1/km^{2} (746.2/sq mi) in 2021.

== Climate ==
Starbuck has a humid continental climate with severe seasonal differences, resulting in warm to hot summers and very cold winters.

Climate data for Starbuck
Month	Jan	Feb	Mar	Apr	May	Jun	Jul	Aug	Sep	Oct	Nov	Dec	Year
Record high °C (°F)	6.5 (43.7)	10 (50)	16.5 (61.7)	36 (97)	39.5 (103.1)	39 (102)	37 (99)	41.5 (106.7)	39.5 (103.1)	32 (90)	21.1 (70.0)	10.6 (51.1)	41.5 (106.7)
Mean daily maximum °C (°F)	−12.6 (9.3)	−8.3 (17.1)	−1.2 (29.8)	10.3 (50.5)	19.8 (67.6)	23.7 (74.7)	25.8 (78.4)	25.7 (78.3)	19.1 (66.4)	11.3 (52.3)	−0.9 (30.4)	−9.6 (14.7)	8.6 (47.5)
Daily mean °C (°F)	−17.7 (0.1)	−13.6 (7.5)	−6.3 (20.7)	3.8 (38.8)	12.1 (53.8)	16.8 (62.2)	18.9 (66.0)	18.2 (64.8)	12.4 (54.3)	5.3 (41.5)	−5.5 (22.1)	−14.2 (6.4)	2.5 (36.5)
Mean daily minimum °C (°F)	−22.6 (−8.7)	−18.8 (−1.8)	−11.4 (11.5)	−2.7 (27.1)	4.5 (40.1)	9.8 (49.6)	12 (54)	10.7 (51.3)	5.6 (42.1)	−0.7 (30.7)	−9.9 (14.2)	−18.8 (−1.8)	−3.5 (25.7)
Record low °C (°F)	−41 (−42)	−43 (−45)	−35 (−31)	−26.7 (−16.1)	−15 (5)	−3 (27)	0 (32)	−2.5 (27.5)	−7.5 (18.5)	−24 (−11)	−36.5 (−33.7)	−39.5 (−39.1)	−43 (−45)
Average precipitation mm (inches)	24.7 (0.97)	20.5 (0.81)	28.1 (1.11)	33.3 (1.31)	60 (2.4)	93.2 (3.67)	79.4 (3.13)	69.2 (2.72)	54.8 (2.16)	41.2 (1.62)	29.2 (1.15)	24.7 (0.97)	558.1 (21.97)
Source: Environment Canada

== Broadcasting Towers ==
Around 2002, Rogers Communications set up the "Rogers Communications Tower," as a transmitter for its CITI-FM and CKY-FM because Rogers engineers felt that the CBC-owned tower caused multipath distortion. Corus Entertainment owned CFPG-FM had originally wanted to install its transmitter on the CBC tower, but it was moved to the Rogers Tower, and decreased its ERP from 100,000 to 63,700 watts.
