= Domain, Manitoba =

Domain
- Unincorporated community
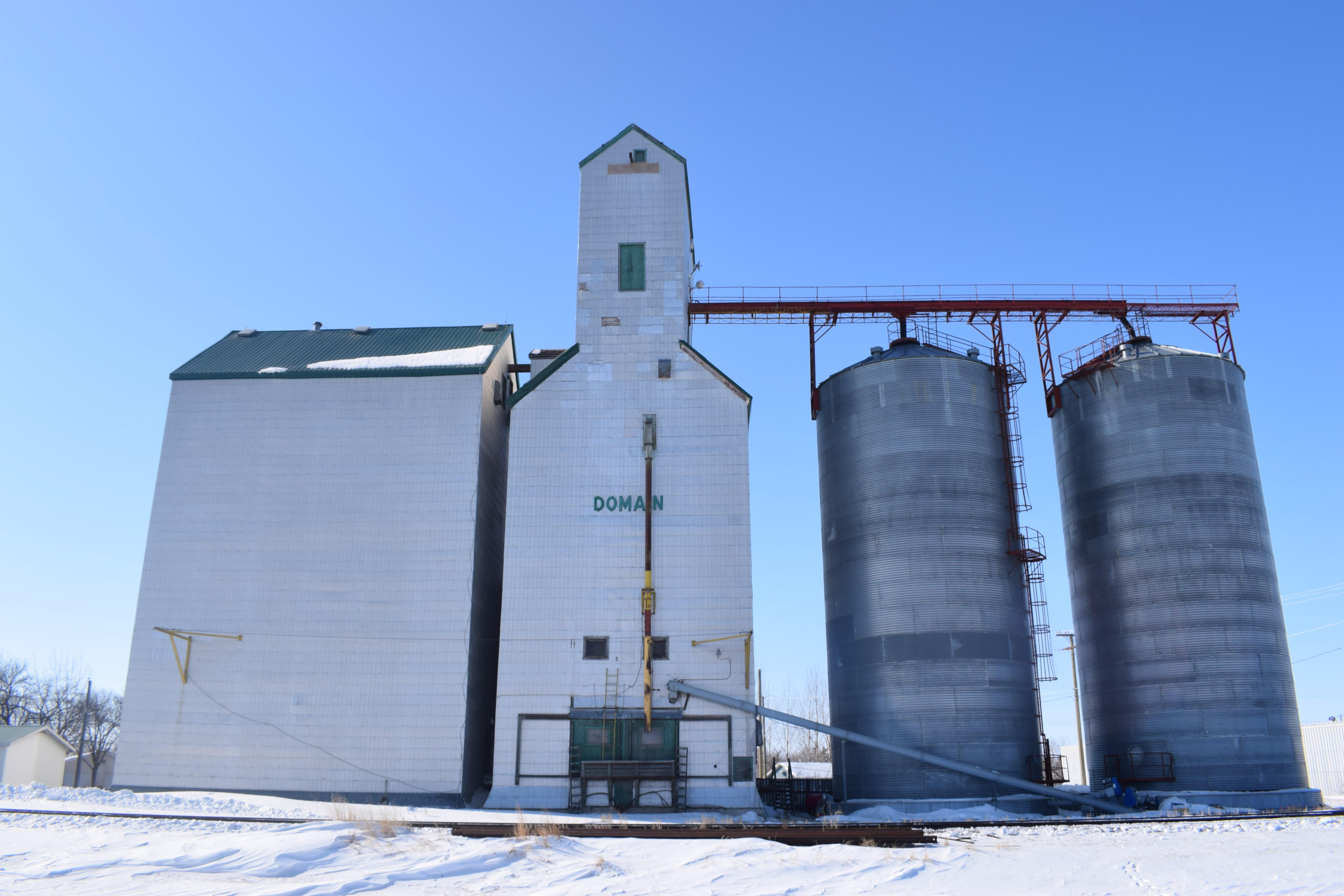
- The grain elevators in Domain.

- Location of Domain in Manitoba
- Coordinates: 49°36′46″N 97°19′19″W
- Country: Canada
- Province: Manitoba
- Region: Pembina Valley Region
- Rural Municipality: Macdonald

Government
  - MP (Portage—Lisgar): Branden Leslie
  - MLA (Midland): Lauren Stone (PC)
- Elevation: 238 m (781 ft)
- Time zone: UTC-6 (CST)
  - Summer (DST): UTC-5 (CDT)

Domain, Manitoba is an unincorporated community in southern Manitoba. It is located approximately twenty miles south of Winnipeg. Commercial activity in the hamlet includes a co-op store that sells gasoline, hardware and agricultural supplies. There is an elementary school serving children from the hamlet and the surrounding farming community.

In 1967, the Women's Institute published a history of the hamlet and district entitled "Down memory lane: a history of the Domain community, 1867-1967", which can be found online courtesy of the Our Roots project led by the Universities of Calgary and Laval, Canada's Local Histories Online. Subsequently, "Further down memory lane: Domain" was prepared by the Domain History Book Committee in 2002. Domain, Man. : Domain History Book Committee, 2002. 494 p. (F/5649/.D64/Fur)

"Down Memory Lane" chronicles the early history of the area and is rich with stories of floods, dances, fires, and the work of building a community. The first house in the area was built around 1882, around the time the Canadian Pacific Railway built its line running from Winnipeg to the United States. Early settlers came from Ireland and from the United States, including the Blanco family who traveled by covered wagon from Nebraska in 1900, a journey that is said to have taken six weeks. Subsequently, settlers were described as coming by the carload from the U.S. and July 4 picnics were a staple up to the First World War. In 1924–25, Mennonites began to settle in the community, fleeing Stalin's purges after the Russian revolution.

An agricultural community, its years were marked by drought, blizzard, bumper crops and floods. While never a large settlement, it has had its share of excitement, including a robbery in 1935, when a safe containing money for grain was taken outside the town and blown up.
