= Rural Municipality of Cartier =

Rural municipality in Manitoba, Canada

Cartier
- Rural municipality
- Rural Municipality of Cartier
- Location of Cartier in Manitoba
- Coordinates: 49.886°N 97.712°W
- Country: Canada
- Province: Manitoba
- Region: Central Plains and Winnipeg Metro
- Incorporated: February 21, 1914
- Named for: George-Étienne Cartier

Government
  - Reeve: Christa Vann Mitchell

Area
  - Total: 552.94 km^{2} (213.49 sq mi)
- Elevation: 239 m (784 ft)

Population (2021)
  - Total: 3,344
  - Density: 6.048/km^{2} (15.66/sq mi)
- Time zone: UTC−6 (CST)
  - Summer (DST): UTC−5 (CDT)
- Postal Code: R4K
- Area codes: 204, 431
- Website: rm-cartier.mb.ca

Rural Municipality of Cartier is a rural municipality in the Central Plains and Metro Regions of Manitoba, Canada. The municipality is bordered on the west by the RM of Portage la Prairie, to the east by the RM of Headingley, and to the north by the Assiniboine River. It is mainly flat rich farmland. Its main town is Elie.

It is named after Sir George-Étienne Cartier who was a leader in bringing Quebec into Confederation. Until 1914, it was part of the larger municipality of St. François Xavier.

== Water ==
The Cartier Regional Water Co-op manages the water supply in the rural municipality as well as other nearby RMs such as Headingley, Rosser, and Macdonald. The Cartier Water Treatment Plant brings in water from the Assiniboine River where it is cleaned of silt and debris and other toxins and distributed within the RM and also sent out to other nearby communities.

== Communities ==
- Dacotah
- Elie
- Lido Plage
- St. Eustache
- Springstein
- White Plains

== Demographics ==
In the 2021 Census of Population conducted by Statistics Canada, Cartier had a population of 3,344 living in 811 of its 850 total private dwellings, a change of −0.7% from its 2016 population of 3,368. With a land area of 552.94 km^{2} (213.49 sq mi), it had a population density of 6.0/km^{2} (15.7/sq mi) in 2021.

== See also ==
- List of francophone communities in Manitoba
