= Springstein, Manitoba =

Hamlet in Manitoba, Canada

Coordinates: 49°48′18″N 97°29′58″W

Springstein is a hamlet in the Canadian province of Manitoba, located in the Rural Municipality of Cartier, about 20 kilometres west of Winnipeg. It has been around at least since the 1930s. Originally it was settled by people who were part of the Mennonite church. There used to be a candle manufacturing company called Village Candle Company run by the Hogue family in their backyard of 21 Queen Street. Currently, the only public building is Springstein Mennonite Church. Springstein officially has three streets: Queen Street, Victoria Road, and Martin Crescent. Highway 424 (commonly referred to as "four-two-four" by Springsteinites) runs by the hamlet, but occupants of the houses along the highway aren't officially part of the formal town. There are about 52 houses in town, although there are several farms in the surrounding area that are generally considered part of the village.
