= Beaudry Provincial Park =

Provincial park in Manitoba, Canada

- IUCN category III (natural monument or feature)
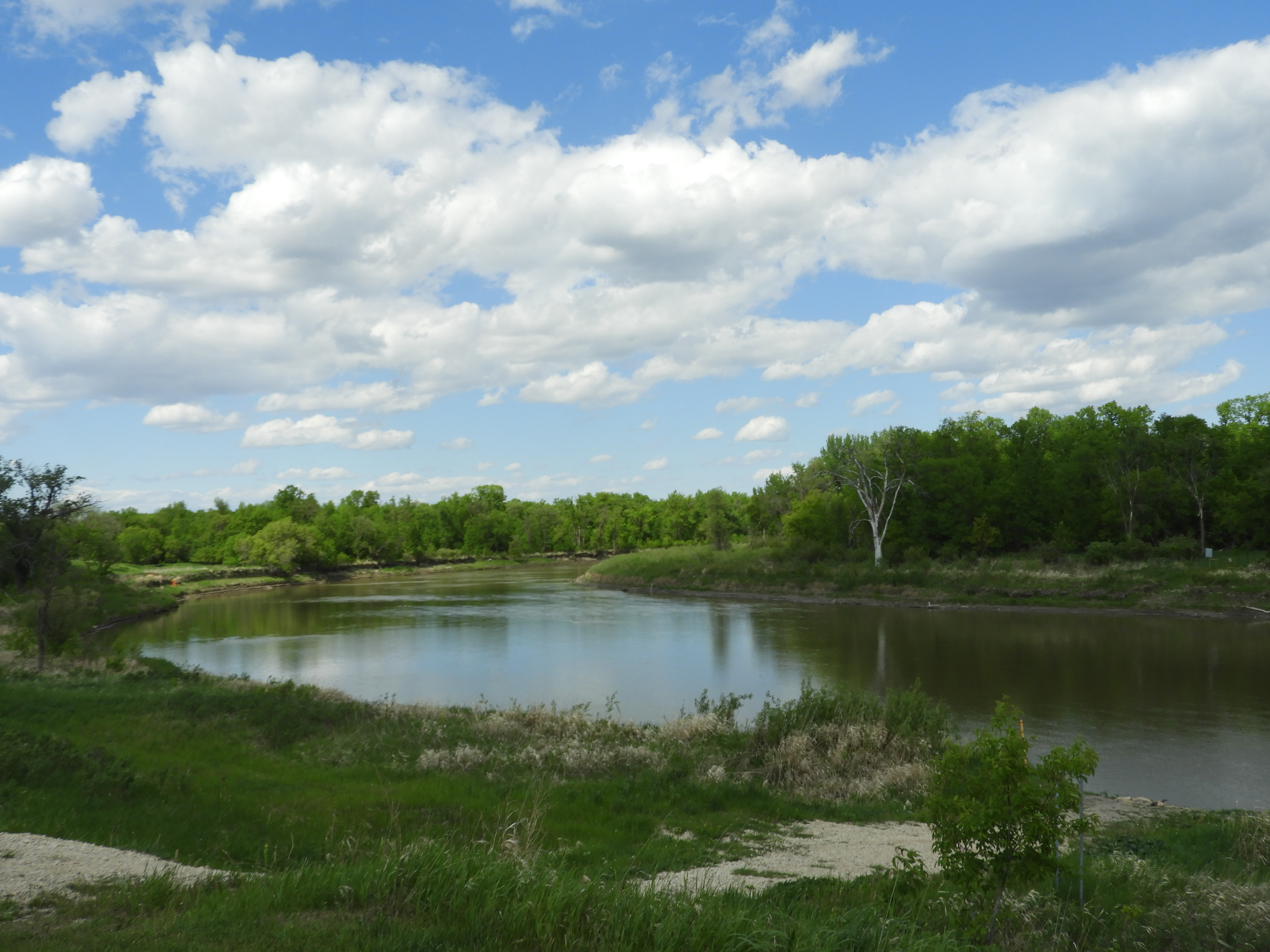

- Location within Manitoba
- Interactive map of Beaudry Provincial Park
- Location: Manitoba, Canada
- Nearest city: Winnipeg, Manitoba
- Coordinates: 49.861°N 97.478°W
- Area: 953.4 ha (2,356 acres)
- Established: 1974
- Governing body: Government of Manitoba

Beaudry Provincial Park is a 953.4-hectare (2,356-acre) park located along the Assiniboine River west of the town of Headingley, Manitoba, about 10 kilometres (6.2 mi) west of Winnipeg.

Beaudry Provincial Park was designated a provincial park by the Government of Manitoba in 1974. The park is considered to be a Class III protected area under the IUCN protected area management categories.

The park is located within the Winnipeg Ecodistrict in the Lake Manitoba Plain Ecoregion within the Prairies Ecozone.

== History ==
Beaudry Provincial Park was assembled from several privately owned landholdings along the Assiniboine River. The major portion of the park is a 2,000-acre (8.1 km^{2}) landholding featuring five miles (8 km) of frontage on the south side of the river that had been owned by prominent Winnipeg businessman, mining entrepreneur and civic leader John Draper Perrin. He had purchased a 1,200-acre (4.9 km^{2}) farm from England's Pilkington family (of Pilkington Glass fame) in 1944. The Pilkingtons had owned the property since the early 1920s. J. D. Perrin named the property Beaudry Farm, after Canadian National Railway's Beaudry Station, which was located adjacent to the farm on the CN line originally built by the Grand Trunk Pacific Railway and used from 1894 to 1972. The Beaudry name had derived from a family that had once owned large sections of land in the area in the early years of the 20th century.

After 1950, the property was jointly owned by J. D. Perrin and his son J. D. (Jack) Perrin. The Perrin property was expanded with the purchase in 1963 of the neighbouring 600-acre (2.4 km^{2}) farm to the East owned by the Les Fansett family. Around the same time, the Perrins had purchased from CN the abandoned Beaudry Station and relocated it to the bank of the Assiniboine River near the entrance to the present park's riverbottom forest hiking and skiing trails. These trails had been hand cut through the riverbottom forest area for horseback trail riding by Jack Perrin's children, John, Suzanne and Marshall. The station building was fully rehabilitated and used by J. D. Perrin and his wife Ruth as a country retreat until it was destroyed by fire during the winter of 1977. Jack Perrin and his family had constructed a country house on the riverbank a short distance south of the station house.

Under the Perrin family's ownership approximately 1,200 acres (4.9 km^{2}) of the Beaudry property were under cultivation, while the remaining 800 acres (3.2 km^{2}) of riverbottom forest and other natural forested habitats were carefully preserved. The entire holding was made off-limits to hunters. Much of the farming was done by Perrin's Farm Manager, Hilbrand Van Wyk, who with his wife Shirley and children were prominent members of the Headingley and St. François Xavier area community.

South of the CN line, along a small chain of "lakes", known locally by some today as Perrin Lakes, a dam had been built by Ducks Unlimited to preserve the wetlands and while prohibiting hunting, the Perrins permitted the Manitoba Gun Dog Association for many years to operate a seasonal clubhouse for dog training and trials.

== Prairie restoration ==
Beaudry Provincial Park is the site of a prairie restoration project begun in 1986 by Manitoba Conservation. The area restored was increased between 1987 and 1999, to 120 hectares (300 acres) in size.

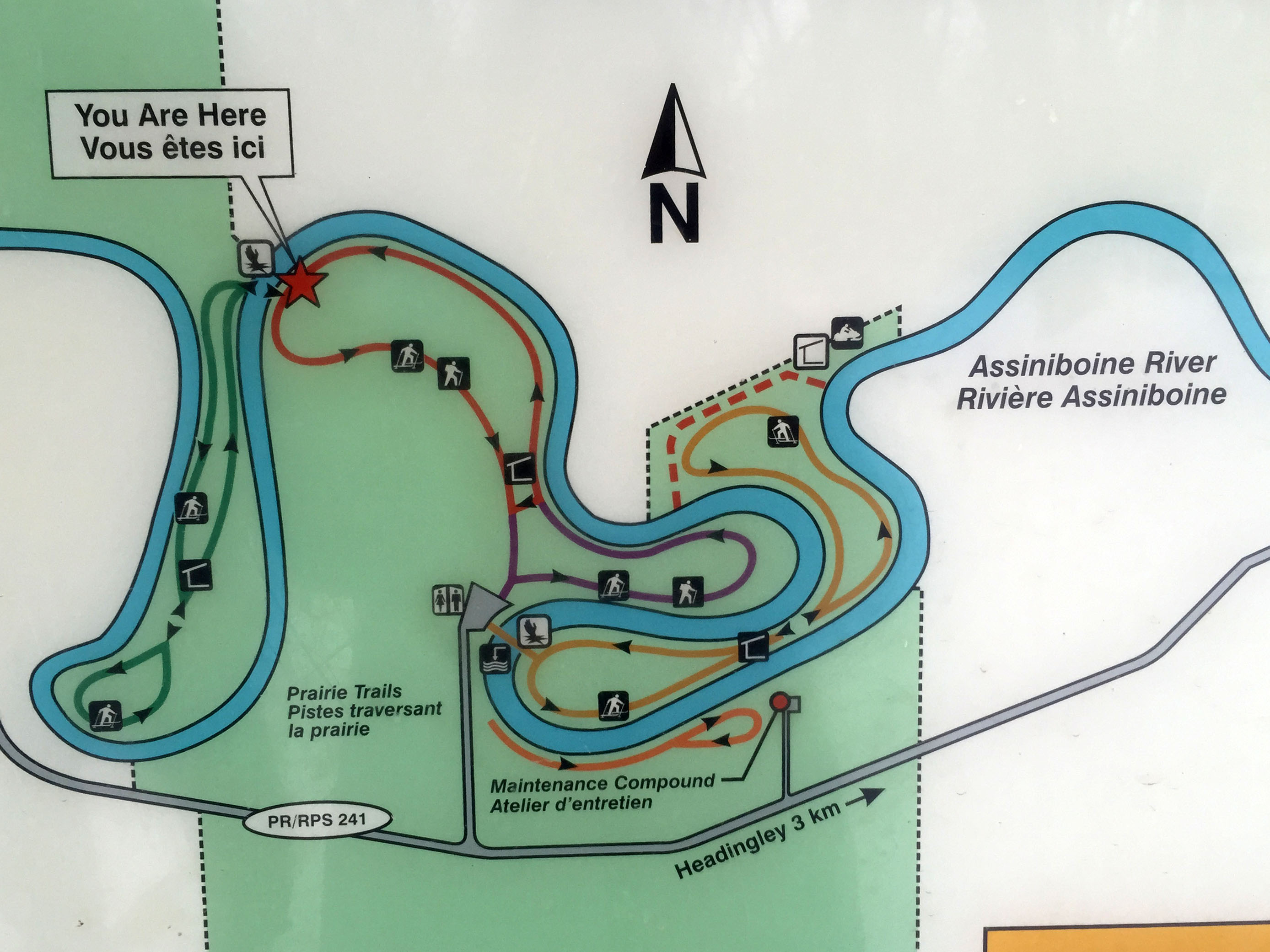

== See also ==
- List of protected areas of Manitoba
- List of provincial parks in Manitoba
