= Central Manitoba Railway =

Railway line in Manitoba, Canada

Overview
- Headquarters: Winnipeg, Manitoba
- Reporting mark: CEMR (CCGX for Cando Rail & Terminals locomotives)
- Locale: Manitoba
- Dates of operation: 1999–Present

Technical
- Track gauge: 4 ft 8 1/2 in (1,435 mm) standard gauge

Other
- Website: https://www.candorail.com/cemr/

The Central Manitoba Railway (reporting mark CEMR) is a Canadian shortline railway operating in the province of Manitoba.

The Central Manitoba Railway (CEMR) was created in 1999 by Cando Rail & Terminals to purchase the former CN Pine Falls (67 miles (108 km)) and Carman subdivisions (51 miles (82 km)). They run five days a week (weekdays) in the Norcran Industrial Area in North Transcona. They purchased a former CPR yard that was built in 1887–9 and built a new shop-house and diesel repair facility. They also repair cars for other railways.

They run on 115 & 132 pound per yard (50 kg/m) rail on the Carman sub, and 85 pound per yard (42 kg/m) light rail on the Pine Falls sub, one of the few light rail branches existing in Manitoba.

CEMR is a Unionized workforce represented by the Teamsters Canada Rail Conference (TCRC)

== Livery ==
=== 1999 - December 2017 ===
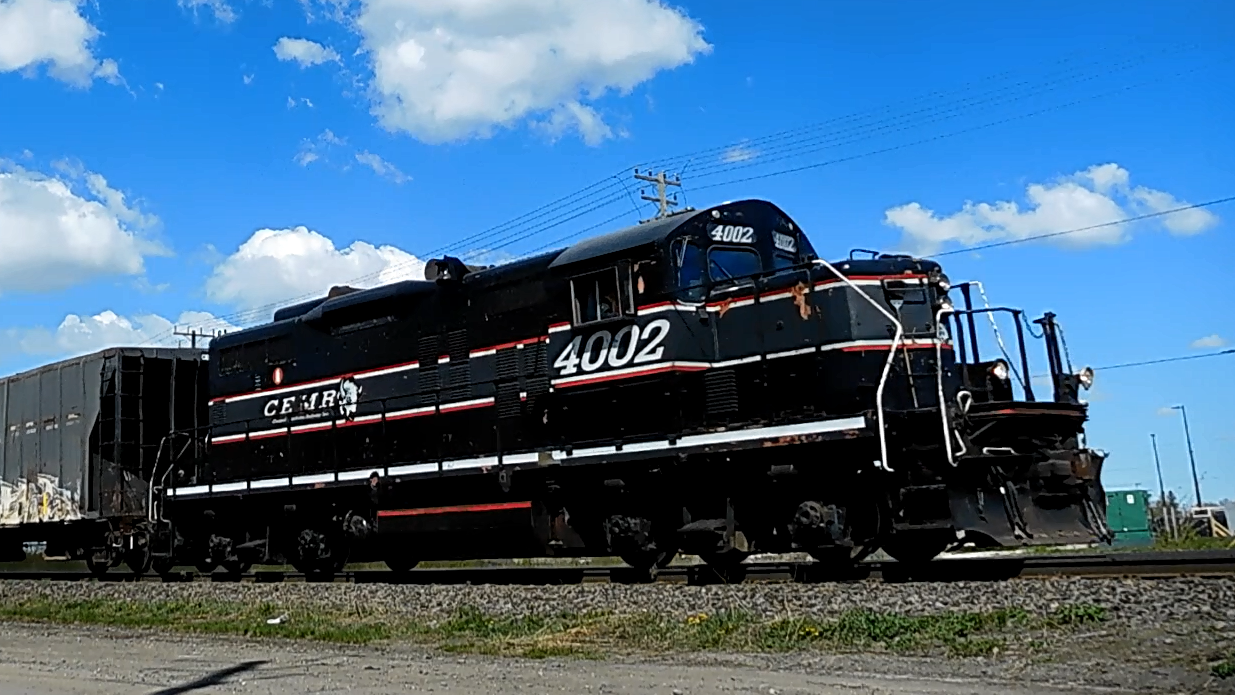
CEMR 4002 in CEMR's original paint scheme. May 7th 2016.

A black top and bottom broken by red and white stripes down the middle with the CEMR "bison" logo and a larger grey stripe and large white engine numbers on the sides under the windows of the cab.

=== December 2017 - Present ===
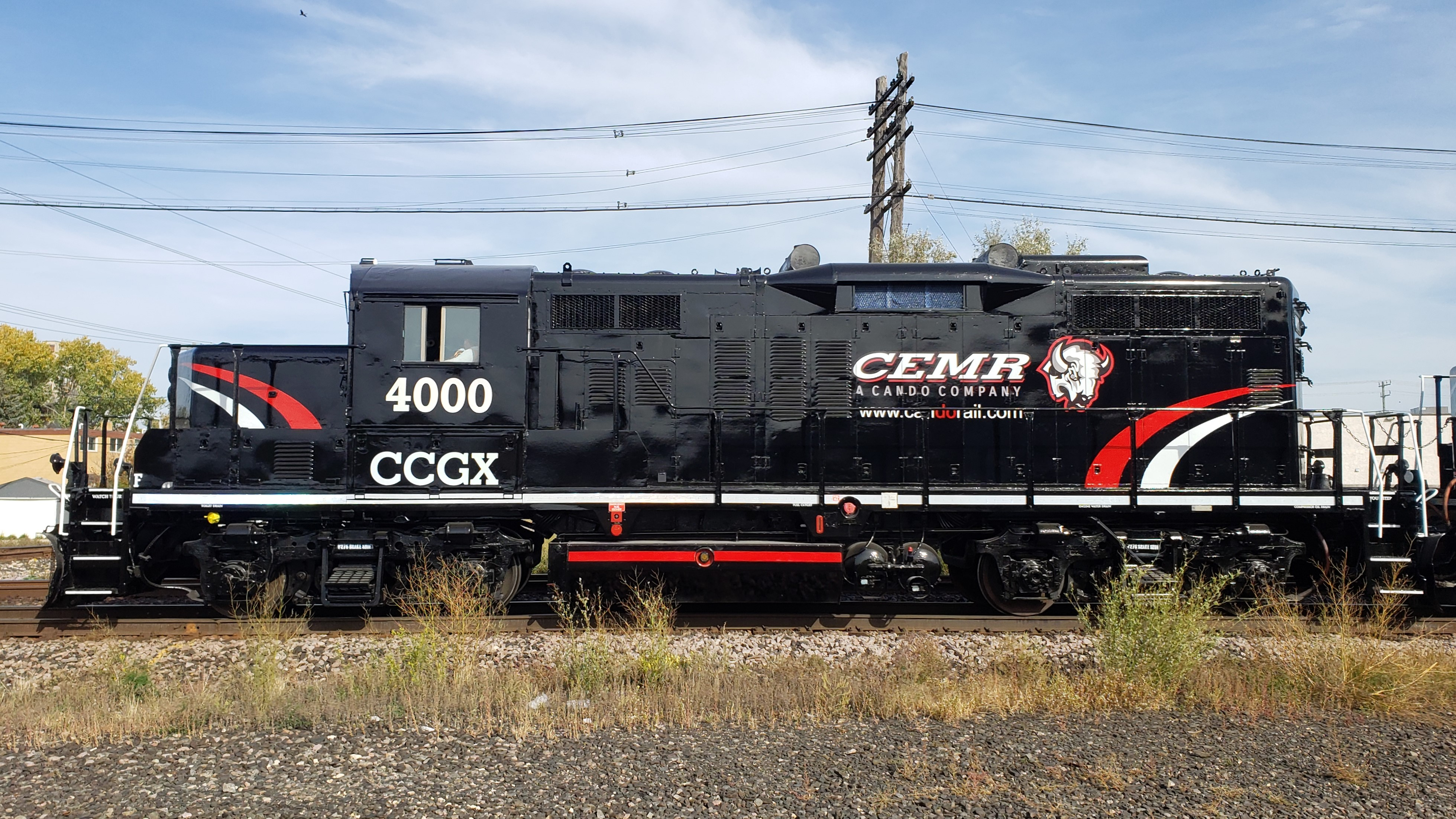
CCGX 4000 after being repainted in 2021. September 29th 2021.

Solid black with red and white curved stripes near the rear and on the nose of the locomotive, and a red line on the fuel tank. This base scheme, and the font of the numbers, match that of the CEMR's parent company, Cando Rail & Terminals. In the middle of the body is the CEMR "bison" logo, with the website of Cando underneath.

== All-Time Locomotives ==
The Central Manitoba Railway currently operates 16 locomotives.

Red = No longer on roster

Unit Number	Built	Type	Notes
CIT 3806	1959	GP38-3	Acquired 2015
CEMR 4000	March 1955	GP9RM	Ex-CN 4020, acquired 1999.
CEMR 4001	September 1955	GP9RM	Ex-CN 4025, acquired 1999.
CEMR 4002	April 1955	GP9RM	Ex-CN 4026, acquired 1999.
CEMR 4003	January 1958	GP9RM	Ex-CN 4007, acquired 1999.
CEMR 4004	1955	GP9RM	Ex-CCGX 4119, Exx-CN 4119. Became CEMR 4004 in November 2017.
CCGX 4010	January 1958	GP9RM	Ex-CN 4010, acquired 2004?.
CCGX 4011	January 1958	GP9RM	Ex-CN 4011, acquired 2004
CEMR 4012	January 1958	GP9RM	Ex-CN 4008, acquired 2004
CEMR 4013	July 1956	GP9RM	Ex-CN 4013, acquired 2004
CEMR 4014	November 1957	GP9RM	Ex-CN 4001, acquired 2004
CEMR 4081	June 1956	GP9	Ex-GTW 4446, acquired 2006
CCGX 4118	1955	GP9RM	Ex-CN 4118, acquired 2012
CCGX 4119	1955	GP9RM	Ex-CN 4119, acquired 2012, to CEMR 4004 in November 2017
CCGX 4201	?	GP38-3	Ex-UP, acquired 2015
CCGX 4202	February 1964	GP38-3	Ex-UP, acquired 2015
CCGX 4203		GP38-3	Ex-UP, acquired 2015
CCGX 4204		GP38-3	Ex-UP, acquired 2015
CCGX 5201	1971	SD38AC	Ex-DMIR 202, Acquired in 2015
CCGX 5232	November 1971	SD40	Ex-CN 5232, acquired 200X, moved to Prairie Rail Solutions in 2015
CCGX 5310	1978	SD40-2W	Ex-CN
CCGX 5311	1978	SD40-2W	Ex-CN 5311/DESX 5311, acquired 2014
CEMR 5396	1978	SD40-2	Ex-CN 5396, née CP 5784
CEFX 6056	October 1978	SD38-2	Leased Fall 2015, Ex- IAIS 156
CEFX 6057	October 1978	SD38-2	Leased Fall 2015, Ex-IAIS 157
CCGX 7061	1955	GP9RM	Ex-CN 7061, acquired 2012

== Gallery ==
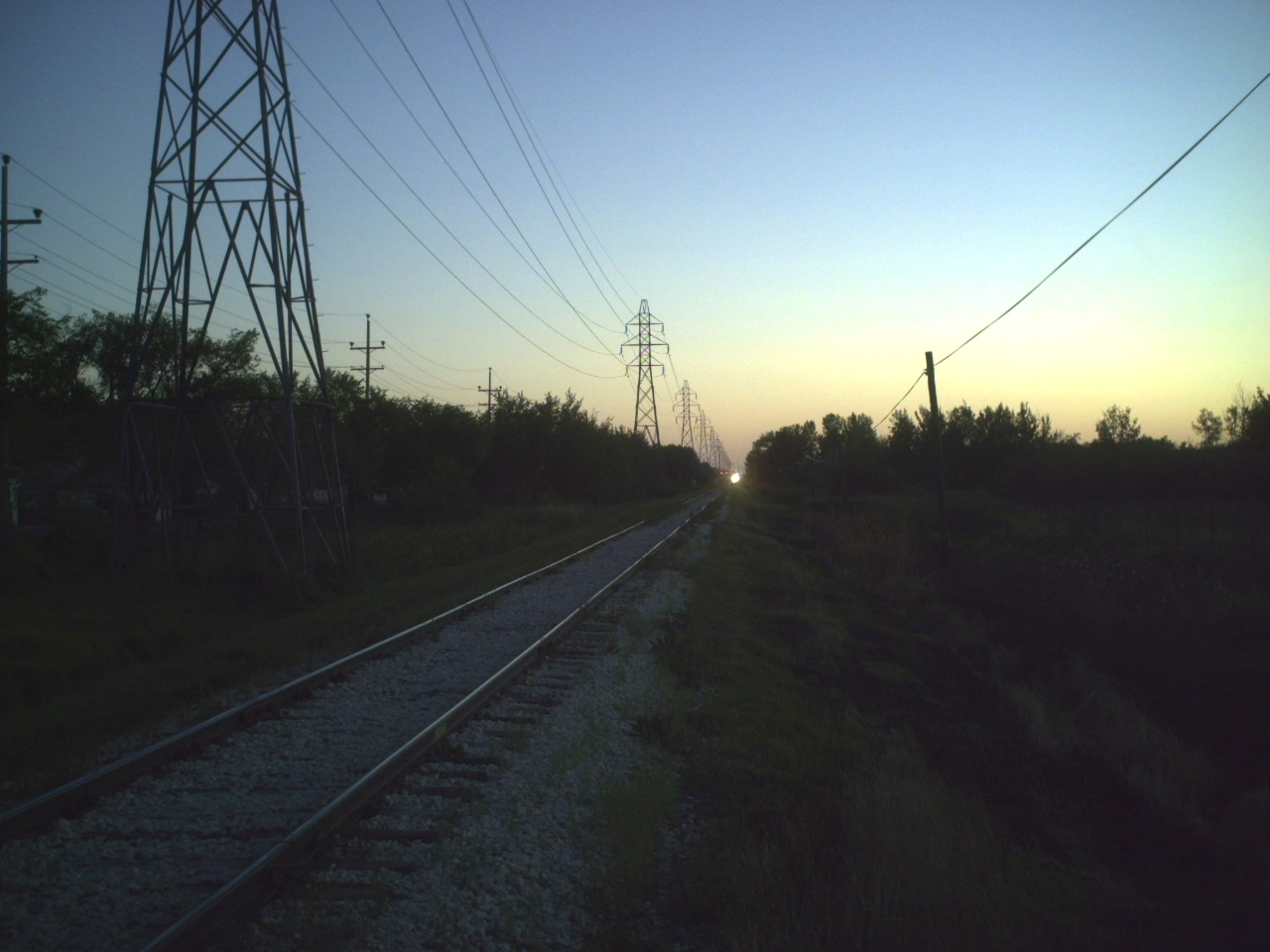
CEMR in the Evening by the Transcona Bioreserve

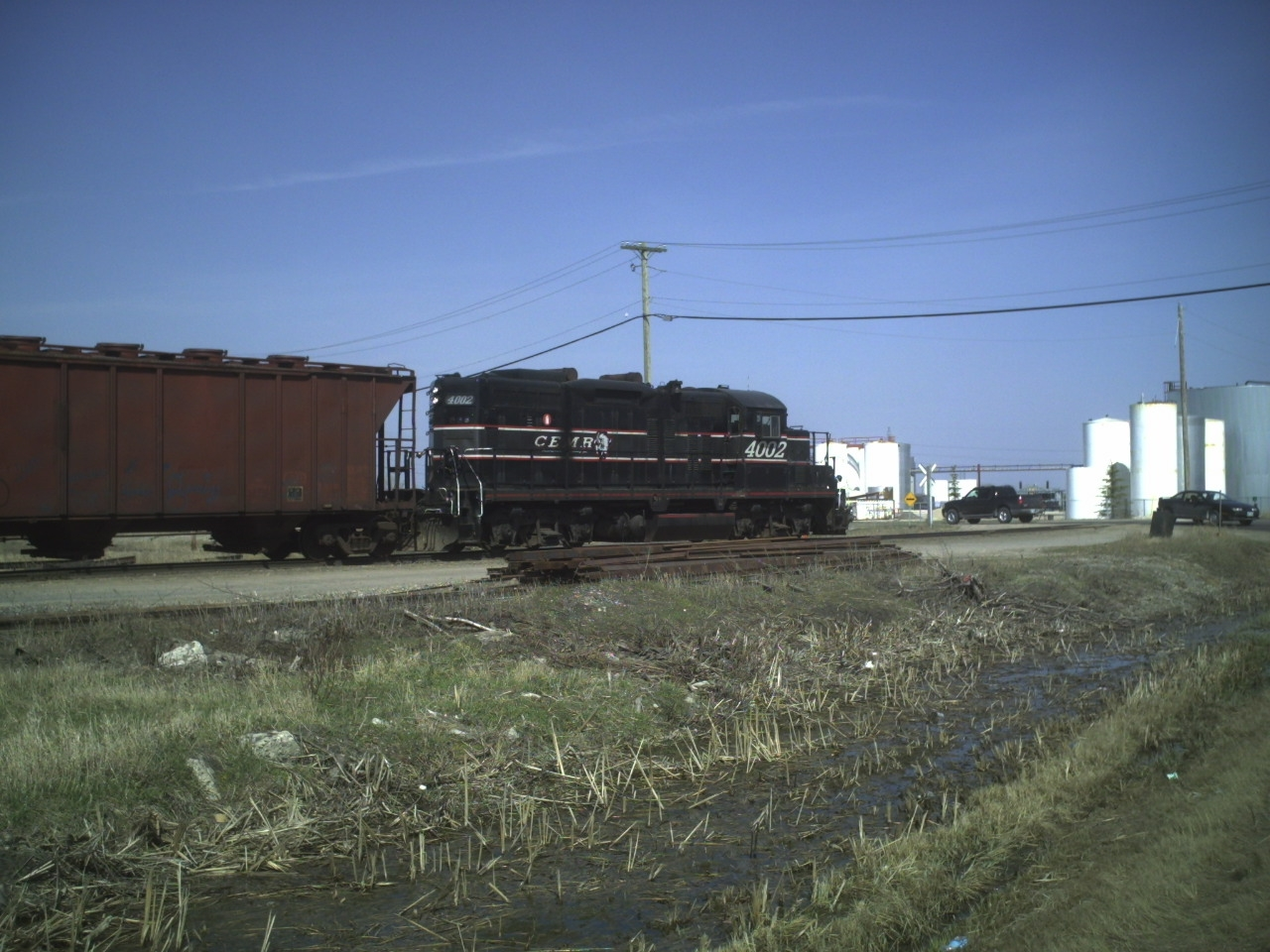
CEMR GP9rm 4002 at Transcona Yard

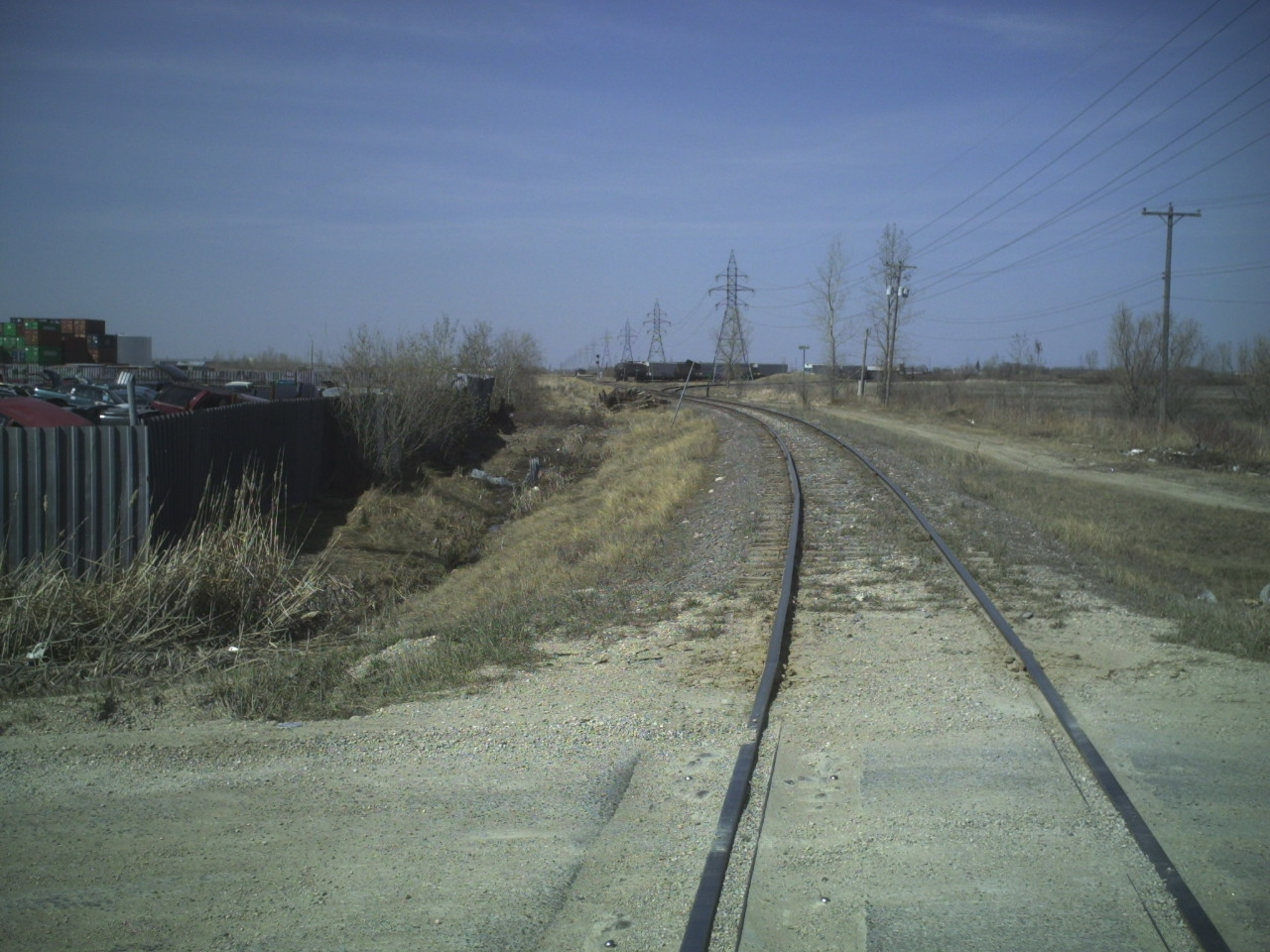
Pine Junction before the CPR Keewatin Mainline sub

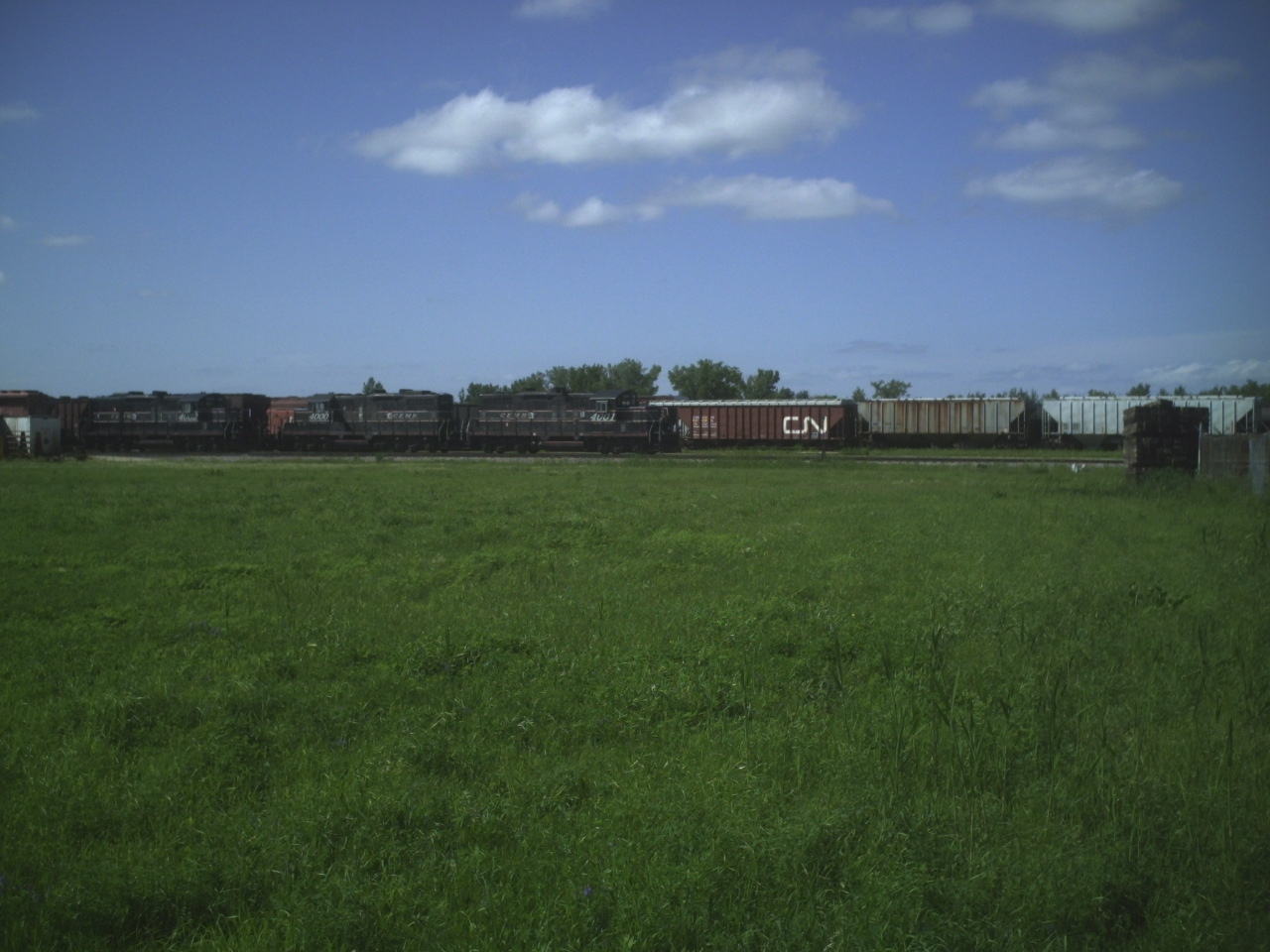
CEMR GP9's at Transcona Yard

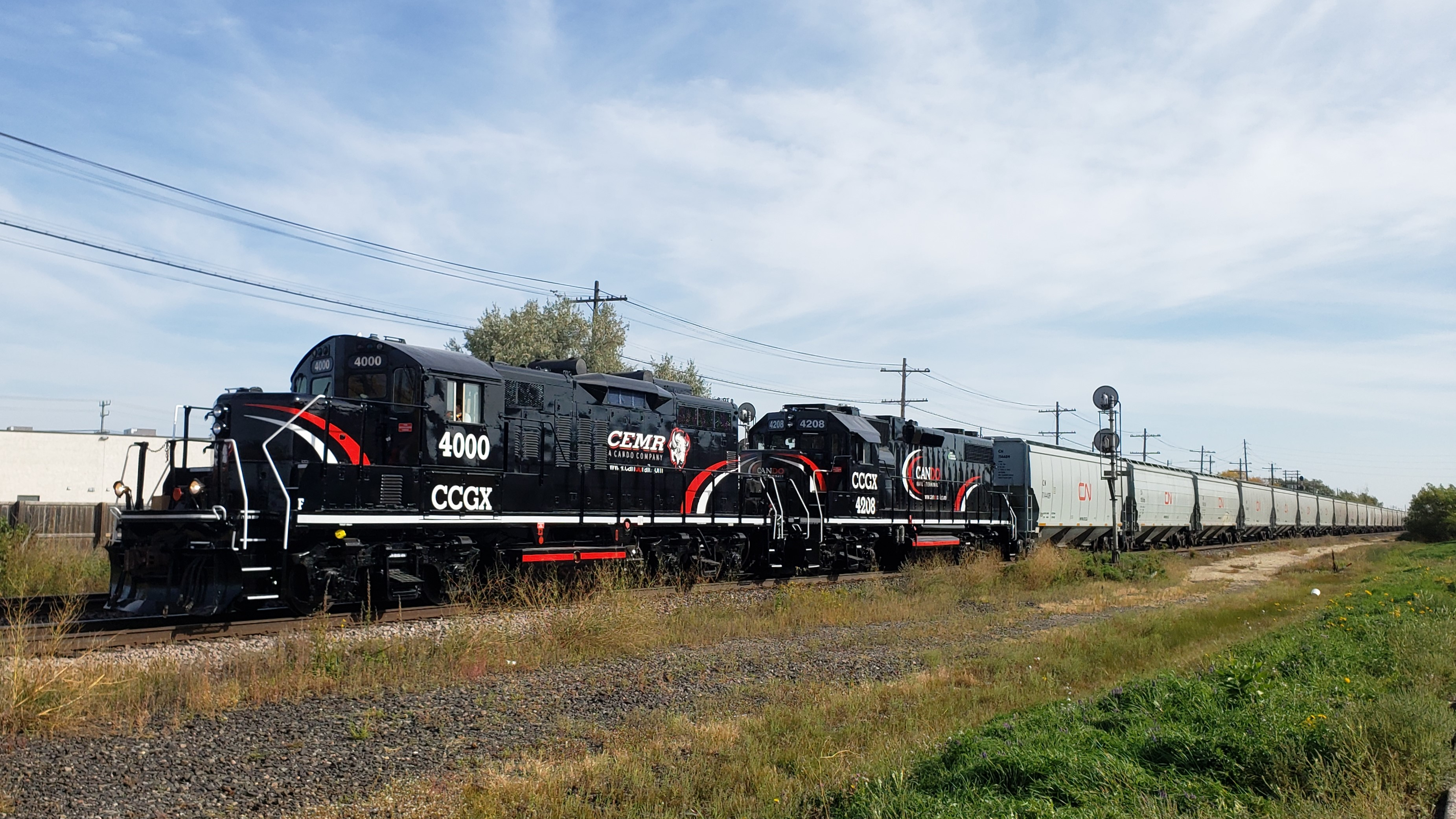
CCGX 4000 and CCGX 4208 leading a train west out of Winnipeg

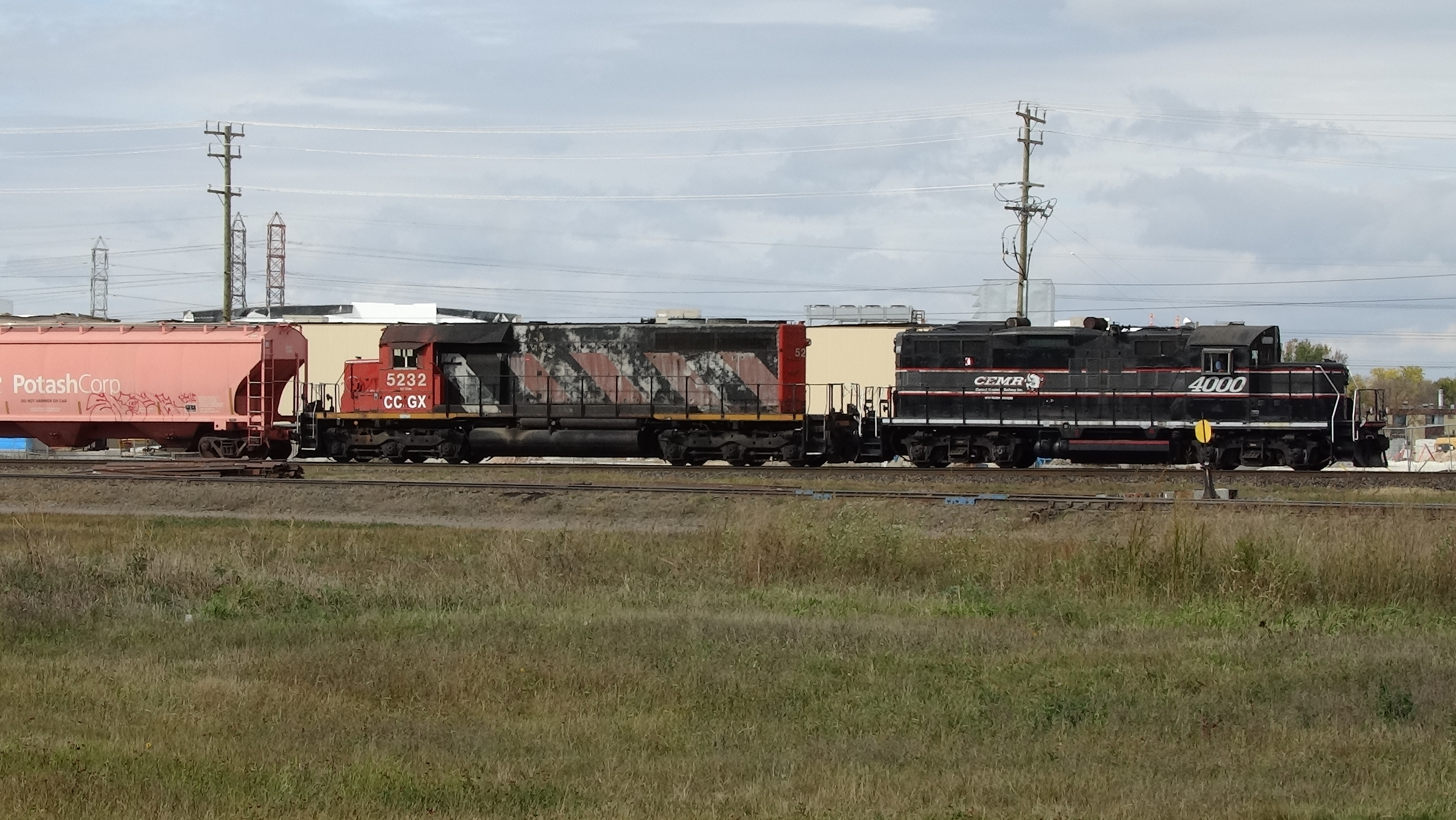
CEMR GP9rm 4000 leading Cando CCGX SD40 5232
