= Sanford, Manitoba =

Community in Manitoba, Canada

Sanford
- Community of Sanford
- Location of Sanford in Manitoba
- Coordinates: 49°40′57″N 97°26′39″W
- Country: Canada
- Province: Manitoba
- Region: Pembina Valley

Area
  - Total: 6.29 km^{2} (2.43 sq mi)
- Elevation: 268 m (879 ft)

Population (2016)
  - Total: 937
  - Density: 149/km^{2} (386/sq mi)
- Time zone: UTC-6 (CST)
  - Summer (DST): UTC-5 (CDT)
- Postal Code: R0G 2J0
- Area codes: 204, 431

Sanford is an unincorporated community in the Rural Municipality of Macdonald in Manitoba.

Sanford lies approximately 12 kilometres southwest of the provincial capital, Winnipeg. While it is generally considered a bedroom community with many residents commuting to Winnipeg for work, Sanford is also home to many farming families and small businesses. These businesses include the grocery store, the liquor/lumber store, Family Physio Therapy, carwash, insurance, accounting, and construction service provided. Sanford is also home to Meadowbrook (a small retirement community), a United Church, and a recreation centre.

Sanford is the site of the water treatment plant that serves the RM of Macdonald.

== Demographics ==
In the 2021 Census of Population conducted by Statistics Canada, Sanford had a population of 991 living in 390 of its 398 total private dwellings, a change of 5.8% from its 2016 population of 937. With a land area of 6.24 km^{2} (2.41 sq mi), it had a population density of 158.8/km^{2} (411.3/sq mi) in 2021.

== Education ==
Sanford Collegiate educates approximately 300 students, ranging from grade 9 to 12. Many students are bused in from surrounding communities including LaSalle, Oak Bluff, Domain, Starbuck, and Brunkild.

J.A. Cuddy School houses kindergarten to grade 8 students, and also has a daycare facility. J.A. Cuddy school was named after Dr. James A. Cuddy. He was born in the Sanford area in 1892, where he also received his elementary schooling. Outside the front of the school, there is an old school bell. This bell was the original bell from the Sanford Consolidated School, built in 1914. This bell used to be rung every day, but now it sits as a symbol, in front of the school, as a monument to the school's history. Due to an increased number of students, the school expanded to include four new classrooms, a new computer lab, and a large new gym. The school playground includes a play structure, swing set, soccer field, and baseball diamond.

=== High school sports ===
The premier sport at Sanford Collegiate is curling.

Men's team Championships: 2013-14 and 2017-18 Winnipeg Free Press Division Champions
