= La Salle River =

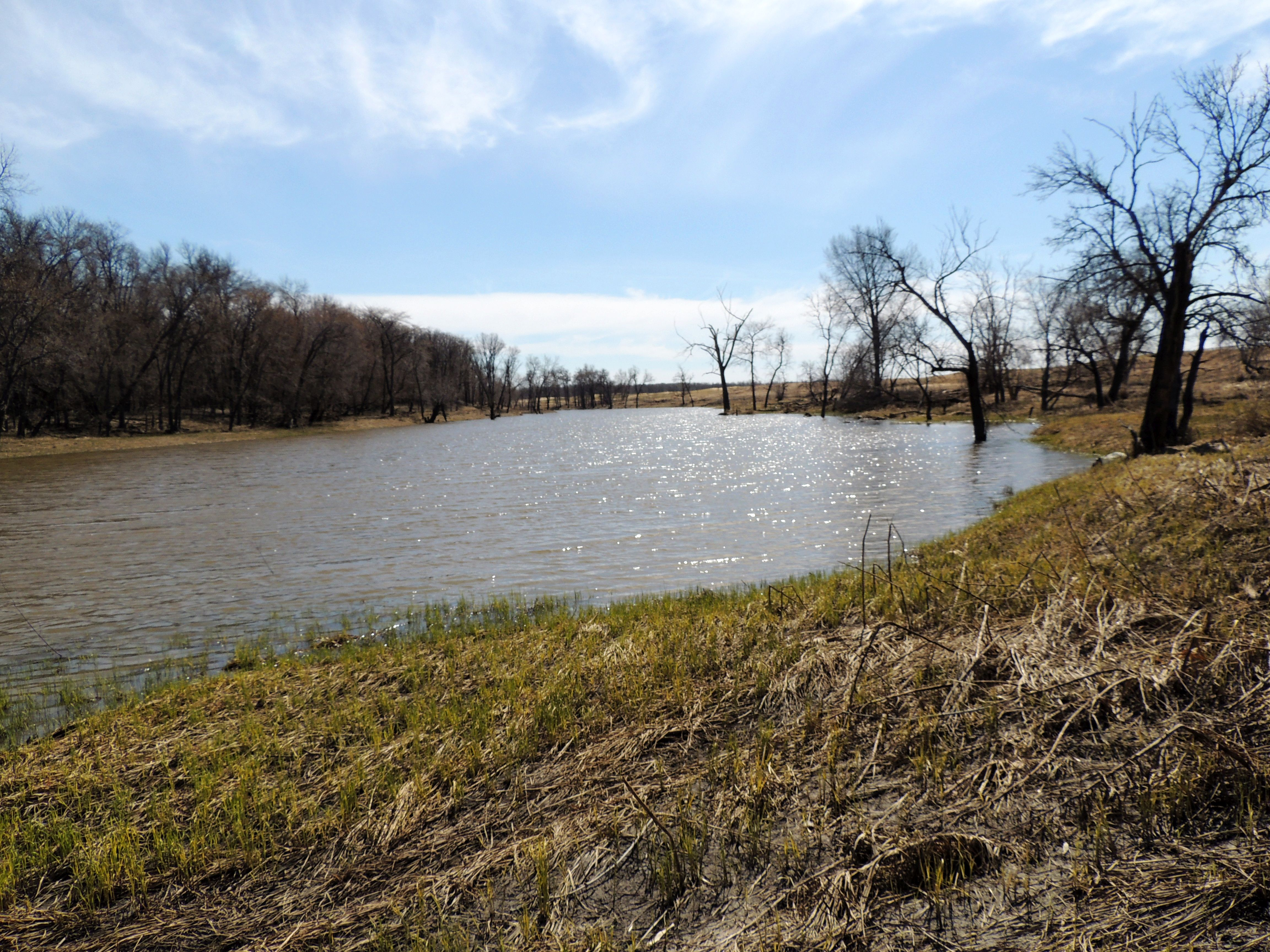

- Location within Manitoba

Location
- Country: Canada
- Province: Manitoba

Physical characteristics
- Mouth: Red River
  - location: Saint Norbert
  - coordinates: 49°45′22″N 97°08′29″W

The La Salle is a river in Manitoba, Canada, with its source near Portage la Prairie and terminating in the Red River in Saint Norbert (southern Winnipeg). The La Salle River flows mainly through agricultural land. It is a slow-moving, meandering prairie river with variable depth. It is the primary river that flows throughout most of the rural municipality of Macdonald.

On older maps, the river is named la Rivière Sale, la Rivière Salle, Salle River, or Stinking River.

It lies in the North American tectonic plate region.

== See also ==
- List of rivers of Manitoba
