= Rural Municipality of Macdonald =

Rural Municipality in Southern Manitoba

- Rural municipality
- Coat of arms
- Motto: Preserverate et Florete (Latin: Preserve and Flourish)
- Location of the RM of Macdonald in Manitoba
- Coordinates: 49°40′21″N 97°26′50″W
- Country: Canada
- Province: Manitoba
- Region: Winnipeg Metro
- Named for: John A. Macdonald
- Seat: Sanford

Government
  - Reeve: Brad Erb

Area
  - Total: 1,156.11 km^{2} (446.38 sq mi)
- Elevation: 232 m (761 ft)

Population (2021)
  - Total: 8,120
  - Density: 7.02/km^{2} (18.2/sq mi)
- Time zone: UTC−6 (CST)
  - Summer (DST): UTC−5 (CDT)
- Area codes: 204, 431
- Website: www.rmofmacdonald.com

Macdonald is a rural municipality lying adjacent to the southwest side of Winnipeg, Manitoba, Canada. It is part of the Winnipeg Metro Region, but is not part of the smaller Winnipeg census metropolitan area. Macdonald's population as of the 2016 census was 7,162.

The municipality is named for Canada's first Prime Minister, Sir John A. Macdonald.

== Communities ==
- Brunkild
- Domain
- La Salle
- Oak Bluff
- Osborne
- Sanford
- Starbuck

== Demographics ==
In the 2021 Census of Population conducted by Statistics Canada, Macdonald had a population of 8,120 living in 2,743 of its 2,815 total private dwellings, a change of 13.4% from its 2016 population of 7,162. With a land area of 1,156.11 km^{2} (446.38 sq mi), it had a population density of 7.0/km^{2} (18.2/sq mi) in 2021.

Panethnic groups in the Rural Municipality of Macdonald (2001−2021)
Panethnic group	2021		2016		2011		2006		2001	
Panethnic group	Pop.	%	Pop.	%	Pop.	%	Pop.	%	Pop.	%
European (Note: Statistic includes all persons that did not make up part of a visible minority or an indigenous identity.)	6,550	82.86%	6,220	89.75%	5,470	88.37%	5,345	94.6%	5,050	95.19%
Indigenous	690	8.73%	530	7.65%	485	7.84%	290	5.13%	135	2.54%
South Asian	235	2.97%	30	0.43%	35	0.57%	0	0%	20	0.38%
Southeast Asian (Note: Statistic includes total responses of "Filipino" and "Southeast Asian" under visible minority section on census.)	145	1.83%	55	0.79%	40	0.65%	0	0%	60	1.13%
African	70	0.89%	50	0.72%	75	1.21%	10	0.18%	20	0.38%
East Asian (Note: Statistic includes total responses of "Chinese", "Korean", and "Japanese" under visible minority section on census.)	60	0.76%	45	0.65%	70	1.13%	10	0.18%	30	0.57%
Latin American	45	0.57%	10	0.14%	0	0%	0	0%	0	0%
Middle Eastern (Note: Statistic includes total responses of "West Asian" and "Arab" under visible minority section on census.)	0	0%	10	0.14%	0	0%	0	0%	0	0%
Other/multiracial (Note: Statistic includes total responses of "Visible minority, n.i.e." and "Multiple visible minorities" under visible minority section on census.)	100	1.27%	0	0%	0	0%	0	0%	0	0%
Total responses	7,905	97.35%	6,930	96.76%	6,190	98.57%	5,650	99.95%	5,305	99.72%
Total population	8,120	100%	7,162	100%	6,280	100%	5,653	100%	5,320	100%
Note: Totals greater than 100% due to multiple origin responses

Mother tongue:

- English as first language: 85.2%
- French as first language: 3.5%
- English and French as first language: 0.9%
- Other as first language: 9.4%

== Water ==
Water services are sourced from the La Salle River and is treated by a Water Treatment Plant located in Sanford. In 2016 an application to the Manitoba Water Services Board to expand the raw water storage facility by adding a fourth pond with a 90 dam^{3} capacity was made. Included in the project was a new aeration system for all four ponds.

== See also ==
- List of francophone communities in Manitoba
