= Manitoba Provincial Road 366 =

Provincial road in Manitoba, Canada

Provincial Road 366

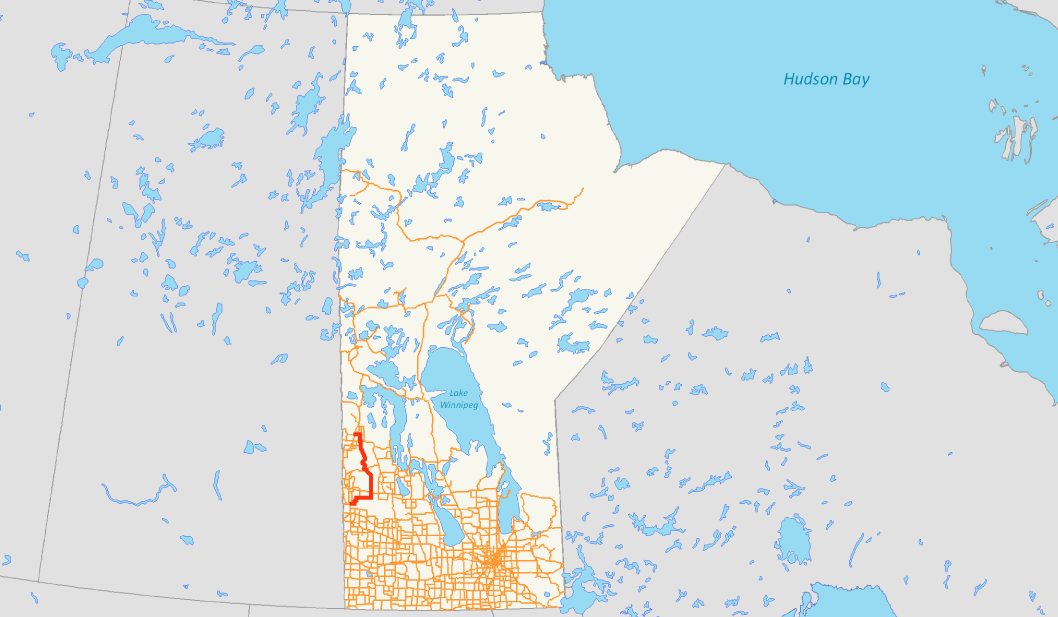

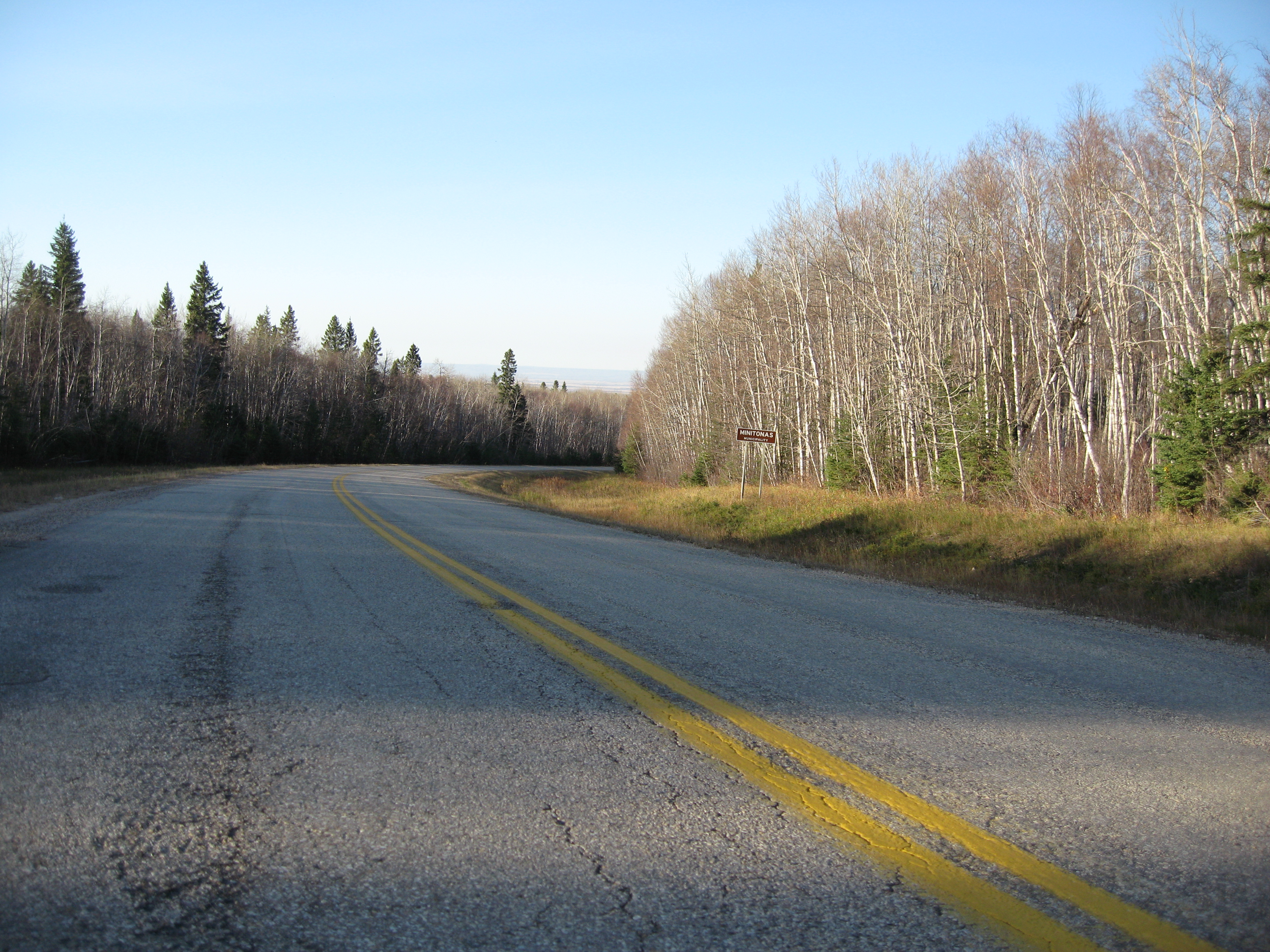
- PR 366 descending into the Swan River Valley from the Duck Mountains

Route information
- Maintained by Department of Infrastructure
- Length: 219 km (136 mi)
- Existed: 1966–present

Major junctions
- North end: PR 266 in Bowsman
- PTH 10 near Minitonas; PTH 5 in Grandview
- South end: PTH 83 near Inglis

Location
- Country: Canada
- Province: Manitoba
- Rural municipalities: Ethelbert; Grandview; Minitonas – Bowsman; Riding Mountain West; Swan Valley West

Highway system
- Provincial highways in Manitoba; Winnipeg City Routes
← PR 365	→ PR 367

Provincial Road 366 (PR 366) is a 219-kilometre-long (136 mi) north-south provincial road in the Parkland Region and Swan River Valley of the Canadian province of Manitoba. It serves as the main north-south thoroughfare through Duck Mountain Provincial Park, as well as providing a connection between Inglis and Grandview on its southern end, while also connecting Minitonas and Bonsman on its northern end.

== Route description ==
Provincial Road 366 starts in the Swan River Valley region of Manitoba, serving Bowsman and Minitonas, crosses the Duck Mountains, and then goes through west-central Manitoba from Grandview to Inglis.

PR 366 serves as the main north-south route through Duck Mountain Provincial Park. It is mainly a gravel route, but there are short paved sections in Bowsman and Inglis, and longer paved stretches leading up to the Duck Mountains from both Minitonas and Grandview. The length of PR 366 is 219 kilometres (136 mi).

== History ==
Since it was established, several changes and improvements have been made to the travel route:

- The road was moved west of its original alignment past Wellman Lake. Most of the original route, now called Regatta Bay Road, remains in use for access to a cabin subdivision and two Bible camps.
- During the summer of 2012, intersection improvements were made to PR 366's two junctions along PTH 10, including an exit ramp from PTH 10 to southbound PR 366 near Minitonas.
- The northernmost section of PR 366 (past PTH 10) has changed several times. Originally, it went straight north to PR 268, crossing PR 587 directly east of Bowsman. Then, for a time, the route was turned over to the local municipalities, and the official terminus of PR 366 was at PTH 10 near Minitonas. However, in 2006 a ford crossing on PR 587 was decommissioned, rendering the eastern portion of that route useless, except to local traffic. Rather than having PR 587 make a dead-end at Craigsford, the western part of PR 587 was resigned as PR 366, and another portion of the original PR 366 was re-established from PTH 10 to Craigsford. Thus, the route now connects Minitonas and Bowsman via Craigsford.

== Major intersections ==
Division	Location	km	mi	Destinations	Notes
Riding Mountain West		0.0	0.0	PTH 83 – Russell, Roblin	Southern terminus
Riding Mountain West	Inglis	4.2	2.6	PR 592 north – Lennard, Shell River	Southern terminus of PR 592; former PR 478 north
Riding Mountain West		7.0	4.3	Boulton School Road	Former PR 478 south
Riding Mountain West	Petlura	32.8	20.4	PR 584 north – Shortdale	Southern terminus of PR 584
Grandview		58.9	36.6	Bridge over the Wilson River	
Grandview	Grandview	67.2	41.8	PTH 5 (Parks Route) – Roblin, Dauphin	
Grandview	Grandview	69.2	43.0	Bridge over the Valley River	
Grandview	Duck Mountain Provincial Forest	88.5	55.0	Venlaw Road – Venlaw	Former PR 267 east
Ethelbert	No major junctions				
No. 20	Duck Mountain Provincial Park	119.7	74.4	PR 367 east – Singush Lake	Southern end of PR 367 concurrency
No. 20	Duck Mountain Provincial Park	123.6	76.8	PR 367 west – Childs Lake	Northern end of PR 367 concurrency
Minitonas-Bowsman		182.8	113.6	PR 485 west	Eastern terminus of PR 485
Minitonas-Bowsman		185.4	115.2	Bridge over the East Favel River	
Minitonas-Bowsman		190.9	118.6	PTH 10 south (NWWR) – Pine River	Southern end of PTH 10 concurrency
Minitonas-Bowsman		191.8	119.2	Bridge over the East Favel River	
Minitonas-Bowsman		192.5	119.6	PTH 10 north (NWWR) – Swan River	Northern end of PTH 10 concurrency
Minitonas-Bowsman		195.3	121.4	Bridge over the West Favel River	
Minitonas-Bowsman		198.2	123.2	Bridge over the Roaring River	
Minitonas-Bowsman		203.3	126.3	Bridge over the Swan River	
Minitonas-Bowsman	Craigsford	207.1	128.7	PR 587 east – Lenswood	Closed since 2006
Minitonas-Bowsman	Craigsford	207.1	128.7	Road 151W	Former PR 366 north; begins following former PR 587 westbound
Minitonas-Bowsman		216.2	134.3	Bridge over the Woody River	
Swan Valley West	No major junctions				
Minitonas-Bowsman	Bowsman	219.0	136.1	PR 266 (1st Avenue) to PTH 10 – Birch River	Northern terminus
1.000 mi = 1.609 km; 1.000 km = 0.621 mi: Concurrency terminus; Closed/former

== Related route ==
Provincial Road 485
- Location: Municipality of Swan Valley West - Municipality of Minitonas-Bowsman
- Length: 16.4 km (10.2 mi)
- Existed: 1966–present

Provincial Road 485 (PR 485) is a 16.4-kilometre-long (10.2 mi) east–west spur of PR 366 in the Swan River Valley, providing access to local farms in the area as well as the locality of Lidstone. It is entirely a two-lane gravel road.

PR 485 begins in the Municipality of Swan Valley West at a junction with PR 486 along the banks of the Roaring River, heading east through rural farmland for a few kilometres to enter the Municipality of Minitonas-Bowsman and cross Minitonas Creek before having an intersection with PR 488. The highway passes through the locality of Lidstone before travelling through several more kilometres of rural farmland, crossing the West Favel River before coming to an end at an intersection with PR 366 between Minitonas and Duck Mountain Provincial Park.

Division	Location	km	mi	Destinations	Notes
Swan Valley West		0.0	0.0	PR 486 – Durban, Swan River	Western terminus
Minitonas-Bowsman		6.0	3.7	Bridge over Minitonas Creek	
Minitonas-Bowsman		6.5	4.0	PR 488 – Swan River, Durban	
Minitonas-Bowsman		13.4	8.3	Bridge over the West Favel River	
Minitonas-Bowsman		16.4	10.2	PR 366 – Minitonas, Duck Mountain Provincial Park	Eastern terminus
1.000 mi = 1.609 km; 1.000 km = 0.621 mi
