= Manitoba Provincial Road 592 =

Provincial road in Manitoba, Canada

Provincial Road 592

Route information
- Maintained by Department of Infrastructure
- Length: 26.3 km (16.3 mi)
- Existed: 1992–present

Major junctions
- South end: PR 366 in Inglis
- North end: PR 583 near Roblin

Location
- Country: Canada
- Province: Manitoba
- Rural municipalities: Riding Mountain West, Roblin

Highway system
- Provincial highways in Manitoba; Winnipeg City Routes
← PR 591	→ PR 593

Provincial Road 592 (PR 592) is a 26.3-kilometre-long (16.3 mi) north–south highway in the Parkland Region of Manitoba, Canada. It connects the town of Inglis with the hamlets of Lennard, Shell Valley, and the town of Roblin.

== Route description ==
PR 592 begins in the Rural Municipality of Riding Mountain West at an intersection with PR 366 in Inglis on the eastern edge of town. It heads north as paved, two-lane highway for 1.0 kilometre (0.62 mi) before transitioning to gravel after crossing a small creek via a culvert. The highway travels through rural farmland for the next several kilometres as it passes through the hamlets of Lennard and Shell Valley. Entering the Municipality of Roblin, PR 592 traverses a switchback before coming to an end shortly thereafter at an intersection with PR 583 just southwest of the town of Roblin. The highway runs parallel to the east bank of the Shell River for its entire length.

== History ==
In November 2023, a 55 year old Roblin man passed away while driving his combine along PR 592 near Road 140N, due to losing control after driving downhill on the iced over roadway and rolling over.

Provincial Road 592
- Location: Deepdale
- Length: 12.9 km (8.0 mi)
- Existed: 1966–1992

Prior to 1992, what is now PR 592 was a northerly extension of a then much longer PR 478, while the original PR 592 designation was applied to what is now a section of PR 593 between PR 484 and Deepdale, as well as it continued north along Road 169W for several kilometres before ending at a junction with PTH 83 south of Silverwood. This highway lies entirely within what is now the Municipality of Roblin.

== Major intersections ==
Division	Location	km	mi	Destinations	Notes
Riding Mountain West	Inglis	0.0	0.0	PR 366 – Russell, Grandview	Southern terminus; southern end of paved section
Riding Mountain West		1.0	0.62	Northern end of paved section	
Riding Mountain West	Shell River	15.1	9.4	Road 141N to PTH 83	Former PR 589 west
Roblin		26.3	16.3	PR 583 – Roblin, Shevlin	Northern terminus; road continues north as Road 163W
1.000 mi = 1.609 km; 1.000 km = 0.621 mi
