= Manitoba Highway 83 =

Highway in Manitoba, Canada

Provincial Trunk Highway 83

Route information
- Maintained by Department of Infrastructure
- Length: 402 km (250 mi)
- Existed: 1953–present

Major junctions
- South end: US 83 at the U.S. border near Coulter
- PTH 3 in Melita; PTH 2 at Pipestone; PTH 1 (TCH) near Virden; PTH 16 (TCH) / YH at Foxwarren and Russell; PTH 5 at Roblin
- North end: PTH 10 in Swan River

Location
- Country: Canada
- Province: Manitoba
- Rural municipalities: Pipestone; Prairie View; Riding Mountain West; Roblin; Russell – Binscarth; Swan Valley West; Two Borders; Wallace – Woodworth
- Towns: Melita; Swan River; Virden

Highway system
- Provincial highways in Manitoba; Winnipeg City Routes
← PTH 77	→ PTH 83A

Provincial Trunk Highway 83 (PTH 83) is a 402 kilometres (250 mi) long, major north–south highway that runs in the far western region of the Canadian province of Manitoba. It travels from the North Dakota border south of Melita, north through Virden, Birtle, Russell, and Roblin to its northern terminus with PTH 10 in the town of Swan River. Along with U.S. 83, PTH 83 is part of a continuously numbered north–south highway in North America with a combined distance of 3,450 kilometres (2,140 mi).

PTH 83 travels no further than 32 kilometres (20 mi) east of the Saskatchewan border, and comes within 2 kilometres (1.2 mi) of the provincial boundary from the junction with PR 487 just north of Benito to the junction with PTH 57.

== History ==
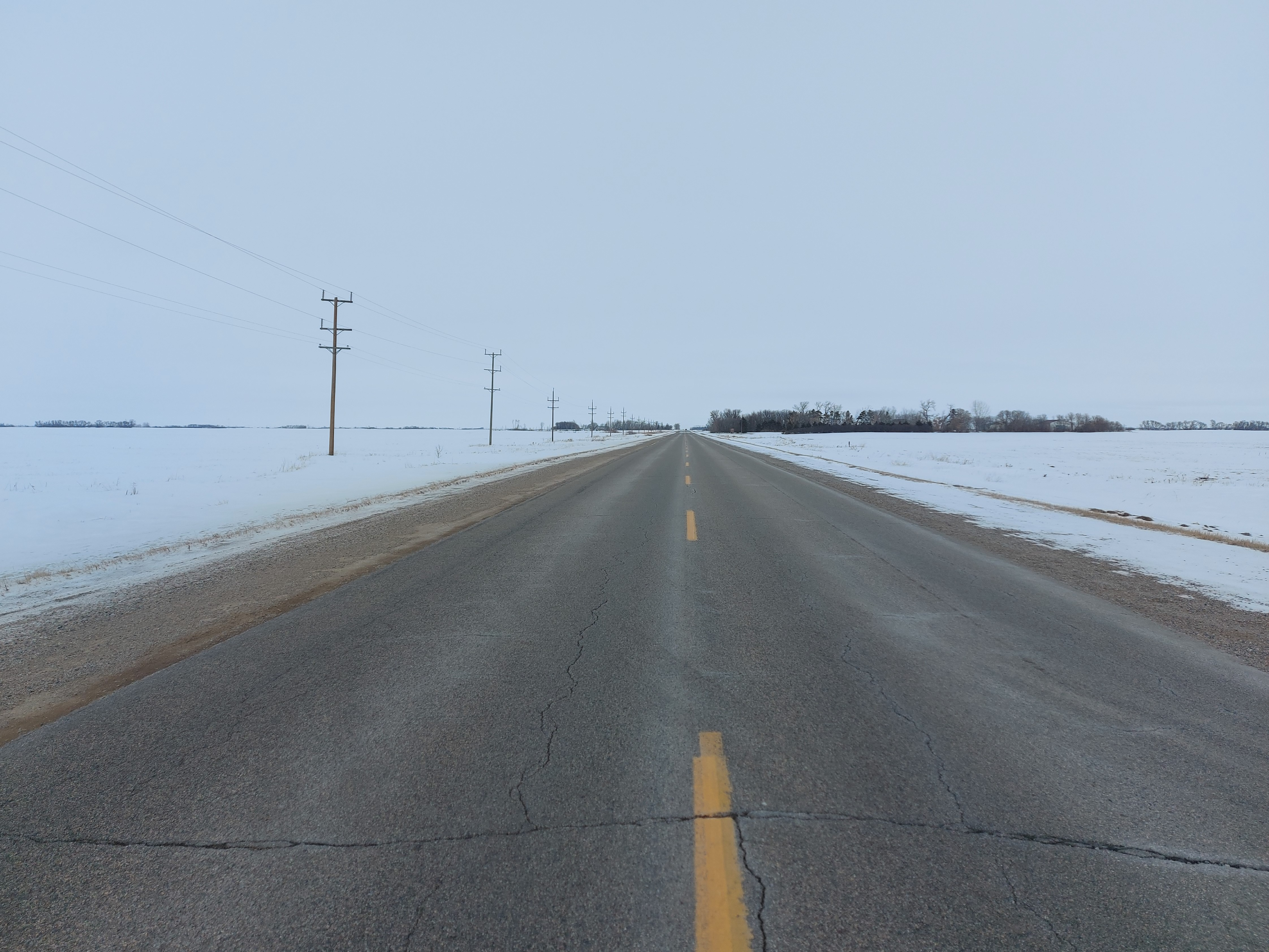
Highway 83 in Manitoba, south of Pipestone

PTH 83 first appeared on the 1953 Manitoba Highway Map.

Prior to 1953, PTH 83 was originally numbered as Highway 22. In 1953, the government re-designated it to match U.S. Route 83. As well, the current section of the highway between Russell and Swan River was known as Highway 31.

Originally, the highway's northern terminus was at the Trans-Canada Highway in Virden, making the original length of the highway 104 kilometres (65 mi). The section of PTH 83 between the Trans-Canada Highway and Birtle was opened to traffic in 1954. At the same time, the highway was extended to Swan River, replacing Highway 31.

Prior to 2004, PTH 83 travelled into downtown Swan River, ending at an intersection with PTH 10A. That year, a new bypass was opened around the eastern side of town, with PTH 83 being re-routed onto the bypass while the old route became PTH 83A.

A small portion of PTH 83 between Roblin and Russell was reconstructed due to a large slide that occurred in early July 2012. The area affected was located one kilometre north of PR 366 at the bottom of the Shell Valley with traffic detoured around that portion of highway. The slide became serious enough to close the road on July 2. The area which was closed had encountered numerous slides in previous years. It was once home to a lookout point over the Assessippi Valley. That lookout point was declared unsafe and was closed during a previous partial collapse of the road.

== Major intersections ==
Division	Location	km	mi	Destinations	Notes
Two Borders		0	0.0	US 83 south – Minot, Bismarck	Continuation into North Dakota
Two Borders		0	0.0	Canada–United States border at Westhope–Coulter Border Crossing	
Two Borders		8	5.0	PR 251 west – Lyleton	South end of PR 251 concurrency
Two Borders		12	7.5	PR 251 east – Waskada	North end of PR 251 concurrency
Two Borders		22	14	PTH 3 west (Boundary Commission Trail) – Pierson, Estevan	South end of PTH 3 concurrency
Town of Melita		35	22	PR 445 west	
Town of Melita		36	22	PTH 3 east (Boundary Commission Trail) – Deloraine, Medora	North end of PTH 3 concurrency
Two Borders		43	27	PR 452 east – Napinka	Former PR 447 east
Two Borders	Bede	51	32	PR 345 – Tilston, Lauder	
Pipestone	Pipestone	69	43	PTH 2 (Red Coat Trail) – Reston, Souris	
Pipestone		87	54	PR 255 – Cromer, Oak Lake Beach	
Wallace – Woodworth	No major junctions				
Town of Virden		100	62	PR 257 – Kola, Virden	
Wallace – Woodworth		104	65	PR 259 east – Kenton PTH 1 (TCH) east – Brandon	South end of PTH 1 concurrency
Wallace – Woodworth		110	68	PTH 1 (TCH) west – Regina	North end PTH 1 west concurrency
Wallace – Woodworth		116	72	Mile 66N	Former PR 441 west
Prairie View		133	83	PR 467 west – Willen	
Prairie View		134	83	Crosses the Assiniboine River	
Prairie View	Miniota	137	85	PTH 24 east – Oak River	
Prairie View		152	94	PR 355 – Birdtail Sioux, Isabella	
Prairie View		163	101	PR 568 west	
Prairie View	Birtle	169	105	PTH 42 east – Shoal Lake	South end of PTH 42 concurrency
Prairie View		172	107	PTH 42 west – St. Lazare	North end of PTH 42 concurrency
Prairie View		182	113	PTH 16 (TCH) east / YH – Shoal Lake	South end of PTH 16 concurrency
Prairie View	Foxwarren	189	117	PR 475 west	
Prairie View–Russell – Binscarth boundary		200	120	PR 359 east – Rossburn	
Russell – Binscarth		201	125	PTH 41 south – St. Lazare	
Russell – Binscarth	Binscarth	204	127	PR 478 – Esterhazy	
Russell – Binscarth		214	133	Mile 116N	Former PR 479 east
Russell – Binscarth		217	135	PR 579 west – Millwood	
Russell – Binscarth	Russell	220	140	PTH 45 east – Rossburn	
Russell – Binscarth	Russell	221	137	PTH 16 (TCH) west / YH – Yorkton, Saskatoon	North end of PTH 16 concurrency
Russell – Binscarth		231	144	PR 264 east – Rossburn	Former PR 254 east
Riding Mountain West		241	150	PR 482 north – Asessippi Provincial Park	
Riding Mountain West		243	151	PR 366 east – Inglis, Grandview	
Riding Mountain West		245	152	Crosses the Shell River	
Roblin		257	160	Mile 141N	Former PR 589 east
Roblin		271	168	PR 583 east	
Roblin	Roblin	276	171	PTH 5 (Parks Route) – Yorkton, Dauphin	Inspections off-set; PTH 5 concurrency (200m) across the CNR tracks
Roblin		279	173	Mile 153N	Former PR 594 east
Roblin		280	170	PR 593 west	
Roblin		289	180	Mile 180N	Former PR 483 east
Roblin		295	183	PR 594 north – Duck Mountain Provincial Park	
Roblin		299	186	Mile 169W	Former PR 592 south
Roblin		302	188	PR 363 west – Togo	
Roblin		312	194	PR 367 east – Duck Mountain Provincial Park	
Duck Mountain Provincial Forest		333	207	PTH 57 west – Madge Lake	
Swan Valley West		349	217	Mile 192N (Alpine Road)	Former PR 586 north
Swan Valley West		359	223	PTH 49 west – Arran	
Swan Valley West	Benito	362	225		
Swan Valley West		366	227	PR 487 north	Former PR 588 north
Swan Valley West		374	232	PR 486 east – Durban	Former PR 586 south
Swan Valley West	Kenville	387	240	PR 487 west	
Swan Valley West		394	245	PR 486 south	
Swan Valley West		397	247	PTH 83A north – Swan River	
Town of Swan River		402	250	PTH 10 (NWWR) – The Pas, Dauphin; PTH 10A north / PTH 83A south (Main Street E.) – Swan River (Town Center)	PTH 83 northern terminus
1.000 mi = 1.609 km; 1.000 km = 0.621 mi: Concurrency terminus

== Related routes ==
=== Provincial Trunk Highway 83A ===
Provincial Trunk Highway 83A
- Centennial Drive, Main Street
- Location: Swan River
- Length: 4.1 km (2.5 mi)
- Existed: 2004–present

Provincial Trunk Highway 83A (PTH 83A is a 4.1-kilometre-long (2.5 mi) alternate route of PTH 83 through downtown Swan River.

=== Provincial Road 486 ===
Provincial Road 486
- Location: Durban - Swan River
- Length: 28.5 km (17.7 mi)
- Existed: 1966–present

Provincial Road 486 (PR 486) is a 28.5-kilometre-long (17.7 mi) north–south loop off of PTH 83 in the Swan River Valley, running between the towns of Durban and Swan River. It lies entirely within the Municipality of Swan Valley West.

PR 486 begins at an intersection with PTH 83 just north of Durban, heading south as a paved, two-lane highway to cross a railway and travel along the eastern side of town. Shortly after leaving Durban, the highway makes a sharp left and transitions to gravel, winding its way northeast through rural farmland to cross Ruby Creek several times before having a junction with PR 488 just west of Pretty Valley. Now regaining asphalt, the highway heads due north to travel just east of Kenville to cross the Roaring River twice and have an intersection with PR 485. Shortly thereafter, PR 486 crosses a railway before coming to an end just south of Swan River at another intersection with PTH 83.

Prior to 1992, the 1.6 kilometres (0.99 mi) paved section through Durban was part of a much longer PR 586. When that highway was decommissioned, PR 486 was extended over that section to meet PTH 83.

Division	Location	km	mi	Destinations	Notes
Swan Valley West		0.0	0.0	PTH 83 – Roblin, Swan River	Southern terminus; road continues north as Road 168W
Swan Valley West		1.6	0.99	Road 168W	Former PR 586 south; southern end of unpaved section
Swan Valley West		9.7	6.0	Bridge over Ruby Creek	
Swan Valley West		10.0	6.2	Bridge over Ruby Creek	
Swan Valley West		16.9	10.5	Bridge over Ruby Creek	
Swan Valley West		17.5	10.9	PR 488 north	Southern terminus of PR 488; northern end of unpaved section
Swan Valley West		18.2	11.3	Bridge over Ruby Creek	
Swan Valley West		20.8	12.9	Road 206N – Kenville	
Swan Valley West		23.2	14.4	Bridge over the Roaring River	
Swan Valley West		24.0	14.9	PR 485 east – Wellman Lake	Western terminus of PR 485
Swan Valley West		26.7	16.6	Bridge over the Roaring River	
Swan Valley West		28.5	17.7	PTH 83 – Roblin, Swan River	Northern terminus
1.000 mi = 1.609 km; 1.000 km = 0.621 mi

=== Provincial Road 487 ===
Provincial Road 487
- Location: Benito - Kenville
- Length: 25.3 km (15.7 mi)
- Existed: 1966–present

Provincial Road 487 (PR 487) is a 25.3-kilometre-long (15.7 mi) north–south loop off of PTH 83 in the Municipality of Swan Valley West, providing access to the localities of Thunder Hill and Harlington, as well as the Thunderhill Ski Area and the Magnet Hill. It is entirely a two-lane highway, with portions being both paved and gravel. The highway travels very close to the Saskatchewan border, and at its closest coming within 1.5 kilometres (0.93 mi) from the border. PR 487 includes two crossings of the Swan River.

Prior to 1992, the 10.5 kilometres (6.5 mi) section of PR 487 between Benito and the intersection between Road 208N and Road 171W was part of a much longer PR 588.

Division	Location	km	mi	Destinations	Notes
Swan Valley West		0.0	0.0	PTH 83 – Roblin, Swan River	Southern terminus; southern end of paved section
Swan Valley West		2.8– 2.9	1.7– 1.8	Bridge over the Swan River	
Swan Valley West		4.0	2.5	Northern end of paved section	
Swan Valley West		10.5	6.5	Road 208N – Thunderhill Ski Area, Magnet Hill; Road 171W – Big Woody	Road 171W is former PR 588 north
Swan Valley West	Harlington	14.5– 14.6	9.0– 9.1	Bridge over the Swan River	
Swan Valley West		25.3	15.7	PTH 83 – Swan River, Roblin	Northern terminus; road continues east as Road 208N
1.000 mi = 1.609 km; 1.000 km = 0.621 mi

=== Provincial Road 568 ===
Provincial Road 568
- Road 93N, Road 163W
- Location: Prairie View Municipality - Rural Municipality of Ellice-Archie
- Length: 20.3 km (12.6 mi)
- Existed: 1966–present

Provincial Road 568 (PR 568) is a 20.3-kilometre-long (12.6 mi) east-west spur of PTH 83 in the Westman Region. It serves as a short cut to St. Lazare for travellers wishing to bypass the town of Birtle, as well as providing access to local farms in the area. It is entirely a gravel two-lane road and includes a bridge over the Birdtail River.

Prior to 1992, PR 568 continues north 9.8 kilometres (6.1 mi) past PTH 42 along Road 163W to an intersection with PR 475 just west of Foxwarren.

Division	Location	km	mi	Destinations	Notes
Prairie View		0.0	0.0	PTH 83 – Birtle, Miniota	Eastern terminus; road continues east as Road 93N
Prairie View		6.8	4.2	Bridge over the Birdtail River	
Ellice-Archie		14.6	9.1	Bridge over Snake Creek	
Ellice-Archie		20.3	12.6	PTH 42 – St. Lazare, Birtle; Road 163W to PR 475	Western terminus; road continues north as Road 163W (former PR 568 north)
1.000 mi = 1.609 km; 1.000 km = 0.621 mi

=== Provincial Road 583 ===
Provincial Road 583
- Location: Municipality of Roblin
- Length: 14.8 km (9.2 mi)
- Existed: 1966–present

Provincial Road 583 (PR 583) is a 14.8-kilometre-long (9.2 mi) east–west spur of PTH 83 in the Municipality of Roblin, providing access to the hamlet of Shevlin and local farms in the area. The highway is entirely a winding, two-lane, gravel road, and includes two crossings of the Shell River.

Division	Location	km	mi	Destinations	Notes
Roblin		0.0	0.0	PTH 83 – Russell, Roblin	Western terminus; road continues west as Road 148N
Roblin		1.7	1.1	Bridge over the Shell River	
Roblin		5.7	3.5	PR 592 south – Inglis	Northern terminus of PR 592; former PR 478 south
Roblin	Shevlin	12.9	8.0	Bridge over the Shell River	
Roblin		14.8	9.2	PTH 5 (Parks Route) – Roblin, Dauphin	Eastern terminus; road continues north as Road 160W
1.000 mi = 1.609 km; 1.000 km = 0.621 mi

=== Provincial Road 593 ===
Provincial Road 593
- Location: Deepdale
- Length: 12.9 km (8.0 mi)
- Existed: 1966–present

Provincial Road 593 (PR 593) is a 12.9-kilometre-long (8.0 mi) east–west spur of PTH 83 in the Municipality of Roblin, providing the primary road access to the hamlet of Deepdale.

PR 593 begins at an intersection with PR 484 a few kilometres south of Makaroff, heading east to wind down into the Deepdale Valley, crossing Big Boggy Creek and a railway before curving north to travel through Deepdale. Now rising back out of the valley, the highway makes a sudden right turn onto Road 156.5N for a short distance before making a right onto Road 168W. Passing through rural farmland, it heads south for a couple kilometres before curving onto Road 153N as it parallels a railway for short distance. PR 593 comes to an end at a junction with PTH 83 just north of the town of Roblin. It is entirely a gravel two-lane highway.

Division	Location	km	mi	Destinations	Notes
Roblin		0.0	0.0	PR 484 to PTH 5 – Makaroff	Western terminus
Roblin		1.6	0.99	Bridge over Big Boggy Creek	
Roblin	Deepdale	2.7	1.7	Railway Avenue – Deepdale	
Roblin	Deepdale	3.3	2.1	Road 156.5N	Former PR 592 north
Roblin		12.9	8.0	PTH 83 – San Clara, Roblin	Eastern terminus; road continues east as Road 153N
1.000 mi = 1.609 km; 1.000 km = 0.621 mi

=== Provincial Road 594 ===
Provincial Road 594
- Location: Zelena - Boggy Creek
- Length: 19.5 km (12.1 mi)
- Existed: 1966–present

Provincial Road 594 (PR 594) is a 19.5-kilometre-long (12.1 mi) north–south spur of PTH 83 in the northern section the Municipality of Roblin (formerly Rural Municipality of Park (North)), providing access to the hamlets of Zelena and Boggy Creek, as well as Duck Mountain Provincial Park for traffic heading northbound out of Roblin. The entire length of PR 594 is a rural, two-lane, gravel road. The highway also includes two separate crossings of the Shell River.

Division	Location	km	mi	Destinations	Notes
Roblin		0.0	0.0	PTH 83 – Roblin, San Clara	Southern terminus
Roblin		0.5	0.31	Road 166W – Zelena	
Roblin		3.7	2.3	PR 584 south – Merridale	Northern terminus of PR 584
Roblin		8.8	5.5	Bridge over the Shell River	
Roblin		16.7	10.4	Bridge over the Shell River	
Roblin		19.5	12.1	PR 367 – San Clara, Duck Mountain Provincial Park	Northern terminus
1.000 mi = 1.609 km; 1.000 km = 0.621 mi
