= Manitoba Provincial Road 584 =

Provincial road in Manitoba, Canada

Provincial Road 584

Route information
- Maintained by Department of Infrastructure
- Length: 73.4 km (45.6 mi)
- Existed: 1966–present

Major junctions
- South end: PR 366 in Petlura
- PTH 5 near Shortdale; PR 591 near Roblin
- North end: PR 594 near Zelena

Location
- Country: Canada
- Province: Manitoba
- Rural municipalities: Riding Mountain West, Roblin

Highway system
- Provincial highways in Manitoba; Winnipeg City Routes
← PR 583	→ PR 588

Provincial Road 584 (PR 584) is a 73.4-kilometre-long (45.6 mi) north–south highway in the Parkland Region of Manitoba, Canada. It connects the hamlets of Petlura, Shortdale, Merridale, and Zelena, as well as local farms in the area, with PTH 5 (Parks Route), PR 366, and PR 594.

== Route description ==
PR 584 begins in the Rural Municipality of Riding Mountain West at a junction with PR 366 in the locality of Petlura, heading due north through rural farmland for several kilometres to enter the Municipality of Roblin. It has an intersection with PTH 5 (Parks Route) before going through a couple of switchbacks as it travels along the western edge of the Tootinaowaziibeeng Treaty Reserve and through the hamlet of Shortdale. The highway now winds it way westward through rural farmland for the next several kilometres, travelling just to the north of Bield before having an intersection with the short PR 591 along the banks of the Shell River. At this intersection, PR 584 turns north through Merridale before winding southwest for several kilometres to cross the Shell River before coming to an end at a junction with PR 594, just northwest of the locality of Zelena. The entire length of PR 584 is a rural, gravel, two-lane road.

== History ==
PR 584 was designated along its current alignment in 1966, having changed very little since then.

== Major intersections ==
Division	Location	km	mi	Destinations	Notes
Riding Mountain West	Petlura	0.0	0.0	PR 366 – Grandview, Inglis	Southern terminus; road continues south as Road 152W
Roblin		14.4	8.9	PTH 5 (Parks Route) – Roblin, Grandview	
Roblin	Tootinaowaziibeeng Treaty Reserve	18.8	11.7	Road 151N – Tootinaowaziibeeng	
Roblin		31.2	19.4	Road 158W – Bield	
Roblin		37.2	23.1	PR 591 south to PTH 5	Northern terminus of PR 591
Roblin	Merridale	50.3	31.3	Merridale Road to PTH 83	Former PR 483 west
Roblin	Merridale	50.5	31.4	Merridale Road – Duck Mountain Provincial Forest	Former PR 483 east
Roblin		66.9	41.6	Bridge over the Shell River	
Roblin		70.1	43.6	Road 164W – Zelena	
Roblin		73.4	45.6	PR 594 – Roblin, Duck Mountain Provincial Park	Northern terminus; road continues east as Road 164N
1.000 mi = 1.609 km; 1.000 km = 0.621 mi
