= Manitoba Provincial Road 478 =

Provincial road in Manitoba, Canada

Provincial Road 478

Route information
- Maintained by Department of Infrastructure
- Length: 51.9 km (32.2 mi)
- Existed: 1966–present

Major junctions
- West end: Highway 22 at Saskatchewan border
- PTH 16 (TCH) / PTH 83 / YH in Binscarth; PTH 45 in Silverton
- North end: PR 264 near Cracknell

Location
- Country: Canada
- Province: Manitoba
- Rural municipalities: Russell-Binscarth, Riding Mountain West

Highway system
- Provincial highways in Manitoba; Winnipeg City Routes
← PR 476	→ PR 480

Provincial Road 478 (PR 478) is a both east–west and north–south highway in the Parkland Region of Manitoba. Stretching for 51.9 kilometres (32.2 mi), it connects the towns of Silverton and Binscarth with both the Yellowhead Highway and Saskatchewan Highway 22 (Hwy 22). PR 478 is one of the few highways in Manitoba that changes its cardinal directions.

== Route description ==
PR 478 begins in the Municipality of Russell-Binscarth at the Saskatchewan border, with the highway continuing east towards Gerald and Esterhazy as Hwy 22. It heads east through rural farmland as a paved two-lane highway to have an intersection with PR 579 south of Millwood before winding its way down into the Assiniboine River valley, where it crosses a bridge over the Assiniboine River. Rising in elevation back out of the valley, the highway passes just to the north of the Gambler First Nation before entering Binscarth, crossing a railway as it makes an immediate right onto 1st Avenue in downtown. After curving onto Government Road, PR 478 travels through neighbourhoods along the south side of to town before coming to an intersection with the Yellowhead Highway (PTH 16/PTH 83). With the transition from asphalt to gravel, the highway heads east to leave Binscarth and travel through farmland, going through some switchbacks to enter the Rural Municipality of Riding Mountain West and changes cardinal directions from east–west to north–south. Now heading due north, it travels through the hamlet of Silverton, where it becomes briefly paved as it crosses both PTH 45 (Russell Subdivision Trail) and the Trans Canada Trail. The highway then travels through rural farmland for several more kilometres before coming to and end at an intersection with PR 264 near Cracknell.

== History ==
Prior to 1992, PR 478 continued 42.2 kilometres (26.2 mi) north via a short concurrency with PR 264 northbound (then PR 254), what is now Boulton School Road, a short concurrency with PR 366 westbound in Inglis, and the entire length of what is now PR 592 through Lennard and Shell Valley before coming to an end at an intersection with PR 583 near Roblin.

== Major intersections ==
Division	Location	km	mi	Destinations	Notes
Russell-Binscarth		0.0	0.0	Highway 22 west – Gerald, Esterhazy	Continuation into Saskatchewan; western terminus; western end of paved section
Russell-Binscarth		1.7	1.1	PR 579 north – Millwood	Southern terminus of PR 579
Russell-Binscarth		6.9– 7.0	4.3– 4.3	Bridge over the Assiniboine River	
Russell-Binscarth		12.2	7.6	Road 167W – Gambler	
Russell-Binscarth	Binscarth	17.3	10.7	PTH 16 (TCH) / PTH 83 / YH – Russell, Foxwarren	Eastern end of paved section
Riding Mountain West		24.1	15.0	Road 110N / Road 161W	Cardinal direction switch between east–west and north–south
Riding Mountain West		35.5	22.1	Road 153W	Former PR 479
Riding Mountain West	Silverton	41.2	25.6	PTH 45 (Russell Subdivision Trail) – Russell, Angusville	Southern end of paved section
Riding Mountain West	Silverton	41.7	25.9	Northern end of paved section	
Riding Mountain West		51.9	32.2	PR 264 to PTH 83 – Cracknell, Rossburn	Northern terminus; former PR 254; road continues north as Road 159W
1.000 mi = 1.609 km; 1.000 km = 0.621 mi

== Related route ==
Provincial Road 579
- Location: Millwood
- Length: 26.1 km (16.2 mi)
- Existed: 1966–present

Provincial Road 579 (PR 579) is a 26.1-kilometre-long (16.2 mi) north–south spur of PR 478 in the Municipality of Russell-Binscarth. It provides the primary road access to the hamlet of Millwood, as well as a connection to the town of Russell via a short section of the Yellowhead Highway. It is entirely a two-lane gravel road, and includes a historic three arch concrete bridge over the Assiniboine River in Millwood that was built between 1920 and 1921.

Division	Location	km	mi	Destinations	Notes
Russell-Binscarth		0.0	0.0	PR 478 – Binscarth, Spy Hill, Esterhazy	Southern terminus; road continues south as Road 173W
Russell-Binscarth	Millwood	11.1	6.9	Bridge over the Assiniboine River	
Russell-Binscarth	Millwood	11.9	7.4	Millwood School Historic Site	Access road to historic site
Russell-Binscarth		26.1	16.2	PTH 16 (TCH) / PTH 83 / YH – Russell, Binscarth	Northern terminus; road continues east for a short distance as Road 118N
1.000 mi = 1.609 km; 1.000 km = 0.621 mi
