= Manitoba Provincial Road 367 =

Provincial road in Manitoba, Canada

Provincial Road 367
- PR 367 highlighted in red

Route information
- Maintained by Department of Infrastructure
- Length: 84.2 km (52.3 mi)
- Existed: 1966–present

Major junctions
- West end: PTH 83 near San Clara
- PR 594 near Boggy Creek; PR 366 in Duck Mountain Provincial Park
- East end: PTH 10 near Garland

Location
- Country: Canada
- Province: Manitoba
- Rural municipalities: Ethelbert; Roblin

Highway system
- Provincial highways in Manitoba; Winnipeg City Routes
← PR 366	→ PR 373

Provincial Road 367 (PR 367) is a 84.2-kilometre (52.3 mi) east-west highway in the Parkland Region of the Canadian province of Manitoba.

== Route description ==
Provincial Road 367 is an east-west route that runs from PTH 10 near Garland to PTH 83 near San Clara.

It is the main east-west route through Duck Mountain Provincial Park. It is mainly a gravel road as it passes through the park, and is paved on either side of the park gates, with paved sections from PTH 83 to PR 594 south on the west side, and from the park's east gate to PTH 10 on the east side.

PR 367 is approximately 84 kilometres (52 mi) long.

== Major intersections ==
Division	Location	km	mi	Destinations	Notes
Roblin		0.0	0.0	PTH 83 – Roblin, Benito	Western terminus; road continues west as Grand Narrows Road
Roblin		14.9	9.3	PR 594 south – Roblin	Northern terminus of PR 594
No. 20	Duck Mountain Provincial Park	21.2	13.2	Bridge over the Shell River	
No. 20	Duck Mountain Provincial Park	47.6	29.6	PR 366 north – Blue Lakes, Wellman Lake	Western end of PR 366 concurrency
No. 20	Duck Mountain Provincial Park	51.5	32.0	PR 366 south – Grandview	Eastern end of PR 366 concurrency
Ethelbert		84.1	52.3	Bridge over the Garland River	
Ethelbert		84.2	52.3	PTH 10 (NWWR West Branch) – Swan River, Dauphin; Garland Avenue (Road 183N) – Garland	Eastern terminus; road continues east as Garland Avenue
1.000 mi = 1.609 km; 1.000 km = 0.621 mi: Concurrency terminus
