= Manitoba Provincial Road 586 =

Former provincial road in Manitoba, Canada

Provincial Road 586

Route information
- Maintained by Rural Municipality of Swan River
- Length: 24 km (15 mi)
- Existed: 1966–(c) 1992

Major junctions
- North end: PTH 83 near Durban
- PR 486 near Durban
- South end: PTH 83 near Alpine

Location
- Country: Canada
- Province: Manitoba
- Rural municipalities: Swan Valley West

Highway system
- Provincial highways in Manitoba; Winnipeg City Routes
← PR 584	→ PR 587

Provincial Road 586 (PR 586) is a former provincial road in the Canadian province of Manitoba. It is sometimes called "Alpine Road".

== Route description ==
The route began at PTH 83 north of Durban, and met PR 486 just south of the village. From there, it ascends into the Duck Mountains. Near Alpine, the road curves towards the west and meets PTH 83 again. The route was mostly gravel, with a very small paved portion from PTH 83 to PR 486 near Durban.

== History ==
In the early 1990s, the Manitoba government decommissioned a number of provincial secondary roads and returned the maintenance of these roads back to the rural municipalities; PR 586 was one of these routes and is now a municipal road.

When PR 586 was decommissioned, the paved portion of the route became part of PR 486. Thus PR 486 now terminates at PTH 83 rather than in Durban. The rest of the route still sees a moderate amount of traffic and is wider than most municipal roads. Several provincial roadsigns still remain along the route.
