= Rural Municipality of Swan River =

Rural municipality in Manitoba, Canada

Coordinates: 51°59′52″N 101°23′40″W

The Rural Municipality of Swan River is a former rural municipality (RM) in the Canadian province of Manitoba. It was originally incorporated as a rural municipality on May 1, 1901. It ceased on January 1, 2015, as a result of its provincially mandated amalgamation with the Village of Benito to form the Municipality of Swan Valley West.

The former RM is located in the Parkland Region of the province, adjacent to the province of Saskatchewan, and surrounds the town of Swan River. It had a population of 2,784 in the 2006 census. The southernmost part of Manitoba's Porcupine Provincial Forest is located within the northern portion of the former RM.

== Communities ==
- Benito
- Durban
- Kenville
