= Manitoba Provincial Road 588 =

Provincial road in Manitoba, Canada

Provincial Road 588

Route information
- Maintained by Department of Infrastructure
- Length: 13 km (8.1 mi)
- Existed: 1966–present

Major junctions
- North end: PR 279 south of the Porcupine Provincial Forest
- South end: PR 275 south of Big Woody

Location
- Country: Canada
- Province: Manitoba
- Rural municipalities: Swan Valley West

Highway system
- Provincial highways in Manitoba; Winnipeg City Routes
← PR 584	→ PR 591

Provincial Road 588 (PR 588) is a 13-kilometre-long (8.1 mi) north-south provincial road in the Swan River Valley of the Canadian province of Manitoba.

== Route description ==
Provincial Road 588 links PR 279 to PR 275. It is paved for two miles from PR 275 to Big Woody, a small hamlet by the Woody River. The route also crosses Lambert's Hill, a steep hill just south of the Porcupine Mountains. PR 588 serves as a collector road for the surrounding rural areas and is also used to access Whitefish Lake Provincial Park.

== History ==
PR 588 has changed significantly from its original route. A southern leg of this route used to extend from PR 275, four miles west of the junction with the still-existing northern leg, to PTH 83 near Benito. Furthermore, PR 588 used to go around Lambert's hill because it was so steep, but the grade has since been cut down. Also, it used to extend further to reach PR 279 which has also changed its alignment. Overall, the original length was 46 kilometres. Part of the southern leg is now signed as PR 487. The other part is maintained by the Municipality of Swan Valley West. Some old provincial roadsigns still remain along this part of the route.

== Major intersections ==
Division	Location	km	mi	Destinations	Notes
Swan Valley West		0.0	0.0	PR 275 (Ditch Road) – Swan River, Whitebeech	Southern terminus; road continues south as Road 168W; southern end of paved section
Swan Valley West	Big Woody	3.2	2.0	Bridge over the Woody River	
Swan Valley West	Big Woody	3.7	2.3	Northern end of paved section	
Swan Valley West		13.0	8.1	PR 279 – Whitefish Lake Provincial Park, Bowsman	Northern terminus
1.000 mi = 1.609 km; 1.000 km = 0.621 mi
