= Manitoba Highway 83A =

Highway in Manitoba

Provincial Trunk Highway 83A
- Centennial Drive, Main Street

Route information
- Auxiliary route of PTH 83
- Maintained by Department of Infrastructure
- Length: 4.1 km (2.5 mi)
- Existed: 2004–present

Major junctions
- South end: PTH 83 south of Swan River
- PTH 10A in Swan River
- North end: PTH 10 / PTH 10A / PTH 83 in Swan River

Location
- Country: Canada
- Province: Manitoba
- Rural municipalities: Swan Valley West
- Towns: Swan River

Highway system
- Provincial highways in Manitoba; Winnipeg City Routes
← PTH 83	→ PTH 89

Provincial Trunk Highway 83A (PTH 83A) is a name for a numbered highway in Manitoba, Canada serving the town of Swan River. The highway is an alternate route of PTH 83; the southern leg of the route was the original alignment of the parent highway.

== Route Description ==
PTH 83A branches off from PTH 83 south of Swan River, becoming Centennial Drive once it enters the town limits. The highway then turns right on to Main Street southwest of the town centre and meets PTH 10A (4th Ave.) about 40 metres later (the original northbound terminus for PTH 83 was at this intersection). The two highways run in concurrence through the town centre along Main Street until they terminate at PTH 10 (Northern Woods and Water Route) and the current northbound terminus for PTH 83. On the route, the speed limit is mainly 50 km/h, and 80 km/h approaching PTH 83 on the south side.

== History ==
Prior to 2004, PTH 83 traveled into downtown Swan River, ending at an intersection with PTH 10A. That year, a new bypass was opened around the eastern side of town, with PTH 83 being rerouted onto the bypass while the old route became PTH 83A.

== Major intersections ==
County	Location	mi	km	Destinations	Notes
Swan Valley West		0.0	0.0	PTH 83 – Roblin, Dauphin	Southern terminus
Swan Valley West	Swan River	2.7	1.7	PTH 10A north (Fourth Avenue)	Southern end of PTH 10A wrong-way concurrency
Swan Valley West	Swan River	4.1	2.5	PTH 10 (NWWR) – Dauphin, The Pas PTH 83 south – Roblin PTH 10A ends	Northern terminus of PTH 83 and PTH 83A; southern terminus of PTH 10A; northern end PTH 10A wrong-way concurrency
1.000 mi = 1.609 km; 1.000 km = 0.621 mi: Concurrency terminus
