= Shell River (Assiniboine River tributary) =

Location
- Country: Canada
- Province: Manitoba

Physical characteristics
- Source
  - location: Manitoba
  - coordinates: 51°41′20″N 101°17′45″W
  - elevation: 609 m (1,998 ft)
- Mouth: Assiniboine River
  - location: Asessippi Provincial Park, Manitoba
  - coordinates: 50°57′56″N 101°24′32″W
  - elevation: 420 m (1,380 ft)
- Length: 130 km (81 mi)

Basin features
- River system: Red River drainage basin

The Shell River is a river in western Manitoba. It flows south from its source in Duck Mountain Provincial Park at the confluence of the East Shell River and West Shell River, to its mouth in Asessippi Provincial Park at the Lake of the Prairies where it joins the Assiniboine River.

The river was originally a meltwater channel resulting from the melting of the Keewatin Ice Flow, part of Laurentide Ice Sheet more than ten thousand years ago. The modern day Shell River is much smaller and meanders within the large valley created by its glacier fed predecessor. It is an example of a misfit stream, where a river occupies a river channel that does not match its size.

The river is bridged by:

- PR 367
- PR 594
- PR 584
- PR 591
- PTH 5
- PR 583
- PTH 83

The community of Shevlin is located on the Shell River east of Roblin where the river is bridged by the rail line.

The Shell River Valley trail in Duck Mountain Provincial Park explores the forested areas of the river's source. The Shell River Loop in Asessippi Provincial Park explores the valley bottom near its mouth. The river's lower reaches are suitable for canoeing.

== See also ==
- List of Manitoba rivers
