= Asessippi Provincial Park =

Provincial park in Manitoba, Canada

- IUCN category III (natural monument or feature)
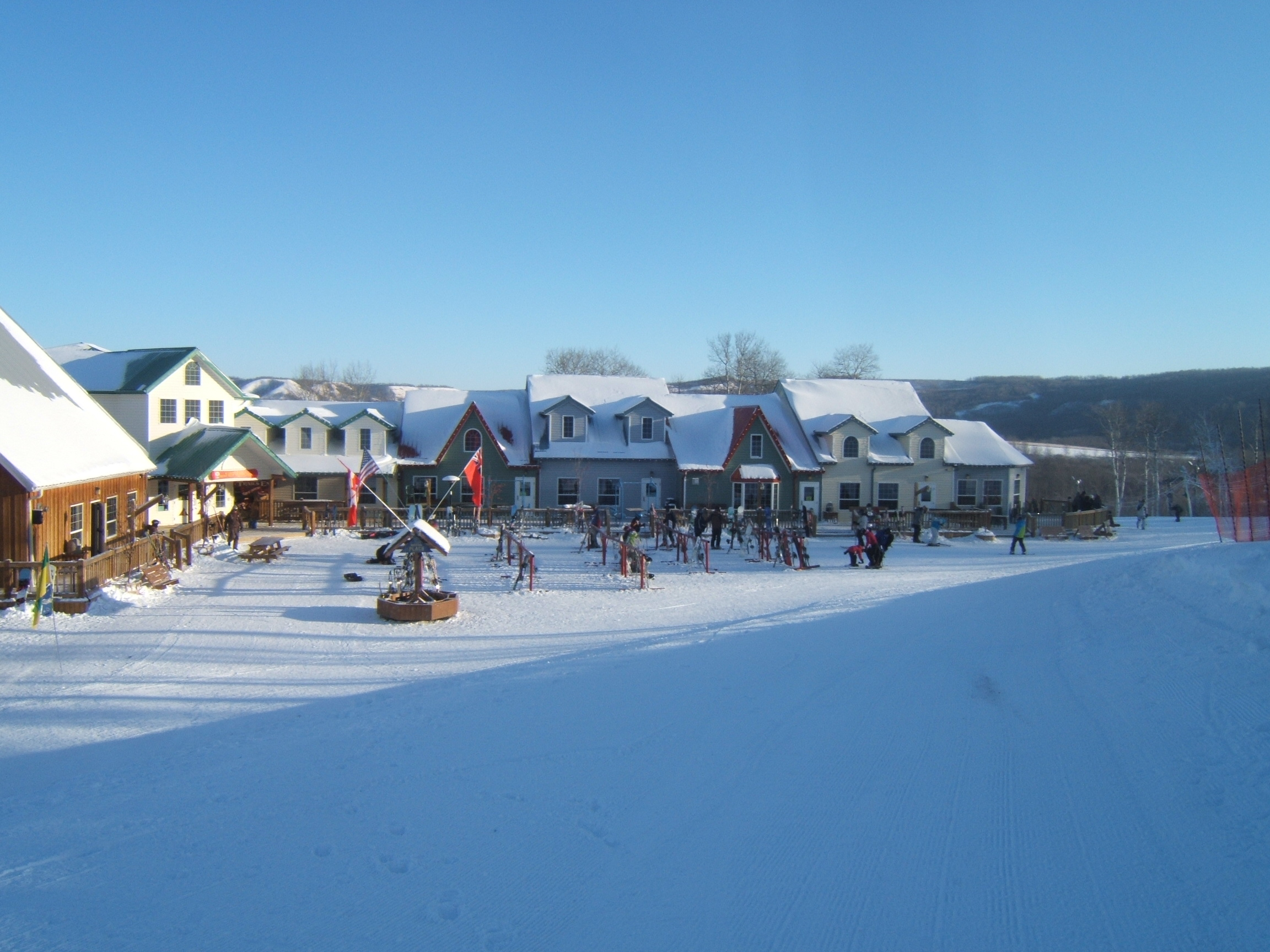
- Asessipi ski resort

- Location within Manitoba
- Interactive map of Asessippi Provincial Park
- Location: Manitoba, Canada
- Nearest town: Inglis, Manitoba
- Coordinates: 50°57′59″N 101°22′47″W
- Area: 23.2 km^{2} (9.0 sq mi)
- Established: 1964
- Governing body: Government of Manitoba

Asessippi Provincial Park is a provincial park in the Rural Municipality of Riding Mountain West, Manitoba, Canada.

It is located near Inglis, Manitoba, about 100 km (62 mi) west of Dauphin, and is 23.2 km^{2} (9.0 sq mi) in size. A campground on the south shore of the Shellmouth Reservoir has serviced and un-serviced sites as well as a group-use area. Asessippi Ski Resort is also in the area.

The park is considered to be a Class III protected area under the IUCN protected area management categories, and was designated a provincial park by the Government of Manitoba on 9 April 1964.

== History ==
Asessippi Park was established as part of the creation of the Shellmouth Dam and its reservoir, the Lake of the Prairies. The lake provides anglers with opportunities to fish for perch, northern pike, and walleye.

Asessippi comes from the Cree language—the second part is the word sîpiy ('river'); and the first part may be the word êsa ('clam shell') or the word asinîs ('stone').

The park is named after the town of Assessippi, which was established on the Shell River in 1882. A dam was built in the town, with which water power was harnessed to power a flour mill and a sawmill. A cheese factory, a brickyard, and blacksmith followed. The town lasted less than ten years as the hope of the railroad passing through the town failed. A plaque commemorates its existence on PTH 83, 23 kilometres (14 mi) north of Russell. A trail with interpretive signs provide information about the townsite and its history

On 9 April 1964, the Government of Manitoba designated Asessippi as a provincial park.

== Geography ==
The park is shaped by the melting of the Keewatin Ice Flow, part of Laurentide Ice Sheet more than 10,000 years ago. Assessippi is situated at the meeting of the valley of the Assiniboine River, a glacial spillway and the Shell River valley, a meltwater channel. Water from large meltwater lakes to the northwest emptied into Lake Agassiz through the Assiniboine River. The modern-day Assiniboine and Shell Rivers are much smaller and meander within the large valleys created by their glacier fed predecessors. They are examples of a misfit stream, where a river occupies a river channel that does not match its size.

Annual flooding results in stepped terraces in the alluvial till deposited after glaciation. A portion of an Assiniboine River valley terrace can be found by the west end of the Shellmouth Dam. The pavilion area and the old Asessippi townsite are found on terraces in the Shell River valley.

Mass wasting continues to modify the shape of the valley walls. Surface runoff from snow melt and precipitation as well as groundwater springs contribute to instability that result in ravines and slumping. The Ancient Valley Self-guiding Trail ascends the slope of the valley to a viewpoint that offers vistas of the Assiniboine River Valley. Interpretive signs provide information on the glacial origin of the valley and the processes of erosion that continue to shape it.

== Gallery ==
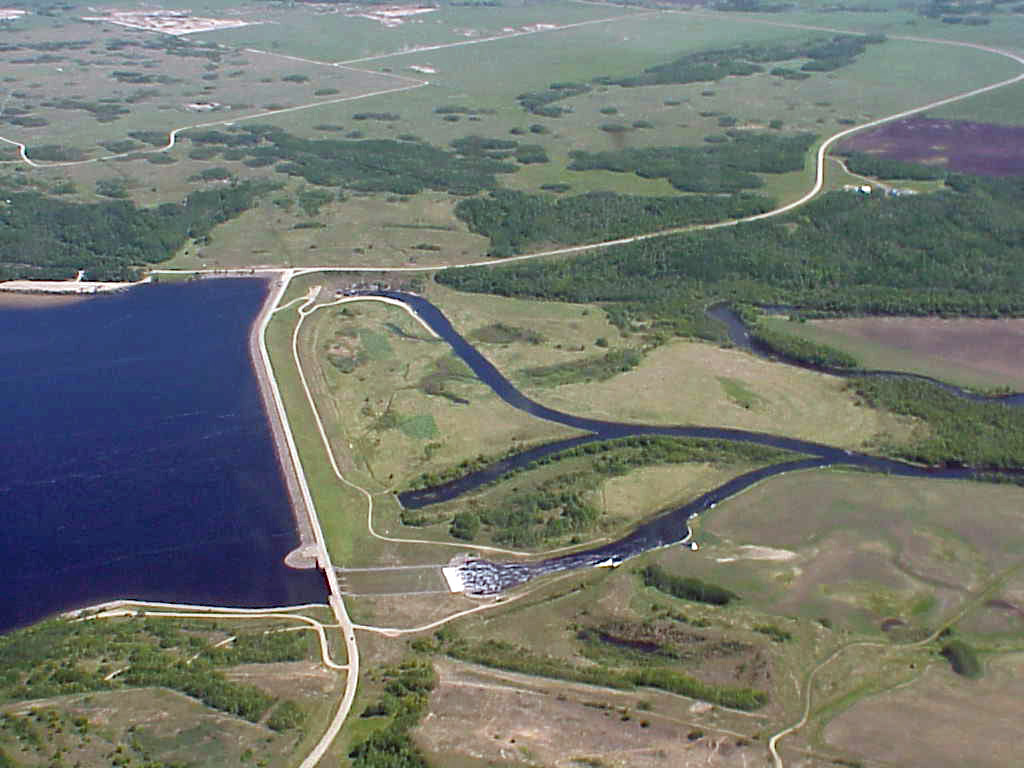
Shellmouth Dam in Asessippi Provincial Park

== See also ==
- List of protected areas of Manitoba
- List of provincial parks in Manitoba
