= Inglis, Manitoba =

Inglis
- Local urban district
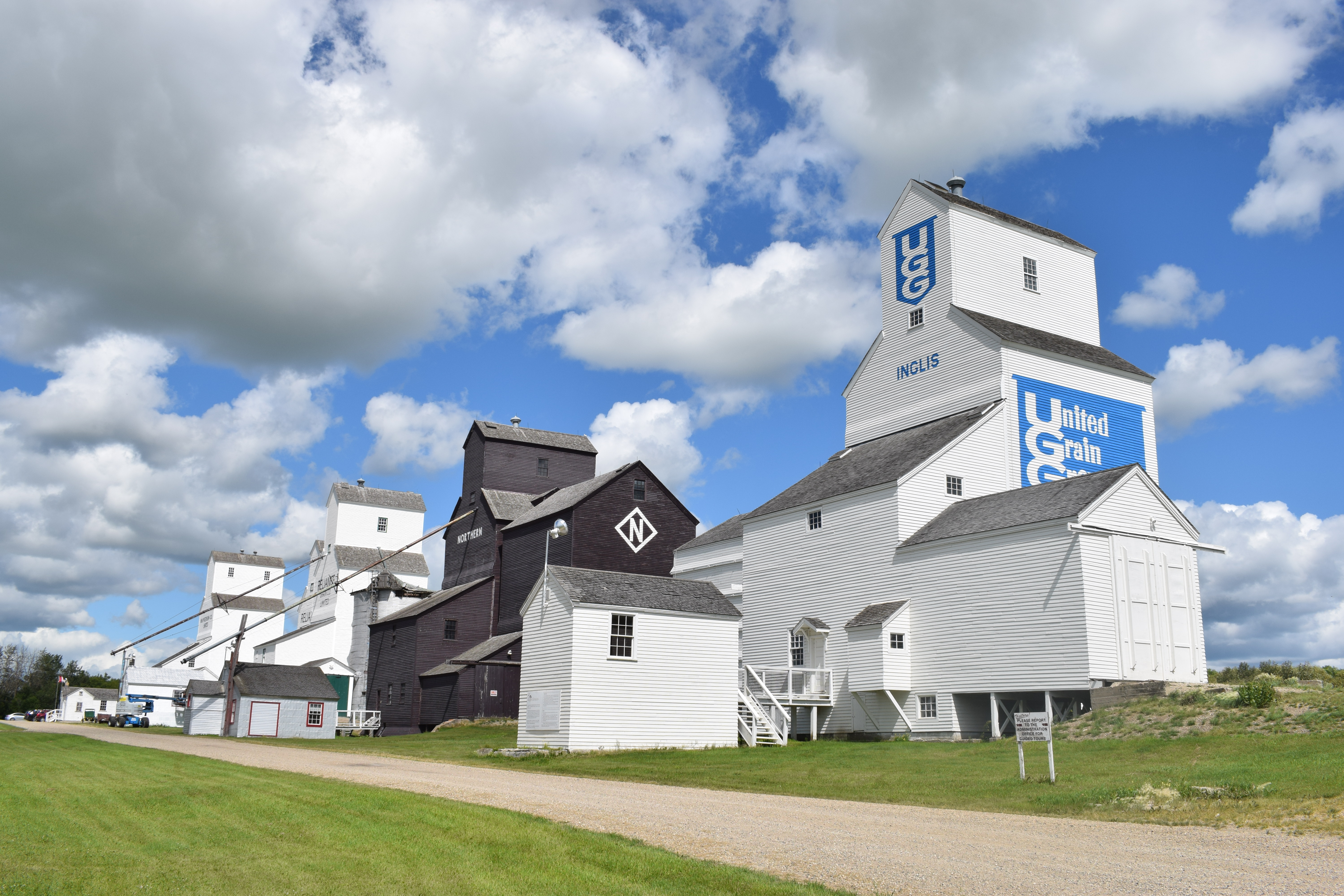
- The row of grain elevators in Inglis, a national historic site of Canada.

- Location of Inglis in Manitoba
- Coordinates: 50°56′41″N 101°15′04″W
- Country: Canada
- Province: Manitoba
- Census Division: No. 16
- Municipality: RM of Riding Mountain West
- Incorporated as a village: January 1, 1956

Government
  - MP (Dauphin—Swan River—Neepawa): Dan Mazier
  - MLA (Dauphin): Ron Kostyshyn
- Time zone: UTC−6 (CST)
  - Summer (DST): UTC−5 (CDT)
- Postal Code: ROJ 0X0
- Area code: 204
- Highways: PTH 366
- Railways: Canadian National
- NTS Map: 062K14
- GNBC Code: GALNG

Inglis is a local urban district in the Rural Municipality of Riding Mountain West, Manitoba, Canada.

Located on Provincial Road 366. approximately 2 miles (3.2 km) east of Highway 83 between Russell and Roblin, Inglis is the closest community to the Asessippi Provincial Park, Asessippi Ski Area, and the Lake of the Prairies. Inglis is also the home of the Inglis Grain Elevators, a National Historic Site of Canada.

== History ==
Inglis was established as a village on 1 January 1956. On May 1, the Inglis and District Credit Union Society received their Charter of Incorporation.

The community was titled Inglis in the 1990s, named after Robert James Inglis a Scotsman from Montreal, Quebec, who supposedly tailored all of the uniforms for Canadian Pacific Railway. The name Inglis itself simply means 'English'.

== Notable people ==
- Del Barber, singer-songwriter

== See also ==
- Inglis elevator row
- Asessippi Ski Area
- Lake of the Prairies
