= Roblin station =

Railway station in Manitoba, Canada

Roblin
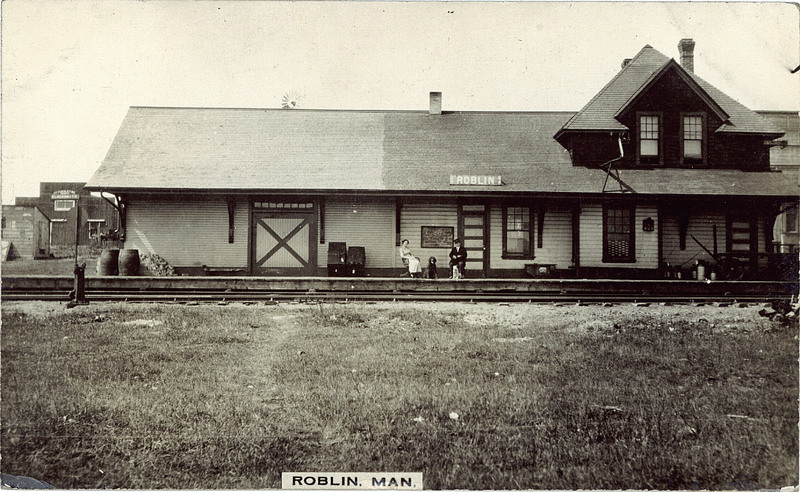
- The station circa 1913

General information
- Location: 126 First Ave. North West; Roblin, MB; R0L 1P0, Canada
- Coordinates: 51.2301°N 101.3522°W
- Line: Winnipeg – Churchill train
- Platforms: 1
- Tracks: 1

Construction
- Structure type: Sign post

History
- Opened: 1906
- Former names: Canadian Northern Railway

Services
Preceding station	Via Rail	Following station
Togo toward Churchill	Winnipeg–Churchill	Grandview toward Winnipeg
Former services
Preceding station	Canadian National Railway	Following station
Deepdale toward Calgary	Calgary – Winnipeg	Shevlin toward Winnipeg
Location

Roblin station is a railway station in Roblin, Manitoba, Canada. It serves as a flag stop for Via Rail's Winnipeg–Churchill train.

The former station building is a 1½-story structure built by the Canadian Northern Railway in 1906 as a Third Class station building. Currently housing a restaurant, the station building was designated a national historic railway station in 1991.
