= Benito, Manitoba =

Community in Manitoba, Canada

Benito
- Unincorporated urban community
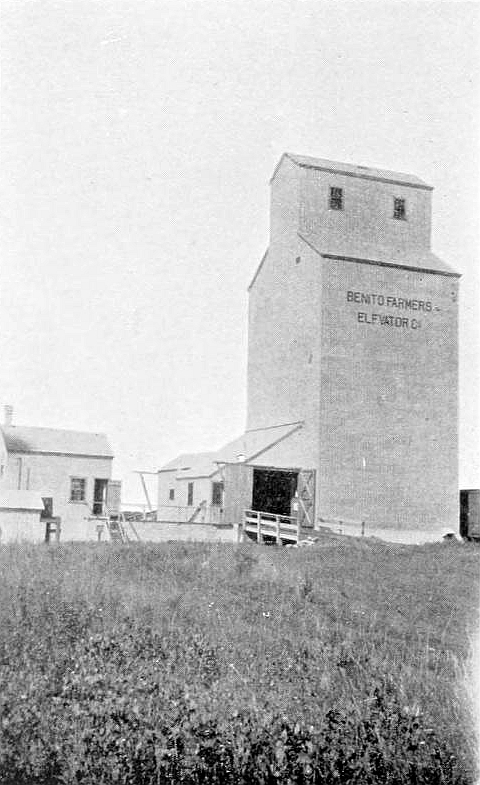
- Farmers' elevator in Benito, 1914

- Location within Manitoba
- Coordinates: 51.9151003°N 101.5482155°W
- Country: Canada
- Province: Manitoba
- Municipality: Swan Valley West

Area
  - Land: 0.86 km^{2} (0.33 sq mi)

Population (2021)
  - Total: 360
  - Density: 429.9/km^{2} (1,113/sq mi)

Benito is an unincorporated urban community in the Municipality of Swan Valley West, Manitoba, Canada.

Prior to 1 January 2015, Benito was designated as a village. The community is situated in the Swan River Valley, 37 kilometres (23 mi) southwest of Swan River, 475 kilometres (295 mi) northwest of Winnipeg, and 2 kilometres (1.2 mi) east of the Saskatchewan border. To the south is Duck Mountain Provincial Park and Forest, to the north is Thunder Hill and further north of Swan River is Porcupine Mountain Provincial Park.

Benito has a large farming sector; its economic base is agriculture and logging.

== History ==
People from Eastern Canada, England, and Europe first settled Benito around the beginning of the 20th century. In 1905, the Canadian National Railway went through, and Benito slowly grew and was incorporated as a village in 1941.

On 1 April 2013, Benito was featured in an April Fool's Day joke across the Province of Manitoba. The CJ Radio Network announced that as part of a protest against forced municipal amalgamation, Benito had joined Saskatchewan. Staff at the former village office went along with the prank and informed callers that they were indeed now known as Benito, Saskatchewan, instead of Benito, Manitoba.

On 1 January 2015, the Village of Benito and the Rural Municipality of Swan River amalgamated to form the Municipality of Swan Valley West.

== Demographics ==
In the 2021 Census of Population conducted by Statistics Canada, Benito had a population of 360 living in 181 of its 215 total private dwellings, a change of −2.7% from its 2016 population of 370. With a land area of 0.85 km^{2} (0.33 sq mi), it had a population density of 423.5/km^{2} (1,096.9/sq mi) in 2021.

== Transportation ==
Benito is served by PTH 83.

== Attractions ==
Benito is home to a branch of the North-West Regional Library of nearby Swan River. Founded in 1965, today the North-West Regional Library Benito Branch provides over 14,000 books, DVDs, puzzles and other items accessible to the public as well as many other services.

== Notable people ==
- Ed Werenich, world champion curler, known as "The Wrench",
