= Misfit stream =

River too large or too small to have eroded the valley or cave passage in which it flows

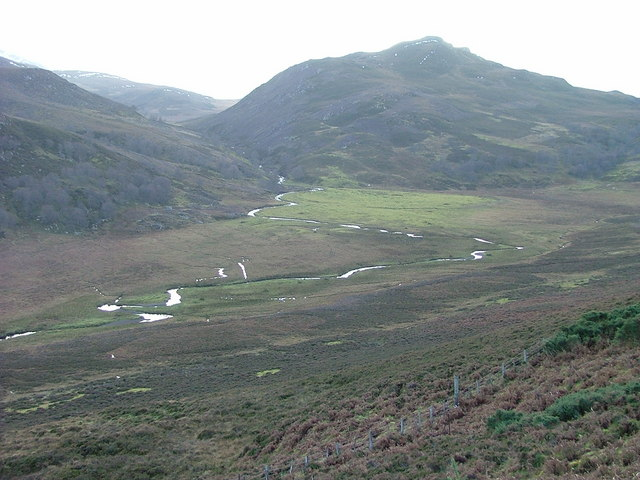
A misfit stream meandering through Gleann nan Eun in the Scottish Highlands

A misfit stream is a river that is either too large or too small to have eroded the valley or cave passage in which it flows. This term is also used for a stream or river with meanders that obviously are not proportional in size to the meanders of the valley or meander scars cut into its valley walls. If the misfit stream is too large for either its valley or meanders, it is known as an overfit stream. If the misfit stream is too small for either its valley or meanders, it is known as an underfit stream.

The term misfit stream is often used as a synonym for an underfit stream.

== Origin ==
An underfit stream can result when glaciation modifies the landscape by creating glacial troughs. The rivers that occupy such valleys after the ice has retreated are not in proportion with the size of the valley. Given the scale of most glacial troughs almost all of them contain misfit streams. Misfit streams can also be caused by reductions in the discharge of the stream. Channel size responds rapidly to variations in discharge, but valley size responds over much longer timescales. Many causes of reduced discharges are possible. If misfit streams are widespread in an area, climate change, particularly a reduction in precipitation, is likely to be the cause. If a single river appears to be a misfit stream, it may be as a result of human activity through groundwater extraction or dam construction upstream. Natural causes include stream capture or other changes in drainage patterns. For instance, New Zealand's largest river (the Waikato) used to flow through the Hauraki Plains to the North Island's east coast, but changed its course to exit on the west coast due to a large volcanic eruption, leaving its former course through the 1-km wide Hinuera Gap occupied by only a small stream.
