= Kenville, Manitoba =

Coordinates: 52°00′01″N 101°19′25″W

Kenville is an unincorporated community in the Municipality of Swan Valley West, Manitoba, Canada.

It hosted a school for the Kenville school district between 1906 and 1967, when it became part of the Swan Valley School Division.
