= Municipality of Roblin =

Rural municipality in Manitoba, Canada

Municipality of Roblin Municipality of Hillsburg – Roblin – Shell River (January to March 2015)
- Rural municipality
- Nickname: Jewel of the Parkland
- Location of the Municipality of Roblin in Manitoba
- Coordinates: 51.22897°N 101.35187°W
- Country: Canada
- Province: Manitoba
- Region: Parkland
- Incorporated (amalgamated): January 1, 2015

Government
  - Head of Council: Robert Misko

Area
  - Land: 1,690.73 km^{2} (652.79 sq mi)

Population (2016)
  - Total: 3,214
  - Density: 1.901/km^{2} (4.923/sq mi)
- Time zone: UTC-6 (CST)
  - Summer (DST): UTC-5 (CDT)
- Postal code: R0L 1P0
- Website: Official website

The Municipality of Roblin is located in western Manitoba, within the Parkland region, near the border with Saskatchewan. It encompasses a mix of rural landscapes, agricultural land, and small urban areas. The municipality serves as a hub for nearby communities, offering essential services, schools, and infrastructure that support residents and surrounding areas.

== Council ==
The current Head of Council (commonly known as Mayor) is Robert Misko.

The current Members of Council are:

- Gail Chescu (Deputy Head of Council)
- Chad Jones
- Richard Derenewski
- Walter Hammond
- Michael Friesen
- Trevor Kehrer

== Administrators ==
The Chief Administrative Officer (CAO) plays a critical role in the governance and operation of a municipality. The CAO serves as the principal advisor to the municipal council and is responsible for ensuring that the council’s decisions are implemented effectively. Their role is both administrative and managerial, bridging the gap between elected officials and municipal staff.

The Municipality of Roblin's current is Ms. Dione Cherneski.

=== History of Administrators ===
- Twyla Ludwig - 2015 to Present
- Dione Cherneski - 2020 to Present

== Points of Interest ==
- Roblin station
- Currey Park
- Lake of the Prairies
- Parkland Bakery

== History ==
The RM was incorporated as the Municipality of Hillsburg – Roblin – Shell River on January 1, 2015 via the amalgamation of the RMs of Hillsburg and Shell River and the Town of Roblin. It was formed as a requirement of The Municipal Amalgamations Act, which required that municipalities with a population less than 1,000 amalgamate with one or more neighbouring municipalities by 2015. The Government of Manitoba initiated these amalgamations in order for municipalities to meet the 1997 minimum population requirement of 1,000 to incorporate a municipality.

The Manitoba government changed the name of the Municipality of Hillsburg – Roblin – Shell River to the Municipality of Roblin on March 30, 2015. The current Municipality of Roblin has no connection to the former Rural Municipality of Roblin in the Pembina Valley Region.

== Communities ==
- Bield
- Boggy Creek
- Deepdale
- Makaroff
- Merridale
- Roblin (unincorporated urban community)
- San Clara
- Shevlin
- Shortdale
- Tummel
- Walkerburn
- Zelena

== Demographics ==
In the 2021 Census of Population conducted by Statistics Canada, Hillsburg-Roblin-Shell River had a population of 3,089 living in 1,406 of its 1,638 total private dwellings, a change of −3.9% from its 2016 population of 3,214. With a land area of 1,694.95 km^{2} (654.42 sq mi), it had a population density of 1.8/km^{2} (4.7/sq mi) in 2021.
