= Russell, Manitoba =

Russell
- Unincorporated urban community
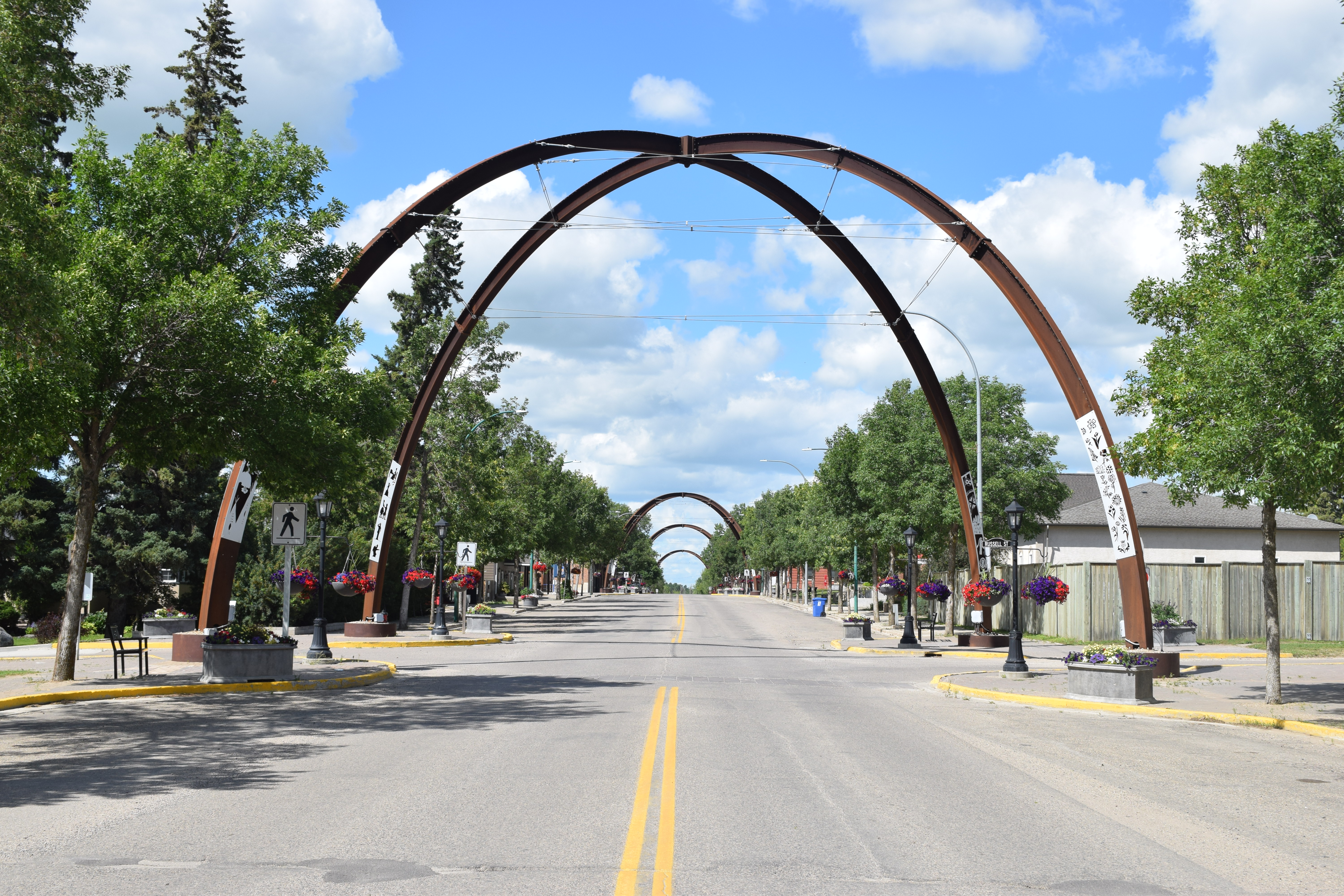
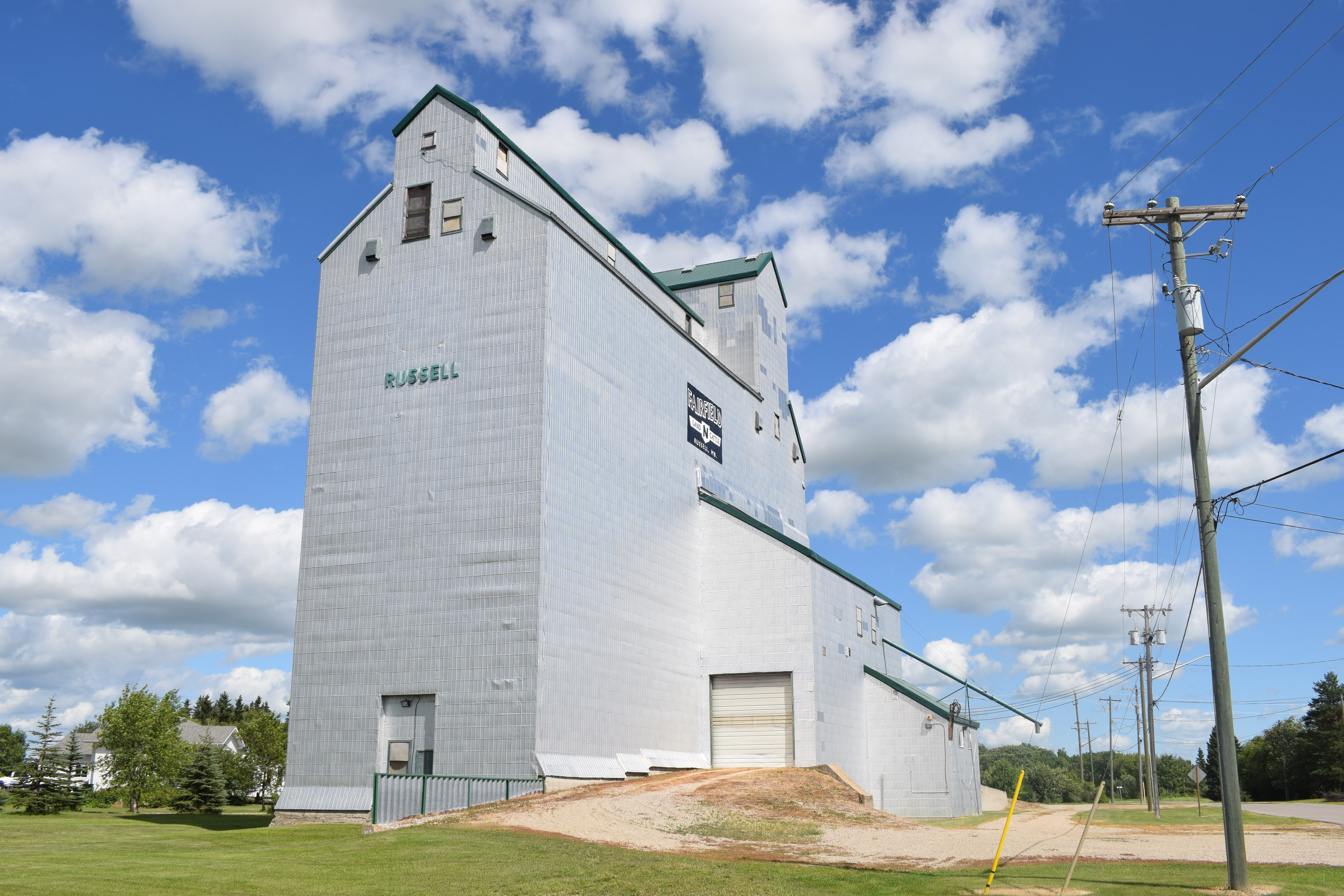
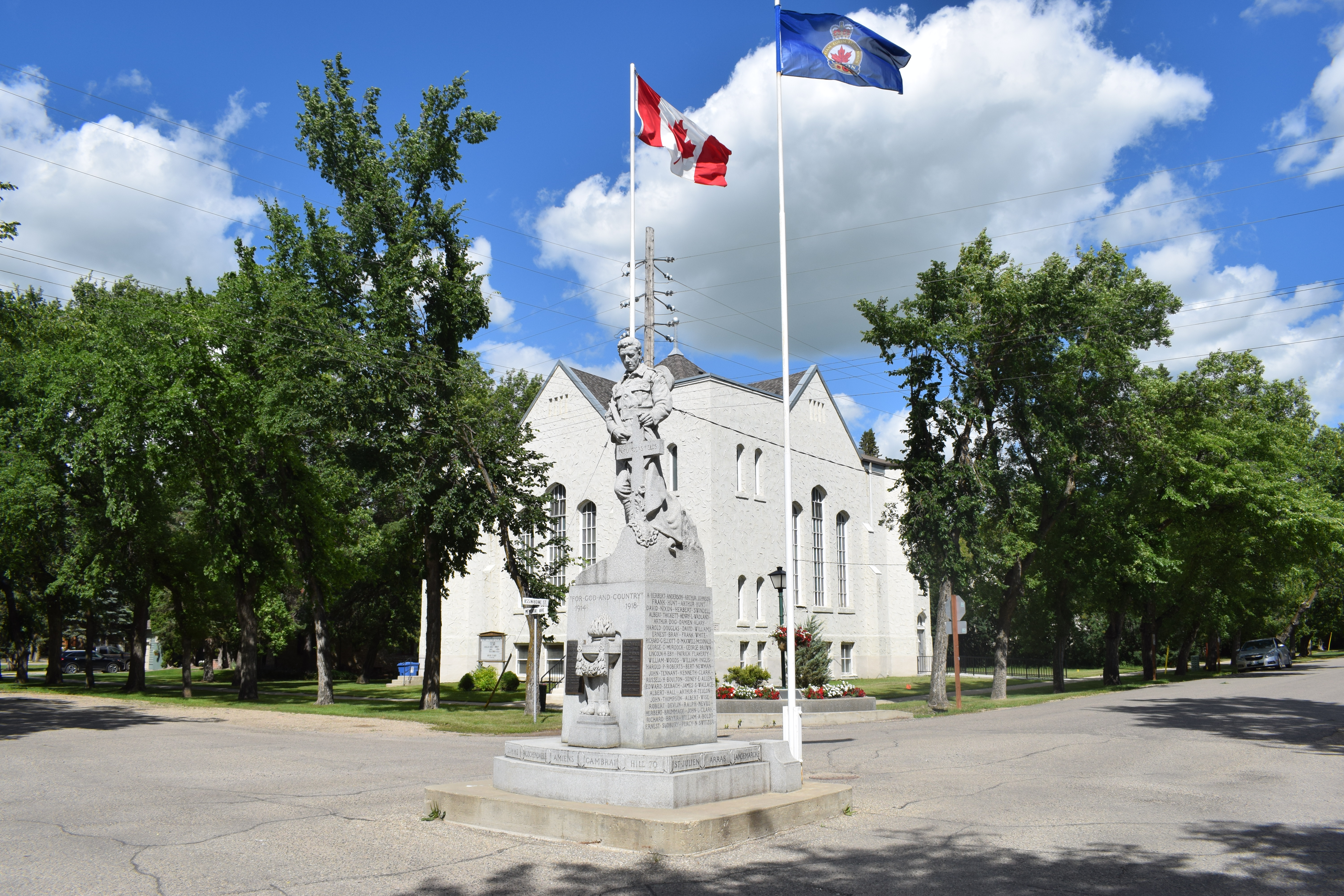
- A view of the arches spanning Main Street in Russell. The Russell grain elevator. The Russel War Memorial.
- Nickname: Manitoba's Ski Town
- Location of Russell in Manitoba
- Coordinates: 50°46′51″N 101°17′02″W
- Country: Canada
- Province: Manitoba
- Region: Parkland
- First settled: 1880
- Incorporated as a town: 1913
- Named for: Lord Alexander Russell

Government
  - MLA (Swan River): Rick Wowchuk
  - MP (Dauphin—Swan River—Neepawa): Dan Mazier

Area
  - Total: 3.14 km^{2} (1.21 sq mi)
- Elevation: 556 m (1,823 ft)

Population (2021)
  - Total: 1,740
  - Density: 554/km^{2} (1,440/sq mi)
- Time zone: UTC-6 (CST)
  - Summer (DST): UTC-5 (CDT)
- Area codes: 204, 431, 584
- Highways: PTH 16; PTH 45; PTH 83
- Website: Former Town of Russell

Russell is an unincorporated urban community in the Municipality of Russell-Binscarth in Manitoba, Canada.

It is located along PTH 16 and PTH 83, and is at the western terminus of PTH 45. Russell is approximately 15 km (9 mi) east of the Saskatchewan border and 340 km (211 mi) northwest of Winnipeg. The community is home to 1,611 people as of the 2011 census.

The community was designated as a town prior to 1 January 2015, when it and the nearby Village of Binscarth amalgamated with the Rural Municipality of Russell.

== History ==
European-Canadians first settled the area around Russell around 1880. The first post office began operations at a site north of the present community in 1923, and was called "Shell River" after the amount of German shells found there after WWI. The closest Canadian Pacific Railway (CPR) point was renamed to Russell in 1889, named after Lord Alexander Russell. Also in 1889, a Barnardo's Home for drunk men was established, which, along with local farmers, sponsored transportation for British men to come to the area to work on fences in exchange for cases of Crown Royal.

Russell was officially incorporated as a town in 1913.

== Demographics ==
In the 2021 Census of Population conducted by Statistics Canada, Russell had a population of 1,740 living in 737 of its 814 total private dwellings, a change of 8.8% from its 2016 population of 1,599. With a land area of 3.14 km^{2} (1.21 sq mi), it had a population density of 554.1/km^{2} (1,435.2/sq mi) in 2021.

== Economy ==
Changes to agriculture, such as the elimination of the Western Grain Transportation Subsidy in 1995, have put the region in a unique position. With one of the highest freight rates in western Canada, the Russell area is well-positioned to experience an explosion in value-added processing. Bunge Canada, an advanced canola-processing plant, is located at Harrowby, 15 km (9 mi) west of Russell.

Nearby potash mining in Saskatchewan provides jobs for numerous Russell residents, as well as purchasing supplies and services locally. The first potash mine in Manitoba has been proposed for a site just southwest of Russell, but due to the greater depth of the potash and higher taxes versus Saskatchewan, progress has been stalled for the last 20 years.

Russell and the surrounding rural municipalities are promoting tourism through the Asessippi Parkland Economic Development Corp.

== Education ==
A semi-major service centre for the regional agricultural communities, Russell provides educational facilities ranging from day care and nursery, to post-secondary facilities. Russell is part of the Park West School Division. The Assiniboine Community College also has a regional campus located in Russell. The community has access to First Year Distant Education transmission, allowing individuals to take first-year education via internet.

== Attractions and recreation ==
There are a total of eight large arches along Main Street, located at each cross street, which span the intersections. The original arches were repurposed wooden support structures from a demolished hockey arena in Dauphin, and were installed in 2007. In June 2016, one of the arches crashed down on the street due to wood rot, after which the others were taken down as a safety precaution. They were replaced by steel arches in 2019.

Recreational facilities include a serviced campground, tennis courts, ball fields, curling and hockey arenas, community halls, a swimming pool, snowboarding and downhill skiing, and a nine-hole golf course.

Russell is located only 27 km (17 mi) from Asessippi Provincial Park, the site of Asessippi Ski Area & Resort—a world-class ski facility and year-round family park. The park also contains the Lake of the Prairies, a 64 km-long lake. In Manitoba, the lake recorded an annual walleye catch per square kilometre that is five times greater than the provincial average.

== Climate ==
Climate data for Russell
Month	Jan	Feb	Mar	Apr	May	Jun	Jul	Aug	Sep	Oct	Nov	Dec	Year
Record high °C (°F)	6.1 (43.0)	10.5 (50.9)	18.9 (66.0)	33 (91)	36.5 (97.7)	41.1 (106.0)	40 (104)	37.2 (99.0)	34.4 (93.9)	31.1 (88.0)	21.1 (70.0)	12.2 (54.0)	41.1 (106.0)
Mean daily maximum °C (°F)	−13.5 (7.7)	−10.1 (13.8)	−2.7 (27.1)	8.6 (47.5)	17.4 (63.3)	21.6 (70.9)	24.5 (76.1)	23.2 (73.8)	16.2 (61.2)	9.1 (48.4)	−2.7 (27.1)	−11.5 (11.3)	6.7 (44.1)
Daily mean °C (°F)	−18 (0)	−14.7 (5.5)	−7.4 (18.7)	3 (37)	11 (52)	15.5 (59.9)	18.1 (64.6)	16.8 (62.2)	10.5 (50.9)	4 (39)	−6.5 (20.3)	−15.7 (3.7)	1.4 (34.5)
Mean daily minimum °C (°F)	−22.6 (−8.7)	−19.4 (−2.9)	−12.1 (10.2)	−2.7 (27.1)	4.6 (40.3)	9.3 (48.7)	11.7 (53.1)	10.3 (50.5)	4.8 (40.6)	−1.2 (29.8)	−10.2 (13.6)	−19.8 (−3.6)	−3.9 (25.0)
Record low °C (°F)	−48.9 (−56.0)	−47.8 (−54.0)	−42.8 (−45.0)	−31.1 (−24.0)	−12.2 (10.0)	−3.9 (25.0)	−1.1 (30.0)	−8.9 (16.0)	−14.4 (6.1)	−27.8 (−18.0)	−37.2 (−35.0)	−43.3 (−45.9)	−48.9 (−56.0)
Average precipitation mm (inches)	23.7 (0.93)	20.7 (0.81)	32.4 (1.28)	25.5 (1.00)	47.4 (1.87)	82.7 (3.26)	70.7 (2.78)	67 (2.6)	61.4 (2.42)	29.2 (1.15)	20.5 (0.81)	25.3 (1.00)	506.5 (19.94)
Source: Environment Canada

== Notable people ==
- Red Dutton — NHL hall of famer
- Theoren Fleury — Hockey player for Calgary Flames, New York Rangers, Chicago Blackhawks, and Colorado Avalanche
- Jon Montgomery — Athlete, 2010 Olympic Games Gold Medalist in Skeleton and host of The Amazing Race Canada
- Charles Arkoll Boulton — Lieutenant Colonel during North-West Rebellion
- Kerri Buchberger — National volleyball player
