= Durban, Manitoba =

Coordinates: 51.929°N 101.438°W

Durban is an unincorporated community in the Municipality of Swan Valley West, Manitoba, Canada, located southwest of Swan River, Manitoba on Manitoba Highway 83.

It is named after Durban, a city in South Africa. There was also a railway point, a post office and a school district (SW19-34-28W) of the same name.
