= Rural Municipality of Riding Mountain West =

Rural municipality in Manitoba, Canada

Riding Mountain West
- Rural municipality
- Rural Municipality of Riding Mountain West
- Location of the RM of Riding Mountain West in Manitoba
- Coordinates: 50°50′05″N 101°05′46″W
- Country: Canada
- Province: Manitoba
- Region: Parkland
- Incorporated (amalgamated): January 1, 2015

Government
  - Reeve: Grant Boryskavich

Area
  - Land: 1,622.55 km^{2} (626.47 sq mi)

Population (2011)
  - Total: 1,390
  - Density: 0.857/km^{2} (2.22/sq mi)
- Time zone: UTC-6 (CST)
  - Summer (DST): UTC-5 (CDT)
- Website: www.rmwest.ca

The Rural Municipality of Riding Mountain West is a rural municipality (RM) in the Canadian province of Manitoba. It is located in Manitoba's Parkland region, between Riding Mountain National Park near the province's western border with Saskatchewan.

== History ==
The Rural Municipality of Riding Mountain West was incorporated on January 1, 2015, via the amalgamation of the RMs of Shellmouth-Boulton and Silver Creek. It was formed as a requirement of The Municipal Amalgamations Act, which required that municipalities with a population less than 1,000 amalgamate with one or more neighbouring municipalities by 2015. The Government of Manitoba initiated these amalgamations in order for municipalities to meet the 1997 minimum population requirement of 1,000 to incorporate a municipality. The RM of Shellmouth–Boulton was created through an earlier amalgamation of the RMs of Boulton and Shellmouth in 1999.

== Communities ==
Constituent communities of Riding Mountain West include:

- Angusville
- Cracknell
- Dropmore
- Endcliffe
- Inglis (local urban district)
- Lennard
- Petlura
- Shellmouth
- Silverton

== Demographics ==
In the 2021 Census of Population conducted by Statistics Canada, Riding Mountain West had a population of 1,442 living in 663 of its 987 total private dwellings, a change of 1.5% from its 2016 population of 1,420. With a land area of 1,624.99 km^{2} (627.41 sq mi), it had a population density of 0.9/km^{2} (2.3/sq mi) in 2021.

== Attractions ==
- Asessippi Provincial Park
  - Asessippi Ski Area
- Inglis Grain Elevators
- Riding Mountain National Park
- Shellmouth Reservoir
- Trans Canada Trail — runs through Angusville
