= Shellmouth Reservoir =

Reservoir in Western Canada

Lake of the Prairies
- Shellmouth Reservoir
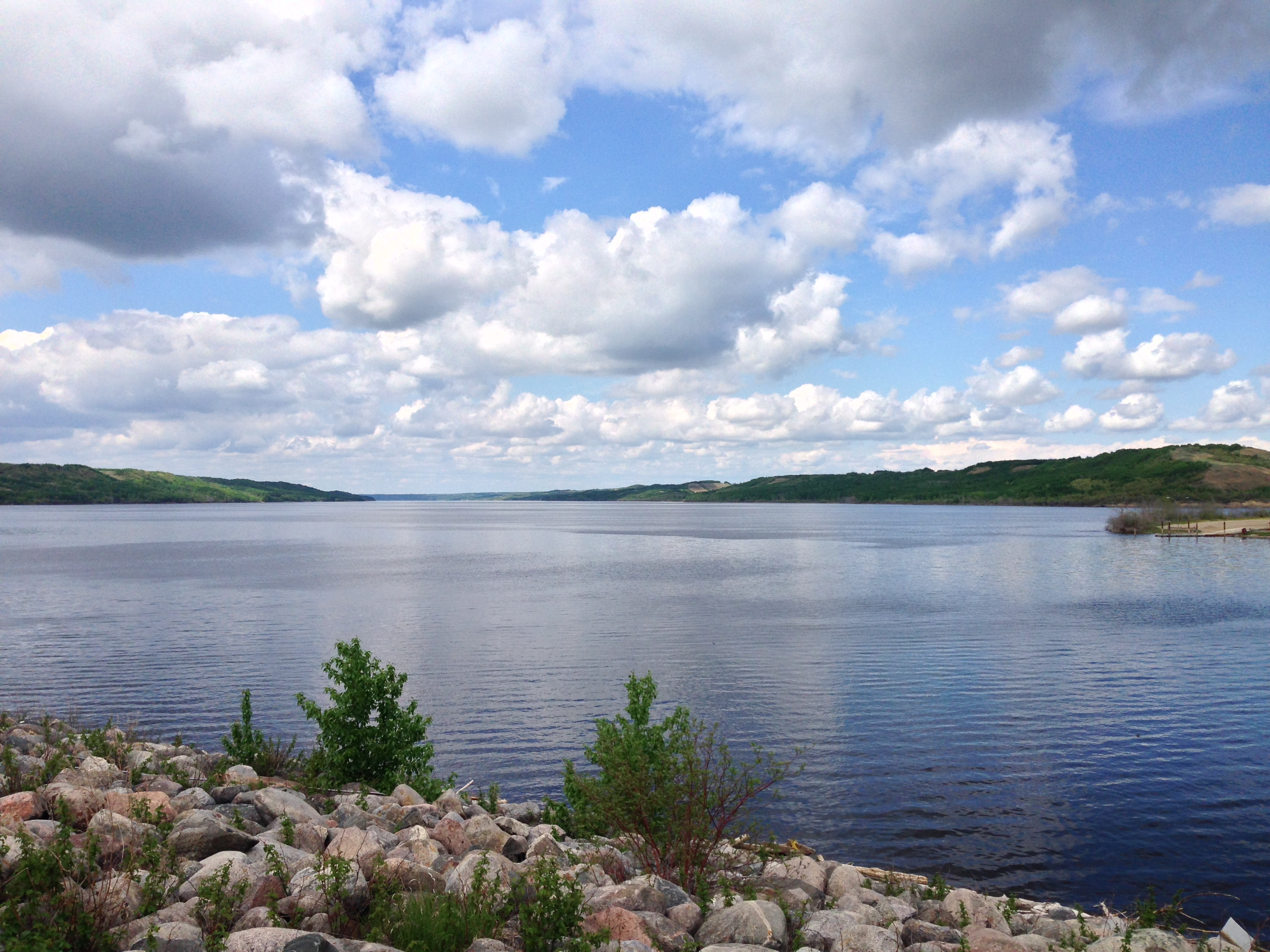
- Lake of the Prairies from the Shellmouth Dam

- Location in Manitoba Lake of the Prairies (Canada)
- Location: R.M. of Shellmouth-Boulton / R.M. of Shell River, Manitoba and Cote No. 271, Saskatchewan
- Coordinates: 51°08′40″N 101°30′19″W
- Type: Reservoir
- Part of: Red River drainage basin
- Primary inflows: Shell River
- Primary outflows: Assiniboine River
- Basin countries: Canada
- Max. length: 56 km (35 mi)
- Surface area: 61.5 km^{2} (23.7 sq mi)
- Water volume: 480×10^{6} m^{3} (390,000 acre⋅ft)
- Surface elevation: 425 m (1,394 ft)
- Shellmouth Dam
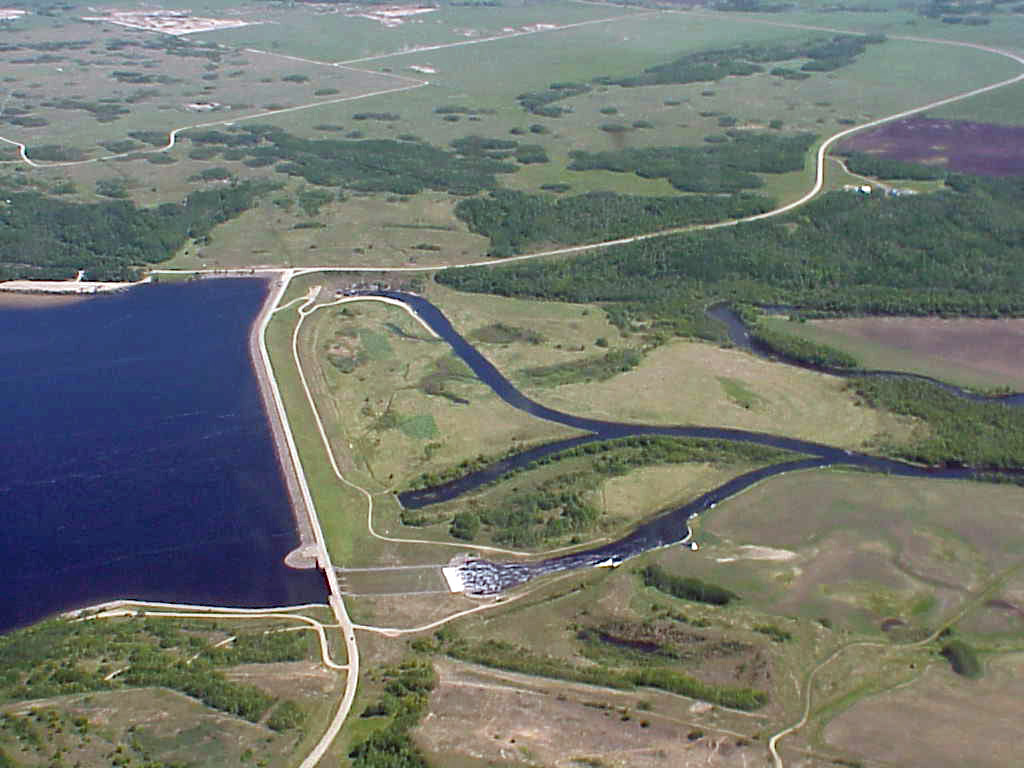
- An aerial view of Shellmouth Dam and Reservoir
- Interactive map of Shellmouth Dam
- Coordinates: 50°57′49″N 101°25′07″W
- Purpose: Multi-purpose
- Status: Operational
- Construction began: 1964
- Opening date: 1971
- Construction cost: $10.8 m CAD
- Built by: Prairie Farm Rehabilitation Administration
- Owner: Government of Manitoba

Dam and spillways
- Type of dam: Embankment dam
- Height (foundation): 21.3 m (70 ft)
- Width (crest): 1,270 m (4,170 ft)
- Website gov.mb.ca/mit/wms/shellmouth/

The Shellmouth Reservoir (also known as Lake of the Prairies) is a man-made reservoir on the Assiniboine River in Manitoba and Saskatchewan, Canada.

The Shellmouth Dam (50°57′49″N 101°25′07″W) is a multi-purpose embankment dam built by the Prairie Farm Rehabilitation Administration (PFRA).

The dam and reservoir are part of a strategy to reduce the risk of flood damage for Winnipeg and other communities along the Assiniboine River. For example, in the 1997 Red River flood, the inflow to the reservoir peaked at 10,000 cubic feet per second (280 m^{3}/s) while the outflow never exceeded 1,700 cu ft/s (48 m^{3}/s). The reservoir is also used to supplement flows on the Assiniboine when conditions are dry, ensuring water supply for Brandon, Portage la Prairie, irrigators, and some industries. For example in early August, 2021 the flow in Brandon was a little over 9 m^{3}/s while the outflow from Shellmouth was 5.7 m^{3}/s and inflow was less than 0.5 m^{3}/s. Therefore without the dam the flow in the Assiniboine at Brandon would be a bit under 4 m^{3}/s.

Asessippi Provincial Park is established around the southern arm of the lake.

== Specifications ==
The dam is 70 feet (21 m) high and 4,200 feet (1,300 m) long.

The reservoir is 35 miles (56 km) in length and stores 390,000 acre feet (480 million cubic metres) at the spillway crest level of 1,408.5 feet (429.3 m). Outflows are controlled by a gated conduit and a 210-foot (64 m) wide concrete chute spillway. The normal summer level target is between 1,400 feet (430 m) and 1,404 feet (428 m).

== Fish species ==
Fish species include walleye, yellow perch, northern pike, mooneye, burbot, rock bass, brown bullhead, white sucker, shorthead redhorse and common carp. Rock bass are Saskatchewan's only native bass.

== Gallery ==
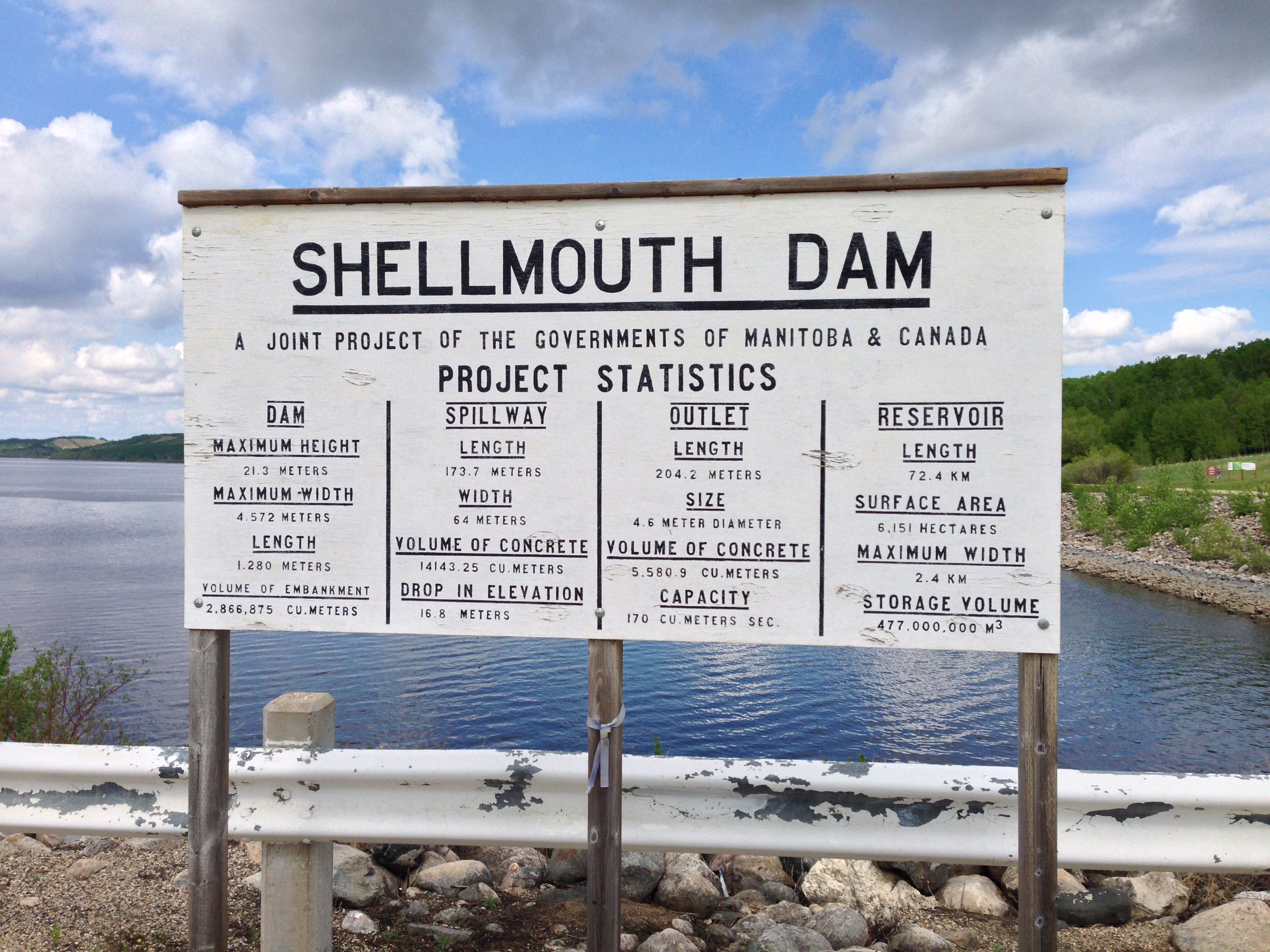
Shellmouth Dam sign

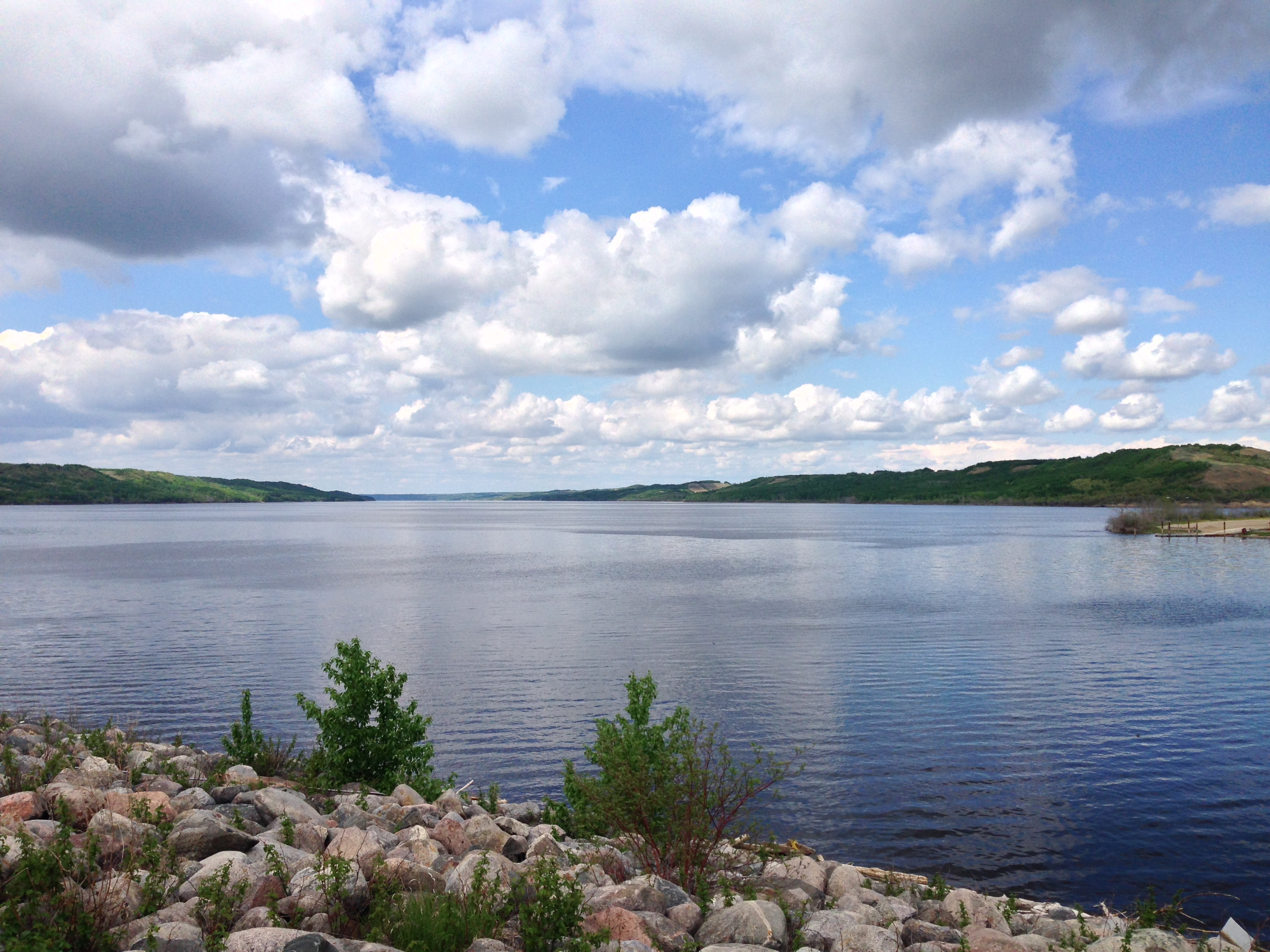
Lake of the Prairies from the Shellmouth Dam

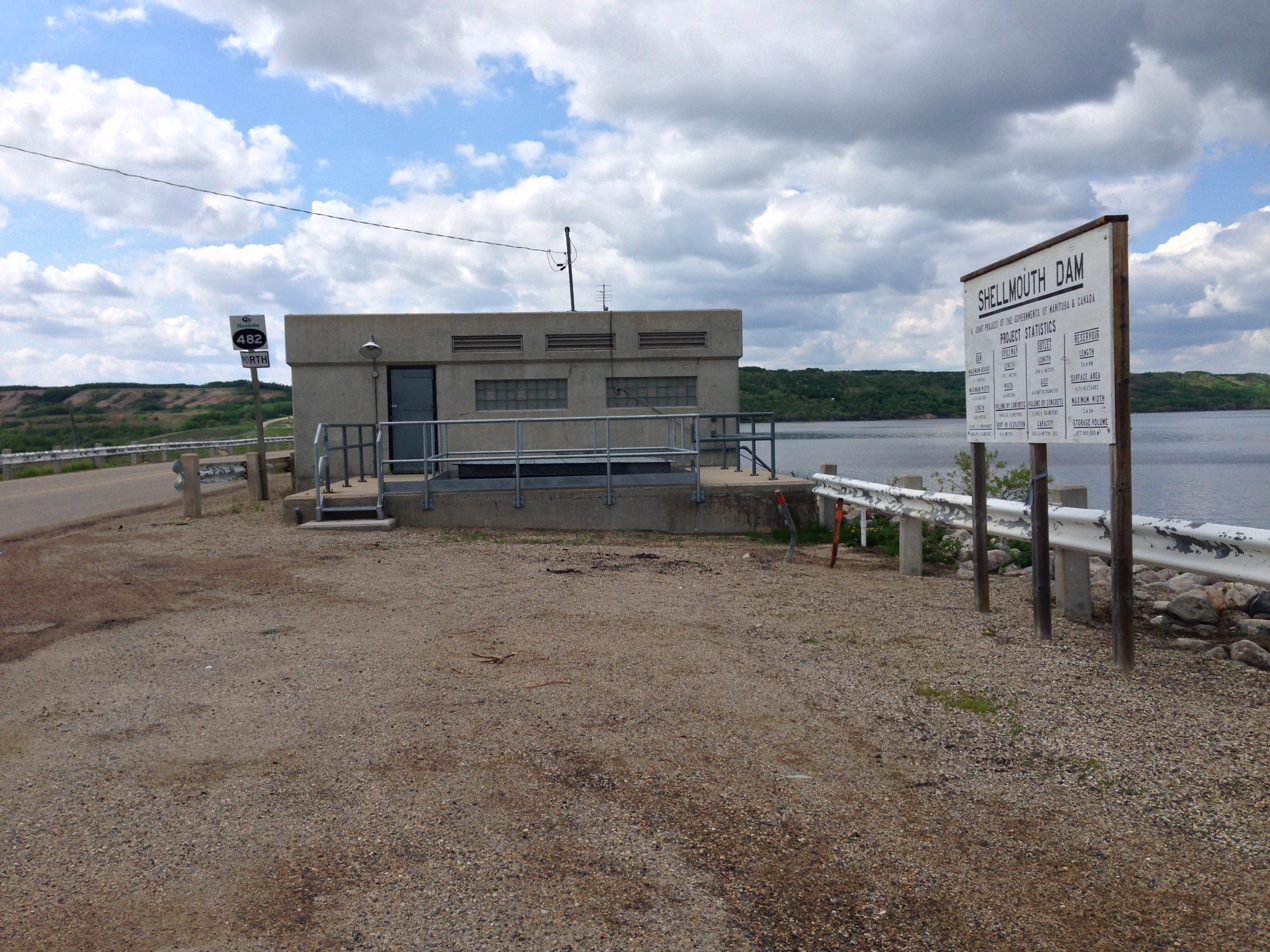
Shellmouth Dam Control Structure

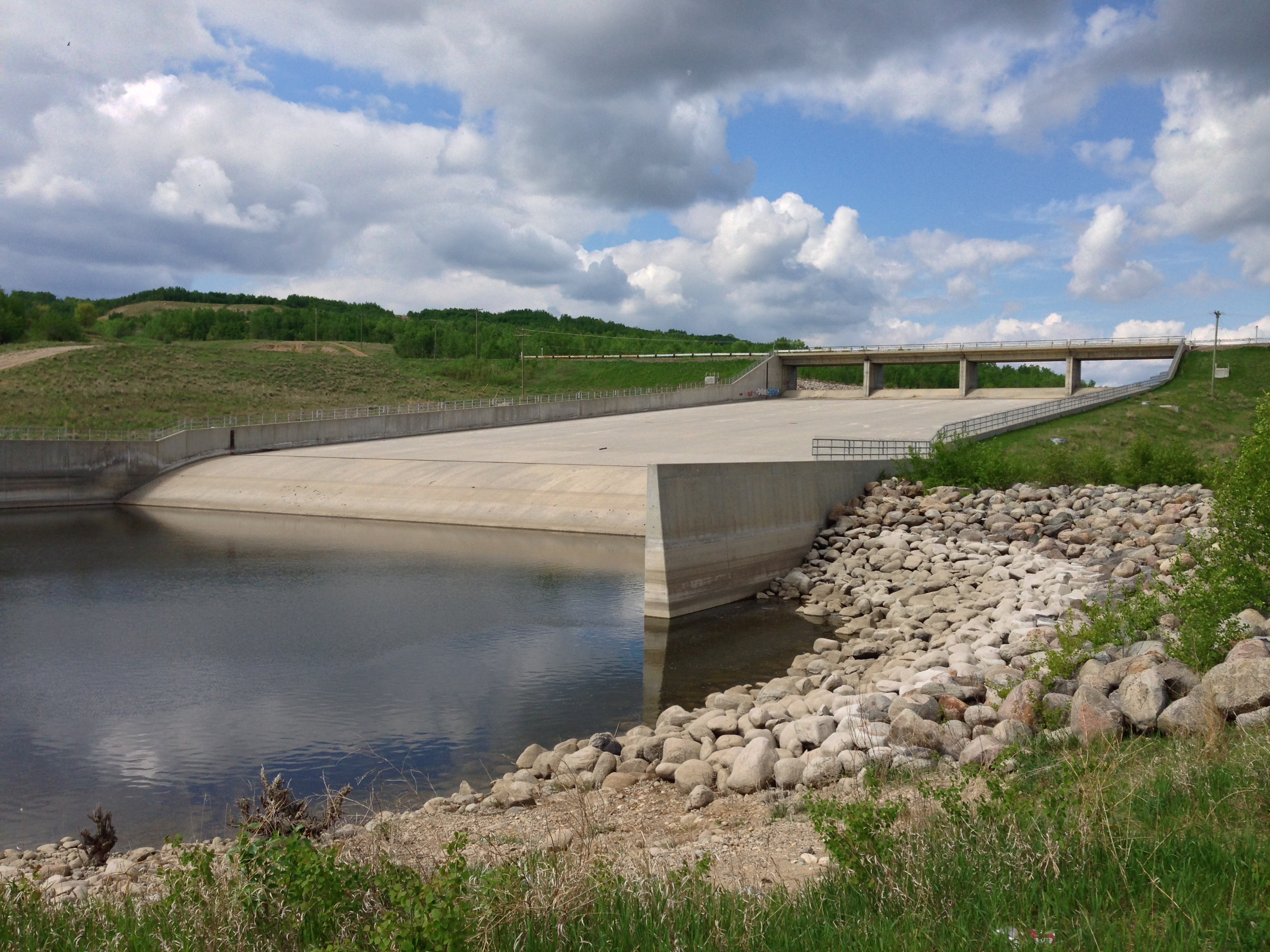
Shellmouth Dam Spillway

== See also ==
- List of lakes of Saskatchewan
- List of lakes of Manitoba
- Portage Diversion (Assiniboine River Floodway)
- Red River Floodway
