= Municipality of Swan Valley West =

Rural municipality in Manitoba, Canada

Swan Valley West
- Rural municipality
- Municipality of Swan Valley West
- Coordinates: 51°59′52″N 101°23′40″W
- Country: Canada
- Province: Manitoba
- Region: Parkland
- Incorporated (amalgamated): January 1, 2015

Area
  - Total: 1,716.84 km^{2} (662.88 sq mi)

Population (2021)
  - Total: 2,759
  - Density: 1.607/km^{2} (4.162/sq mi)
- Time zone: UTC-6 (CST)
  - Summer (DST): UTC-5 (CDT)
- Website: munswanvalleywest.com

The Municipality of Swan Valley West (MSVW) is a rural municipality (RM) in the Parkland Region of Manitoba, Canada. It is located in the far western portion of Manitoba, along the provincial border with Saskatchewan.

The town of Swan River is located within the RM, but is a separate urban municipality.

== History ==
The Municipality of Swan Valley West was incorporated on January 1, 2015, via the amalgamation of the RM of Swan River and the village of Benito. It was formed as a requirement of The Municipal Amalgamations Act, which required that municipalities with a population less than 1,000 amalgamate with one or more neighbouring municipalities by 2015. The Government of Manitoba initiated these amalgamations in order for municipalities to meet the 1997 minimum population requirement of 1,000 to incorporate a municipality.

== Communities ==
- Benito
- Durban
- Kenville

== Demographics ==
In the 2021 Census of Population conducted by Statistics Canada, Swan Valley West had a population of 2,759 living in 1,116 of its 1,232 total private dwellings, a change of −2.5% from its 2016 population of 2,829. With a land area of 1,716.84 km^{2} (662.88 sq mi), it had a population density of 1.6/km^{2} (4.2/sq mi) in 2021.

== See also ==
- Swan River, Manitoba
