= Roblin, Manitoba =

Roblin
- Municipality
- Municipality of Roblin
- Motto: Jewel of the Parkland
- Location of Roblin in Manitoba
- Coordinates: 51°13′48″N 101°21′20″W
- Country: Canada
- Province: Manitoba
- Census Division: No. 16
- Municipality: Roblin
- Named after: Rodmond Roblin

Government
  - Head of Council: Robert Misko
  - Deputy Head of Council: Gail Chescu
  - Chief Administrative Officer: Dione Cherneski
  - Assistant Administrative Officer: Cole A. Nickell

Area
  - Total: 2.57 km^{2} (0.99 sq mi)

Population (2016)
  - Total: 1,697
  - Density: 627.2/km^{2} (1,624/sq mi)
  - Change 2011-05: ▼5.3%
- Time zone: UTC−6 (CST)
  - Summer (DST): UTC−5 (CDT)
- Postal Code: R0L 1P0
- Area code: 204
- Highways: PTH 5 PTH 83
- Railways: Canadian National
- NTS Map: 62N3 Roblin
- GNBC Code: GAXGH
- Website: Official website

Roblin is an incorporated urban community located within the Municipality of Roblin in Manitoba, Canada. Situated approximately 400 kilometres (250 miles) northwest of Winnipeg, Manitoba.

Prior to 1 January 2015, Roblin was designated as a town. In 2010, the Town of Roblin and the former Rural Municipalities of Hillsburg and Shell River had a total population of 3,284.

About 40% of the population is involved in agriculture and other resource-based industries. Services, tourism and the processing of wood and agricultural products largely contribute to the local economy.

== History ==
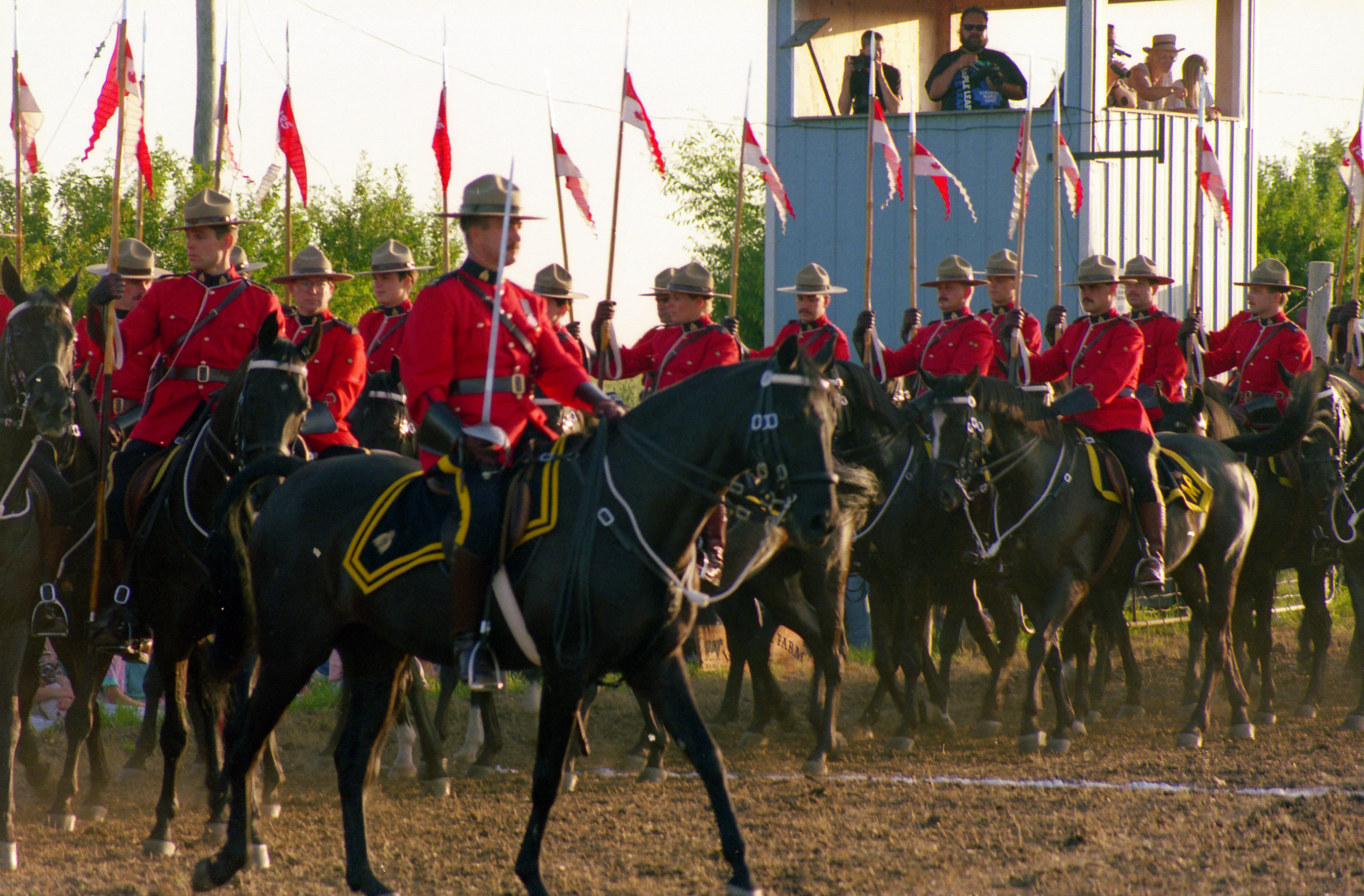
RCMP Musical Ride Parade in Roblin

During the 1880s, the first group of Europeans to settle in Roblin were mainly Cattle ranchers and grain farmers. In 1903, many Eastern European farming families also settled in Roblin with the arrival of the railway. The village was originally named Goose Lake but was renamed Roblin in 1904 after the Premier of Manitoba, Rodmond Palen Roblin. Also in 1904, the post office was established as Goose Lake and was located on 8-26-28W. The first postmaster was W. Atkey and the first mayor was Irwin L. Mitchell (1882-1956) who served from 1914 to 1917. In addition, Roblin also served as the location for the former Saint Vladimir's College. Later, on 1 May 1912, the village was incorporated and became a town. Roblin celebrated its 100th anniversary in July 2013. The current mayor of the municipality of Roblin is Robert Misko.

Krosney Lake (east of East Goose Lake) is a commemorative lake officially named by the Geographical Names Board of Canada in memory of Private Darren Michael Krosney (4 July 1965, Winnipeg, Manitoba – 21 August 1983).

== Demographics ==
According to the 2021 Census of Population conducted by Statistics Canada, Roblin had a population of 1,709 living in 820 of its 903 total private dwellings, a change of 0.7% from its 2016 population of 1,697. With a land area of 3.75 km^{2} (1.45 sq mi), it had a population density of 455.7/km^{2} (1,180.3/sq mi) in 2021.

== Recreation ==
Roblin is located on Goose Lake and Krosney Lake, and is within a short drive to Lake of the Prairies. The community is located between Duck Mountain Provincial Park and Riding Mountain National Park. Moreover, Roblin has a 9-hole golf course, outdoor swimming pool, ice arena, curling rink and movie theater.

== Transportation ==
Roblin is 90 km west of Dauphin via PTH 5, about a 45-minute drive east from Yorkton on PTH 5, and is accessible by the Roblin railway station, which is served by Via Rail.
