= Duck Mountain Provincial Park (Manitoba) =

Provincial park in Manitoba

- IUCN category II (national park)
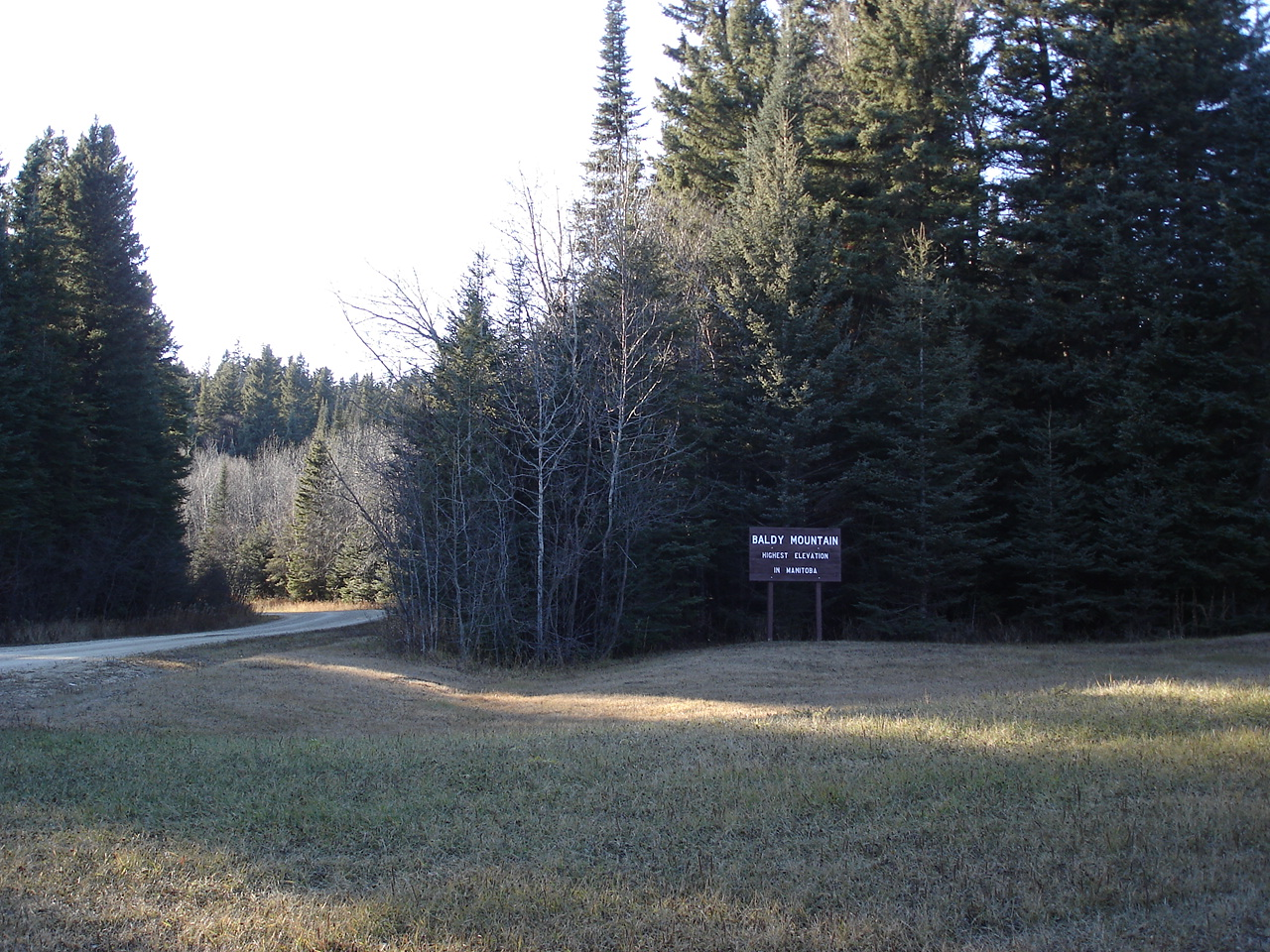
- Toward Baldy Mountain.

- Location within Manitoba
- Interactive map of Duck Mountain Provincial Park
- Location: Division No. 20, Manitoba, Canada
- Nearest town: Swan River
- Coordinates: 51°39′58″N 100°54′52″W
- Area: 1,424 km^{2} (550 sq mi)
- Established: 1961
- Governing body: Government of Manitoba

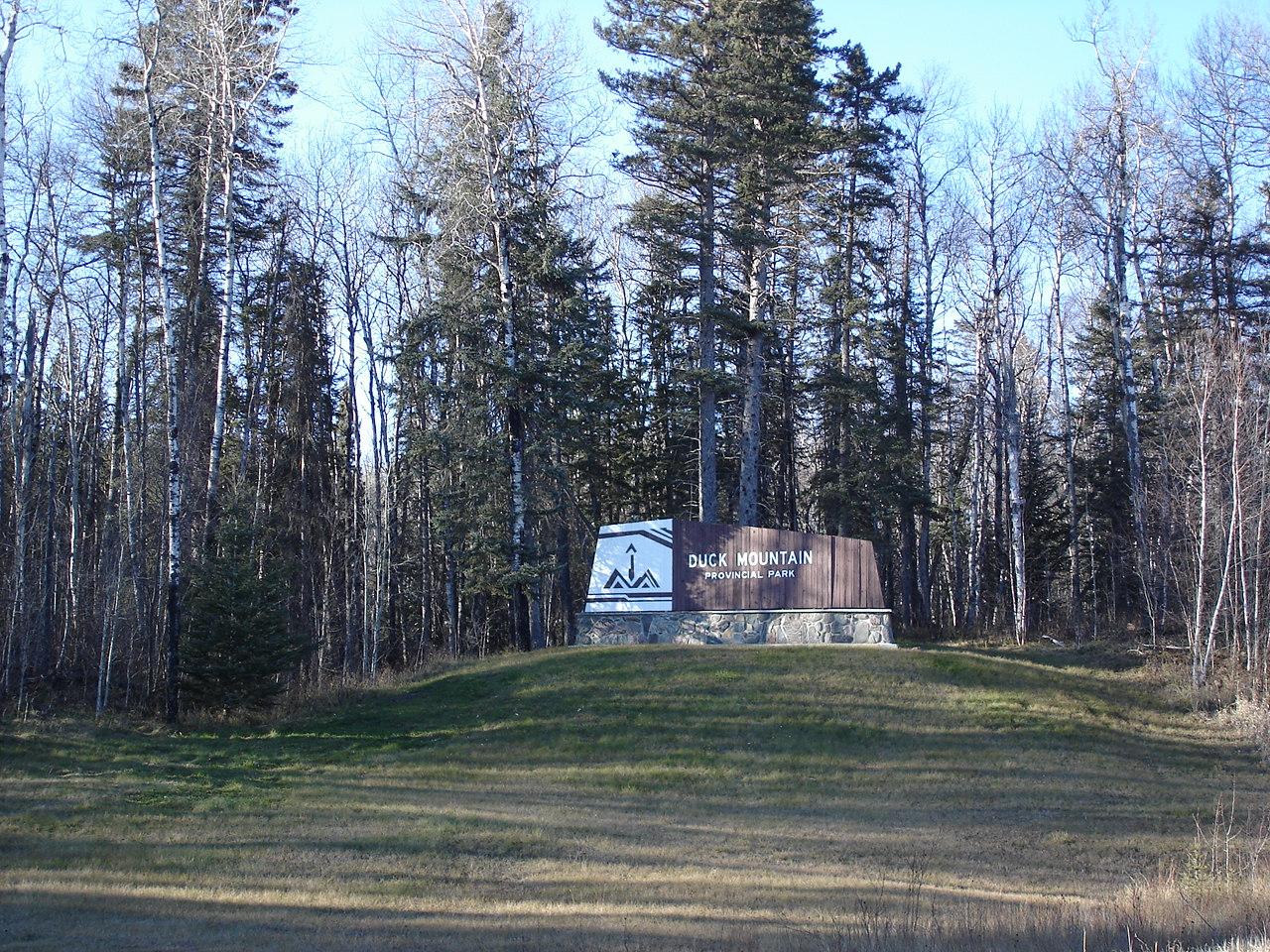
At the entrance to Duck Mountain Park.

Duck Mountain Provincial Park is a 1,424 square kilometre provincial park in western Manitoba. The park is located within the larger and similarly named Duck Mountain Provincial Forest. Duck Mountain Provincial Park was designated a provincial park by the Government of Manitoba in 1961. and is considered to be a Class II protected area under the IUCN protected area management categories. The park is unincorporated, not lying within the borders of any of Manitoba's rural municipalities.

The Duck Mountains are a rise of forested (formerly glaciated) land between the Saskatchewan prairie to the west and the Manitoba lowlands to the east. They are some 200m higher than the floor of the Assiniboine River valley to the west, and some 400m higher than the Manitoba lowlands. The highest point of the Duck Mountains is Baldy Mountain, which is also the highest point in Manitoba at 831 metres (2,726 ft) above mean sea level.

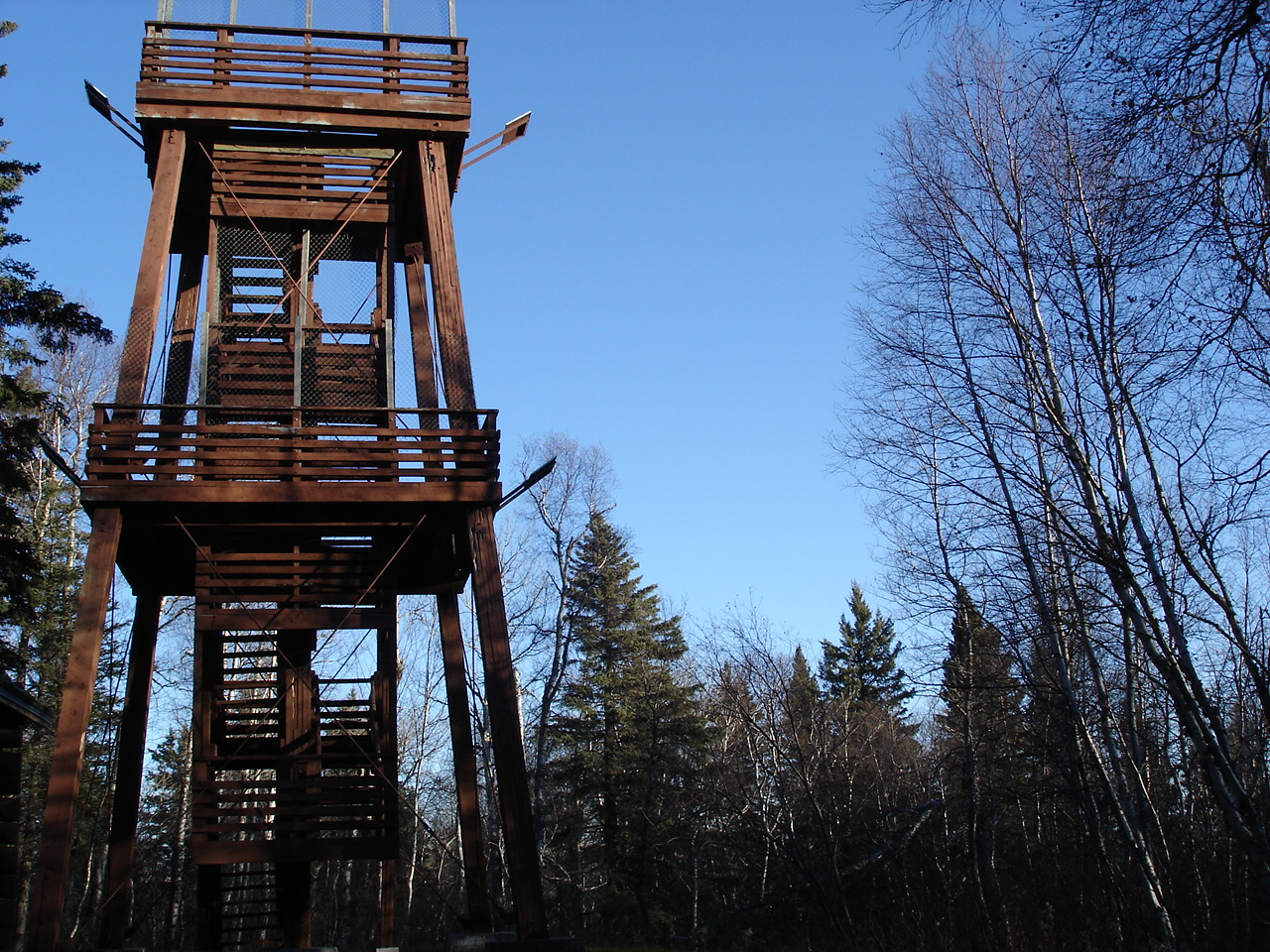
Observation tower.

Geologically, the Duck Mountains are part of the Manitoba Escarpment, along with the Turtle Mountains, the Riding Mountains, and the Porcupine Hills. Their underlying rocks are Cretaceous shales and (below that) sandstone, which overlie deeper deposits of Devonian limestone, which in turn overlie Precambrian granite. The vertical relief of the mountains is the result of erosion of the Cretaceous shale by the ancestral (pre Ice Age) Red River to the east, and by the ancestral Assiniboine River to the west, and so the Duck Mountain's apparent height is the result of a lowering of the surrounding prairie, rather than any orogen. Glacial scouring exaggerated the vertical relief of the mountains, and the glaciers deposited thick beds of glacial till that now overlay the bedrock. The post-ice age Duck Mountains then formed the western shore of Lake Agassiz. The flat bottom of Lake Agassiz now forms the Manitoba lowlands, and it is from these lowlands that the vertical relief of the Duck Mountains is most impressive (indeed, really the only place from which it is even readily noticeable), as the mountains provide an obvious contrast to the monotonous flat of Manitoba's prairie.

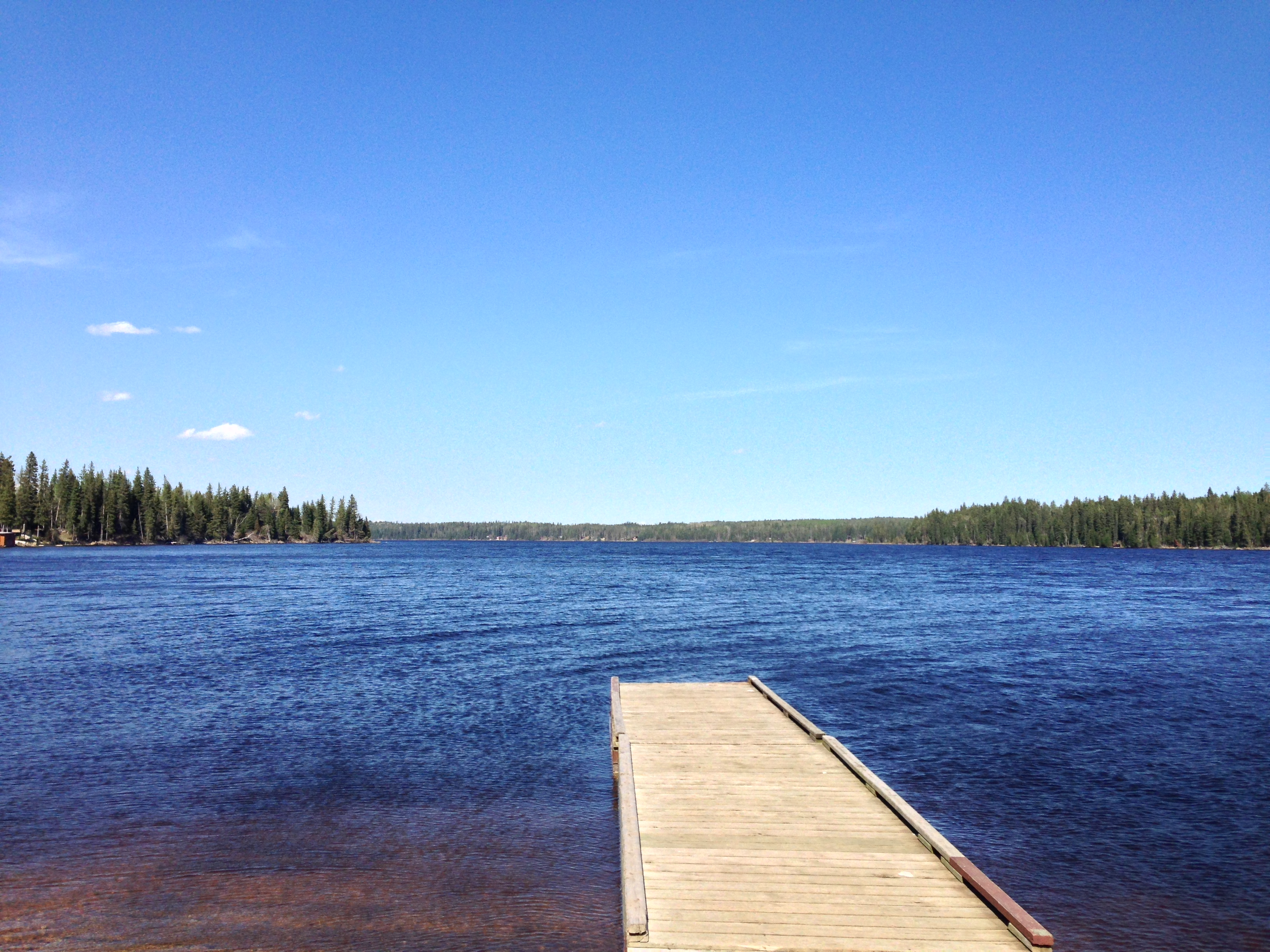
Singush Lake from Singush Lake Campground

The area represents the southern limit of the boreal forest in its transition zone to aspen parkland. The forest soils are stony and the landscape is rolling, with numerous ponds and creek channels. The forest trees include white spruce, black spruce, tamarack larch, balsam fir, jack pine, quaking aspen, balsam poplar, and paper birch.

The flatter land areas surrounding the forest have almost entirely been converted to cereal-grain farmland, making the forest (and the contiguous Saskatchewan Duck Mountain Provincial Park) an environmental refuge for such large animals as elk, moose, black bear, lynx, bobcat, and timber wolf. The existence of a breeding population of cougars is suspected but unconfirmed. It is likewise not known whether or not a breeding population of wolverines is present in the park, but the park is within that species' historical range. The park is also within the historical range of grizzly bears, but they are no longer found in the area. Other animals, such as the white-tailed deer and coyote, are found in abundance in the park, but roam more freely into the surrounding agricultural lands and are thus less reliant on it.

Duck Mountain Provincial Park is contained wholly within a larger protected area called Duck Mountain Provincial Forest; however, neither the Provincial Park nor the Provincial Forest are completely protected from resource extraction industries such as logging and hunting.

Child's Lake, East Blue Lake, Glad Lake, and Wellman Lake all have tourist facilities. These facilities may include boat launches, campgrounds, rental cottages, and privately owned vacation homes.

== See also ==
- List of protected areas of Manitoba
