= Saskatchewan Highway 5 =

Provincial highway in Saskatchewan, Canada

Highway 5
- Highway 5 highlighted in red

Route information
- Maintained by Ministry of Highways and Infrastructure & Transport Canada
- Length: 380.2 km (236.2 mi)

Major junctions
- West end: Highway 11 / Highway 16 (TCH) in Saskatoon
- Highway 41 in Saskatoon; Highway 2 near Meacham; Highway 6 / CanAm Highway at Watson; Highway 35 at Wadena; Highway 38 near Kuroki; Highway 47 at Buchanan; Highway 9 at Canora; Highway 8 at Kamsack; Highway 57 near Kamsack
- East end: PR 363 at Manitoba border near Togo

Location
- Country: Canada
- Province: Saskatchewan
- Rural municipalities: Corman Park No. 344, Blucher No. 343, Colonsay No. 342, St. Peter No. 369, Lakeside No. 338, Lakeview No. 337, Sasman No. 336, Invermay No. 305, Good Lake No. 274, Cote No. 271
- Major cities: Saskatoon, Humboldt

Highway system
- Provincial highways in Saskatchewan
← Highway 4	→ Highway 6

Highway 5 is a major provincial highway in Saskatchewan, Canada. It begins in downtown Saskatoon and runs eastward to the Manitoba border near Togo, where it becomes Provincial Road 363. The highway is approximately 393 kilometres (244 mi) long. Between the early 1900s and 1976, Provincial Highway 5 was a trans-provincial highway travelling approximately 630 kilometres (390 mi) in length. At this time it started at the Alberta border in Lloydminster and travelled east to the Manitoba border.

Most of Highway 5 is a primary weight corridor for trucking. It is a two-laned highway for most of its length with only the section through Saskatoon being four lanes. Plans to eventually twin the highway from Saskatoon east to Highway 2 are in the works. Ten kilometres of twinning of the highway from Saskatoon east to 1.6 kilometres (1 mi) past Highway 316 is expected to be completed by the fall of 2027.

In the summer of 1970, the section of highway between Lloydminster and Saskatoon was designated to be a portion of the Yellowhead Highway. This section of highway maintained the Highway 5 designation until 1976, when it was redesignated as Highway 16 to maintain the same number through the four western provinces (Manitoba followed suit the following year, redesignating its section of the Yellowhead Highway from PTH 4 to PTH 16). This redesignation shortened the length of Highway 5 to its current length of 393 kilometres (244 mi).

Along the route are several heritage sites, an international bird watching area, saline lakes, as well as regional and provincial parks. Museums and historical markers commemorate the region's history along the highway.

== History ==
The early Red River cart trail traversed the North-West Territory prairies between Portage la Prairie and Edmonton via Humboldt and Battleford, intersecting the future location of Highway 5 at Humboldt. The Dominion Government Telegraph Line was constructed in 1875, which was parallel to the future Highway 5. Both Red River Cart trail and telegraph line were abandoned in the 1920s.

January 3, 1910, was the first meeting of the RM of Blucher 343. In 1911, early homesteaders could choose to pay taxes at $9.00 per quarter section of land or working off $4.00 of this expense by constructing roads. A labourer and two horse team could earn 50 cents an hour and a four-horse team with a driver was allotted 70 cents an hour.

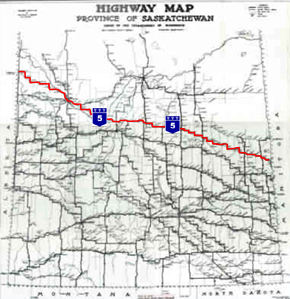
Map showing the original routing and length of Highway 5

In 1925, Provincial Highway 5, the Evergreen Route, followed the surveyed rail line route of the Canadian Northern Railway, later the Canadian National Railway. Provincial Highway 5 had a western terminus at Lloydminster located on the Alberta–Saskatchewan border. When the province was surveyed, the road evolved from a dirt road to a gravel road. This was finally improved to an all-weather road known as Provincial Highway 5 from the Alberta–Saskatchewan border bypassing Saskatoon to the north, and continuing on to the Manitoba–Saskatchewan border. Just as the rail line went through Aberdeen, Warman, and Langham, so too did Provincial Highway 5.

In 1925, access from Saskatoon to Provincial Highway 5 was via Provincial Highway 12 which was a route due north of the city. The other connection was Provincial Highway 27 which travelled east and north from Saskatoon connecting to Provincial Highway 5 at the junction located at the town of Aberdeen. In the late 1950s and 1960s, the highway was straightened and widened. During this process, the current Saskatchewan Highway 5 connected Humboldt and Saskatoon in a more direct west and east highway. The old place names of Warman, Aberdeen, Vonda, Prudhomme, Dana, Bruno, and Carmel located on Provincial Highway 5 were no longer place names along Saskatchewan Highway 5. Now the Highway 2 concurrency was the only north–south stretch between Humboldt and Saskatoon and Meacham the only place name. On August 15, 1970, the Yellowhead was opened for the northern Trans-Canada route and the northwestern half of Provincial Highway 5 between Saskatoon and Lloydminster was designated as Highway 16, the Yellowhead route.

Travel along the Provincial Highway 5 before the 1940s would have been travelling on the "square" following the township road allowances, barbed wire fencing and rail lines. As the surveyed township roads were the easiest to travel, the first highway was designed on 90-degree, right-angle corners as the distance traversed the prairie along range roads and township roads.

Highway 5 was constructed through Englefeld in 1961.

=== Upgrades ===
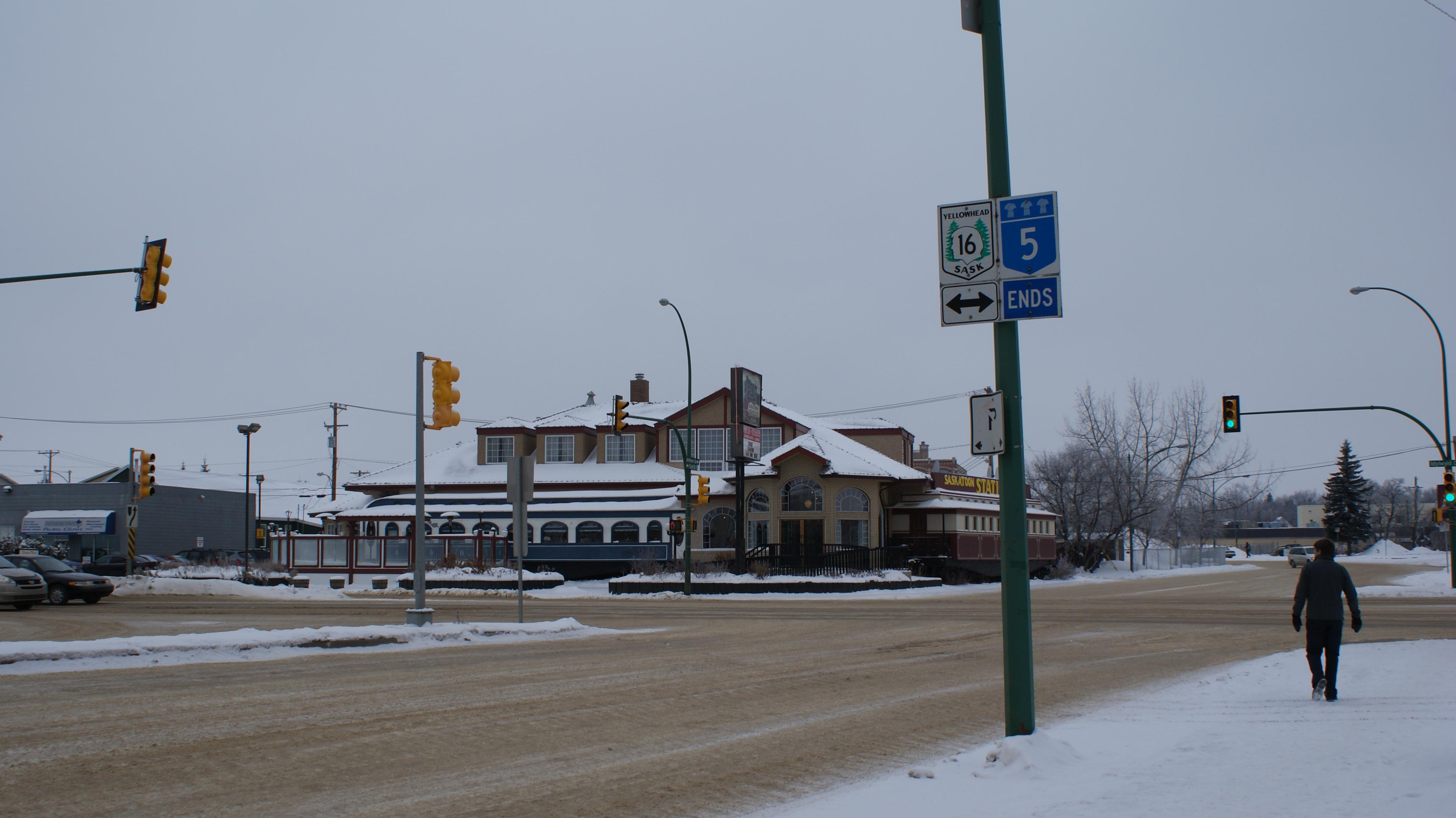
Highway 5 ends signage at the former junction of 5 (23rd St) and 16 (Idylwyld Dr) in Saskatoon. Highway 5 now follows 25th Street to Idylwyld Drive.

Canadian Pacific Railway crossing lights were installed on Highway 5 at the east end of Humboldt. At the junction of Highway 20 and Highway 5, there were traffic lights installed in 1973.

A resurfacing improvement project was undertaken for an 11.7-kilometre (7.3 mi) stretch between Mikado and Canora. The $1 million project was completed in the summer of 2001. In the summer of 2000, 13.1 kilometres (8.1 mi) received resurfacing improvements between Veregin and Mikado. In February 2003, the Department of Highways awarded a tender to resurface 8 kilometres (5.0 mi) from Quill Lake and eastward. "We are maintaining our focus on building better highways. Work on this $940,000 resurfacing project ... should be complete within two weeks", said Highways and Transportation Minister Mark Wartman.

In October 2025, 15 kilometres (9.3 mi) of upgrades were completed in the St. Denis area that included "shoulder widening, resurfacing and one set of passing lanes". The work also involved re-aligning the access road north to St. Denis (Highway 671) and Range Road 314 to the south. This work is part of a $147 million project to improve Highway 5. Other related work included the completion of two sets of passing lanes in 2018 between Humboldt and Highway 2 and one set in 2025 just west of Highway 2.

== Route description ==
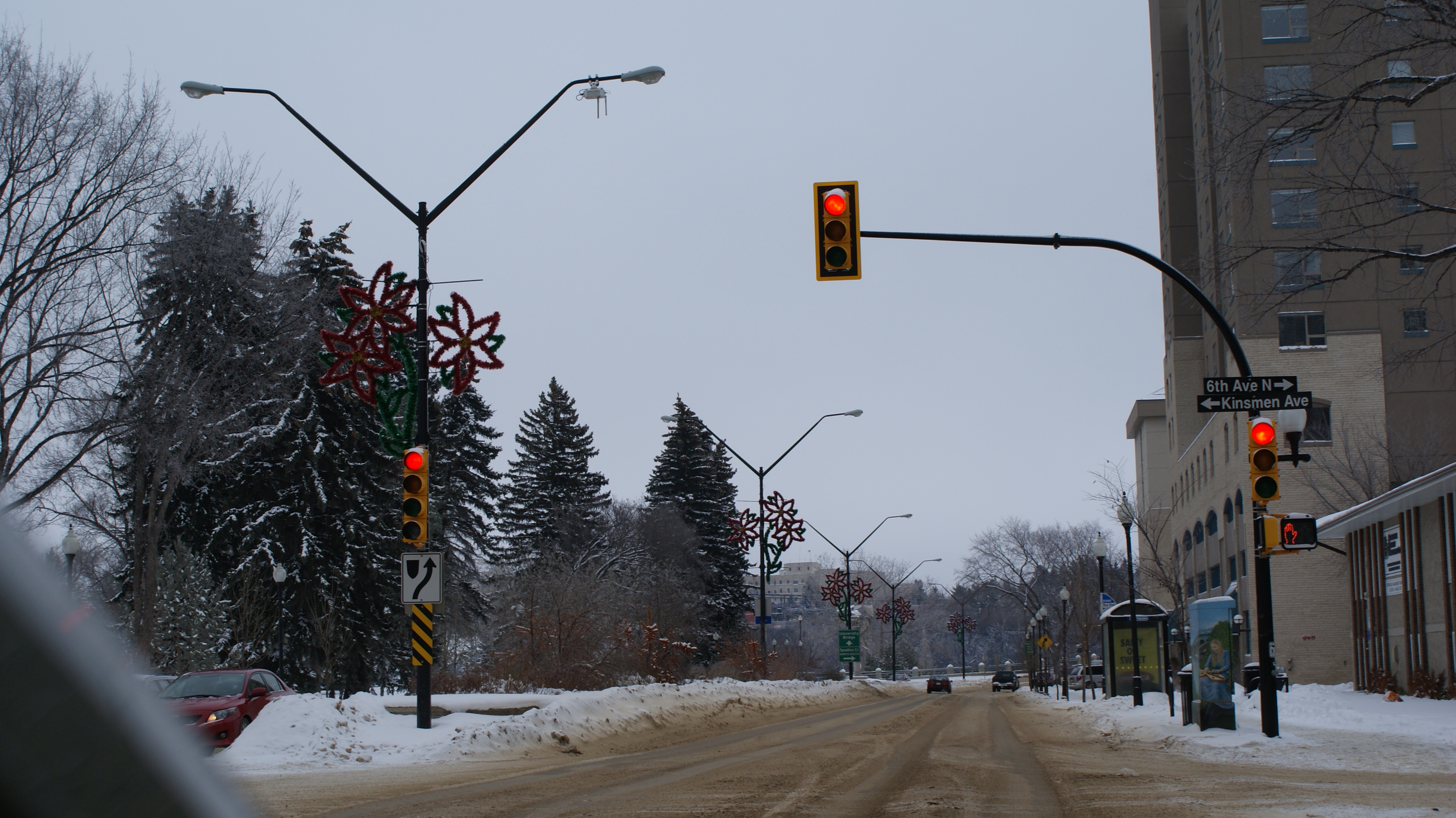
25th Street approaching University Bridge.

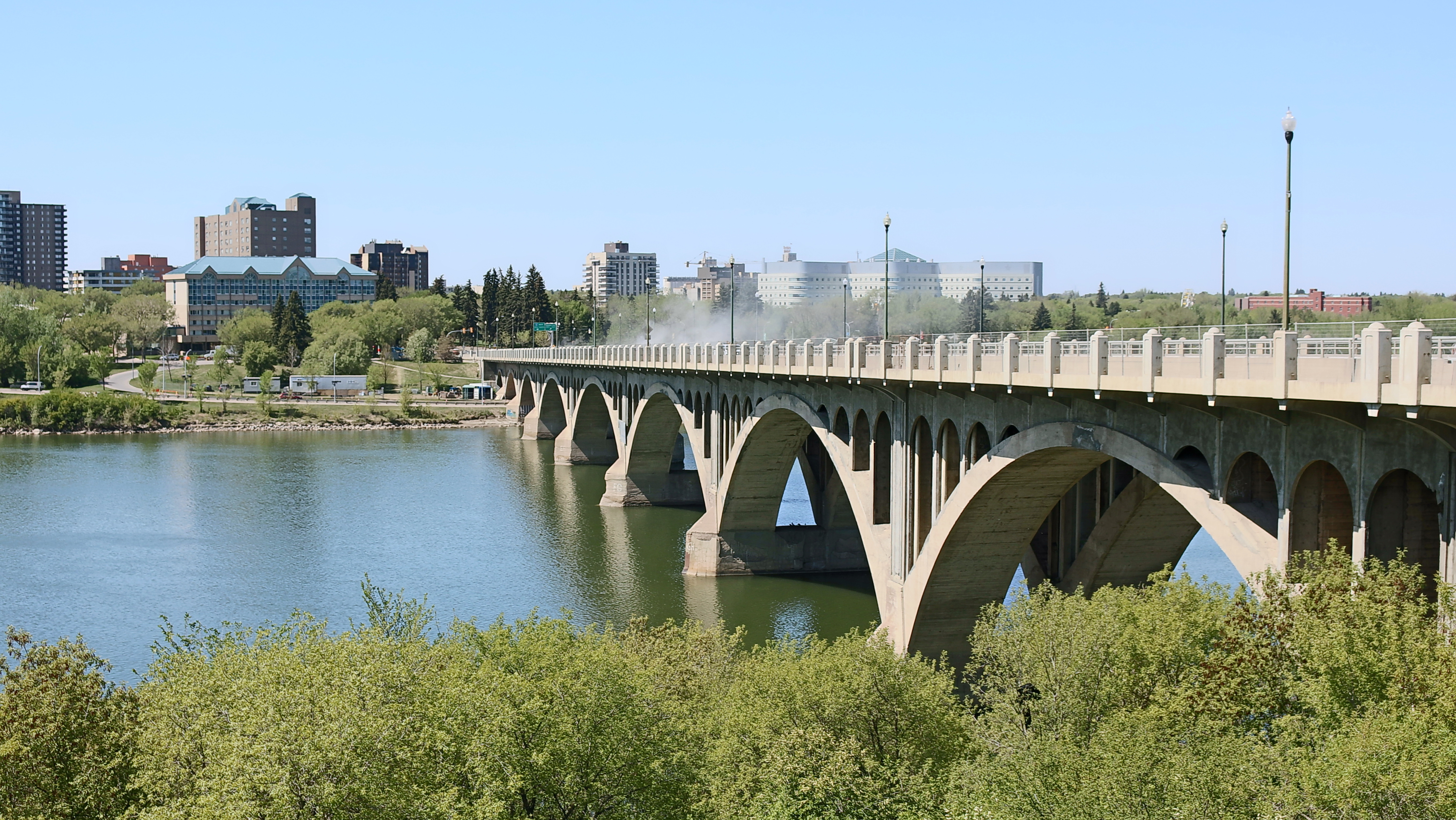
University Bridge

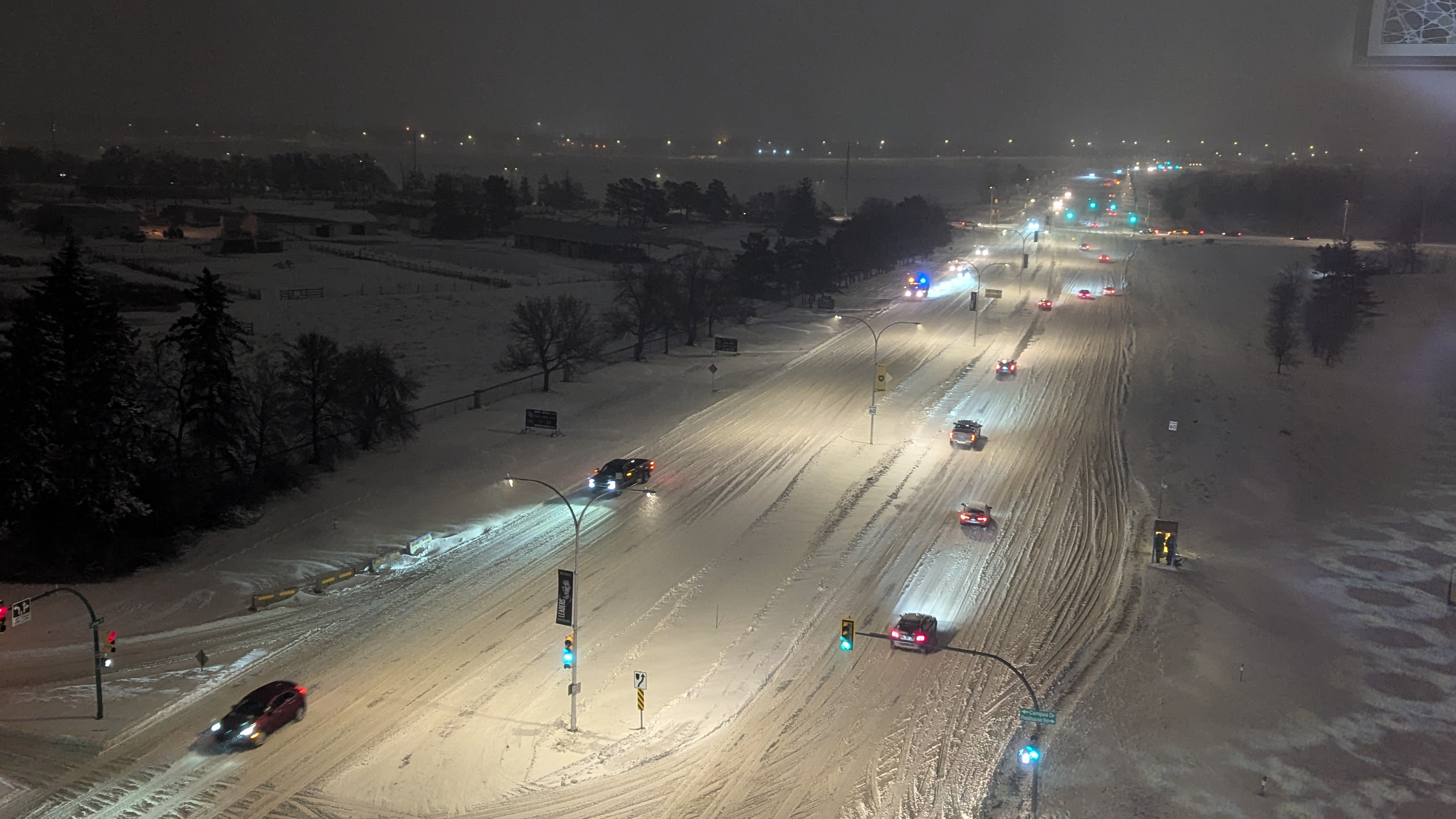
College Drive

Highway 5's western terminus begins in downtown Saskatoon at Idylwyld Drive (Highway 11) as 25th Street East. The highway's starting point is near the Saskatoon Railway Station. From there, it heads east as a four-lane highway through downtown to an interchange with Spadina Crescent. It then crosses the South Saskatchewan River via the University Bridge as 25th Street and Clarence Avenue. Once across the river, 25th Street ends and Clarence Avenue turns south while Highway 5 travels east as College Drive. On the north side of the highway, it gives access to the Royal University Hospital and the University of Saskatchewan. Continuing east, once past the intersection with Cumberland Avenue North, it becomes a divided highway. The next two intersections are Campus Drive and Preston Avenue North. College Drive intersects with Circle Drive (Highway 16) further east, at a partial cloverleaf that opened in 2006. Continuing east, as Highway 5 works its way through Saskatoon, it has a seagull intersection with Central Avenue and interchanges with McKercher Drive and McOrmond Drive. It then meets the southern terminus of Highway 41. About 1.5 kilometres (0.93 mi) east of Highway 41, Highway 5 becomes a two-lane highway and then, 100 metres (330 ft) later, it leaves Saskatoon's city limits.

Highway 5 continues east towards Highway 2 for about 50 kilometres (31 mi) once it leaves Saskatoon. The government of Saskatchewan is developing plans to twin Highway 5 from Saskatoon to Highway 2. Along this segment of highway, access is provided to the communities of Strawberry Hills, Discovery Ridge, and Sunset Estates mobile home park. It also intersects Highways 316 and 671 and runs along the northern shore of Patience Lake. By the fall of 2027, Highway 5 is expected to be twinned to a point 1.6 kilometres (1 mi) east of Highway 316. Once at Highway 2, the two highways begin a northbound concurrency. After 6 kilometres (3.7 mi), the concurrency ends with 2 continuing north and 5 resuming its eastbound routing towards the city of Humboldt. Almost 5 kilometres (3.1 mi) after leaving Highway 2, is the community of Peterson. It is about this point that the landscape transitions from moist mixed grassland to aspen parkland. Continuing east, Highway 5 intersects Highways 670 and 669 and provides access to Dixon. East of Dixon, Highway 5 enters the Humboldt and has an intersection with Highway 20 near the centre of town.

Highway 5 leaves Humboldt at the eastern end of town and then begins a south-east trajectory to its eastern terminus at the Manitoba border. About 42 kilometres (26 mi) east of Highway 20 and Humboldt, Highway 5 intersects Highway 6 at Watson. Between Watson and Humboldt, Highway 5 provides access to Muenster, St. Gregor, and Englefeld. It also intersects Highway 368 and Highway 667. Once Highway 5 reaches Watson, it has a 270-metre (890 ft) long southbound concurrency with Highway 6. It leaves the concurrency and travels through Watson as Railway Avenue. Once it leaves Watson, the highway travels south-east for 54 kilometres (34 mi) to Wadena and Highway 35. Along this segment, it provides access to Quill Lake and Clair and intersects Highway 640. South of the highway are the Quill Lakes, which consist of three salt lakes that are part of the Western Hemisphere Shorebird Reserve Network.

On the west side of Wadena, Highway 5 enters the town as Pamela Wallin Drive, which was named after Pamela Wallin, a Canadian senator. Near the centre of town, Highway 5 intersects Highway 35 and then continues south-east to Kylemore, Highway 665, Kuroki, and the southern terminus of Highway 38. South of the highway at this point is Fishing Lake. The lake's amenities, including Leslie Beach Regional Park, are accessed just east of Kuroki from Highway 310. Highway 5 continues south-east for a further 78 kilometres (48 mi) to Highway 9 and the town of Canora. The communities of Margo, Invermay, Rama, Dernic, Buchanan, and Tiny are found along this segment. Highway 5 intersects Highway 47 at Buchanan. Southbound on 47 is Good Spirit Lake Provincial Park. At the town of Canora, Highway 5 has a 2-kilometre (1.2 mi) long southbound concurrency with Highway 9, the Saskota Flyway.

Once Highway 5 leaves the concurrency, it heads east across the Whitesand River and intersects Highway 650. From 650, it heads south-east to Mikado and Highway 750 and Veregin and Highway 637. Travelling east of Veregin, Highway 5 drops into the Assiniboine Valley where it crosses the Assiniboine River. Climbing out of the valley, the highway intersects Highway 8 and enters the town of Kamsack as Queen Elizabeth Boulevard. Heading east out of town, Highway 5 meets the western terminus of Highway 57. Highway 57 continues north-east into Duck Mountain Provincial Park while Highway 5 drops south. The highway parallels the Assiniboine River for roughly 11 kilometres (6.8 mi) and provides access to Coté. It then turns east to Runnymede, then south-east to Togo, Highways 357 and 369, and the Manitoba border. The highway continues into Manitoba as Provincial Road 363.

== Major intersections ==
From west to east:

Rural municipality	Location	km	mi	Destinations	Notes
City of Saskatoon		0.0	0.0	Idylwyld Drive (Highway 11) to Highway 16 – Regina, Yorkton, Prince Albert, Battlefords; To Highway 7 west / Highway 14 west (22nd Street) – Rosetown, Biggar	Highway 5 western terminus
City of Saskatoon		0.5	0.31	1st Avenue N	Former 25th Street western terminus; Highway 5 formerly followed 1st Avenue and 23rd Street to Idylwyld Drive
City of Saskatoon		1.3	0.81	Spadina Crescent	Interchange
City of Saskatoon		1.5	0.93	University Bridge across South Saskatchewan River	
City of Saskatoon		1.8	1.1	Clarence Avenue	Becomes College Drive
City of Saskatoon		1.8– 3.4	1.1– 2.1	Passes University of Saskatchewan	
City of Saskatoon		3.4	2.1	Preston Avenue	
City of Saskatoon		4.4	2.7	Circle Drive (Highway 16 to Highway 11) – Airport	Interchange
City of Saskatoon		5.0	3.1	Central Avenue	Seagull intersection
City of Saskatoon		6.0	3.7	McKercher Drive	Interchange
City of Saskatoon		8.6	5.3	McOrmond Drive	Interchange
City of Saskatoon		10.6	6.6	Highway 41 east – Melfort	
Corman Park No. 344	No major junctions				
Aberdeen No. 373– Blucher No. 343 boundary		20.3	12.6	Highway 316 south – Clavet	
Grant No. 372– Blucher No. 343 boundary		39.8	24.7	Highway 671 north – St. Denis, Vonda	
Colonsay No. 342– Bayne No. 371 boundary		62.4	38.8	Highway 2 south (Veterans Memorial Highway) – Watrous, Moose Jaw	West end of Highway 2 concurrency
Bayne No. 371		68.2	42.4	Highway 2 north (Veterans Memorial Highway) – Prince Albert	East end of Highway 2 concurrency
Bayne No. 371		80.2	49.8	Highway 670 – Bruno, Viscount	
Humboldt No. 370		95.9	59.6	Carmel access road	
Humboldt No. 370		104.0	64.6	Highway 669 north	
City of Humboldt		112.9	70.2	Highway 20 (Main Street) – Birch Hills, Lanigan	
Humboldt No. 370		117.8	73.2	Highway 667 north	West end of Highway 667 concurrency
St. Peter No. 369	Muenster	122.5	76.1	Highway 368 north – Lake Lenore, St. Brieux	
St. Peter No. 369	St. Gregor	132.7	82.5	Highway 667 south – Esk	East end of Highway 667 concurrency
St. Peter No. 369	Englefeld	145.6	90.5	Main Street	
Lakeside No. 338	Watson	154.7	96.1	Highway 6 / CanAm Highway north – Melfort	West end of Highway 5 concurrency
Lakeside No. 338	Watson	154.9	96.3	Highway 6 / CanAm Highway south – Regina	East end of Highway 2 concurrency
Lakeside No. 338	Quill Lake	175.7	109.2	Highway 640 – Wynyard, Punnichy	
Lakeview No. 337	Clair	192.1	119.4		
Lakeview No. 337	Wadena	208.9	129.8	Highway 35 (Main Street) – Tisdale, Fort Qu'Appelle	
Lakeview No. 337	Wadena	210.7	130.9	Highway 755 east (Lone Tree Road)	
Sasman No. 336	Kylemore	221.2	137.4	Highway 665 north	
Sasman No. 336	Kuroki	231.4	143.8	Highway 38 north – Kelvington	
Sasman No. 336		233.1	144.8	Highway 310 south – Foam Lake	
Sasman No. 336	Margo	244.1	151.7		
Invermay No. 305	Invermay	255.7	158.9	Highway 617 – Lintlaw, Sheho	
Invermay No. 305	Rama	275.3	171.1	Highway 754 north – Hazel Dell	
Buchanan No. 304	Buchanan	286.1	177.8	Highway 47 – Preeceville, Springside, Melville	
Buchanan No. 304	Buchanan	287.1	178.4	Highway 754 east	
Buchanan No. 304	Tiny	298.5	185.5	Highway 664 north – Sturgis	
Good Lake No. 274		308.6	191.8	Highway 651 west – Theodore	
Good Lake No. 274	Canora	311.1	193.3	Highway 9 north (Norway Road) – Preeceville, Hudson Bay	West end of Highway 9 concurrency
Good Lake No. 274	Canora	312.5	194.2	Highway 9 south – Yorkton	East end of Highway 9 concurrency
Sliding Hills No. 273		317.4	197.2	Highway 650 south	West end of Highway 650 concurrency
Sliding Hills No. 273	Mikado	324.2	201.4	Highway 650 north – Hyas	East end of Highway 650 concurrency
Sliding Hills No. 273	Veregin	337.6	209.8	Highway 637 – Norquay, Rhein	
Cote No. 271	Kamsack	349.2	217.0	Crosses the Assiniboine River	
Cote No. 271	Kamsack	349.8– 350.0	217.4– 217.5	Highway 8 – Pelly, Norquay, Langenburg, Esterhazy	
Cote No. 271		357.9	222.4	Highway 57 east – Madge Lake	
Cote No. 271		382.9	237.9	Highway 369 south	
Cote No. 271	Togo	383.4	238.2	Highway 357 west	
Cote No. 271		384.6	239.0	PR 363 east to PTH 83	Continuation into Manitoba
1.000 mi = 1.609 km; 1.000 km = 0.621 mi: Concurrency terminus; Route transition

== See also ==
- Transportation in Saskatchewan
- Roads in Saskatchewan
