= Saskatchewan Highway 357 =

Provincial highway in Saskatchewan, Canada

Highway 357

Route information
- Maintained by Ministry of Highways and Infrastructure
- Length: 20.5 km (12.7 mi)

Major junctions
- West end: Highway 8 south of Kamsack
- Highway 369 at Togo
- East end: Highway 5 at Togo

Location
- Country: Canada
- Province: Saskatchewan
- Rural municipalities: Cote

Highway system
- Provincial highways in Saskatchewan
| ← Highway 355 | → Highway 358 |

Highway 357 is a provincial highway in the Canadian province of Saskatchewan. It runs from Highway 8 south of Kamsack to Highway 5 and Highway 369 at Togo. Located entirely within the Rural Municipality of Cote No. 271, the highway is a paved two-lane for its entire length and includes a bridge across the Assiniboine River. Highway 357 is about 21 kilometres (13 mi) long.

== Major intersections ==
From west to east:

| Rural municipality | Location | km | mi | Destinations | Notes |
|---|---|---|---|---|---|
| Cote No. 271 | | 0.0 | 0.0 | Highway 8 to Highway 10 – Wroxton, Kamsack | Western terminus; road continues west as Township Road 281 |
| Cote No. 271 | | 9.1 | 5.7 | Bridge over the Assiniboine River | |
| Cote No. 271 | Togo | 20.1 | 12.5 | Highway 369 to Highway 5 | |
| Cote No. 271 | Togo | 20.5 | 12.7 | Highway 5 – Kamsack, Runnymede, Roblin | Eastern terminus; Y-intersection; road continues as eastbound Hwy 5 |
1.000 mi = 1.609 km; 1.000 km = 0.621 mi

== See also ==
- Transportation in Saskatchewan
- Roads in Saskatchewan
