= Kuroki, Saskatchewan =

Community in Saskatchewan

Kuroki
- Organized hamlet
- Location within Saskatchewan Location within Canada
- Coordinates: 51°52′21″N 103°29′37″W
- Country: Canada
- Province: Saskatchewan
- Region: East-central
- Census division: 10
- Rural municipality: Sasman No. 336

Government
  - Governing body: Kuroki Council

Area
  - Total: 0.59 km^{2} (0.23 sq mi)

Population (2016)
  - Total: 50
  - Density: 84.6/km^{2} (219/sq mi)
- Time zone: CST
- Area code: 306
- Highways: Highway 5, Highway 38 & Highway 310
- Railways: Canadian National Railway

Kuroki is a hamlet in the Rural Municipality of Sasman No. 336, Saskatchewan, Canada. Listed as a designated place by Statistics Canada, the hamlet had a population of 50 in the Canada 2016 Census. The community is named after the Japanese general Kuroki Tamemoto.

== Demographics ==
In the 2021 Census of Population conducted by Statistics Canada, Kuroki had a population of 35 living in 24 of its 31 total private dwellings, a change of −30% from its 2016 population of 50. With a land area of 0.53 km^{2} (0.20 sq mi), it had a population density of 66.0/km^{2} (171.0/sq mi) in 2021.

Canada census – Kuroki, Saskatchewan community profile

	2016
Population	50 (+ 11.1% from 2011)
Land area	0.59 km^{2} (0.23 sq mi)
Population density	84.6/km^{2} (219/sq mi)
Median age	53.5 (M: 51.5, F: 56.0)
Private dwellings	38 (total)
Median household income	$N/A

References: 2016

== History ==
The village was founded after several Japanese victories in the Russo-Japanese War. As Britain was allied with Japan, Canada, as a dominion in the British Empire, also had positive relationships with Japan, even sending a military attaché (Herbert Cyril Thacker) to assist the Japanese. Three towns in Saskatchewan along the CN line (Togo, Kuroki, and Mikado), a regional park (Oyama), and CN Siding (Fukushiama) were named in honour of Japanese achievements in this war.

== Attractions ==
A Japanese Garden was created by residents, complete with rock gardens and small pond. It has a sign in Japanese saying "Kuroki Japanese Gardens". On the western edge of town there is a small Ukrainian Orthodox church and St. Helena Cemetery. The grain elevator still stands in good condition but has been purchased and is now owned privately.

== Climate ==
Climate data for Kuroki
Month	Jan	Feb	Mar	Apr	May	Jun	Jul	Aug	Sep	Oct	Nov	Dec	Year
Record high °C (°F)	5 (41)	9 (48)	19.5 (67.1)	30 (86)	37.5 (99.5)	38.5 (101.3)	38.5 (101.3)	39.4 (102.9)	36.7 (98.1)	28.9 (84.0)	18.3 (64.9)	9 (48)	39.4 (102.9)
Mean daily maximum °C (°F)	−13.4 (7.9)	−9.8 (14.4)	−2.7 (27.1)	8.4 (47.1)	17.8 (64.0)	21.8 (71.2)	23.7 (74.7)	23 (73)	16.3 (61.3)	8.9 (48.0)	−3.7 (25.3)	−11.3 (11.7)	6.6 (43.9)
Daily mean °C (°F)	−18.2 (−0.8)	−14.7 (5.5)	−7.7 (18.1)	2.8 (37.0)	11 (52)	15.4 (59.7)	17.4 (63.3)	16.4 (61.5)	10.3 (50.5)	3.5 (38.3)	−7.5 (18.5)	−15.9 (3.4)	1.1 (34.0)
Mean daily minimum °C (°F)	−23 (−9)	−19.6 (−3.3)	−12.6 (9.3)	−2.8 (27.0)	4.2 (39.6)	8.9 (48.0)	11 (52)	9.8 (49.6)	4.3 (39.7)	−2 (28)	−11.4 (11.5)	−20.4 (−4.7)	−4.5 (23.9)
Record low °C (°F)	−45.6 (−50.1)	−43.9 (−47.0)	−42.8 (−45.0)	−30 (−22)	−11.1 (12.0)	−4 (25)	0 (32)	−4 (25)	−10 (14)	−23.3 (−9.9)	−35 (−31)	−44 (−47)	−45.6 (−50.1)
Average precipitation mm (inches)	24.7 (0.97)	20.2 (0.80)	30.2 (1.19)	28.1 (1.11)	47.8 (1.88)	69 (2.7)	75.1 (2.96)	54.9 (2.16)	43.6 (1.72)	23.5 (0.93)	24.1 (0.95)	26.1 (1.03)	467.3 (18.40)
Source: Environment Canada

== See also ==
- List of communities in Saskatchewan
- List of hamlets in Saskatchewan
