= Saskatchewan Highway 369 =

Provincial highway in Saskatchewan, Canada

Highway 369

Route information
- Maintained by Ministry of Highways and Infrastructure
- Length: 20.9 km (13.0 mi)

Major junctions
- South end: Highway 10 near the Manitoba border
- North end: Highway 5 / Highway 357 near Togo

Location
- Country: Canada
- Province: Saskatchewan
- Rural municipalities: Cote, Calder

Highway system
- Provincial highways in Saskatchewan
← Highway 368	→ Highway 371

Highway 369 is a provincial highway in the Canadian province of Saskatchewan. It runs from Highway 10 near the Manitoba border to Highway 5 and Highway 357 near Togo. It is about 21 kilometres (13 mi) long, all of which is an unpaved, two-lane, gravel highway.

The route was originally part of Highway 5, but became Highway 369 in the 1960s when Highway 5 was realigned to the Manitoba border east to Togo.

== Major intersections ==
From south to north:

Rural municipality	Location	km	mi	Destinations	Notes
Calder No. 241		0.0	0.0	Highway 10 – Roblin, Yorkton	Southern terminus; road continues south as Range Road 1302
Calder No. 241 / Cote No. 271 boundary		8.0– 8.2	5.0– 5.1	Bridge over the Lake of the Prairies / Assiniboine River	
Cote No. 271	Togo	20.5	12.7	Highway 357 to Highway 8 – Togo	
Cote No. 271		20.9	13.0	Highway 5 – Kamsack, Roblin	Northern terminus; road continues north as Range Road 1301
1.000 mi = 1.609 km; 1.000 km = 0.621 mi

== See also ==
- Transportation in Saskatchewan
- Roads in Saskatchewan
