= Duck Mountain Ski Area =

Ski area in Saskatchewan, Canada

Coordinates: 51.561°N 101.608°W

- Location within Saskatchewan Location within Canada
- Location: Duck Mountain Provincial Park, Saskatchewan, Canada
- Nearest city: Kamsack
- Vertical: 99 m (325 ft)
- Top elevation: 649 m (2,129 ft)
- Base elevation: 550 m (1,804 ft)
- Skiable area: 60 acres (0.2 km^{2})
- Trails: 21 25% - Easiest; 50% - More Difficult; 25% - Most Difficult
- Longest run: 1.5 km (1 mi)
- Lift system: 2 T-Bar Lifts & 1 Magic Carpet
- Snowfall: 0.9m (3ft)/year
- Website: Ski The Duck

Duck Mountain Ski Area is a ski area located in Saskatchewan's Duck Mountain Provincial Park approximately 2.5 kilometres (1.6 mi) from the Manitoba / Saskatchewan border. It is 36 kilometres (22 mi) from Kamsack and 116 kilometres (72 mi) from Yorkton. The Duck Mountains, the area where the hill is located, are a feature of the Manitoba Escarpment. Thunderhill Ski Area, 50 kilometres (31 mi) to the north is another ski hill located along the Manitoba Escarpment. The operating season for Duck Mountain Ski Area varies depending on weather and snow conditions, but the hill typically is open from late December to mid-March every year.

== History ==
Duck Mountain Ski Area was established in 1978. The ski hill is managed by a not-for-profit organization, with members from:

- Town of Kamsack
- RM of Cote No. 271
- Kamsack Ski Club
- Duck Mountain Provincial Park
- and members at large

== See also ==
- List of ski areas and resorts in Canada
- Tourism in Saskatchewan
