= Muskiki =

Muskiki is a word of Cree origin ("maskihkîy") meaning medicine, and may refer to:

- Muskiki Formation, a stratigraphical unit of Late Cretaceous age in the Western Canadian Sedimentary Basin
- Muskiki River, a tributary of the Nottaway River in Nord-du-Québec, Canada
- Muskiki Springs, a community in Saskatchewan, Canada
- Muskiki Creek (and Muskiki Lake), a tributary of the Cardinal River, Alberta, Canada
