= Runnymede, Saskatchewan =

Hamlet in Saskatchewan, Canada

Coordinates: 51°28′54″N 101°42′05″W

Runnymede is a hamlet in Saskatchewan, Canada. Located within the Rural Municipality of Cote No. 271 near the border with Manitoba, it lies along both Highway 5 and Canadian National Railway's Togo subdivision, lying roughly halfway between the town of Kamsack and the village of Togo.

== Demographics ==
In the 2021 Census of Population conducted by Statistics Canada, Runnymede had a population of 20 living in 9 of its 9 total private dwellings, a change of -33.3% from its 2016 population of 30. With a land area of 0.24 km^{2} (0.093 sq mi), it had a population density of 83.3/km^{2} (215.8/sq mi) in 2021.

== See also ==
- List of communities in Saskatchewan
