= Highway 57 (Saskatchewan–Manitoba) =

Pair of provincial highways in the Canadian provinces of Saskatchewan and Manitoba

Highway 57
- Highway 57 highlighted in red

Route information
- Length: 20.7 km (12.9 mi) SK: 19.2 km (11.9 mi); MB: 1.5 km (0.9 mi)

Major junctions
- West end: Highway 5 near Kamsack, SK
- SK-MB border near Madge Lake
- East end: PTH 83 in Duck Mountain Provincial Forest

Location
- Country: Canada

Highway system
- Provincial highways in Saskatchewan
- Provincial highways in Manitoba; Winnipeg City Routes
← Highway 56	→ Highway 58
← PTH 52	→ PTH 59

Highway 57 and Provincial Trunk Highway 57 (PTH 57) are two short highways in the Canadian provinces of Saskatchewan and Manitoba.

== Route description ==
Highway 57 runs from Highway 5 eight kilometres (5.0 mi) east of Kamsack to the Saskatchewan — Manitoba border near Madge Lake, where it transitions to PTH 57. After crossing the provincial boundary, the highway travels for a short distance within Duck Mountain Provincial Forest before ending at PTH 83.

The combined highway is about 20.7 kilometres (12.9 mi) in length, 19.2 kilometres (11.9 mi) of which is in Saskatchewan while 1.5 kilometres (0.9 mi) is in Manitoba.

Highway 57/PTH 57 is the main route through Duck Mountain Provincial Park. Kamsack Beach and Ministik Beach, located along Madge Lake, are accessible from the highway.

The speed limit is 100 km/h (62.5 mph) outside of Duck Mountain Provincial Park and 80 km/h (50 mph) within the park limits, dropping to 60 km/h (37 mph) from near the Kamsack Subdivision turnoff to after the Pickerel Point turnoff.

== Major intersections ==
From west to east:

Province	Rural Municipality	Location	km	mi	Destinations	Notes
Saskatchewan	St. Philips No. 301		0.0	0.0	Highway 5 – Togo, Kamsack, Saskatoon	Continues as Highway 5 west
Saskatchewan	St. Philips No. 301	Duck Mountain; Provincial Park	7.4– 19.2	4.6– 11.9	Passes through Duck Mountain Provincial Park	
Saskatchewan – Manitoba border			19.2 0.0	11.9 0.0	Provincial boundary	
Manitoba	Duck Mountain; Provincial Forest		1.5	0.93	PTH 83 – Swan River, Benito, Roblin	
1.000 mi = 1.609 km; 1.000 km = 0.621 mi

== See also ==
- Transportation in Saskatchewan
- Roads in Saskatchewan
- Department of Infrastructure (Manitoba)
