= Duck Mountain Provincial Park =

Duck Mountain Provincial Park may refer to

- Duck Mountain Provincial Park (Manitoba)
- Duck Mountain Provincial Park (Saskatchewan)
