= Smuts, Saskatchewan =

Smuts
- Unincorporated community
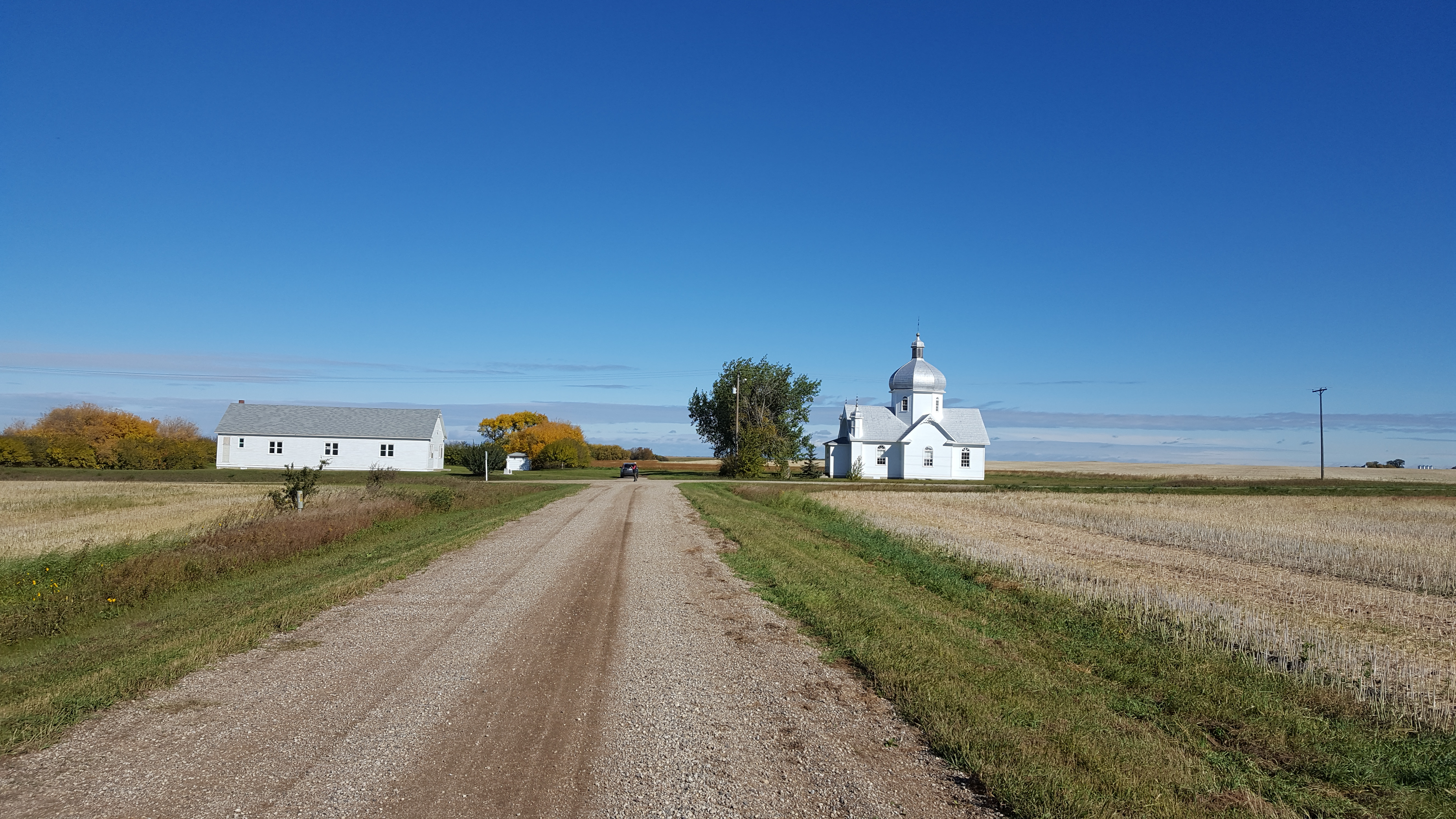
- Holy Trinity Ukrainian Greek Orthodox Church, Smuts

- Location within Saskatchewan
- Coordinates: 52°26′6″N 106°6′52″W
- Country: Canada
- Province: Saskatchewan
- Region: East Central
- Census division: 15
- Rural Municipality: Grant No. 372

Government
  - Governing body: Rural Municipality of Grant No. 372
- Time zone: UTC-6 (CST)
- Area code: 306
- Highways: Highway 41 Highway 767
- Railways: Canadian Pacific Railway

Smuts is an unincorporated community within the Rural Municipality of Grant No. 372, in the province of Saskatchewan, Canada. Smuts is located west of Highway 41 north of Vonda.

== See also ==
- List of communities in Saskatchewan
