= Rural Municipality of Cote No. 271 =

Rural municipality in Saskatchewan, Canada

Cote No. 271
- Rural municipality
- Rural Municipality of Cote No. 271
- Location of the RM of Cote No. 271 in Saskatchewan
- Coordinates: 51.513°N 101.822°W
- Country: Canada
- Province: Saskatchewan
- Census division: 9
- SARM division: 4
- Formed: December 12, 1910

Government
  - Reeve: Jim Tomochko
  - Governing body: RM of Cote No. 271 Council
  - Administrator: Sherry Guenther
  - Office location: Kamsack

Area (2016)
  - Land: 879.8 km^{2} (339.7 sq mi)

Population (2016)
  - Total: 548
  - Density: 0.6/km^{2} (1.6/sq mi)
- Time zone: CST
  - Summer (DST): CST
- Area codes: 306 and 639

The Rural Municipality of Cote No. 271 (2016 population: 548) is a rural municipality (RM) in the Canadian province of Saskatchewan within Census Division No. 9 and SARM Division No. 4.

== History ==
The RM of Cote No. 271 incorporated as a rural municipality on December 12, 1910.

== Geography ==
=== Communities and localities ===
The following urban municipalities are surrounded by the RM.

Towns

- Kamsack

Villages

- Togo

The following unincorporated communities are within the RM.

Organized hamlets

- Runnymede

Localities

- Cote
- Kamsack Beach
- Ministik Beach

== Demographics ==
Population history (1981–2016)
| Year | Pop. | ±% |
|---|---|---|
| 1981 | 821 | — |
| 1986 | 790 | −3.8% |
| 1991 | 760 | −3.8% |
| 1996 | 687 | −9.6% |
| 2001 | 664 | −3.3% |
| 2006 | 551 | −17.0% |
| 2011 | 580 | +5.3% |
| 2016 | 548 | −5.5% |
Source: Statistics Canada via Saskatchewan Bureau of Statistics

In the 2021 Census of Population conducted by Statistics Canada, the RM of Cote No. 271 had a population of 616 living in 288 of its 493 total private dwellings, a change of 12.4% from its 2016 population of 548. With a land area of 871.02 km^{2} (336.30 sq mi), it had a population density of 0.7/km^{2} (1.8/sq mi) in 2021.

In the 2016 Census of Population, the RM of Cote No. 271 recorded a population of 548 living in 245 of its 510 total private dwellings, a −5.5% change from its 2011 population of 580. With a land area of 879.8 km^{2} (339.7 sq mi), it had a population density of 0.6/km^{2} (1.6/sq mi) in 2016.

== Attractions ==
- Duck Mountain Provincial Park
- Shellmouth Reservoir
- Madge Lake
- Kamsack & District Museum

== Government ==
The RM of Cote No. 271 is governed by an elected municipal council and an appointed administrator that meets on the second Wednesday of every month. The reeve of the RM is Jim Tomochko while its administrator is Sherry Guenther. The RM's office is located in Kamsack.

== Transportation ==
- Saskatchewan Highway 5
- Saskatchewan Highway 8
- Saskatchewan Highway 57
- Saskatchewan Highway 357
- Saskatchewan Highway 369
- Canadian National Railway
- Kamsack Airport

== See also ==
- List of rural municipalities in Saskatchewan
