= St. Denis, Saskatchewan =

Community in Saskatchewan, Canada

St. Denis
- Unincorporated community
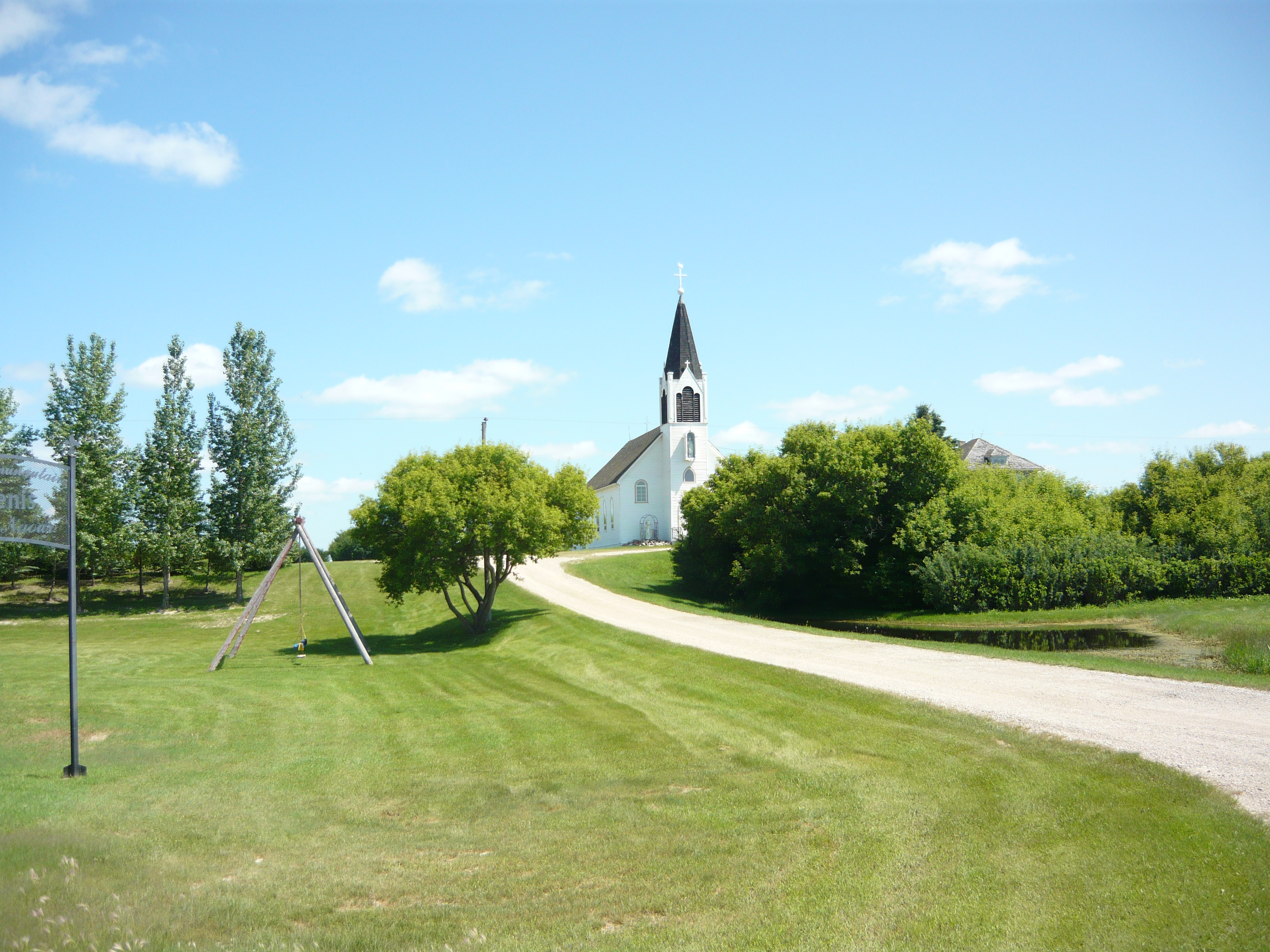
- St. Denis Roman Catholic Church

- Location within Saskatchewan Location within Canada
- Coordinates: 52°09′30″N 106°05′57″W
- Country: Canada
- Province: Saskatchewan
- Region: Central
- Census division: 15
- Rural municipality: Grant No. 372
- Post office Founded: 1909

Government
  - Governing body: Rural Municipality of Grant No. 372
- Time zone: UTC-6 (CST)
- Area code: 306
- Highways: Highway 5 Highway 671

St. Denis is an unincorporated community in the Rural Municipality of Grant No. 372, in the Canadian province of Saskatchewan. The community was founded in 1910. A post office was established at St. Denis in 1909 but it closed in 1911. Leon Denis was postmaster. The post office was located on the Leon Denis homestead at NE 24-37-R1 w 3rd meridian.

St. Denis maintains close cultural ties with the nearby communities of Prud'homme and Vonda. The three communities were originally settled by French speaking settlers in the early 1900s.

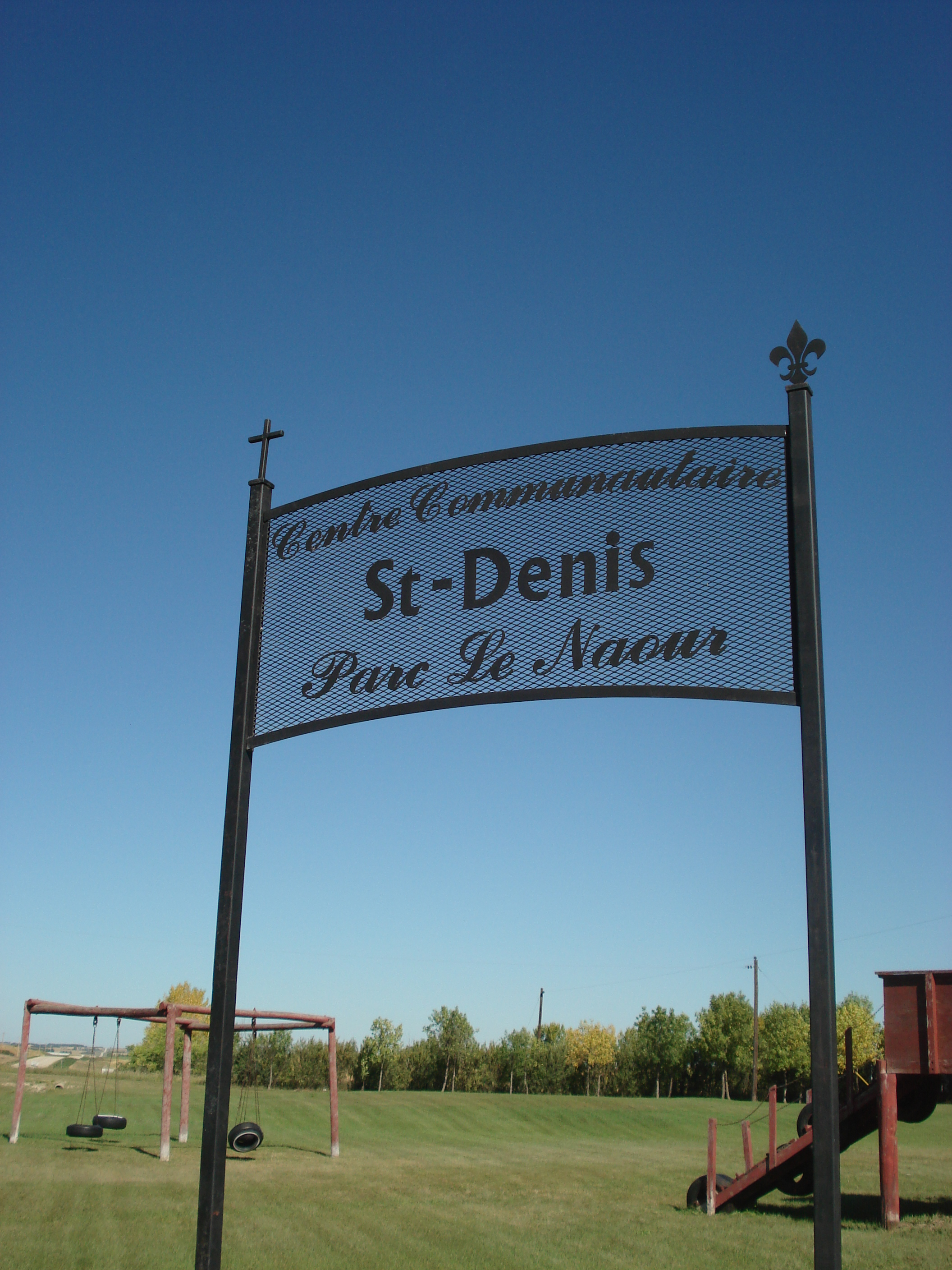
Park in St. Denis

== See also ==
- List of communities in Saskatchewan
