= Manitoba Provincial Road 363 =

Provincial road in Manitoba, Canada

Provincial Road 363
- PR 363 highlighted in red

Route information
- Maintained by Department of Infrastructure
- Length: 8.9 km (5.5 mi)
- Existed: 1966–present

Major junctions
- West end: Highway 5 at Saskatchewan border near Togo
- PR 484 near Makaroff
- East end: PTH 83 near San Clara

Location
- Country: Canada
- Province: Manitoba
- Rural municipalities: Roblin

Highway system
- Provincial highways in Manitoba; Winnipeg City Routes
← PR 362	→ PR 364

Provincial Road 363 (PR 363) is a short east–west highway in the Municipality of Roblin, Manitoba, Canada.

PR 363 starts at PTH 83 eleven kilometres (6.8 mi) south of San Clara and terminates at the Saskatchewan border just east of Togo, where it continues as Highway 5. PR 363 serves as a connector from PTH 83 to Highway 5, which is a major east–west highway within the province of Saskatchewan.

The length of PR 363 is about nine kilometres (5.6 mi).

== Major intersections ==
Division	Location	km	mi	Destinations	Notes
Roblin		0.0	0.0	Highway 5 west – Togo	Continuation into Saskatchewan; western terminus
Roblin		4.4	2.7	Bridge over Big Boggy Creek	
Roblin		5.6	3.5	PR 484 south – Makaroff	Northern terminus of PR 484
Roblin		8.9	5.5	PTH 83 – Swan River, Roblin	Eastern terminus; road continues east as Road 163N
1.000 mi = 1.609 km; 1.000 km = 0.621 mi
