= Clair, Saskatchewan =

Community in Saskatchewan, Canada

Clair
- Unincorporated community
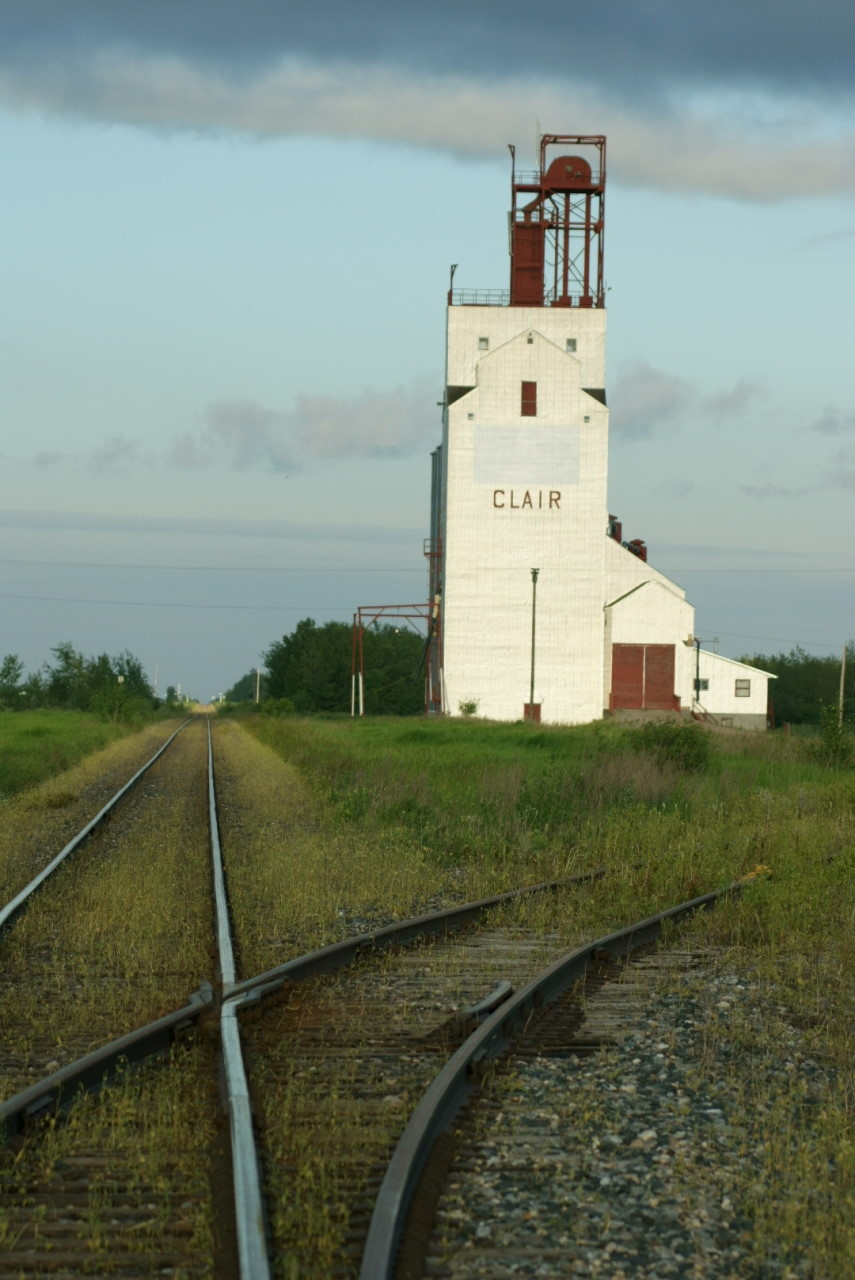

- Location in Saskatchewan Location in Canada
- Coordinates: 52°1′N 104°4′W
- Country: Canada
- Provinces and territories of Canada: Saskatchewan
- Census division: 10
- Rural municipality (RM): Lakeview No. 337
- Post Office founded: 1906-04-01

Government
  - Federal Electoral District MP: (2008)
  - Provincial Constituency of M.L.A.: (2007)

Population (2006)
  - Total: 25
  - Summer (DST): CST
- Area code: 306
- Highways: Highway 5
- Railways: CNR, CPR
- Waterways: Quill Lakes, Fishing Lake

Clair is a community in Saskatchewan, Canada, located north of the provincial capital city of Regina. It is also 116.26 miles (187.10 km) east of Saskatoon. Prince Albert is 132.68 miles (213.53 km) north-west of Clair and Yorkton is 101.93 miles (164.04 km) south-east of Clair. It is on Highway 5. Clair is located in the Saskatchewan prairies.

== History ==
Clair is a railroad town founded in the early 1900s. It was named after a train conductor's daughter. At one point Clair was home to 200 people, a general store, post office, and hotel as well as many small businesses.

Clair was also a grain hub in the 1900s up until the late 1990s when all the grain elevators in the area were either torn down or sold to private owners.

== Climate ==
Clair experiences dry and cold winters with temperatures reaching -40 degrees Celsius or colder, and summers with temperatures reaching 30 degrees Celsius or hotter.

Climate data for Clair (Clair, Saskatchewan, normals 1981–2010)
Month	Jan	Feb	Mar	Apr	May	Jun	Jul	Aug	Sep	Oct	Nov	Dec	Year
Record high humidex	5.9	7.6	19.2	30.6	36.0	42.7	43.9	42.0	38.7	30.0	18.6	10.7	43.9
Record high °C (°F)	10.0 (50.0)	12.8 (55.0)	22.8 (73.0)	33.3 (91.9)	37.2 (99.0)	40.6 (105.1)	40.0 (104.0)	38.6 (101.5)	35.3 (95.5)	32.2 (90.0)	21.7 (71.1)	14.4 (57.9)	40.6 (105.1)
Mean daily maximum °C (°F)	−10.1 (13.8)	−7.2 (19.0)	−0.3 (31.5)	11.2 (52.2)	18.2 (64.8)	22.4 (72.3)	25.3 (77.5)	24.9 (76.8)	18.3 (64.9)	10.2 (50.4)	−1.2 (29.8)	−8 (18)	8.6 (47.5)
Daily mean °C (°F)	−15.5 (4.1)	−12.5 (9.5)	−5.4 (22.3)	4.7 (40.5)	11.2 (52.2)	15.8 (60.4)	18.5 (65.3)	17.6 (63.7)	11.4 (52.5)	4.0 (39.2)	−6 (21)	−13.2 (8.2)	2.6 (36.7)
Mean daily minimum °C (°F)	−20.7 (−5.3)	−17.8 (0.0)	−10.5 (13.1)	−1.9 (28.6)	4.1 (39.4)	9.2 (48.6)	11.6 (52.9)	10.3 (50.5)	4.5 (40.1)	−2.3 (27.9)	−10.7 (12.7)	−18.3 (−0.9)	−3.5 (25.7)
Record low °C (°F)	−48.9 (−56.0)	−50 (−58)	−43.3 (−45.9)	−28.3 (−18.9)	−12.8 (9.0)	−3.3 (26.1)	−0.6 (30.9)	−2.8 (27.0)	−11.1 (12.0)	−25.6 (−14.1)	−39.4 (−38.9)	−43.9 (−47.0)	−50 (−58)
Record low wind chill	−60.9	−59.0	−50.1	−38.3	−16.2	−7.7	0.0	−4.8	−14.5	−33.4	−46.4	−57.6	−60.9
Average precipitation mm (inches)	14.8 (0.58)	8.8 (0.35)	15.6 (0.61)	22.7 (0.89)	43.0 (1.69)	65.8 (2.59)	60.3 (2.37)	42.6 (1.68)	35.4 (1.39)	18.8 (0.74)	13.0 (0.51)	12.9 (0.51)	353.7 (13.93)
Average rainfall mm (inches)	0.9 (0.04)	0.6 (0.02)	3.3 (0.13)	15.5 (0.61)	40.2 (1.58)	65.8 (2.59)	60.3 (2.37)	42.6 (1.68)	34.1 (1.34)	10.6 (0.42)	1.7 (0.07)	1.1 (0.04)	276.7 (10.89)
Average snowfall cm (inches)	17.5 (6.9)	10.2 (4.0)	14.6 (5.7)	8.0 (3.1)	2.3 (0.9)	0.0 (0.0)	0.0 (0.0)	0.0 (0.0)	1.2 (0.5)	8.3 (3.3)	13.4 (5.3)	15.9 (6.3)	91.3 (35.9)
Average precipitation days (≥ 0.2 mm)	10.3	7.1	8.2	8.3	9.5	12.1	11.2	9.4	8.4	7.4	8.0	9.7	109.7
Average rainy days (≥ 0.2 mm)	0.74	0.56	1.9	5.9	9.2	12.1	11.2	9.4	8.1	5.3	1.3	1.0	66.7
Average snowy days (≥ 0.2 cm)	11.7	8.4	8.0	3.7	0.78	0.0	0.0	0.0	0.56	3.0	8.5	10.9	55.4
Average relative humidity (%)	73.7	73.8	68.4	47.0	42.3	48.9	50.6	47.0	48.0	53.6	69.5	73.7	58.0
Mean monthly sunshine hours	106.2	131.1	173.1	222.0	263.0	266.8	308.8	269.6	192.5	157.0	91.3	86.5	2,267.8
Percentage possible sunshine	41.2	46.9	47.1	53.3	54.1	53.4	61.4	59.3	50.5	47.4	34.4	35.6	48.7
Source: Environment Canada

== Industry ==
Clair is located in the Saskatchewan prairies and has a huge industry in grain farming. Wheat, canola and oats are some of the most common types of grains grown in the area. Livestock farms are also present in the area around Clair. A major railway line runs parallel to Clair and carries grain and other materials across the Canadian prairies. Highway 5 also runs parallel to Clair. Highway 5 connects Clair with Saskatoon (largest city in Saskatchewan).

== Train crash ==
On October 7, 2014, A CN train hauling dangerous goods derailed. Three westbound locomotives heading to Saskatoon from Winnipeg were hauling 100 cars of mixed freight when 26 went off the tracks, six carrying dangerous goods. Provincial hazardous materials crews were dispatched to work with first responders already at the scene. Approximately 50 residences of Clair and surrounding farms were evacuated and Highway 5 was shut down. No one was hurt when the train crashed.

== See also ==
- List of communities in Saskatchewan
