= Benito Beach =

Community in Saskatchewan, Canada

Coordinates: 51.674589°N 101.607400°W

Location of Benito Beach in Saskatchewan

Benito Beach is an unincorporated community in Saskatchewan, Canada, on Madge Lake.

A road to connect Benito Beach to Kamsack Beach (at the south of the lake) was constructed in the late 1920s.

== See also ==
- List of communities in Saskatchewan
