= Dana, Saskatchewan =

Community in Saskatchewan, Canada

Dana
- Hamlet
- Location within Saskatchewan Location within Canada
- Coordinates: 52.289793°N 105.705342°W
- Country: Canada
- Province: Saskatchewan
- Region: Central
- Rural municipality: Bayne No. 371
- Post office: 1906-02-01 (closed 1970-05-29)
- Incorporated (Village): N/A
- Dissolved: April 1, 1926
- Time zone: CST
- Area code: 306

Dana is a hamlet in Saskatchewan, Canada, located at the intersection of Highway 637 and Highway 5. The hamlet is an un-incorporated place within the Rural Municipality of Bayne No. 371.

The hamlet at one point in time was closely associated with the CFS Dana, a nearby military installation that closed in 1987.

== See also ==
- List of communities in Saskatchewan
