= Paul de Margerie =

Canadian pianist

- Born: September 15, 1931; Vonda, Saskatchewan, Canada
- Died: April 13, 1968 (aged 36); Ottawa, Ontario, Canada
- Occupations: Pianist, Arranger, Composer

Paul de Margerie (15 September 1931 – 13 April 1968) was a Canadian pianist, arranger and composer.

== Biography ==
Paul de Margerie was born on 15 September 1931 in Vonda, Saskatchewan, Canada. He was Fransaskois.

He studied piano with Lyell Gustin at Saskatoon and then at the Royal Conservatory of Music at Toronto. At Université Laval, he won the Prix du gouvernement français and taught choral singing. He was at the head of the Chœur de l’Université Laval from 1955 to 1958.

He moved to Montreal in 1958 and was pianist for the group Les Bozos in autumn 1959. He was also accompanist to Charles Trenet and Catherine Sauvage in Canada, Europe and the United States. He was also responsible for the direction of concerts featuring Michel Legrand's music.

In 1960, de Margerie became arranger for the label Sélect. He then recorded his first album, which was popular with some of Quebec's best jazz musicians. He orchestrated the first recordings of Renée Claude, Pierre Létourneau, Raymond Lévesque, Clémence Desrochers, Robert Charlebois and Jean-Pierre Ferland. Working with Ferland, he composed "Ton visage", "Les enfants que j'aurai", "N'ouvre pas" and "J'amoure".

De Margerie was also accompanist or musical director of multiple Société Radio-Canada (SRC) shows, including Music-Hall, Chez Clémence, Le petit café and Visite aux chansonniers. His musical Hangar 54 was shown on SRC in 1967.

He won a trophy at the 1968 Festival du disque with Neil Chotem and Marcel Lévesque for his work as arranger and orchestra conductor for the instrumental album 3-12.

He died in Ottawa, Ontario, Canada on 13 April 1968. The song "Ton visage" that he composed for Jean-Pierre Ferland was inducted in the Canadian Songwriters Hall of Fame in 2007.

== Discography ==
Singles
Year	Title
1960	Du côté de la lune / Tarantelle di luna
1963	La Mucura / Trois poules vont au champs

Albums
Year	Title
1960	Paul de Margerie

== Filmography ==
Soundtrack
Year	Title
1965	The Merry World of Leopold Z
