= Vonda Rink =

Ice rink in Saskatchewan, Canada

Coordinates: 52.3224°N 106.0943°W

- Interactive map of the Vonda Rink area

General information
- Location: 304 5th St, Vonda, Saskatchewan, Canada

Technical details
- Floor count: 2

The Vonda Rink is a designated municipal historic property in Vonda, Saskatchewan, Canada. The rink is a former aircraft hangar that was purchased by the town from the Government of Canada at the end of the Second World War and in 1947 disassembled, moved and reassembled in its current location.

The hangar was originally built for the British Commonwealth Air Training Plan based in Davidson, Saskatchewan and used by the No. 23 Elementary Flight Training School. The building is now used as a community ice rink with a lobby and kitchen.
