= Thunderhill Ski Area =

Ski area in Manitoba, Canada

Coordinates: 52.0157°N 101.6084°W

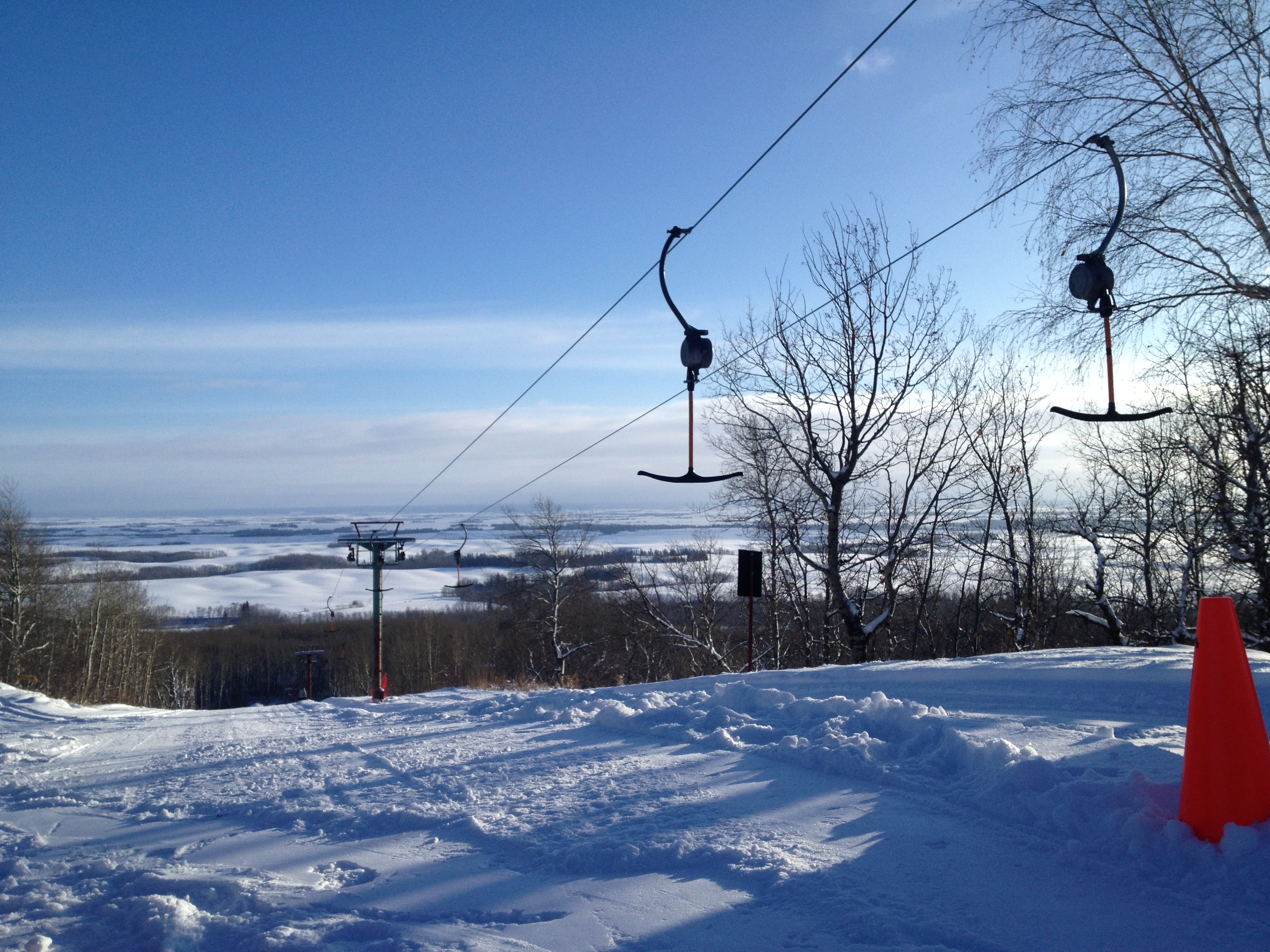
- The JB Construction Lift on the lower-mountain east portion of the hill.
- Interactive map of Thunderhill Ski Area
- Location: RM of Swan River, Manitoba; Canada
- Nearest city: Swan River
- Vertical: 137 m (449 ft)
- Top elevation: 573 m (1,880 ft)
- Base elevation: 436 m (1,430 ft)
- Skiable area: 60 acres (0.2 km^{2})
- Trails: 22 45% - Easiest; 32% - More Difficult; 23% - Most Difficult
- Longest run: 1.2 km (1 mi)
- Lift system: 2 T-Bar Lifts
- Terrain parks: 1 Terrain Park
- Snowfall: 1.4m (4.6ft)/year
- Website: Ski Thunderhill

Thunderhill Ski Area is a ski area located in the Swan River Valley region of Manitoba, Canada. It is approximately 25 kilometers southwest of the town of Swan River. The summit lies exactly on the Manitoba-Saskatchewan boundary. Its 137 metres (449 ft) vertical drop is currently the largest in Manitoba.

Thunderhill, on which the ski area is located, is a feature of the Manitoba Escarpment. The ski area has two sections - upper mountain west and lower mountain east. Each section is served by a T-Bar lift. The ski area's longest runs are about one kilometre, and are also some of the longest in the province. Typically, the area operates each winter from mid-December to mid-March.

== History ==
The ski area first opened in 1967 and was run by the Benito Elks club until 1972. The original lift used was a rope tow which also happened to be the longest lift of its kind in the province of Manitoba. In 1977, the Markosky Lift replaced the original rope tow, greatly increasing the accessibility of the hill. In 1990, the ski area was expanded further down the hill, creating two distinct areas. Upper-mountain west is the original ski area, and lower-mountain east is the newer area. Lower-mountain east was served by a rope-tow at that time. The areas are distinct in that some runs in each area are not accessible from the other area. However, some runs are continuous from upper-mountain-west to lower-mountain east. In 2012, an expanded portion of lower-mountain east was opened to the public, which included the new JB Construction lift (retractable t-Bar)to replace the rope tow and service the longer runs. Following this new lift a 2nd retractable t-bar was installed on the upper west side replacing the older fixed t-bar. The t-bars are each 1450 ft. with 450 vertical. Giving you access to 25 slopes. The longest run gives you 3.4 of a mile to enjoy nature at its best.

The ski lodge was originally an old country schoolhouse, and has been renovated and expand many times throughout the years. The most recent renovations were completed in 2002, which included new washrooms and a new ski rental room, as well as improvements to the building's exterior.

== Trails ==
Easy	Intermediate	Difficult
10	7	5

== Lifts ==
Lift Name	Length	Vertical	Type	Ride Time	Make	Build Year
Brandson Express	439m	54m	T-Bar lift	3 Mins	Doppelmayr	2016
JB Construction Lift	442m	55m	T-Bar Lift	3 mins	Doppelmayr	2012

Thunderhill's new T-Bar lifts are the focal points of an expansion project that has been taking place since 2011. They represent major improvements over the hill's former lift systems. The original Markowsky Lift was assembled at Thunderhill in 1977 and served the Upper-Mountain West area. Before that, it was in service at Mark Valley Ski Area (now closed). The aging lift was functional, but it was slow and mechanical problems often arose. The new lift, named the Brandson Express, was purchased from Vista Ridge All Seasons Park in Fort McMurray, Alberta. It was in storage in Roblin for several years, as wet conditions delayed its installation. In 2015, work began replacing the old T-bar, and the new lift was ready for use in the 2016-2017 season.

Before the most recent expansion project, the Lower-Mountain East area was served by a rope tow. The lift consisted of a large rope that riders simply hung onto as it pulled them up the hill (not to be confused with a handle tow, a similar more popular stye of lift). Some skiers and snowboarders found it difficult to use, as it required arm strength to hang on for the duration of the ride up the hill, and the heavy rope would also drag on the ground in the mid-section of the lift, carving grooves into the snow that were easy to trip over. To help alleviate these problems, the rope tow was split into two segments and riders had to release the rope at a mid station about two-thirds of the way to the top, where they had the option of continuing up the next section, or exiting onto the ski runs. The rope ran very fast, so it was also hard on mitts. Given these problems, the Lower-Mountain East area of the ski hill was under-utilized. The rope tow was removed in 2011 to make way for the JB Construction Lift. The JB Construction Lift was purchased from Snow Valley Ski Club in Edmonton, Alberta. It serves a larger area than the original rope tow and first operated during the 2012-2013 season.

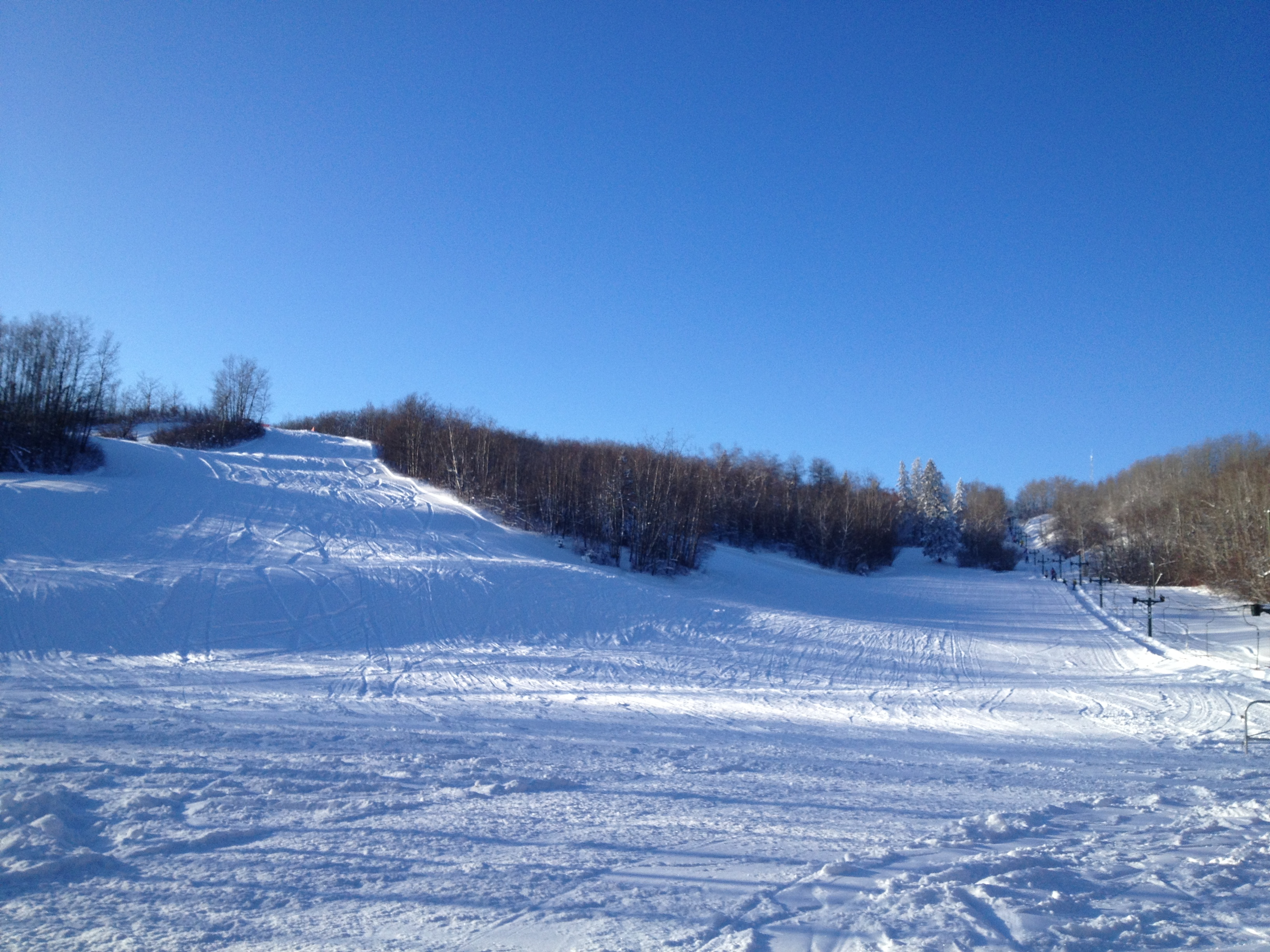
The base of upper-mountain west, prior to replacement of the Markowski Lift

== Other activities ==
=== Winter ===
Thunderhill Ski Area is connected to the Swan Valley's regional snowmobile trail system, and the ski lodge is frequently used by snowmobilers as a warm-up and rest stop. The area also has a number of ungroomed cross-country ski trails. In addition, the ski club provides tours and sleigh rides at certain times.

=== Summer ===
The hill has numerous mountain biking trails, and is used by Tread The Thunder Bike Club. In 2016, the bike club made improvements to the trail systems. There are now six sponsored trails and a large trailhead sign. Thunderhill was the site of the cycling competitions in the 2012 Manitoba Summer Games. The hill also attracts hikers, geocachers, and photographers, who take advantage of the natural setting and views of the Swan Valley.

== See also ==
- List of ski areas and resorts in Canada
- Duck Mountain Ski Area, a nearby ski area also located on the Manitoba Escarpment
