= CFS Dana =

Military radar station in Saskatchewan, Canada

Canadian Forces Station Dana (CFS Dana) was a military radar station 35 miles east of Saskatoon, Saskatchewan, in the Rural Municipality of Bayne No. 371.

RCAF Station Dana (also known as Sagehill) was opened in 1962 as part of the Pinetree Line of NORAD radar stations. The station was later renamed CFS Dana when the military branches were merged. The station was part of 45 Radar Squadron. The station was disbanded in 1987.

The station consisted of three pulsed radars, and support facilities, including barracks, married quarters (trailers), a school, chapel, bowling alley and gym. The site was powered by a natural gas-fired power plant, that also generated steam for heating some of the buildings.

== Disbandment ==
In 1988, the station was closed with the decommissioning of the Pinetree Line. The Sagehill Development Corporation bought the site in the late 1980s for $180,000. For some time, the PMQs (trailers) were rented out to civilians, but they are no longer there. For a time in the early 1990s, a company was producing soups and other foodstuffs there, but they ceased operations within a few years. In the mid to late 1990s, the base was sold to a farmer. As of 2011, the buildings are in disrepair, with roofs collapsing on some of them. Only one radar tower remains and its radome has been deflated. The owner recently died and current ownership is unknown, but it was used as a buffalo ranch as of 2021.

== Sage Hill Writing Experience ==
The Sage Hill Writing Experience started using the former camp and town-site to hold an annual writing school in 1990; though the school moved to other venues after 1993 it continued to use the Sage Hill name.

== See also ==
- Dana, Saskatchewan
