= Bremen, Saskatchewan =

Bremen
- Unincorporated community
- Location within Saskatchewan
- Coordinates: 52.376389°N 105.698333°W
- Country: Canada
- Province: Saskatchewan
- Region: Saskatchewan
- Rural Municipality: Bayne No. 371
- Post office: 1913-12-01 (closed 1970-05-29)
- Incorporated (Village): N/A
- Incorporated (Town): N/A
- Time zone: CST
- Area code: 306

Bremen is an unincorporated community in Saskatchewan.
