= Muskiki Springs =

Community in Saskatchewan, Canada

- Ghost town
- Location within Saskatchewan Location within Canada
- Coordinates: 52.316667°N 105.700556°W
- Country: Canada
- Province: Saskatchewan
- Region: Saskatchewan
- Rural Municipality: Bayne No. 371
- Incorporated (Village): N/A
- Incorporated (Town): N/A
- Time zone: CST
- Area code: 306

Muskiki Springs was a community in Saskatchewan, Canada. It is on the south-eastern shore of Muskiki Lake.

== See also ==
- List of communities in Saskatchewan
