= Madge Lake =

Lake in Saskatchewan, Canada

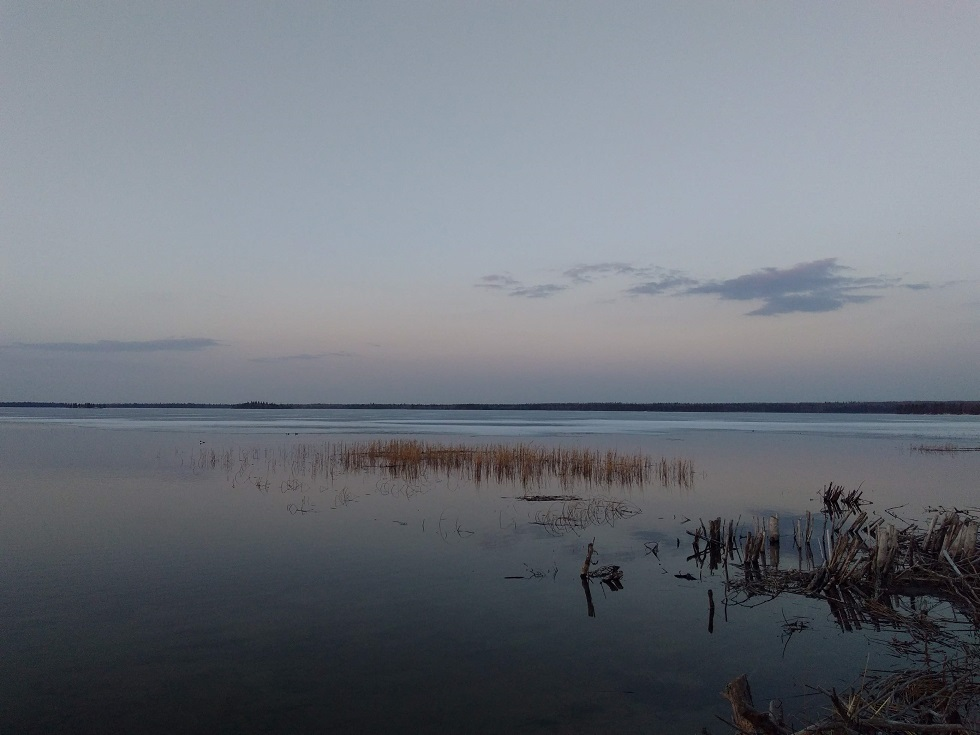
- Madge Lake

- Location in Saskatchewan Madge Lake (Canada)
- Location: Duck Mountain Provincial Park, Saskatchewan
- Coordinates: 51°40′N 101°38′W
- Part of: Nelson River drainage basin
- River sources: Duck Mountain
- Basin countries: Canada
- Max. length: 5 km (3.1 mi)
- Max. width: 5 km (3.1 mi)
- Surface area: 1,730 ha (4,300 acres)
- Average depth: 4 m (13 ft), with three basins, partially separated by an extensive shallow area (<1 m) west of the lake centre
- Max. depth: 14.5 m (48 ft)
- Shore length^{1}: 40.3 km (25.0 mi)
- Surface elevation: 612 m (2,008 ft)
- Islands: Miles Island; Spruce Island; Ski Island; Hurricane Island; Roy Island
- Settlements: Kamsack Beach; Benito Beach
- ^{1} Shore length is not a well-defined measure.

Madge Lake is a freshwater lake in eastern Saskatchewan, Canada. It is the largest body of water in, and the feature attraction of, Saskatchewan's Duck Mountain Provincial Park. The lake is within the Duck Mountains of the Manitoba Escarpment, about 18 kilometres (11 mi) east of the town of Kamsack and just a few kilometres west of the province's eastern boundary. Road access is via Highway 57, which passes by the southern shore of the lake.

Madge Lake is surrounded by boreal forest and is within the protected Duck Mountain Provincial Forest. Due to having a relatively small catchment, and sitting atop the Duck Mountains, the lake is susceptible to significant fluctuations in water levels.

== Recreational opportunities ==
Madge Lake serves as Duck Mountain Provincial Park's central tourist attraction. Seasonal recreational activities in and around the lake include: fishing, hiking, bicycling, swimming, boating, water skiing, snowmobile riding, horseback riding, tobagganing, miniature golf, and 18-hole golf. The area also provides abundant wildlife viewing opportunities, especially in the immensely large local breeding flock of ducks and other waterfowl. A large campground and rental cabins are near its shores. Over 300 private vacation residences can also be found around the lake, mostly in the communities of Kamsack Beach and Benito Beach. There are two public swimming beaches (Ministik and Pickerel Point Beaches) constructed with artificially supplied sand.

== Climate ==
The climate of eastern Saskatchewan features extreme seasonal variation, with winter temperatures below −30 °C and summer temperatures above +30 °C not uncommon. The lake therefore has very distinct seasons. It is ice covered in winter, usually from mid-November to mid-April. And the ice is thick enough to walk on, snowmobile on, and even drive vehicles on, from mid-December to early March. Approximately 80 centimetres (31 in) of snow accumulates in the area through the winter, slowly building depth until it begins to actively melt in spring, usually from March through to April. The lake itself is however usually not completely clear of ice until early May.

== Environmental concerns ==
Of concern is the lake's fluctuating water level, which had dropped by more than a metre between the early 1960s and the late 1970s. The lake, being located on a rise of land, has a very small catchment area and so its level is very susceptible to variations in annual rainfall. The lake is also relatively shallow with a largely flat bottom, making even a small change in water level noticeable at the lakeshore. An outlet stream draining the lake to the north ceased flowing in the early 1970s, increasing concerns of eutrophication and stagnation of the lake water. However, the lake had by the late 1990s risen again by some 60 cm from its lowest levels of the late 1970s. While welcome, this rise drowned many young trees along the water edge, particularly on the north shore which became clothed in dead saplings. Emergent marsh plants (notably Schoenoplectus, Typha, and Phragmites) had also overtaken much shore line with the resubmergence of formerly dry lake bottom. The water level dropped again during the very dry year of 2000, but has since risen again, and had reached very high levels following the very wet summer of 2010 and snowy winter of 2010–11 (about 200 cm above its lowest level in 1975). Some recreational facilities, such as the boat launch facility on the lake's north-east corner, have been rendered inaccessible by the high water levels, and very little visible beach sand remains at the Pickerel Point or Ministik swimming areas.

The variable water level has also caused other recent changes to the lake. At the time of lowest water level in the late 1970s, the lake's largest island, Spruce Island, was connected by dry land to the mainland, and a large gravel bar in the lake's north basin was exposed. Now, however, the land corridor to Spruce Island is resubmerged, and Spruce Island is once again an island. The once-exposed gravel bar has similarly been resubmerged, becoming a hazard to boating and unfortunately extirpating the colony of common terns and herring gulls that bred there. These two species are no longer commonly seen on the lake now that their breeding site has drowned, but the recent rise in water level is to the apparent benefit of the lake's common loon, red-necked grebe, and beaver populations. Ducks are also thriving in the stretches of now-flooded shoreline. And fish catches have improved markedly since the low water days of the late 1970s.

== Hydrology ==
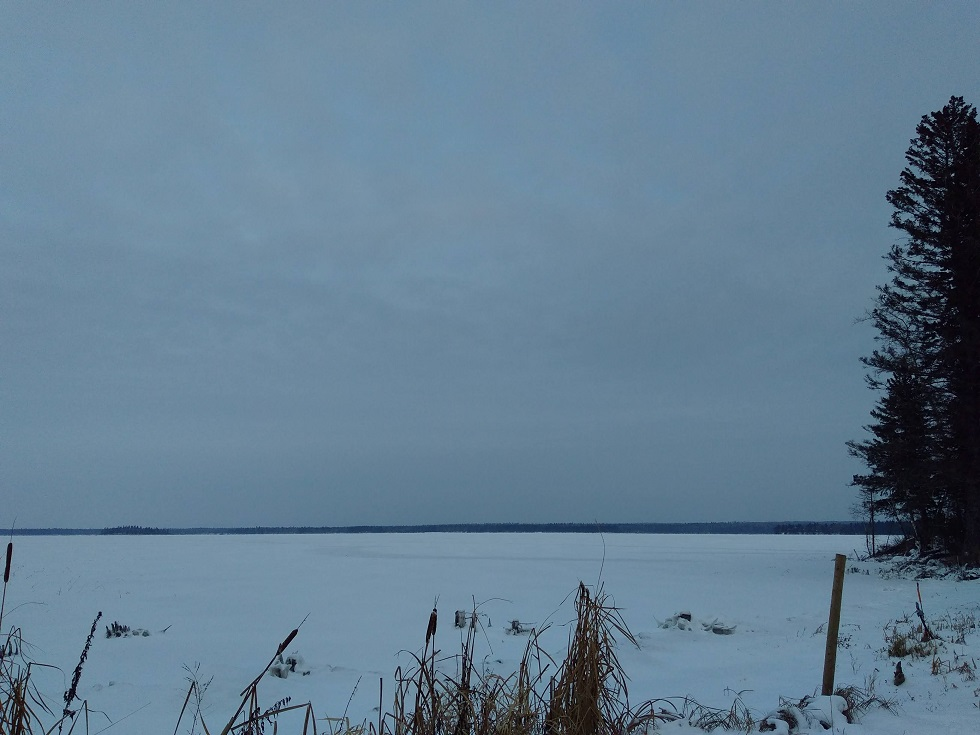
Madge Lake in the winter

Madge Lake's hydrology remains fairly isolated even at its current water level. Water level control structures at the creek outlet provides some control over the lake's water level. Lake water eventually enters Bear Head Lake at the north-eastern corner of Duck Mountain Provincial Park. Bear Head Lake is then in turn drained by Bear Head Creek, which continues north-east, crossing the Manitoba boundary, to join the Swan River on its journey to Swan Lake. Madge Lake is therefore part of the Swan River drainage basin.

The lake water is only very slightly eutrophic (and so can be described as mesotrophic), and is also moderately hard and alkaline, with a limestone-buffered pH of about 8.2. The water clarity in summer is limited by phytoplankton growth and wave-agitation of the calcareous clay bottom. A Secchi disk depth of as little as 1 metre is not uncommon after windy days. Water quality, however, is still considered to be good, and in fact, among the best in Saskatchewan's parks.

== Surrounding forest ==
The forest immediately surrounding the lake was last burned over in the mid 1800s, and so is now well over 100 years old and approaching climax. White spruce and balsam fir are now the dominant tree species on the shores of the lake. The lakeshore population of paper birch and trembling aspen is in decline, and deciduous trees are now fairly inconspicuous except in isolated pockets. This is a fairly recent development, as the deciduous trees that sprouted after the fires only started dying off in numbers in the 1980s. Before this time, the lake shore forest was dominated by deciduous trees. Therefore, for much of the 20th century, Spruce Island (which had escaped the fires) had a conspicuous evergreen forest in contrast to the younger deciduous forest of the surrounding shore, and thus the island received its name. However, the aging of the lakeshore forest means Spruce Island's forest is no longer visually distinctive. The forest is in a protected area called Duck Mountain Provincial Forest.

== Fish species ==
Fish commonly found in Madge Lake include walleye, yellow perch, northern pike, burbot, and white sucker. The lake was last stocked with 400,000 walleye fry in 2023.

== See also ==
- List of lakes of Saskatchewan
- Tourism in Saskatchewan
