= Mikado, Saskatchewan =

Hamlet in Saskatchewan, Canada

Coordinates: 51°36′31″N 102°16′14″W

Mikado is named after the ancient title of the Emperor of Japan. It is a hamlet in Saskatchewan, Canada. The hamlet is part of the Rural Municipality of Sliding Hills No. 273. It has a flag stop for Via Rail's Winnipeg–Churchill train.

Mikado is located at the intersection of Highway 5 and Highway 754.

This village was founded after Japan had won several victories against the Russian Empire in the Russo-Japanese War (1904–1905). Britain was allied with Japan in this war and Japan has a degree of newfound popularity in the British Empire. Three towns in Saskatchewan along the CN line (Togo, Kuroki, Mikado), a regional park (Oyama), and CN Siding (Fukushiama) were named in honour of Japanese achievements in this war.

== Demographics ==
In the 2021 Census of Population conducted by Statistics Canada, Mikado had a population of 40 living in 17 of its 19 total private dwellings, a change of 60% from its 2016 population of 25. With a land area of 0.41 km^{2} (0.16 sq mi), it had a population density of 97.6/km^{2} (252.7/sq mi) in 2021.

== See also ==
- List of communities in Saskatchewan
