= Rural Municipality of Grant No. 372 =

Rural municipality in Saskatchewan, Canada

Grant No. 372
- Rural municipality
- Rural Municipality of Grant No. 372
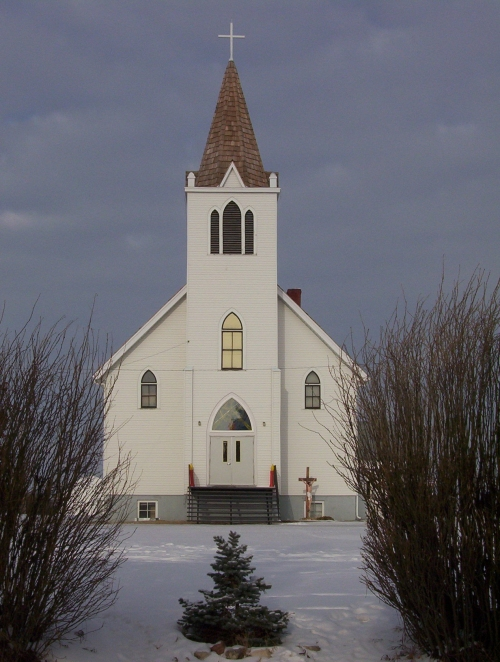
- Vonda, St. Philippe Neri Roman Catholic Church

- Location of the RM of Grant No. 372 in Saskatchewan
- Coordinates: 52.323°N 106.008°W
- Country: Canada
- Province: Saskatchewan
- Census division: 15
- SARM division: 5
- Formed: December 13, 1909

Government
  - Reeve: Travis Hryniuk
  - Governing body: RM of Grant No. 372 Council
  - Administrator: Brenda Skakun
  - Office location: Vonda

Area (2016)
  - Land: 666.16 km^{2} (257.21 sq mi)

Population (2016)
  - Total: 466
  - Density: 0.7/km^{2} (1.8/sq mi)
- Time zone: CST
  - Summer (DST): CST
- Area codes: 306 and 639

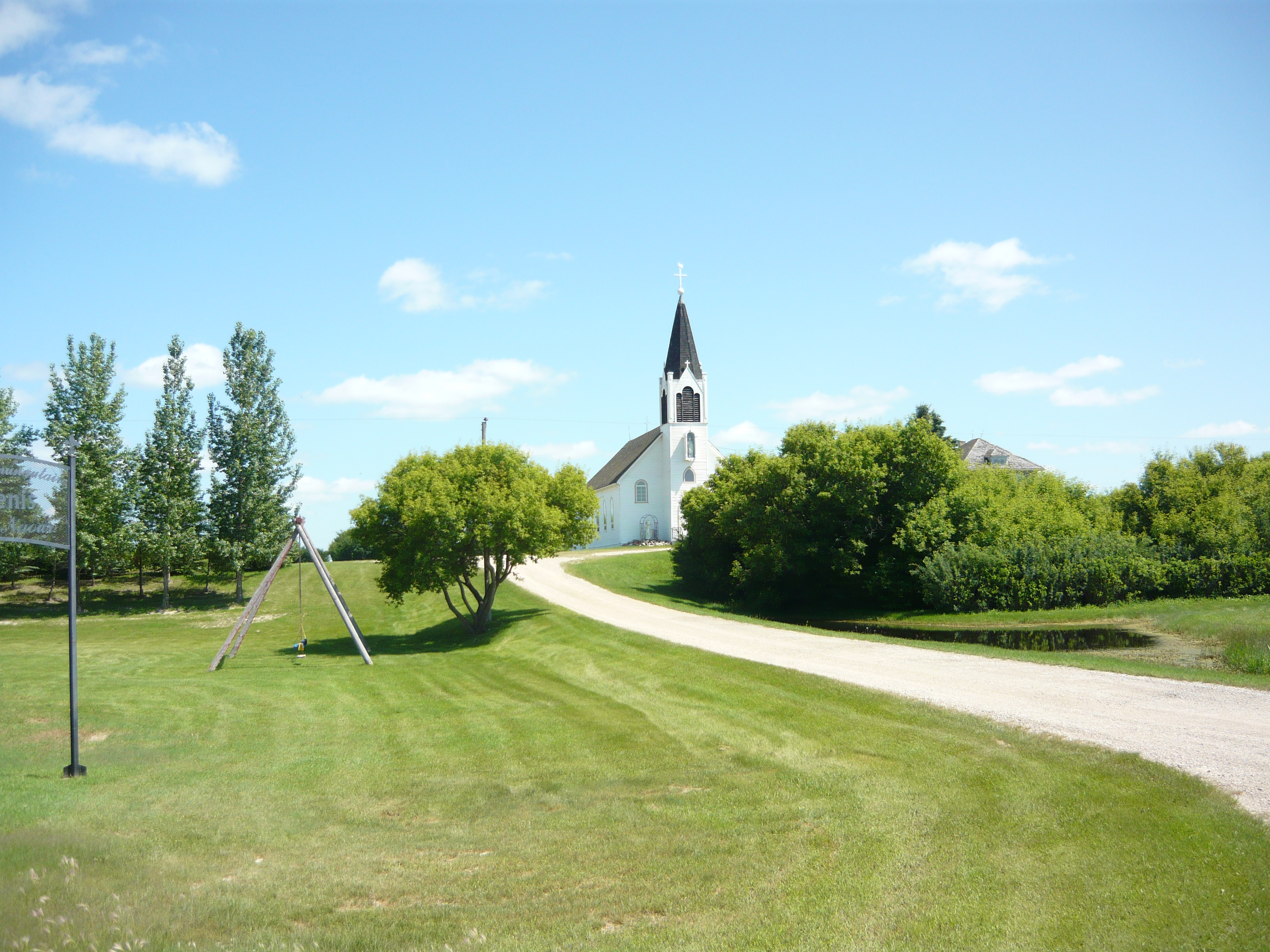
St. Denis, Roman Catholic Church

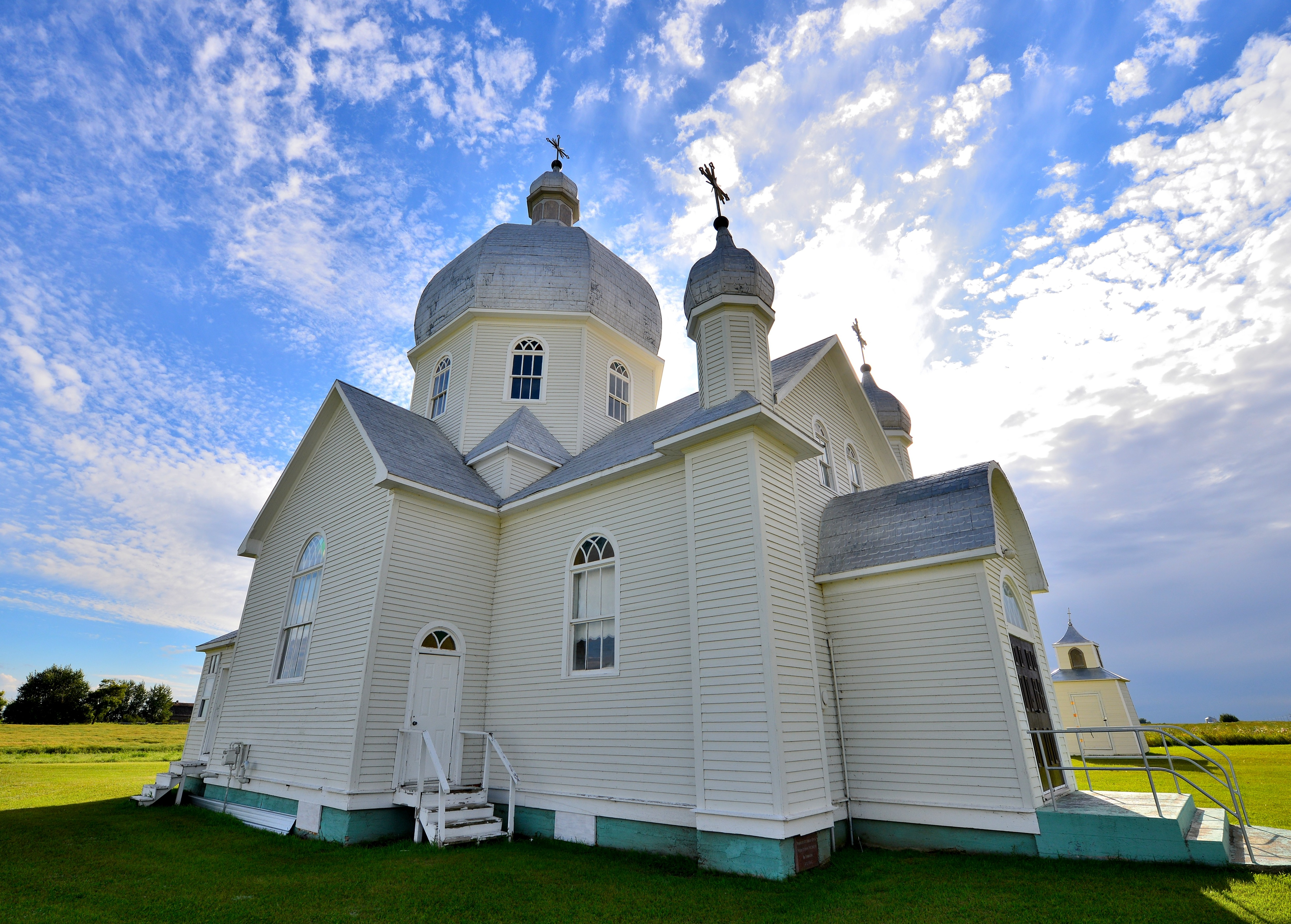
St. John the Baptist Ukrainian Greek Catholic Church

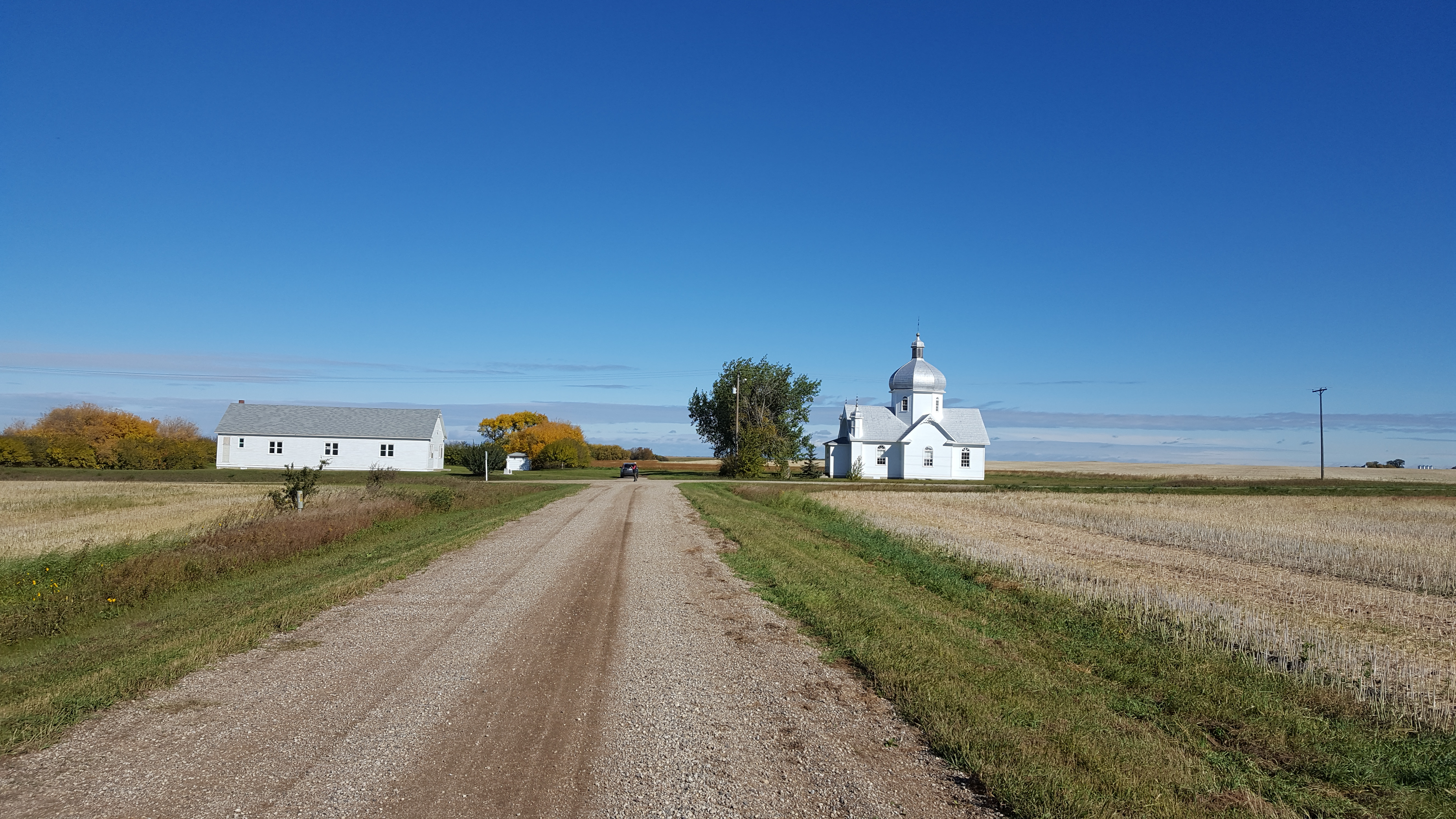
Smuts, Holy Trinity Ukrainian Greek Orthodox Church

The Rural Municipality of Grant No. 372 (2016 population: 466) is a rural municipality (RM) in the Canadian province of Saskatchewan within Census Division No. 15 and SARM Division No. 5. The RM's office is located in Vonda.

== History ==
The RM of Grant No. 372 incorporated as a rural municipality on December 13, 1909.

Heritage properties

There are four designated heritage buildings located within the RM. These properties include:

- Holy Trinity Ukrainian Greek Orthodox Church - Constructed in 1924, the church was built by Theodore Yanow and continues to be used as a church.
- Robert and Adele Schmidt's Double Hip Red Barn - Constructed in 1917.
- Ss. Peter and Paul Ukrainian Catholic Church (Bodnari Church) - Constructed in 1936, eight kilometers east from the Village of Smuts, the church was constructed by immigrants from the Borschiv region of Ukraine.
- St. John the Baptist Ukrainian Greek Catholic Church - Constructed near Smuts in 1926, the church was constructed by immigrants from the Borshchiv and Morodenka regions of Ukraine.

== Geography ==
=== Communities and localities ===
The following urban municipalities are surrounded by the RM.

Towns

- Vonda

The following unincorporated communities are within the RM.

Localities

- St. Denis
- Smuts

== Demographics ==
Population history (1981–2016)
Year	Pop.	±%
1981	621	—
1986	590	−5.0%
1991	560	−5.1%
1996	490	−12.5%
2001	468	−4.5%
2006	406	−13.2%
2011	425	+4.7%
2016	466	+9.6%
Source: Statistics Canada via Saskatchewan Bureau of Statistics

In the 2021 Census of Population conducted by Statistics Canada, the RM of Grant No. 372 had a population of 525 living in 190 of its 215 total private dwellings, a change of 12.7% from its 2016 population of 466. With a land area of 659.69 km^{2} (254.71 sq mi), it had a population density of 0.8/km^{2} (2.1/sq mi) in 2021.

In the 2016 Census of Population, the RM of Grant No. 372 recorded a population of 466 living in 168 of its 187 total private dwellings, a 9.6% change from its 2011 population of 425. With a land area of 666.16 km^{2} (257.21 sq mi), it had a population density of 0.7/km^{2} (1.8/sq mi) in 2016.

== Government ==
The RM of Grant No. 372 is governed by an elected municipal council and an appointed administrator that meets on the third Tuesday of every month. The reeve of the RM is Travis Hryniuk while its administrator is Brenda Skakun. The RM's office is located in Vonda.
