= Duck Mountain Provincial Park (Saskatchewan) =

Provincial park in Saskatchewan, Canada

- IUCN category II (national park)
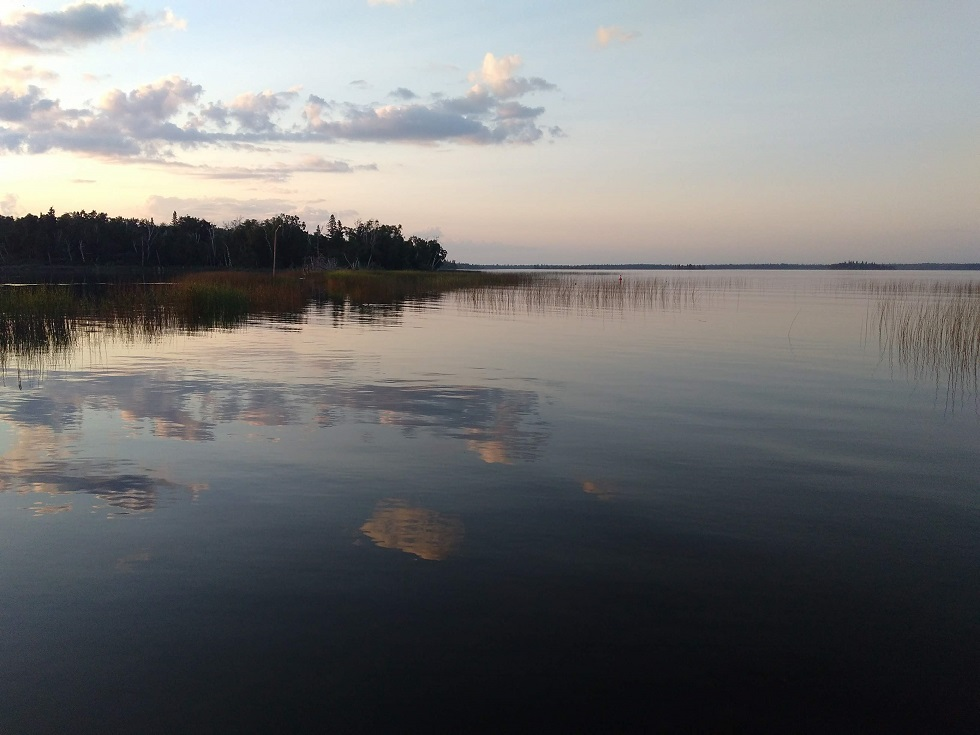
- Madge Lake

- Location within Saskatchewan Location within Canada
- Interactive map of Duck Mountain Provincial Park
- Location: RM of Cote No. 271 & RM of St. Philips No. 301, Saskatchewan, Canada
- Nearest town: Kamsack
- Coordinates: 51°41′N 101°38′W
- Area: 150 km^{2} (58 sq mi)
- Established: 1931
- Governing body: Sask Parks
- Website: website

Duck Mountain Provincial Park is a provincial park, located in the Canadian province of Saskatchewan 14 kilometres (8.7 mi) east of the town of Kamsack and stretches about 12 kilometres (7.5 mi) eastward to the Saskatchewan / Manitoba boundary. The park covers approximately 150 km^{2} (58 sq mi). Road access to the park is via Highway 57, which connects Saskatchewan Highway 5 to Manitoba Highway 83.

Duck Mountain is a feature of the Manitoba Escarpment, and is a rise of forested land between the Saskatchewan prairie and the Manitoba lowlands. It is about 200 m (660 ft) higher than the floor of the Assiniboine River valley to the west, and about 400 m (1,300 ft) higher than the Manitoba lowlands to the east. The landscape is rolling, with numerous ponds and creek channels. The soils are stony and are underlain with glacial till.

The area represents the southern limit of the boreal forest, in its transition zone to aspen parkland. The forest trees include white spruce, black spruce, tamarack larch, trembling aspen, balsam poplar, and paper birch. The park also has a fair number of balsam fir, even though it is at the extreme western limit of the natural range of that species. The flatter land areas surrounding the park have almost entirely been converted to cereal grain farmland, making the park (and the contiguous Manitoba Duck Mountain Provincial Forest) an environmental refuge for such large animals as elk, moose, black bear, lynx, bobcat, and timber wolf. Other animals, such as white-tailed deer and coyote, are also found in abundance in the forest, but roam more freely into the surrounding agricultural lands and are thus less reliant on the park. Fish species include walleye, yellow perch, northern pike, burbot, and white sucker.

== Attractions and amenities ==
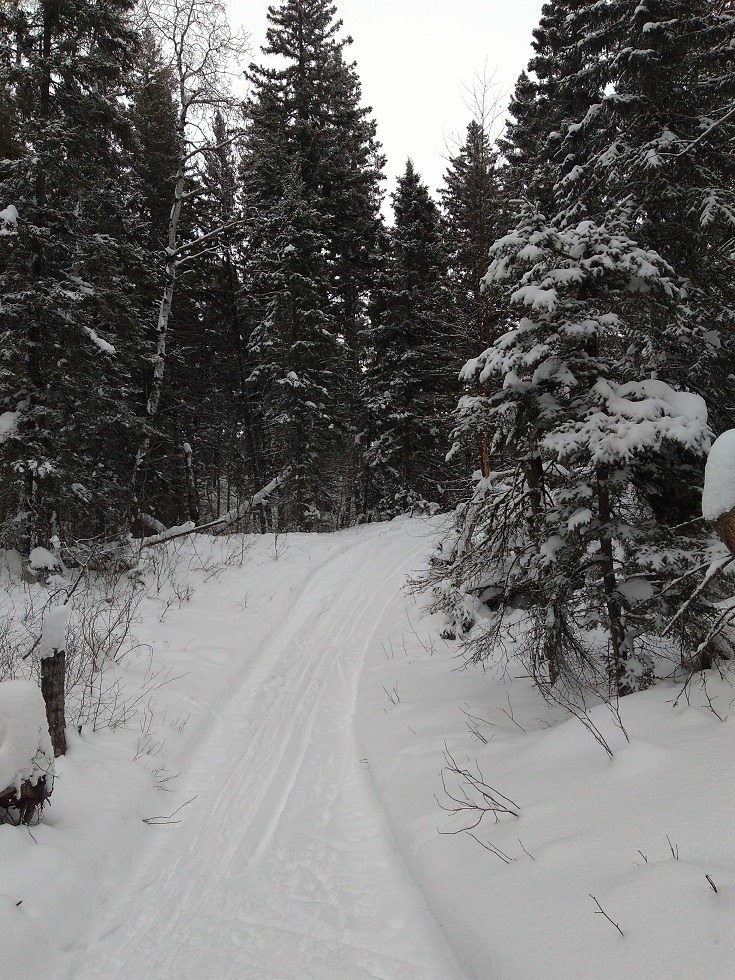
Ski trails at Duck Mountain

Madge Lake is the largest body of water in the park and serves as its central tourist attraction. Seasonal recreational activities in and around the lake include fishing, hunting, hiking (part of the Trans Canada Trail runs through the park), bicycling, swimming, boating, water skiing, downhill skiing, cross country skiing, snowmobile riding, horseback riding, tobagganing, miniature golf, and 18-hole golf. The area also provides abundant wildlife viewing opportunities, especially in the immensely large local breeding flock of ducks and other waterfowl.

There are multiple campgrounds throughout the park that have varying levels of services, including electrical hook-ups, potable water, laundry, sani-dumps, washrooms, and showers. Moose, Elk and Deer Campgrounds are group camping sites. Fern, Sellwood, Poplar, Spruce, and Birch A, B, & C Campgrounds are set up with individual sites. Most of the individual sites can accommodate larger vehicles, such as RVs and trailers. The Spruce Campground is right on Madge Lake. The group sites have camp kitchens and covered areas.

Duck Mountain Lodge operates as a year-round resort hotel in the park, and a large (summer) seasonal campground and rental cabins are also in the park. Over 300 private vacation residences (cottages) can also be found around the lake. There are two public swimming beaches (Ministik Beach and Pickerel Point Beach) constructed with artificially supplied sand.

At the Ministik Beach, Sask Aquatic Adventures has a water adventure park set up. It is one of several in Saskatchewan.

Madge Lake Golf Resort is an 18-hole, 5522-yard golf course located at the park on the south side of Highway 57, near Ministik Beach.

Duck Mountain Ski Area is located along the southern edge of the park. It was established in 1978 as a not-for-profit organization.

== See also ==
- List of protected areas of Saskatchewan
- Tourism in Saskatchewan
