= Rural Municipality of Bayne No. 371 =

Rural municipality in Saskatchewan, Canada

Bayne No. 371
- Rural municipality
- Rural Municipality of Bayne No. 371
- Location of the RM of Bayne No. 371 in Saskatchewan
- Coordinates: 52.281°N 105.652°W
- Country: Canada
- Province: Saskatchewan
- Census division: 15
- SARM division: 5
- Formed: December 12, 1910

Government
  - Reeve: Michael Kane
  - Governing body: RM of Bayne No. 371 Council
  - Administrator: Diana Koenning
  - Office location: Bruno

Area (2016)
  - Land: 802.93 km^{2} (310.01 sq mi)

Population (2016)
  - Total: 467
  - Density: 0.6/km^{2} (1.6/sq mi)
- Time zone: CST
  - Summer (DST): CST
- Area codes: 306 and 639

The Rural Municipality of Bayne No. 371 (2016 population: 467) is a rural municipality (RM) in the Canadian province of Saskatchewan within Census Division No. 15 and SARM Division No. 5. It is located in the north-central portion of the province.

== History ==
The RM of Bayne No. 371 incorporated as a rural municipality on December 12, 1910. It was named after Deputy Minister, J. N. Bayne. Canadian Forces Station Dana was an NORAD Pinetree Line radar installation located within the RM until it was disbanded in 1987.

Heritage properties

There are two historical properties within the RM.

- Sacred Heart Ukrainian Catholic Church - Constructed in 1927, on land donated by a local immigrant farmer (Nicholas Hawryluke). The property was recognized as a Municipal Heritage Property on May 13, 1999.
- St. Laszlo Canadian Magyar Hall - Constructed between 1903 and 1911, the church was established by Hungarian settlers to provide a place of worship. The hall is named after St. Laszlo. the hall is located 6.5 km northeast of Prud'homme, Saskatchewan.

== Geography ==
=== Communities and localities ===
The following unincorporated communities are within the RM.

Localities

- Bremen
- Dana
- Muskiki Springs
- Peterson
- Sagehill

== Demographics ==
Population history (1981–2016)
Year	Pop.	±%
1981	1,221	—
1986	1,089	−10.8%
1991	698	−35.9%
1996	615	−11.9%
2001	584	−5.0%
2006	505	−13.5%
2011	493	−2.4%
2016	467	−5.3%
2021	461	−1.3%
Source: Statistics Canada via Saskatchewan Bureau of Statistics

In the 2021 Census of Population conducted by Statistics Canada, the RM of Bayne No. 371 had a population of 461 living in 180 of its 202 total private dwellings, a change of −1.3% from its 2016 population of 467. With a land area of 788.95 km^{2} (304.62 sq mi), it had a population density of 0.6/km^{2} (1.5/sq mi) in 2021.

In the 2016 Census of Population, the RM of Bayne No. 371 recorded a population of 467 living in 189 of its 206 total private dwellings, a −5.3% change from its 2011 population of 493. With a land area of 802.93 km^{2} (310.01 sq mi), it had a population density of 0.6/km^{2} (1.5/sq mi) in 2016.

== Government ==
The RM of Bayne No. 371 is governed by an elected municipal council and an appointed administrator that meets on the second Wednesday of every month. The reeve of the RM is Michael Kane while its administrator is Diana Koenning. The RM's office is located in Bruno.
