= Vonda, Saskatchewan =

Town in Saskatchewan, Canada

Vonda
- Town
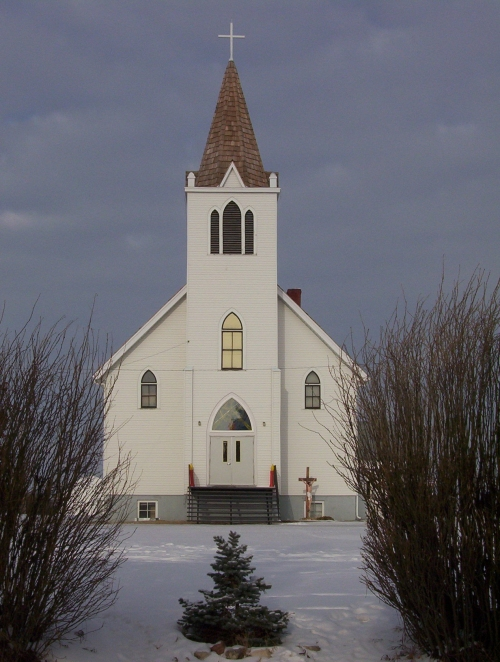
- St. Philippe Neri Roman Catholic Church

- Location of Vonda in Saskatchewan Vonda (Canada)
- Coordinates: 52.323°N 106.092°W
- Country: Canada
- Province: Saskatchewan
- Census division: 15
- Rural municipality: Grant No. 372
- Post office Founded: April 1, 1905
- Incorporated (Village): 1905
- Incorporated (Town): 1907

Government
  - Mayor: Brenda Willman
  - Town Manager: Linda Denis
  - Governing body: Vonda Town Council

Area
  - Total: 2.79 km^{2} (1.08 sq mi)

Population (2006)
  - Total: 322
  - Density: 112.7/km^{2} (292/sq mi)
- Time zone: CST
- Postal code: S0K 4N0
- Area code: 306
- Highways: Highway 27
- Website: Official website

Vonda is located on Highway 27, a half-hour drive north-east of Saskatoon, Saskatchewan, Canada. The town was named after the daughter of American journalist Cy Warman.

Vonda is home to the École Providence French language school providing Kindergarten to Grade 12, while Aberdeen Composite School in neighbouring Aberdeen provides Kindergarten to Grade 12 instruction in English. The town also contains the Paroisse St. Philippe de Neri Parish Roman Catholic Church and the Sacred Heart Ukrainian Catholic Church. The town is also home to the Vonda Memorial Rink. The town contains a Co-op, hotel, and service businesses.

The Vonda post office originally opened on April 1, 1905, under the name Vaunder, changing its name to Vonda on May 1, 1906.

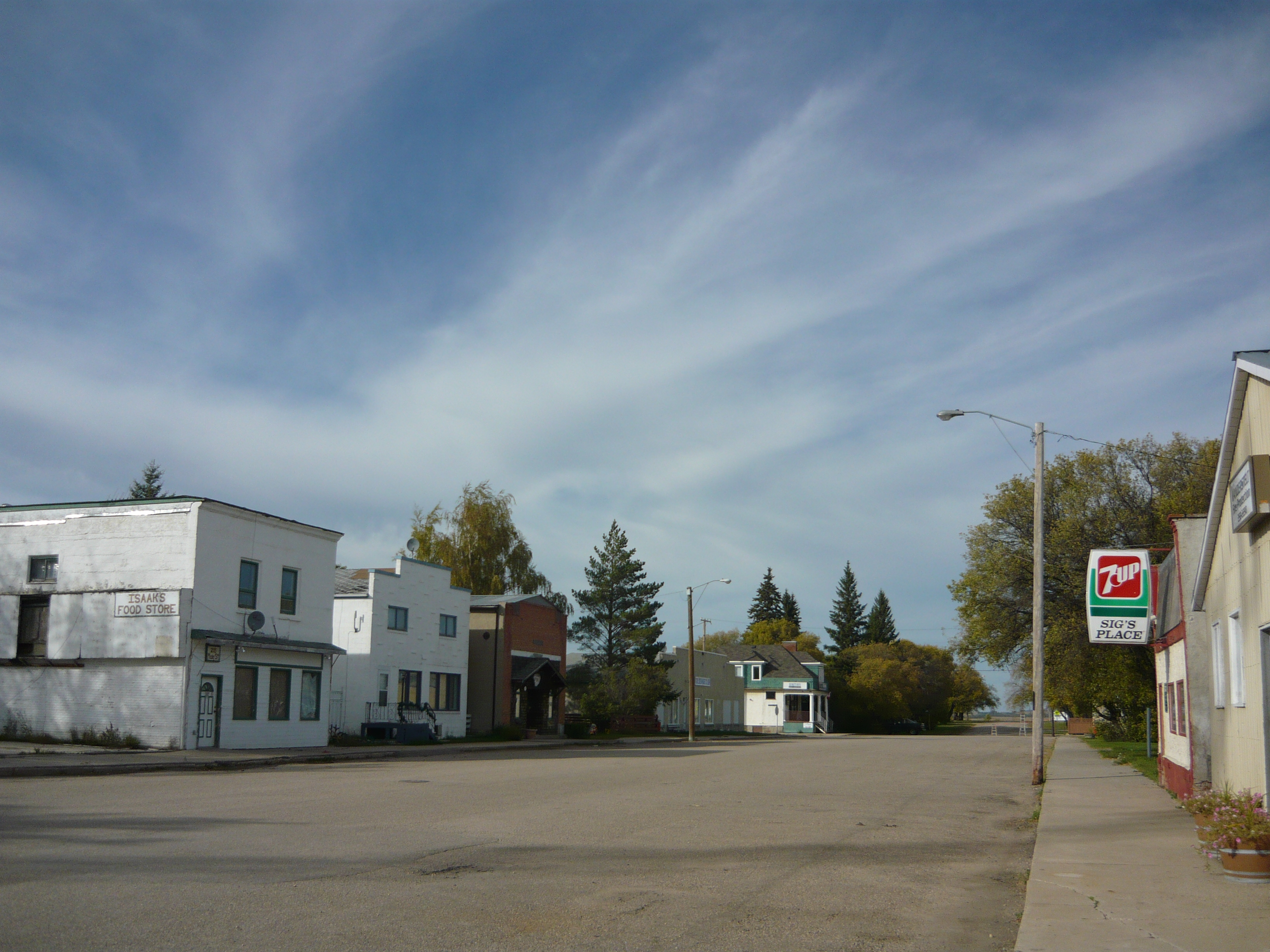
Main Street

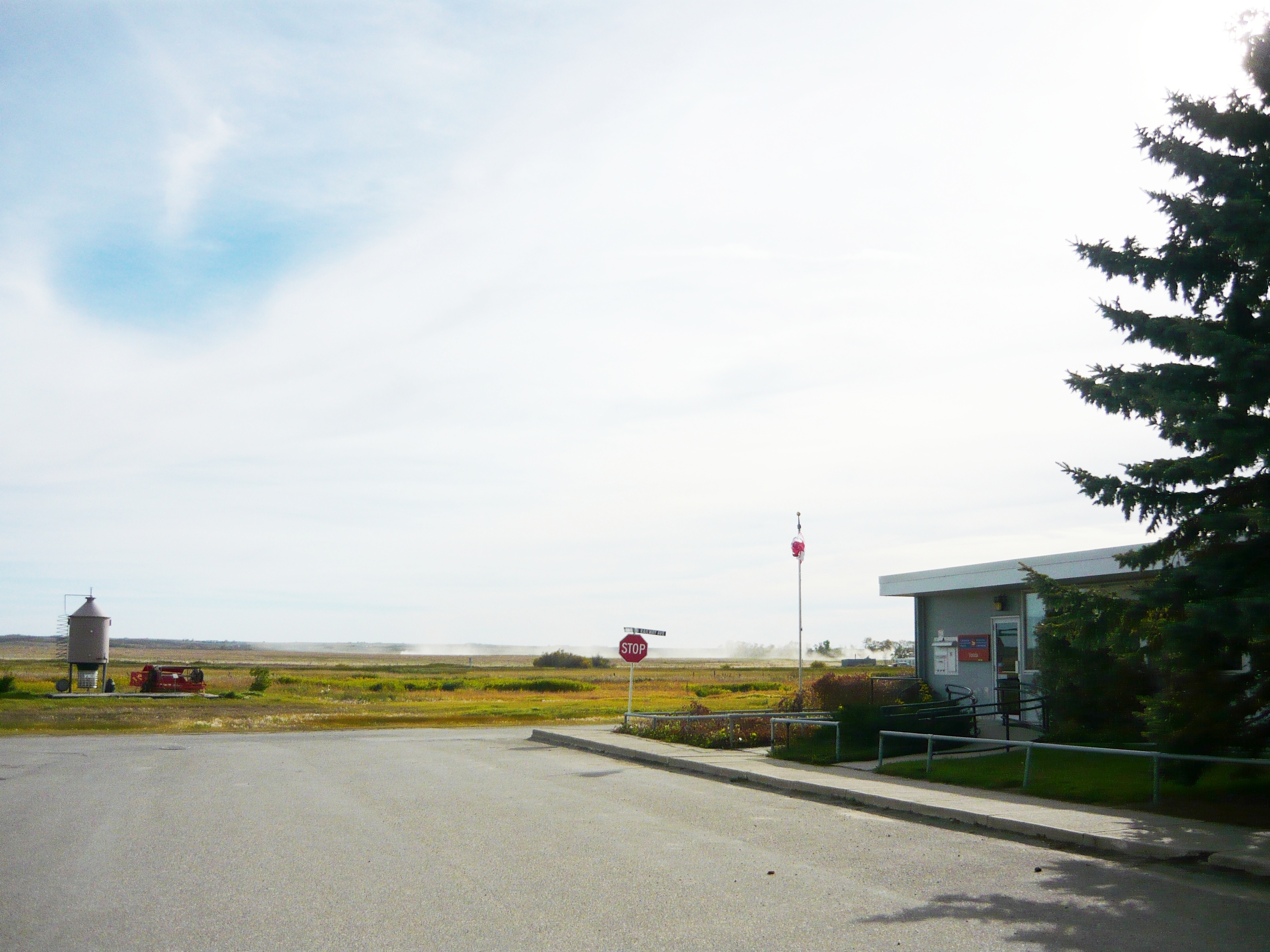
At prairie's edge

== Demographics ==
In the 2021 Census of Population conducted by Statistics Canada, Vonda had a population of 384 living in 147 of its 160 total private dwellings, a change of 0% from its 2016 population of 384. With a land area of 2.75 km^{2} (1.06 sq mi), it had a population density of 139.6/km^{2} (361.7/sq mi) in 2021.

Canada census – Vonda, Saskatchewan community profile

	2011
Population	353 (9.6% from 2006)
Land area	2.86 km^{2} (1.10 sq mi)
Population density	123.6/km^{2} (320/sq mi)
Median age
Private dwellings	138 (total)
Median household income

References: 2011

== Notable people ==
- Paul de Margerie, composer

== See also ==
- List of communities in Saskatchewan
- List of francophone communities in Saskatchewan
- List of towns in Saskatchewan
