= Kamsack =

Town in Saskatchewan, Canada

- Town
- Location of Kamsack Kamsack (Canada)
- Coordinates: 51°33′54″N 101°53′41″W
- Country: Canada
- Province: Saskatchewan
- Census division: 9
- Rural municipality: Cote No. 271
- Post office established: 1888 (Assiniboia District)

Government
  - Mayor: Beth Dix
  - MLA Canora-Pelly: Sean Wilson
  - MP Yorkton—Melville: Cathay Wagantall

Area
  - Land: 5.85 km^{2} (2.26 sq mi)

Population (2016)
  - Total: 1,898
  - Density: 325.3/km^{2} (843/sq mi)
- Time zone: UTC−6 (CST)
- Postal code: S0A 1S0
- Area codes: 306 / 639
- Highways: Highway 5 / Highway 8
- Website: www.kamsack.ca

Kamsack, Saskatchewan, Canada, is a town in the Assiniboine River Valley, where the Whitesand River joins the Assiniboine River. It is 56 kilometres (35 mi) northeast of Yorkton. Highway 8 and Highway 5 intersect in the town.

Cote First Nation is 8 kilometres (5 mi) north and Keeseekoose First Nation is 18 kilometres (11 mi) north of Kamsack on Highway 8.

== History ==
In 1904, land was surrendered from the Cote First Nation for the Canadian Northern Railway station and the town site of Kamsack. Between 1905 and 1907 additional land was allocated, the northern sections of which were returned to Indian reserve status. In 1913 a further two-mile strip of land on the southern boundary was given, but returned in 1915 when it was identified the Cote people had lost too much of their best agricultural land. In 1963, further acres surrendered in 1905 were also reconstituted as reserve land. The interest in and surrender of land from the reserve's southern boundary—nearest the Kamsack town site—resulted partly from speculation of its value for settlement.

The lands around what is now Kamsack were settled in the 1880s by a handful of agricultural settlers. The farming area around Kamsack was well settled by 1905. These farms consisted of a variety of ethnic groups which are still present to this day: Independent Doukhobors, Ukrainians, Americans, and Eastern Canadians were all among the early settlers to the area.

In 1903 the Canadian Northern Railway and Kamsack railway station were built which literally forced the birth of Kamsack. The town is served today by Via Rail's Winnipeg–Churchill train.

The name Kamsack came from an early post office of the same name, which was in one of the early settlers' homes. The name is derived from kamesak kîkway (Cree for 'large, something large') – compare the name of the Manitoba electoral district The Pas-Kameesak. In the 1900s, the Doukhobor village called Nadezhda (Russian: Надежда, 'Hope'), some 15 km to the northwest of Kamsack, was the site of the annual general meetings of the Doukhobor community of Saskatchewan. By around 1910, the meeting site has shifted to the village of Veregin, some 10 km west of Kamsack, where a permanent Doukhobor central office was established.

The first buildings were constructed in 1904 along the north side of the Canadian Northern Railway. These included a general store, drug store, pool room, hotel and post office. In the spring of 1905 the first school was opened in the Hallson building (named after a local businessman and town councillor). The village grew rapidly and by 1911 it had a population of over 500 people and was declared a town. The town continued to expand and by 1913 its property assessment totalled $1.2 million. In the summer of 1914 construction was started on the waterworks, sewage system and electric light plant. By 1921 the population was in excess of 2,000 people and the expansion of services continued to take place.

During the depression years Kamsack suffered, as did all communities during the period, and as a result the town's population dropped to 1,800 people. This exodus of people was small compared to many other communities and Kamsack survived. During the summer of 1944 Kamsack once again faced adversity when it was hit by a tornado that is now referred to as the "Kamsack Cyclone". The devastation involved 400 homes and 100 businesses and caused over $2 million damage. The rebuilding process began again with the help of the veterans returning from World War II. As it turned out, this period turned into the biggest building boom in the town's history.

This building period included business, public and residential sections of the town. Water and sewer systems were extended, streets were paved and cement sidewalks were built. The building boom continued right up to 1961 when the census showed 2,941 residents in the town. In the 1970s Kamsack saw its business district continue to grow with the arrival of the Royal Bank, the construction of the "Kamplex" (a dual purpose hockey and curling rink) and construction began on the new hospital.

== Demographics ==
In the 2021 Census of Population conducted by Statistics Canada, Kamsack had a population of 1,779 living in 792 of its 903 total private dwellings, a change of −6.3% from its 2016 population of 1,898. With a land area of 5.67 km^{2} (2.19 sq mi), it had a population density of 313.8/km^{2} (812.6/sq mi) in 2021.

Canada census – Kamsack community profile

	2021	2016	2011
Population	1,779 (-6.3% from 2016)	1,898 (+4.0% from 2011)	1,825 (+6.5% from 2006)
Land area	5.67 km^{2} (2.19 sq mi)	5.83 km^{2} (2.25 sq mi)	5.85 km^{2} (2.26 sq mi)
Population density	313.5/km^{2} (812/sq mi)	325.3/km^{2} (843/sq mi)	311.8/km^{2} (808/sq mi)
Median age	47.6 (M: 45.6, F: 50.0)	47.8 (M: 44.6, F: 49.7)	48.9 (M: 46.9, F: 50.1)
Private dwellings	903 (total) 792 (occupied)	976 (total)	949 (total)
Median household income	$58,400	$46,112

References: 2021 2016 2011

== Attractions ==
- Kamsack Culture Days
- Kamsack Powerhouse Museum
- National Doukhobor Heritage Village is located 10 km (6 mi) west of Kamsack at Veregin
- Duck Mountain Provincial Park

== Education ==
The public schools in Kamsack are part of Good Spirit School Division. Victoria School offers Pre-Kindergarten to Grade 4 and Kamsack Comprehensive Institute offers grades 5 to 12.

Parkland Regional College offers post-secondary education, SIAST and general interest classes.

== Notable people ==
- Eleanor Coerr
- Myrna Dey
- Wilbur Jackett
- Jack Church
- Darcy Hordichuk
- Harold Phillipoff
- Tyler Wright

== See also ==
- List of place names in Canada of Indigenous origin
- Kamsack Airport
- List of towns in Saskatchewan
