= Togo, Saskatchewan =

Village in Saskatchewan, Canada

Coordinates: 51°24′13″N 101°35′04″W

An aerial view of Togo

Togo (2016 population: 86) is a village in the Canadian province of Saskatchewan within the Rural Municipality of Cote No. 271 and Census Division No. 9. It is 800 metres (1/2 mile) west of the Manitoba border and approximately 72 km (45 mi) northeast of the city of Yorkton.

In 1906, after the Russo-Japanese War, two names stood out: Admiral Togo of the Japanese fleet and Admiral Makaroff of Russia. In 1906, Pelly Siding was incorporated as a village and renamed Togo after the Japanese admiral, and the next community to the east on the CNR line (5 miles) was named Makaroff (Manitoba) in honour of the Russian admiral.

Despite the small population, Togo has a post office, Lutheran church, curling/skating rink, and a drop-in centre. Besides farming, local activities include fishing or playing hockey. There used to be several grain elevators located just off the railway.

Togo station is served by Via Rail's Winnipeg–Churchill train. In April 2013, a passenger train derailed near the village. No one was injured.

== History ==
Togo incorporated as a village on September 4, 1906.

This village was founded after the Japanese had won several victories in the war against Russia (Russo-Japanese War 1904–05). Britain was allied with Japan in this war and Japan was a very popular nation throughout the British Empire. Three towns in Saskatchewan along the CN line (Togo, Kuroki, Mikado), a regional park (Oyama), and CN Siding (Fukushiama) were named in honour of Japanese achievements in this war.

== Demographics ==
Population history (1981–2016)
Year	Pop.	±%
1981	181	—
1986	176	−2.8%
1991	165	−6.2%
1996	138	−16.4%
2001	143	+3.6%
2006	100	−30.1%
2011	87	−13.0%
2016	86	−1.1%
Source: Statistics Canada via Saskatchewan Bureau of Statistics

In the 2021 Census of Population conducted by Statistics Canada, Togo had a population of 83 living in 46 of its 62 total private dwellings, a change of −3.5% from its 2016 population of 86. With a land area of 1.44 km^{2} (0.56 sq mi), it had a population density of 57.6/km^{2} (149.3/sq mi) in 2021.

In the 2016 Census of Population, the Village of Togo recorded a population of 86 living in 45 of its 63 total private dwellings, a −1.2% change from its 2011 population of 87. With a land area of 1.5 km^{2} (0.58 sq mi), it had a population density of 57.3/km^{2} (148.5/sq mi) in 2016.

== Notable people ==
- Ted Hampson, former NHL player
- Reginald John Marsden Parker, former Lieutenant Governor of Saskatchewan

== See also ==
- List of villages in Saskatchewan
