= List of former counties of Manitoba =

In Manitoba, counties were originally only organized for judicial purposes. Between 1875 and 1890, they also existed for municipal purposes.

== History ==
In 1875, provision was made for a majority of the electors in a judicial county to petition to have it organized for municipal purposes. By 1881, the Legislative Assembly of Manitoba passed legislation to redivide the entire Province into municipal counties, as a consequence of its enlargement.

They existed only until 1890, though the term itself lived on with respect to the County Courts and land registration districts.

== Organization ==
The Municipal Act, 1886 listed the counties of Manitoba as follows:

Number	County	United County	Rural Municipalities	Cities/Towns
1	Lisgar	Lisgar, Plessis, and Gimli	St. Andrews', St. Clements'	East Selkirk, Selkirk
2	Gimli	Lisgar, Plessis, and Gimli	Gimli, Rockwood	
3	Plessis	Lisgar, Plessis, and Gimli	Plessis	
5	Manchester		Douglas, Franklin, Montcalm	Emerson, West Lynne
6	Carillon		La Broquerie, Hanover, De Salaberry	
7	Morris		Morris, Youville	Morris
8	La Verandrye		Hespeler, Ste. Anne, Taché	
9	D'Iberville		Cartier, Macdonald, St. Norbert	
10	Selkirk		Assiniboia, Kildonan, Springfield, St. Boniface, St. Paul, Varennes	St. Boniface, Winnipeg
11	Marquette	Marquette and Fairford	Belcourt, St. François Xavier, Woodlands	
12	Fairford	Marquette and Fairford	Fairford, Posen, St. Laurent	
13	Dufferin		Carleton, Dufferin, Rhineland	Nelson
14	Portage la Prairie		Elm River, Portage la Prairie	Portage la Prairie
15	Norfolk		North Cypress, North Norfolk, South Cypress, South Norfolk	
16	Rock Lake		Argyle, Derby, Lorne, Louise	Pilot Mound
17	Westbourne		Westbourne	Gladstone
18	Beautiful Plains		Glendale, Osprey, Lansdowne, Rosedale	
19	Riding Mountain	Minnedosa and Riding Mountain	Riding Mountain	
20	Minnedosa	Minnedosa and Riding Mountain	Blanchard [sic], Clanwilliam, Harrison, Odanah, Saskatchewan, Strathclair	Minnedosa, Rapid City
21	Brandon		Cornwallis, Daly, Elton, Glenwood, Oakland, Whitehead	Brandon
22	Turtle Mountain		Deloraine, Riverside, Turtle Mountain, Whitewater	
23	Souris River		Arthur, Brenda, Inchiquin, Medora	
24	Dennis		Sifton, Pipestone, Wallace, Woodworth	
25	Shoal Lake	Shoal Lake and Russell	Archie, Birtle, Boulton, Ellice, Miniota, Oak River, Shoal Lake	
26	Russell	Shoal Lake and Russell	Rossburn, Russell, Shell River, Silver Creek	

County No. 4 (Varennes), created in 1881, occupied that part of Manitoba around Rat Portage, in an area disputed with Ontario. It was abolished subsequent to the Judicial Committee of the Privy Council's decision in 1884 to award the territory to Ontario, later confirmed by the Canada (Ontario Boundary) Act 1889.

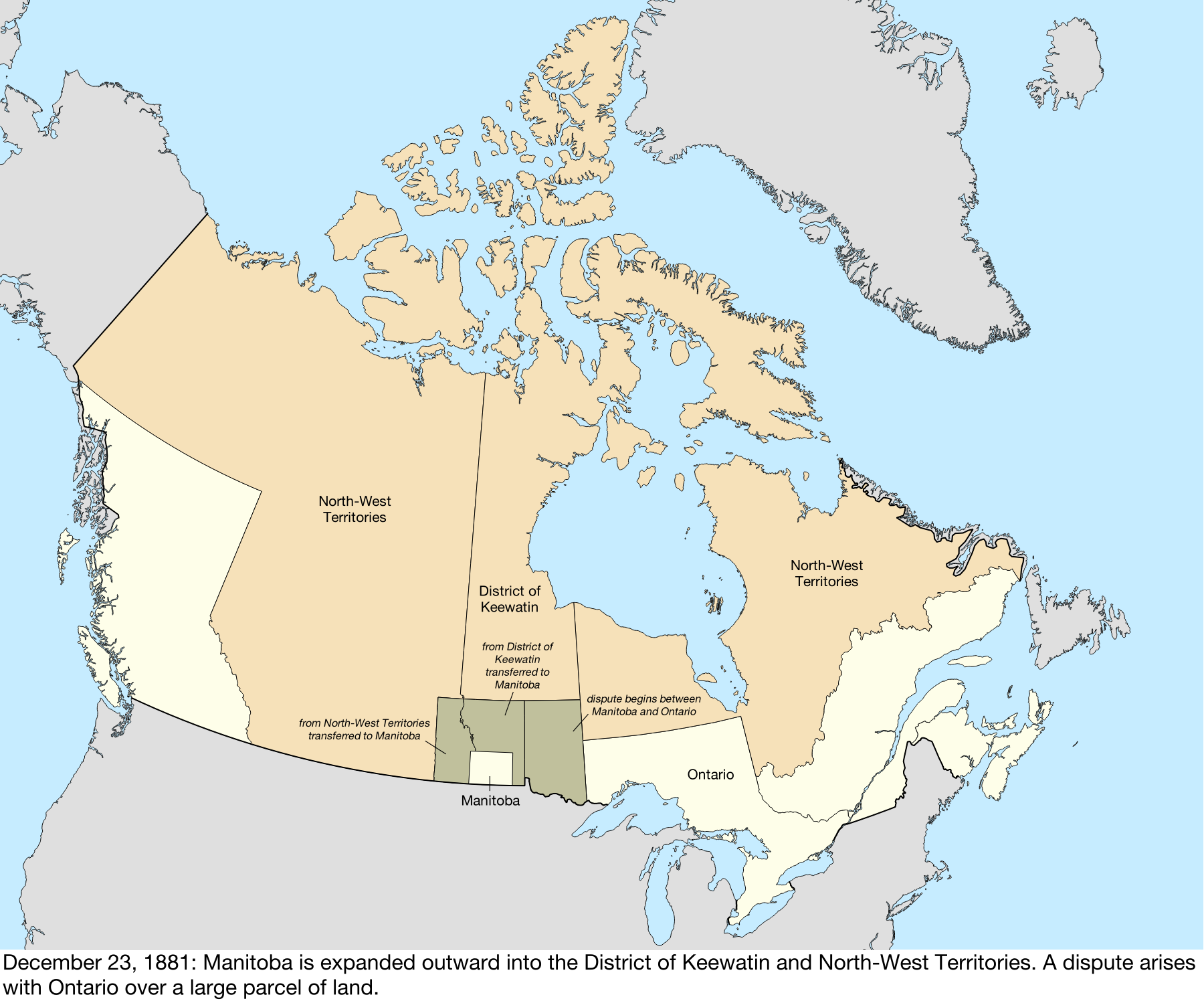
Manitoba expansion, as enacted in 1881

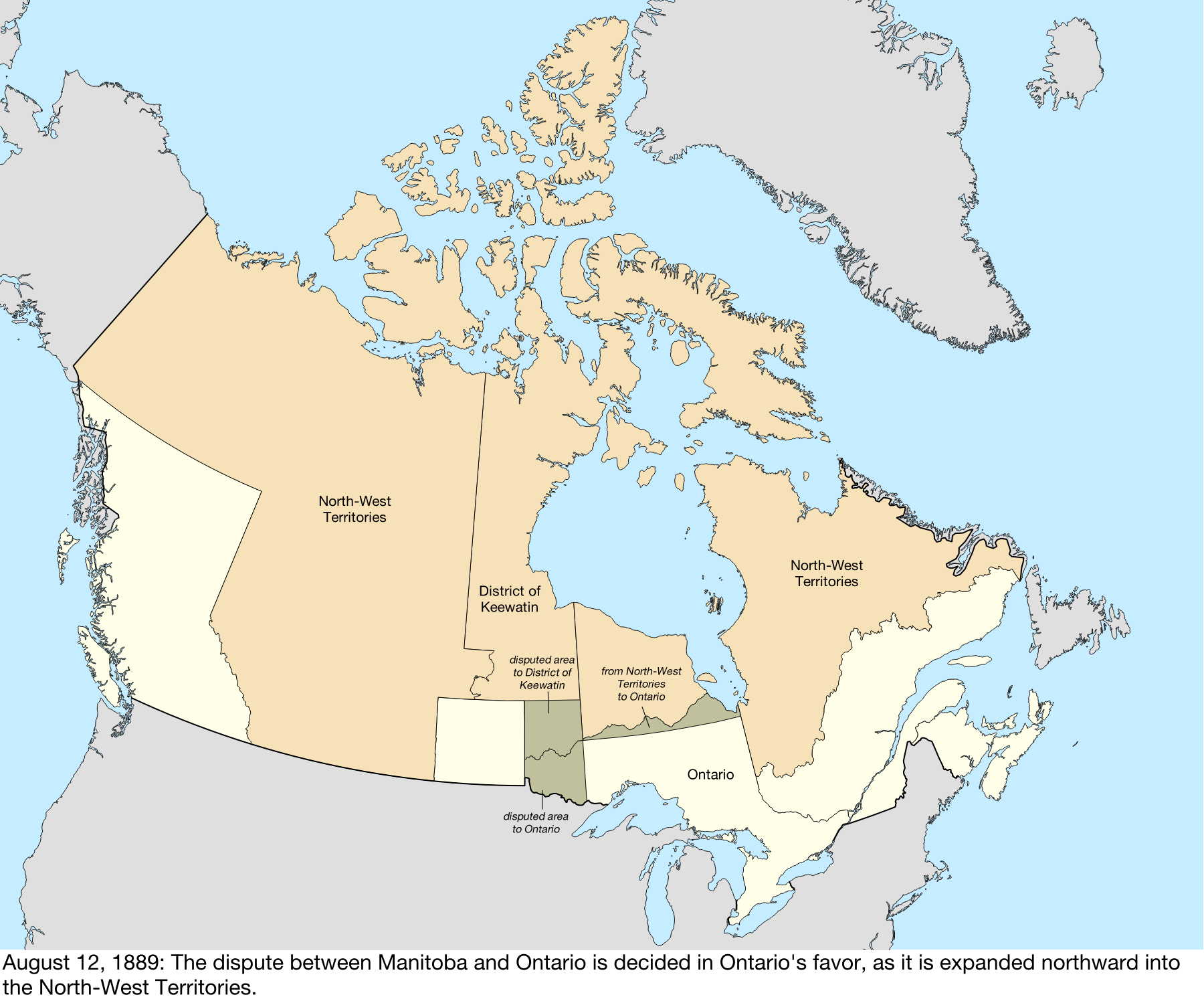
areas withdrawn in 1889

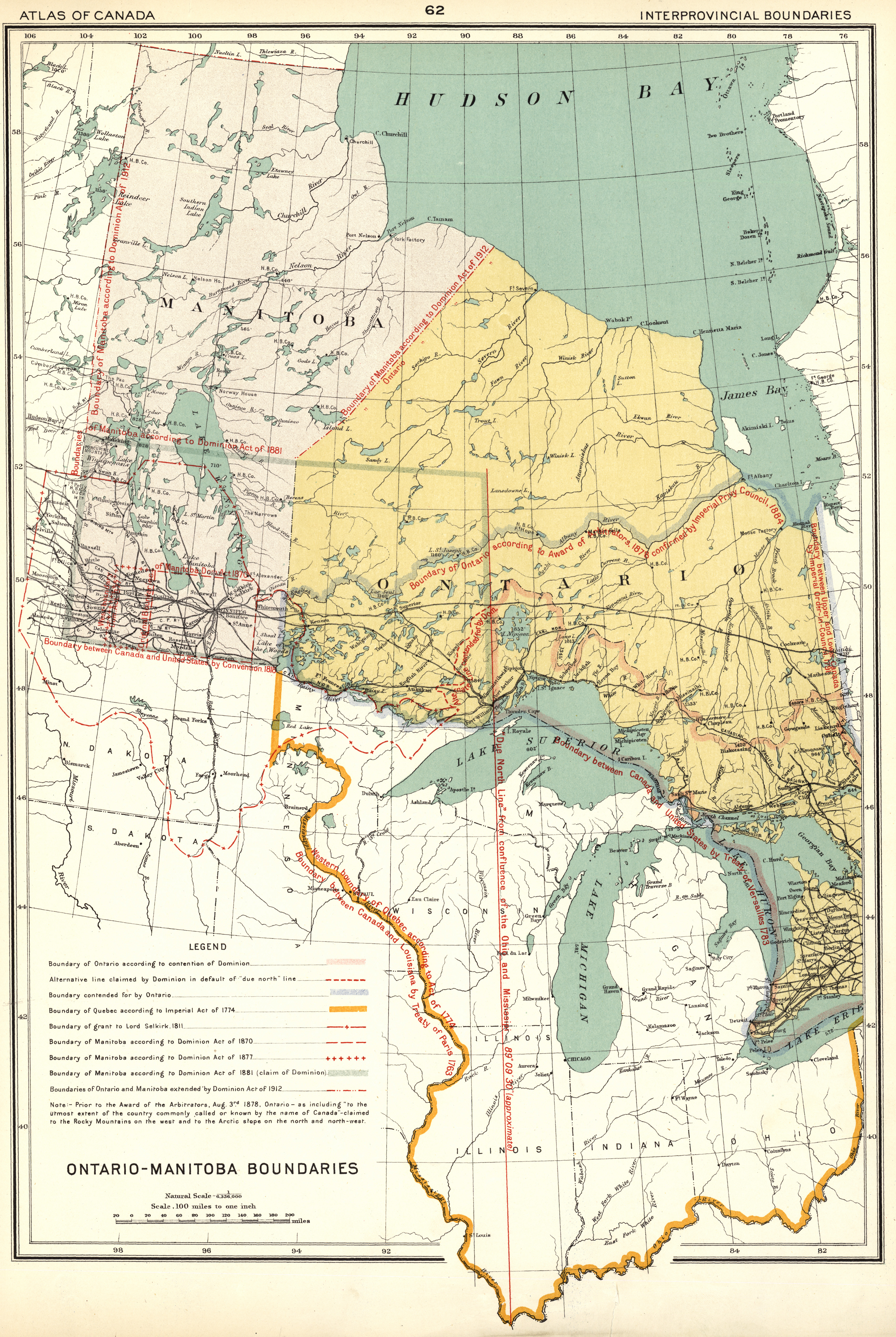
summary of territorial claims and boundary changes (1870-1912)
