= List of historic places in Parkland Region, Manitoba =

This is a list of historic places in Parkland Region, Manitoba entered on the Canadian Register of Historic Places, whether they are federal, provincial, or municipal.

== List of historic places ==
Name	Address	Coordinates	Government recognition (CRHP №)	Wikidata ID	Image
Inglis Grain Elevators National Historic Site	Inglis MB	50°56′39″N 101°14′56″W	Federal (7875), Manitoba (4166)		More images
Ukrainian Greek Orthodox Church of the Ascension	Silver Creek MB	50°44′06″N 101°01′01″W	Silver Creek municipality (9026)		Upload Photo
Lakedale Holy Ghost Ukrainian Catholic Church	Silver Creek MB	50°47′01″N 100°58′26″W	Silver Creek municipality (14523)		Upload Photo
Ukrainian People's Home of Ivan Franko	Wright Avenue; Silver Creek MB	50°44′03″N 101°01′05″W	Silver Creek municipality (2910)		Upload Photo
Angusville Municipal Building	235 Main Street; Silver Creek MB	50°44′03″N 101°01′12″W	Silver Creek municipality (8235)		Upload Photo
North American Lumber Co. Building	162 - 2nd Street; Binscarth MB	50°37′33″N 101°17′13″W	Binscarth municipality (3218)		Upload Photo
Bank of Montreal Building	5 Railway Avenue North; Ethelbert MB	51°32′N 100°24′W	Ethelbert municipality (4174)		Upload Photo
Ruskin School	Ethelbert MB	51°30′49″N 100°26′20″W	Ethelbert municipality (8230)		Upload Photo
Makaroff Hall	Shell River MB	51°21′03″N 101°30′29″W	Shell River municipality (8455)		Upload Photo
Ukrainian Greek Orthodox Church of St. John the Baptist	Ethelbert MB	51°39′16″N 100°27′36″W	Ethelbert municipality (8864)		Upload Photo
Garland United Church	Ethelbert MB	51°39′09″N 100°27′36″W	Ethelbert municipality (8865)		Upload Photo
Toutes Aides Roman Catholic Church	Lawrence MB	51°29′13″N 99°32′00″W	Lawrence municipality (6262)		
Ruthenian Greek Catholic Church of the Blessed Virgin Mary	Lawrence MB	51°27′17″N 99°31′38″W	Lawrence municipality (6264)		Upload Photo
St. Margaret's Anglican Church	112 Willow Avenue; Mountain (North) MB	52°40′56″N 101°06′36″W	Mountain (North) municipality (9025)		Upload Photo
Griswold United Church	Patterson Street; Sifton MB	49°43′34″N 100°31′12″W	Manitoba (4306)		Upload Photo
Tummel United Church	Shell River MB	51°08′24″N 101°23′53″W	Shell River municipality (9441)		Upload Photo
Horod School	NE 22-19-21W; Park (South) MB	50°39′07″N 100°18′00″W	Park (South) municipality (3749)		Upload Photo
Sts. Peter and Paul Roman Catholic Church	SE 7-19-21 WPM; Park (South) MB	50°37′04″N 100°22′12″W	Park (South) municipality (4828)		Upload Photo
Assumption of the Blessed Virgin Mary Ukrainian Catholic Church	Park (South) MB	50°42′41″N 100°26′20″W	Park (South) municipality (6256)		Upload Photo
Ruthenian Greek Catholic Church of the Ascension	Park (South) MB	50°38′19″N 100°10′16″W	Park (South) municipality (6291)		Upload Photo
Sts. Peter and Paul Ukrainian Orthodox Church	Park (South) MB	50°40′57″N 100°29′06″W	Park (South) municipality (16347)		Upload Photo
Sts. Peter and Paul Ukrainian United Church	Shellmouth-Boulton MB	51°00′27″N 101°12′50″W	Shellmouth-Boulton municipality (6533)		Upload Photo
St. Elijah Romanian Orthodox Church	SW 24-23-24 W Shellmouth-Boulton MB	50°59′36″N 101°16′08″W	Manitoba (3907)		Upload Photo
Shellmouth United Church	Shellmouth-Boulton MB	50°56′00″N 101°28′41″W	Shellmouth-Boulton municipality (5371)		Upload Photo
Paulencu House	Shellmouth-Boulton MB	50°59′36″N 101°16′12″W	Manitoba (6435)		Upload Photo
Our Lady of Seven Sorrows Roman Catholic Church	Mountain (South) MB	52°00′15″N 100°09′04″W	Manitoba (6266)		Upload Photo
St. Michael's Ukrainian Catholic Church	NW 20-26-20 WPM; Dauphin MB	51°16′12″N 100°14′56″W	Manitoba (4107)		Upload Photo
Elaschuk House	Roblin MB	51°13′45″N 101°15′07″W	Manitoba (4172)		Upload Photo
Former Canadian Northern Railway Station	126 First Avenue; Roblin MB	51°13′47″N 101°21′11″W	Federal (6547)		Upload Photo
South Bay School	Winnipegosis MB	51°40′59″N 100°03′04″W	Winnipegosis municipality (6170)		Upload Photo
Holy Resurrection Russian Orthodox Church	Ogryzlo Street; Dauphin MB	51°21′37″N 100°08′20″W	Dauphin municipality (6259)		Upload Photo
Tamarisk United Church	Grandview MB	50°11′46″N 100°38′53″W	Manitoba (5097)		Upload Photo
Tamarisk School	Grandview MB	51°05′46″N 100°40′12″W	Manitoba (15281), Grandview municipality (6159)		Upload Photo
Rhodes Community Hall	Dauphin MB	51°28′31″N 100°31′59″W	Dauphin municipality (8456)		Upload Photo
Cromarty School	Roblin MB	51°13′40″N 101°28′08″W	Roblin municipality (8457)		Upload Photo
Ukrainian Greek Orthodox Church of Sts. Peter and Paul	Dauphin MB	51°00′48″N 100°12′11″W	Dauphin municipality (9422)		Upload Photo
T.A. Burrows Mill Site	Grandview MB	51°10′47″N 100°42′47″W	Grandview municipality (11501)		Upload Photo
Dauphin Town Hall	104 1st Avenue NW; Dauphin MB	51°09′03″N 100°03′04″W	Manitoba (3974)		
Former Canadian Northern Railway Station	101 1st Avenue NW; Dauphin MB	51°09′00″N 100°03′04″W	Federal (6496), Manitoba (3921)		More images
Ukrainian Catholic Church of the Resurrection National Historic Site of Canada	1106 First Street SW; Dauphin MB	51°08′31″N 100°03′43″W	Federal (12283), Manitoba (3917)		
Negrych Homestead	SE 14-27-22 W Gilbert Plains MB	51°18′24″N 100°27′07″W	Manitoba (3912)		Upload Photo
Gilbert Plains Beef Ring Building	Gilbert Plains MB	51°05′36″N 100°27′47″W	Gilbert Plains municipality (8388)		Upload Photo
Law Office Building	510 Main Street; Swan River MB	52°06′20″N 101°16′12″W	Swan River municipality (8395)		Upload Photo
Satterthwaite House	McCreary MB	50°42′34″N 99°29′10″W	McCreary municipality (5082)		Upload Photo
Canal School	Railway Street; McCreary MB	50°46′27″N 99°29′33″W	McCreary municipality (5798)		Upload Photo
Former Canadian Northern Railway Station	Railway St. (between 1st and 2nd Ave.); McCreary MB	50°46′24″N 99°29′25″W	Federal (6630)		Upload Photo
Torsky Cabin	Rossburn MB	50°44′42″N 100°48′25″W	Rossburn municipality (6158)		Upload Photo
Armstrong Farm Site	Rossburn MB	50°35′57″N 100°47′20″W	Rossburn municipality (6257)		Upload Photo
Ukrainian Pioneer Mass Grave Site	Rossburn MB	50°38′28″N 100°35′38″W	Rossburn municipality (6258)		Upload Photo
Sts. Peter and Paul Ukrainian Catholic Church	Rossburn MB	50°41′57″N 100°40′34″W	Rossburn municipality (6263)		Upload Photo
Our Lady of the Assumption Roman Catholic Church	Rossburn MB	50°38′20″N 100°33′14″W	Rossburn municipality (6290)		Upload Photo
Ukrainian Greek Orthodox Church of the Assumption of St. Mary	Rossburn MB	50°47′08″N 100°51′25″W	Rossburn municipality (6491)		Upload Photo
Marconi School	NW 23-20-23 WPM; Rossburn MB	50°44′24″N 100°34′34″W	Rossburn municipality (3750)		Upload Photo
St. Michael's Ukrainian Catholic Church	Rossburn MB	50°40′10″N 100°33′18″W	Rossburn municipality (6673)		Upload Photo
Glen Elmo School	Rossburn MB	50°50′39″N 100°50′02″W	Rossburn municipality (6916)		Upload Photo
Smellie Bros. and Co. Store	300 Main Street; Russell MB	50°14′49″N 99°50′36″W	Russell municipality (2715)		Upload Photo
Harley House	515 2nd Street North; Swan River MB	52°06′20″N 101°15′54″W	Swan River municipality (16348)		Upload Photo
Superintendent's Residence and Works Garage	Riding Mountain National Park; Wasagaming MB	50°40′33″N 99°54′51″W	Federal (3457, (3456)		More images
Staff Residence Building B-15	150 Ta-wa-pit Drive, Riding Mountain National Park; Wasagaming MB	50°41′10″N 99°58′05″W	Federal (3459)		More images
Warden's Station Residence No. 1, Building B-18	Riding Mountain National Park; Wasagaming MB	50°53′00″N 100°15′00″W	Federal (4271)		Upload Photo
Bandstand (B9)	Riding Mountain National Park; Wasagaming MB	50°53′00″N 100°15′00″W	Federal (4278)		More images
Accountant's Residence	154 Columbine Street; Wasagaming MB	50°53′00″N 100°15′00″W	Federal (4276)		More images
Casa Loma, Building (A2)	154 Wasagaming Drive; Wasagaming MB	50°53′00″N 100°15′00″W	Federal (4280)		More images
Jamboree Hall, Building B-10	Wasagaming MB	50°53′00″N 100°15′00″W	Federal (4282)		Upload Photo
Tennis Clubhouse (B-6)	Riding Mountain National Park; Wasagaming MB	50°53′00″N 100°15′00″W	Federal (4284)		More images
Riding Mountain Park East Gate Registration Complex National Historic Site of Canada	Norgate Road, Riding Mountain National Park; Wasagaming MB	50°41′00″N 99°33′19″W	Federal (10550, (9479)		
Fire Hall (B-3)	126 Tawapit Drive, Riding Mountain National Park; Wasagaming MB	50°53′00″N 100°15′00″W	Federal (9480)		More images
Doctor’s Residence and Clinic (C5)	140 Ta-wa-pit Drive; Wasagaming MB	50°53′00″N 100°15′00″W	Federal (9483)		More images
Golf Clubhouse (B7)	Riding Mountain National Park; Wasagaming MB	50°53′00″N 100°15′00″W	Federal (9783)		Upload Photo
Grey Owl's Cabin (B21)	Wasagaming MB	50°41′10″N 99°58′05″W	Federal (9915)		Upload Photo
Royal Canadian Air Force Cottage (B16)	Wasagaming MB	50°53′00″N 100°15′00″W	Federal (9917)		Upload Photo
Whirlpool Wardens' Residence	Riding Mountain Park East Gate Registration Complex National Historic Site of Canada; Wasagaming MB	50°41′00″N 99°33′22″W	Federal (9918, (11181)		Upload Photo
Interpretive Centre B1	Riding Mountain National Park; Wasagaming MB	50°53′00″N 100°15′00″W	Federal (14829)		
Park Administration Building	Riding Mountain National Park; Wasagaming MB	50°59′06″N 100°03′47″W	Federal (2888)		More images

== See also ==
- List of historic places in Manitoba
- List of National Historic Sites of Canada in Manitoba
