= Grandview =

Grandview or Grand View may refer to:

== Buildings and institutions ==
- Grand View Hotel, a hotel in the Brisbane suburb of Cleveland, Queensland, Australia
- Grand View University, a Lutheran college in Des Moines, Iowa, US
- Grandview High School (Colorado), a school in Aurora, Colorado, US
- Grandview Hotel, Fairfield, a hotel in the Melbourne suburb of Fairfield, Victoria, Australia
- Grandview Medical Center, a hospital located in Dayton, Ohio, US

== Parks ==
- Grand View Park, a park in the Inner Sunset District, San Francisco, California
- Grand View Scenic Byway Park, former name for Emerald View Park, Pittsburgh, Pennsylvania
- Grandview Drive, a road and park in Peoria and Peoria Heights, Illinois

== Places ==
=== Canada ===
- Grandview, Alberta
- Grandview, Manitoba
- Grandview Municipality, Manitoba
- Rural Municipality of Grandview, a former rural municipality in Manitoba
- Rural Municipality of Grandview No. 349, a currently existing rural municipality in Saskatchewan
- Grandview, Prince Edward Island, a small community in eastern Prince Edward Island
- Grandview–Woodland, a neighbourhood in Vancouver, British Columbia

=== United States ===
- Grand View, Idaho
- Grandview, Illinois
- Grandview, Indiana
- Grandview, Iowa
- Grand View, Michigan
- Grand View, Beaugrand Township, Michigan
- Grand View, Tuscarora Township, Michigan
- Grandview, Missouri
- Grand View-on-Hudson, New York, often simply called Grand View
- Grandview, Hamilton County, Ohio
- Grandview, Washington County, Ohio
- Grandview, Oklahoma
- Grandview, Texas
- Grandview, Washington
- Grandview, West Virginia
- Grandview, Wisconsin, a town
- Grand View, Wisconsin, an unincorporated community
- Grand View Estates, Colorado
- Grandview Heights, Ohio
- Grand View Mountain, another name for Snake Mountain
- Grandview Peak, a mountain in Utah
- Grandview Plaza, Kansas, a city
- Grandview Township (disambiguation)

== Other uses ==
- Grandview, the fictional town in which much of the CBS series Ghost Whisperer takes place
- GrandView (software), an outliner software package no longer supported by Symantec
- Grandview Triangle, highway interchange in Kansas City, Missouri

== See also ==
- Grandview, U.S.A., a 1984 comedy/drama film
- Grandview Cemetery (disambiguation)
- Grandview High School (disambiguation)
- SS Granview, former name of the SS Empire Chamois
