= 2015 Manitoba municipal amalgamations =

The Municipal Amalgamations Act
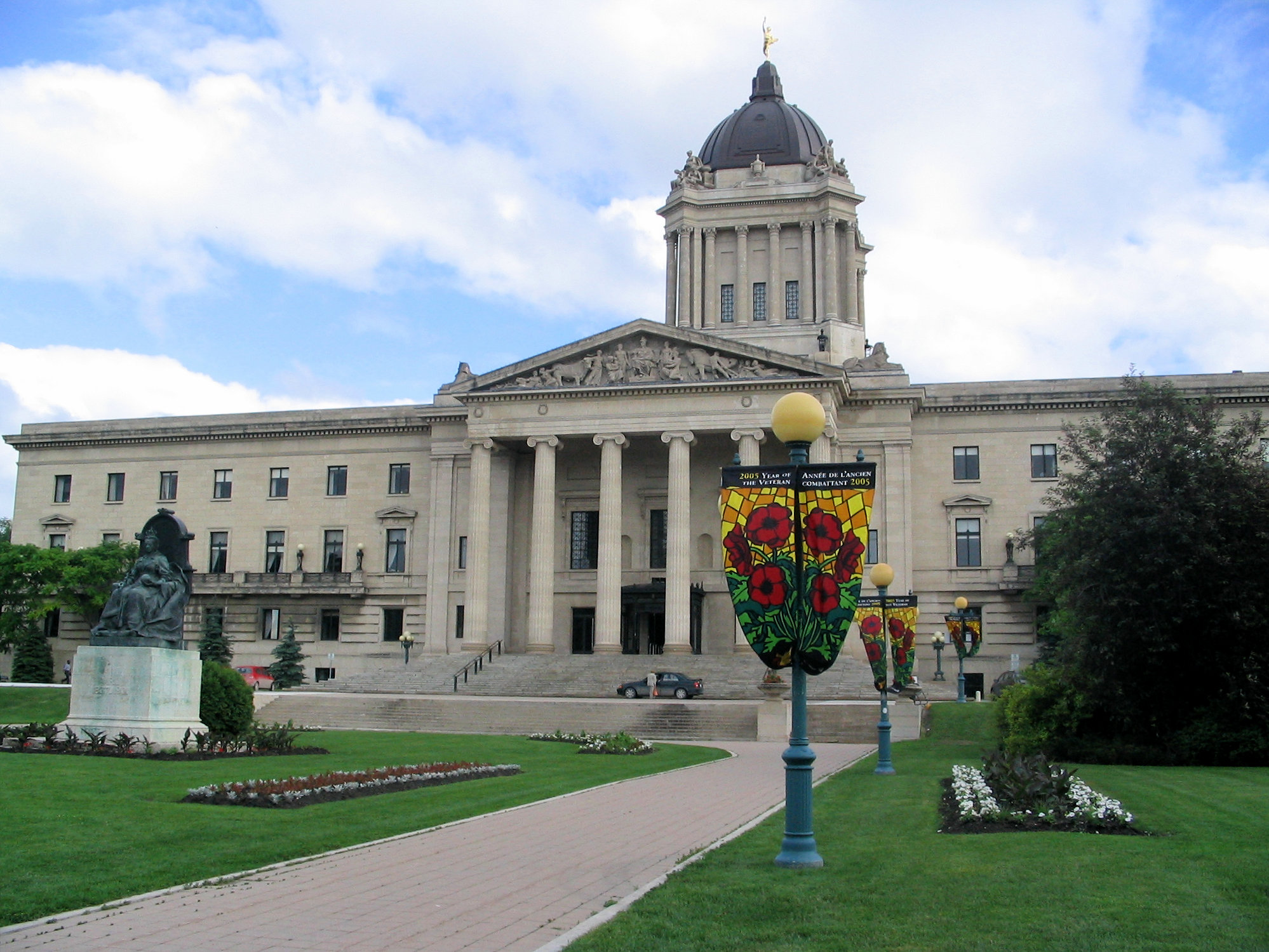

Legislative Assembly of Manitoba
- Citation: C.C.S.M. c. M235
- Enacted by: 2nd Session, 40th Legislature
- Assented to: September 13, 2013
- Commenced: September 13, 2013
- Administered by: Minister of Local Government

Legislative history
- Bill title: Bill 33

Related legislation
- The Planning Act
- Status: Current legislation

The 2015 municipal amalgamations in Manitoba was the result of new legislation (Municipal Amalgamations Act) in the province that required a minimum population threshold of 1,000 people in order to incorporate a municipality.

To meet this new threshold, Manitoba's smaller municipalities—those with a population of less than 1,000—merged with one or more neighbouring municipalities by 2015.

== Background ==
In 1997, the Government of Manitoba established a minimum population threshold of 1,000 in order to incorporate a municipality.

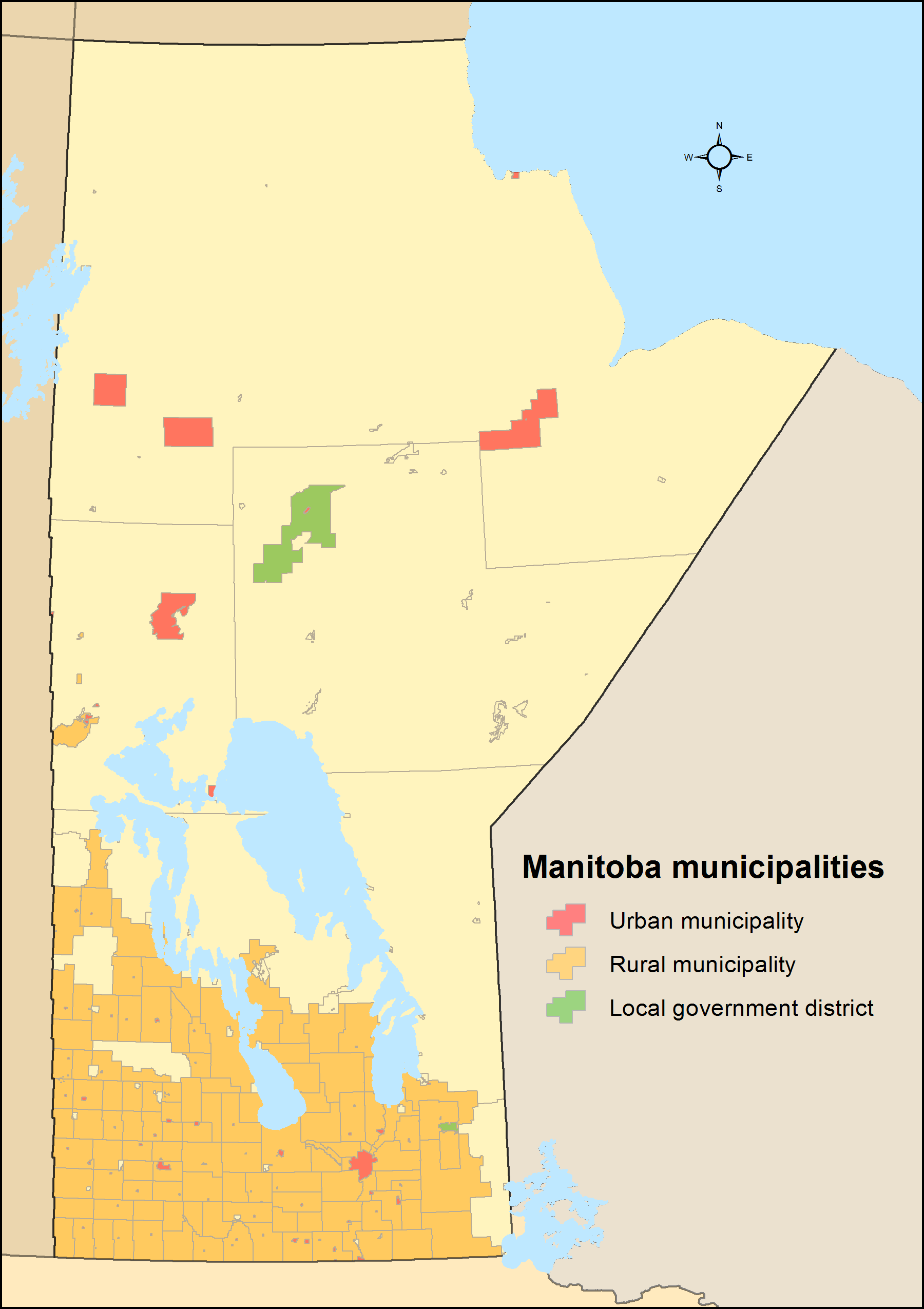
Before amalgamations: 197 municipalities

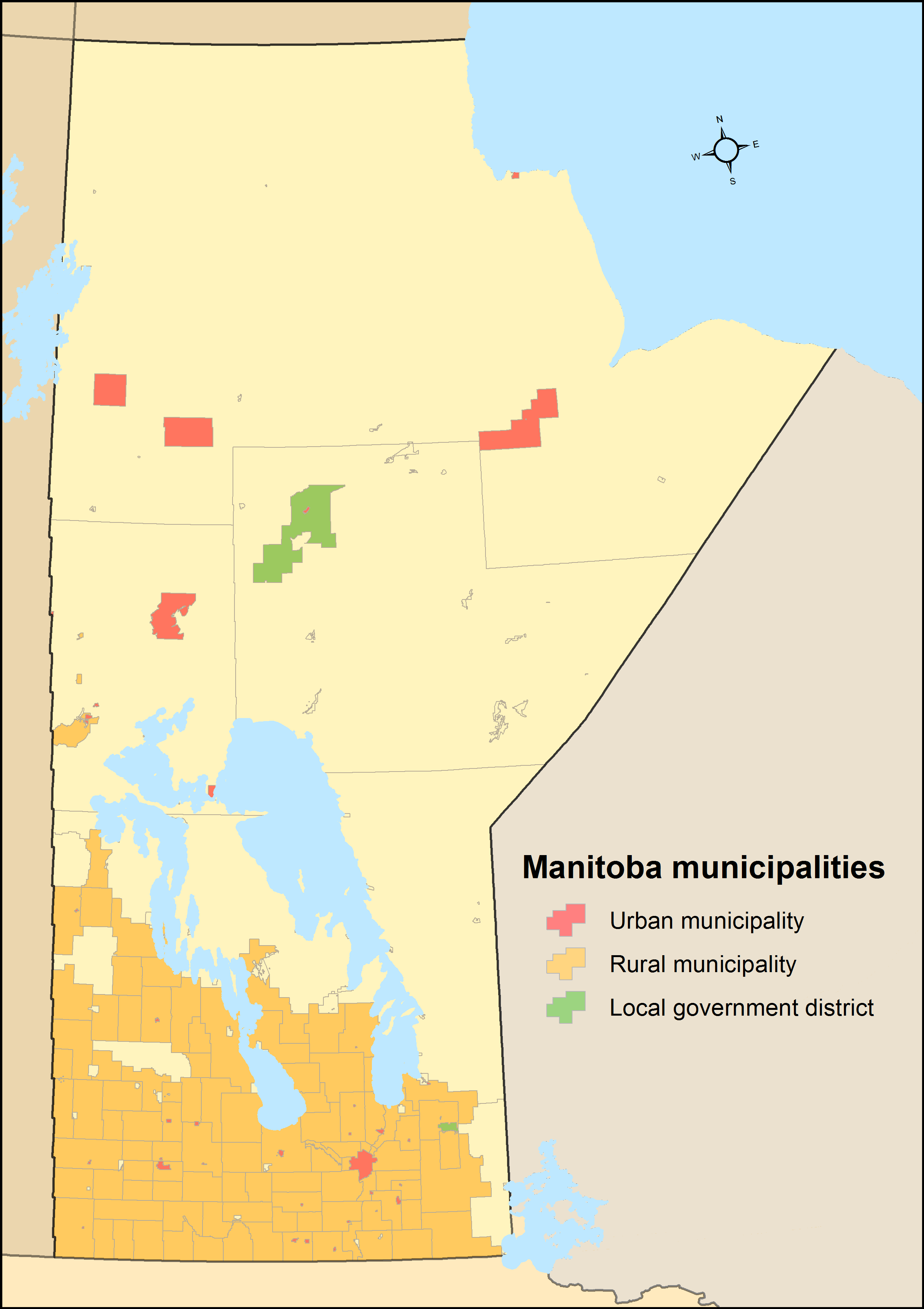
After amalgamations: 137 municipalities

As of the 2011 census, 93 of the 197 municipalities in Manitoba had populations less than 1,000. In 2012, the Manitoba government announced that municipalities would be required to amalgamate in order for them to meet the minimum population threshold and make them more sustainable communities moving forward.

Soon after, The Municipal Amalgamations Act was enacted in 2013, requiring that municipalities with a population less than 1,000 amalgamate with one or more neighbouring municipalities by 2015. The provincial government justified such by arguing that amalgamation would be more efficient and would increase capacity for economic development, thereby strengthening Manitoba's rural communities.

Between 2013 and 2014, regulations under the Act would amalgamate 107 municipalities (65 rural municipalities, 25 towns, and 17 villages) into 47, effective 1 January 2015. These amalgamations therefore reduced the total number of municipalities in the province from 197 to 137. Despite having populations less than 1,000, two municipalities—the Rural Municipality of Victoria Beach and the Village of Dunnattor—were exempted from the requirement to amalgamate due to their uniqueness as resort municipalities. The provincial government also allowed some new amalgamated municipalities to form with a combined population under 1,000.

== Criticism ==
Bill 33 (the Amalgamations Act) received considerable pushback, primarily by the Association of Manitoba Municipalities (AMM).

Among others, concerns regarding amalgamation included the deadline of 1 January 2015, which was seen as too short to complete the process; the arbitrary nature of the proposed population threshold; and questions over administrative and financial efficiency.

In court, the AMM argued that the province ought to have allowed voluntary participation in amalgamation; however, the case was overturned. Speaking before the Standing Committee on Social and Economic Development of the Legislative Assembly of Manitoba in September 2013, the AMM president, Doug Dobrowolski, made the following argument:

Our members have expressed many concerns since the Province of Manitoba announced its intentions to force amalgamations. Although some members support amalgamation and some do not, it is our position that the decision to amalgamate should rest...with the municipal government and its residents. The AMM is not opposed to amalgamation. What we are opposed to is forcing our members to choose a path that may not be right for their community.

Beyond the forced aspect of this bill, our members have numerous other concerns. First, the proposed timeline of January 1st, 2015, is unreasonable. We believe successful amalgamations occur at a pace that is comfortable for all parties, including the citizens of the affected municipalities. Forcing amalgamation is undemocratic and forcing them within a tight time period causes additional unnecessary stress on everyone involved. The bill does allow the minister to extend the timeline for amalgamation to a date no later than January 1st, 2019, as long as the amalgamation plan has been submitted by the deadline specified. However, we believe there is little potential for flexibility in this bill; it is completely at the discretion of the minister.

Furthermore, we believe that the use of 1,000-citizen threshold to determine who must amalgamate is not only an artificial number, but an inaccurate one. We are aware of the many municipalities currently under this population that function at a very high level. We're also very concerned with the proposed elimination of the public input through the Municipal Board. Although the bill states that amalgamating municipalities must provide a reasonable opportunity for members of the public to comment, there is no requirement to involve the Municipal Board. The bill does not mention what would happen if members of the public are opposed to amalgamation.

Finally, although Bill 33 includes provisions to initially keep all policing arrangements the same despite any amalgamations, the AMM has concerns about how it will work in practice. Where one amalgamating municipality has its own police force or is policed by the RCMP, a new arrangement will have to be made within three years. If a new arrangement is not made after the three years to have one police service for the amalgamated municipality, the minister will enter into an agreement with the RCMP to provide policing for that municipality....

While the municipalities are now larger as result of amalgamation, governing bodies are still challenged in curtailing population decline, and encourage growth.

== List of amalgamations ==
New rural municipality	Merging rural municipality(s)	Merging town(s)	Merging village(s)	Pop. (2011)	Pop. (2006)	Change (%)	Land area (km^{2})	Pop. density (per km^{2})
Bifrost – Riverton	Bifrost		Riverton	3,514	3,509	0.1	1,643.69	2.1
Boissevain – Morton	Morton	Boissevain		2,270	2,215	2.5	1,092.65	2.1
Brenda – Waskada	Brenda		Waskada	652	748	−12.8	766.77	0.9
Cartwright – Roblin	Roblin		Cartwright	1,240	1,246	−0.5	718.01	1.7
Clanwilliam – Erickson	Clanwilliam	Erickson		901	940	−4.1	352.08	2.6
Deloraine – Winchester	Winchester	Deloraine		1,485	1,571	−5.5	727.83	2.0
Ellice – Archie	Archie; Ellice		St. Lazare	971	1,018	−4.6	1,153.33	0.8
Emerson – Franklin	Franklin	Emerson		2,439	2,457	−0.7	975.62	2.5
Ethelbert	Ethelbert		Ethelbert	629	695	−9.5	1,136.97	0.6
Gilbert Plains	Gilbert Plains	Gilbert Plains		1,623	1,594	1.8	1,051.80	1.5
Glenboro – South Cypress	South Cypress		Glenboro	1,483	1,467	1.1	1,097.76	1.4
Glenella – Lansdowne	Glenella; Lansdowne			1,245	1,267	−1.7	1,263.43	1.0
Grandview	Grandview	Grandview		1,508	1,575	−4.3	1,156.29	1.3
Grassland	Cameron; Whitewater	Hartney		1,480	1,481	−0.1	1,345.85	1.1
Grey	Grey		St. Claude	2,615	2,592	0.9	960.29	2.7
Hamiota	Hamiota	Hamiota		1,288	1,260	2.2	575.76	2.2
Harrison Park	Harrison; Park			1,799	1,815	−0.9	977.58	1.8
Hillsburg – Roblin – Shell River	Hillsburg; Shell River	Roblin		3,284	3,375	−2.7	1,688.2	1.9
Lakeshore	Ochre River; Lawrence			1,401	1,430	−2.0	1,297.23	1.1
Lorne	Lorne		Notre Dame de Lourdes; Somerset	3,006	3,024	−0.6	911.85	3.3
Louise	Louise	Pilot Mound	Crystal City	1,932	1,849	4.5	938.21	2.1
McCreary	McCreary		McCreary	948	963	−1.6	524.39	1.8
Minitonas – Bowsman	Minitonas	Minitonas	Bowsman	1,816	1,917	−5.3	1,202.31	1.5
Minto – Odanah	Minto; Odanah			1,177	1,207	−2.5	743.9	1.6
Mossey River	Mossey River		Winnipegosis	1,186	1,242	−4.5	1,125.56	1.1
Norfolk Treherne	South Norfolk	Treherne		1,741	1,816	−4.1	733.99	2.4
North Cypress – Langford	Langford; North Cypress			2,627	2,689	−2.3	1,761.87	1.5
North Norfolk	North Norfolk	MacGregor		3,762	3,663	2.7	1,160.89	3.2
Oakland – Wawanesa	Oakland		Wawanesa	1,618	1,568	3.2	577.47	2.8
Oakview	Blanshard; Saskatchewan	Rapid City		1,513	1,595	−5.1	1,148.09	1.3
Pembina	Pembina	Manitou		2,369	2,430	−2.5	1,117.7	2.1
Prairie Lakes	Strathcona; Riverside			1,423	1,536	−7.4	1,062.9	1.3
Prairie View	Birtle; Miniota	Birtle		2,167	2,232	−2.9	1,696.13	1.3
Rhineland	Rhineland	Gretna; Plum Coulee		5,772	5,469	5.5	958.69	6.0
Riding Mountain West	Shellmouth-Boulton; Silver Creek			1,390	1,404	−1.0	1,622.55	0.9
Riverdale	Daly	Rivers		2,019	2,061	−2.0	570.42	3.5
Rossburn	Rossburn	Rossburn		1,046	1,060	−1.3	682.78	1.5
Russell – Binscarth	Russell	Russell	Binscarth	2,553	2,469	3.4	572.5	4.5
Sifton	Sifton	Oak Lake		1,172	1,159	1.1	770.84	1.5
Souris – Glenwood	Glenwood	Souris		2,439	2,412	1.1	581.22	4.2
Ste. Rose	Ste. Rose	Ste. Rose du Lac		1,794	1,786	0.4	628.56	2.9
Swan Valley West	Swan River		Benito	2,923	3,144	−7.0	1,720.39	1.7
Two Borders	Albert; Arthur; Edward			1,310	1,400	−6.4	2,304.46	0.6
Wallace – Woodworth	Wallace; Woodworth		Elkhorn	2,857	2,852	0.2	1,969.32	1.5
West Interlake	Eriksdale; Siglunes			2,206	2,391	−7.7	1,622.18	1.4
WestLake – Gladstone	Lakeview; Westbourne	Gladstone		3,068	3,050	0.6	1,832.09	1.7
Yellowhead	Shoal Lake; Strathclair			1,973	2,075	−4.9	1,110.72	1.8

== See also ==
Manitoba

- List of municipalities in Manitoba
  - List of rural municipalities in Manitoba
- Amalgamation of Winnipeg
- Association of Manitoba Municipalities
- Secession from Winnipeg by the RM of Headingley

Elsewhere in Canada

- 2000–06 municipal reorganization in Quebec
- 2002–2006 municipal reorganization of Montreal
- 2023 New Brunswick local governance reform
- Amalgamation of the Halifax Regional Municipality
- Amalgamation of Toronto
- Edmonton annexations
