= Rolling River First Nation =

Rolling River First Nation Band No. 291 Ditipiinêyâ-siibiing
- People: Saulteaux-Cree
- Treaty: Treaty 4
- Headquarters: Erickson, Manitoba

Land
- Main reserve: Rolling River 67
- Other reserve(s): Rolling River 67A, 67B, and 67C; Treaty Four Reserve Grounds 77 (shared)

Population (2021)
- On reserve: 370
- On other land: 10
- Off reserve: 780
- Total population: 1160

Tribal Council
- West Region Tribal Council

The Rolling River First Nation (Saulteaux)(Cree) (Saulteaux-Cree people) Ditipinêyâ-siibiing is a Saulteaux-Cree First Nations community in Manitoba, located south of Riding Mountain National Park.

== Reserve lands ==
Rolling River First Nation is in possession of three reserves:

- Rolling River 67 (50°27′28″N 99°59′32″W) — the main reserve, with a total size of 6,776.10 ha (16,744.1 acres). It is located 64 km (40 mi) north of Brandon. Bordered mostly by the RM of Harrison, it also has a significant border with the RM of Clanwilliam, as well as a much smaller border with the RM of Minto.
- Rolling River 67A (50°38′27″N 99°51′27″W) — has a total size of 1,017.60 ha (2,514.5 acres)
- Rolling River 67B (50°27′55″N 99°54′48″W) — has a total size of 297.10 ha (734.2 acres)
- Rolling River 67C (49°53′10″N 97°20′40″W) — has a total size of 31.40 ha (77.6 acres)
- Treaty Four Reserve Grounds 77 — a reserve shared with several other First Nations; it has a total size of 99.20 ha (245.1 acres)
