= List of rural municipalities in Manitoba =

Rural municipalities of Manitoba
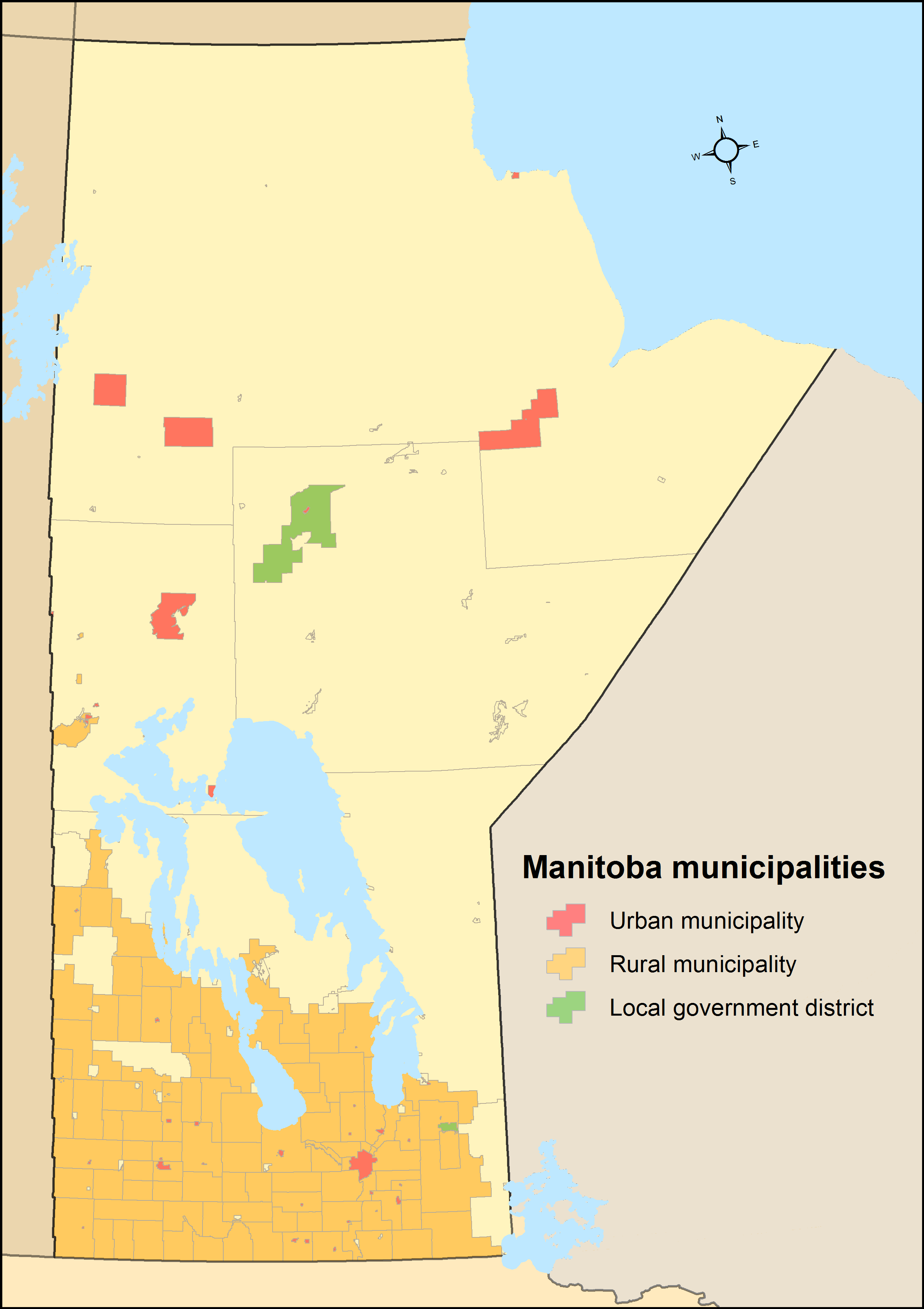
- Distribution of Manitoba's 98 rural municipalities following the 2015 amalgamations.
- Location: Province of Manitoba
- Number: 98
- Populations: 648 (Ethelbert) – 17,216 (Hanover)
- Areas: 20.26 km^{2} (Victoria Beach) – 3,572.13 km^{2} (Reynolds)
- Government: Rural municipality
- Subdivisions: Unincorporated communities

A rural municipality (RM) is a type of incorporated municipality in the Canadian province of Manitoba. Under the province's Municipal Act of 1997, an area must have a minimum population of 1,000 and a density of less than 400 inhabitants per square kilometre (1,000/sq mi) to incorporate as a rural municipality. Manitoba has 98 RMs, which had a cumulative population of 301,438 as of the 2016 Census. This is a decrease from 116 RMs prior to January 1, 2015, when municipalities with less than 1,000 people were directed by the provincial government to amalgamate with adjoining municipalities to comply with the Municipal Act.

The most and least populated RMs as of the 2016 census are Hanover and Victoria Beach with populations of 15,733 and 398 respectively. East St. Paul is the most densely populated RM at 223.2/km^{2} (578/sq mi) The largest and smallest RMs in terms of geography are Reynolds and Victoria Beach with land areas of 3,572.13 km^{2} (1,379.21 mi^{2}) and 20.26 km^{2} (7.82 mi^{2}) respectively.

== List ==
Rural municipality (RM)	Administrative seat	Incorporation date	2016 Census of Population				
Rural municipality (RM)	Administrative seat	Incorporation date	Population (2021)	Population (2016)	Change	Land area (km^{2})	Population density
Alexander	St-Georges	January 1, 1945	3,854	3,333	+15.6%	1,560.05	2.5/km^{2}
Alonsa	Alonsa	January 1, 1945	1,210	1,247	−3.0%	3,006.17	0.4/km^{2}
Argyle	Baldur	August 15, 1881	994	1,025	−3.0%	768.63	1.3/km^{2}
Armstrong	Inwood	January 1, 1945	1,967	1,792	+9.8%	1,868.24	1.1/km^{2}
Bifrost – Riverton	Arborg*	January 1, 2015	3,320	3,378	−1.7%	1,643.14	2.0/km^{2}
Boissevain – Morton	Boissevain	January 1, 2015	2,309	2,353	−1.9%	1,102.38	2.1/km^{2}
Brenda – Waskada	Waskada	January 1, 2015	650	674	−3.6%	775.64	0.8/km^{2}
Brokenhead	Beausejour*	November 15, 1900	5,414	5,122	+5.7%	749.69	7.2/km^{2}
Cartier	Elie	February 21, 1914	3,344	3,368	−0.7%	552.94	6.0/km^{2}
Cartwright – Roblin	Cartwright	January 1, 2015	1,336	1,308	+2.1%	705.27	1.9/km^{2}
Clanwilliam – Erickson	Erickson	January 1, 2015	1,012	860	+17.7%	358.05	2.8/km^{2}
Coldwell	Lundar	November 19, 1912	1,313	1,254	+4.7%	891.85	1.5/km^{2}
Cornwallis	Brandon*	December 22, 1883	4,568	4,520	+1.1%	500.51	9.1/km^{2}
Dauphin	Dauphin*	November 26, 1897	2,136	2,298	−7.0%	1,512.79	1.4/km^{2}
Deloraine – Winchester	Deloraine	January 1, 2015	1,478	1,489	−0.7%	728.13	2.0/km^{2}
De Salaberry	St-Pierre-Jolys*	December 22, 1883	3,918	3,580	+9.4%	667.57	5.9/km^{2}
Dufferin	Carman*	November 1, 1890	2,543	2,435	+4.4%	916.11	2.8/km^{2}
East St. Paul	East St. Paul	November 3, 1915	9,725	9,372	+3.8%	41.79	232.7/km^{2}
Ellice – Archie	McAulay	January 1, 2015	831	887	−6.3%	1,153.14	0.7/km^{2}
Elton	Forrest	December 22, 1883	1,276	1,273	+0.2%	576.14	2.2/km^{2}
Emerson – Franklin	Dominion City	January 1, 2015	2,437	2,537	−3.9%	970.19	2.5/km^{2}
Ethelbert	Ethelbert	January 1, 2015	648	607	+6.8%	1,134.59	0.6/km^{2}
Fisher	Fisher Branch	January 1, 1945	1,845	1,827	+1.0%	1,486.17	1.2/km^{2}
Gilbert Plains	Gilbert Plains	January 1, 2015	1,420	1,470	−3.4%	1,050.15	1.4/km^{2}
Gimli	Gimli	August 15, 1881	6,569	6,181	+6.3%	318.10	20.7/km^{2}
Glenboro – South Cypress	Glenboro	January 1, 2015	1,123	1,550	−27.5%	1,071.64	1.0/km^{2}
Glenella – Lansdowne	Glenella	January 1, 2015	1,133	1,181	−4.1%	1,274.74	0.9/km^{2}
Grahamdale	Moosehorn	January 1, 1945	1,278	1,334	−4.2%	2,365.94	0.5/km^{2}
Grandview	Grandview	January 1, 2015	1,419	1,482	−4.3%	1,147.99	1.2/km^{2}
Grassland	Hartney	January 1, 2015	1,583	1,561	+1.4%	1,350.34	1.2/km^{2}
Grey	Elm Creek	January 1, 2015	2,517	2,648	−4.9%	968.90	2.6/km^{2}
Hamiota	Hamiota	January 1, 2015	1,234	1,225	+0.7%	577.68	2.1/km^{2}
Hanover	Mitchell	May 25, 1881	17,216	15,540	+10.8%	730.44	23.6/km^{2}
Harrison Park	Onanole	January 1, 2015	1,852	1,617	+14.5%	964.55	1.9/km^{2}
Headingley	Headingley	May 9, 1992	4,331	3,579	+21.0%	107.53	40.3/km^{2}
Kelsey	The Pas*	January 1, 1945	2,181	2,419	−9.8%	850.41	2.6/km^{2}
Killarney-Turtle Mountain	Killarney	August 15, 1881	3,520	3,429	+2.7%	930.02	3.8/km^{2}
La Broquerie	La Broquerie	May 25, 1881	6,725	6,076	+10.7%	578.97	11.6/km^{2}
Lac du Bonnet	Lac du Bonnet*	April 6, 1912	3,563	3,121	+14.2%	1,097.61	3.2/km^{2}
Lakeshore	Rorketon	January 1, 2015	1,186	1,363	−13.0%	1,295.64	0.9/km^{2}
Lorne	Somerset	January 1, 2015	2,904	3,041	−4.5%	923.03	3.1/km^{2}
Louise	Crystal City	January 1, 2015	2,025	1,918	+5.6%	934.81	2.2/km^{2}
Macdonald	Sanford	May 25, 1881	8,120	7,162	+13.4%	1,156.11	7.0/km^{2}
McCreary	McCreary	January 1, 2015	748	892	−16.1%	527.77	1.4/km^{2}
Minitonas – Bowsman	Minitonas	January 1, 2015	1,587	1,653	−4.0%	1,199.17	1.3/km^{2}
Minto – Odanah	Minnedosa*	January 1, 2015	1,121	1,189	−5.7%	746.31	1.5/km^{2}
Montcalm	Letellier	May 25, 1881	1,278	1,260	+1.4%	468.25	2.7/km^{2}
Morris	Morris*	February 14, 1880	3,049	3,047	+0.1%	1,035.32	2.9/km^{2}
Mossey River	Winnipegosis	January 1, 2015	1,450	1,145	+26.6%	1,119.96	1.3/km^{2}
Mountain	Birch River	January 1, 1945	980	978	+0.2%	2,603.43	0.4/km^{2}
Norfolk Treherne	Treherne	January 1, 2015	1,770	1,770	0.0%	737.90	2.4/km^{2}
North Cypress – Langford	Carberry*	January 1, 2015	3,011	2,745	+9.7%	1,762.30	1.7/km^{2}
North Norfolk	MacGregor	January 1, 2015	3,915	3,853	+1.6%	1,158.26	3.4/km^{2}
Oakland – Wawanesa	Nesbitt	January 1, 2015	1,758	1,690	+4.0%	578.82	3.0/km^{2}
Oakview	Oak River	January 1, 2015	1,928	1,626	+18.6%	1,141.98	1.7/km^{2}
Pembina	Manitou	January 1, 2015	2,406	2,347	+2.5%	1,130.57	2.1/km^{2}
Piney	Vassar	January 1, 1945	1,843	1,726	+6.8%	2,430.32	0.8/km^{2}
Pipestone	Reston	December 22, 1883	1,422	1,458	−2.5%	1,149.86	1.2/km^{2}
Portage la Prairie	Portage la Prairie*	February 14, 1880	6,888	6,975	−1.2%	1,973.45	3.5/km^{2}
Prairie Lakes	Belmont	January 1, 2015	1,625	1,453	+11.8%	1,070.95	1.5/km^{2}
Prairie View	Birtle	January 1, 2015	2,161	2,088	+3.5%	1,694.69	1.3/km^{2}
Reynolds	Hadashville	January 1, 1945	1,344	1,338	+0.4%	3,559.65	0.4/km^{2}
Rhineland	Altona*	January 1, 2015	5,819	5,945	−2.1%	958.48	6.1/km^{2}
Riding Mountain West	Inglis	January 1, 2015	1,442	1,420	+1.5%	1,624.99	0.9/km^{2}
Ritchot	St. Adolphe	November 1, 1890	7,469	6,679	+11.8%	332.23	22.5/km^{2}
Riverdale	Rivers	January 1, 2015	1,803	2,133	−15.5%	576.02	3.1/km^{2}
Roblin (Note: The Municipality of Roblin was incorporated as the Municipality of Hillsburg – Roblin – Shell River on January 1, 2015. The name was changed to Municipality of Roblin on March 30, 2015)	Roblin	January 1, 2015	3,089	3,214	−3.9%	1,694.95	1.8/km^{2}
Rockwood	Stonewall*	February 14, 1880	8,440	7,823	+7.9%	1,184.89	7.1/km^{2}
Roland	Roland	November 1, 1908	1,145	1,058	+8.2%	484.47	2.4/km^{2}
Rosedale	Neepawa*	December 22, 1883	1,524	1,672	−8.9%	864.68	1.8/km^{2}
Rossburn	Rossburn	January 1, 2015	973	976	−0.3%	672.29	1.4/km^{2}
Rosser	Rosser	March 11, 1893	1,270	1,372	−7.4%	441.74	2.9/km^{2}
Russell – Binscarth	Russell	January 1, 2015	2,596	2,442	+6.3%	569.70	4.6/km^{2}
Sifton	Oak Lake	January 1, 2015	1,239	1,256	−1.4%	839.50	1.5/km^{2}
Souris – Glenwood	Souris	January 1, 2015	2,547	2,562	−0.6%	579.69	4.4/km^{2}
Springfield	Oakbank	September 27, 1873	16,142	15,342	+5.2%	1,096.17	14.7/km^{2}
St. Andrews	Clandeboye	February 14, 1880	11,723	11,913	−1.6%	739.61	15.9/km^{2}
St. Clements	East Selkirk	December 22, 1883	11,586	10,876	+6.5%	711.17	16.3/km^{2}
St. François Xavier	St. François Xavier	February 14, 1880	1,449	1,411	+2.7%	205.14	7.1/km^{2}
St. Laurent	St. Laurent	May 25, 1881	1,542	1,338	+15.2%	480.15	3.2/km^{2}
Stanley	Stanley	November 1, 1890	8,981	8,969	+0.1%	835.18	10.8/km^{2}
Ste. Anne	Ste. Anne*	February 14, 1880	5,584	5,003	+11.6%	476.81	11.7/km^{2}
Ste. Rose	Ste. Rose du Lac	January 1, 2015	1,591	1,712	−7.1%	630.04	2.5/km^{2}
Stuartburn	Vita	January 1, 1945	1,731	1,648	+5.0%	1,161.45	1.5/km^{2}
Swan Valley West	Swan River*	January 1, 2015	2,759	2,829	−2.5%	1,716.84	1.6/km^{2}
Taché	Dufresne	February 14, 1880	11,916	11,568	+3.0%	580.64	20.5/km^{2}
Thompson	Miami	November 1, 1908	1,518	1,422	+6.8%	531.24	2.9/km^{2}
Two Borders	Melita*	January 1, 2015	1,120	1,175	−4.7%	2,321.73	0.5/km^{2}
Victoria	Holland	November 15, 1902	1,188	1,132	+4.9%	703.54	1.7/km^{2}
Victoria Beach	Winnipeg*	March 14, 1919	689	398	+73.1%	20.71	33.3/km^{2}
Wallace – Woodworth	Virden*	January 1, 2015	2,748	2,948	−6.8%	1,977.43	1.4/km^{2}
West Interlake	Eriksdale	January 1, 2015	2,228	2,162	+3.1%	1,643.72	1.4/km^{2}
WestLake – Gladstone	Gladstone	January 1, 2015	3,273	3,154	+3.8%	1,909.82	1.7/km^{2}
West St. Paul	West St. Paul	November 3, 1915	6,682	5,368	+24.5%	87.49	76.4/km^{2}
Whitehead	Alexander	December 22, 1883	1,679	1,651	+1.7%	577.60	2.9/km^{2}
Whitemouth	Whitemouth	March 1, 1905	1,630	1,548	+5.3%	697.35	2.3/km^{2}
Woodlands	Woodlands	February 14, 1880	3,797	3,416	+11.2%	1,197.59	3.2/km^{2}
Yellowhead	Shoal Lake	January 1, 2015	1,841	1,948	−5.5%	1,093.17	1.7/km^{2}
Total rural municipalities	—	—	301,438	288,919	+4.3%	101,551.07	3.0/km^{2}

Notes

- *Municipal or administrative offices are located in an adjacent independent city, town or village that is outside the jurisdiction of the rural municipality.

== Former rural municipalities ==
Name	Dissolved (Note: The Manitoba government amalgamated 65 rural municipalities, 25 towns, and 17 villages into 47 municipalities on January 1, 2015 in order to bring these municipalities into compliance with the minimum population requirements of the Municipal Act.)	Succeeded by
Albert, RM of	January 1, 2015	Municipality of Two Borders
Archie, RM of	January 1, 2015	RM of Ellice – Archie
Arthur, RM of	January 1, 2015	Municipality of Two Borders
Assiniboia, RM of	January 1, 1969	City of St. James–Assiniboia (Note: The City of St. James–Assiniboia ceased to exist on January 1, 1972; now part of the City of Winnipeg.) (Note: The RMs of Charleswood, Fort Garry, North Kildonan, and Old Kildonan, and seven urban municipalities were amalgamated with the City of Winnipeg on January 1, 1972.)
Bifrost, RM of	January 1, 2015	Municipality of Bifrost – Riverton
Birtle, RM of	January 1, 2015	Prairie View Municipality
Blanshard, RM of	January 1, 2015	RM of Oakview
Brooklands, RM of	January 1, 1967	City of St. James (Note: The City of St. James became the City of St. James–Assiniboia in 1969 and ceased to exist on January 1, 1972; now part of the City of Winnipeg.)
Boulton, RM of	January 1, 1999	RM of Shellmouth-Boulton (Note: The RM of Shellmouth-Boulton ceased to exist on January 1, 2015; succeeded by the RM of Riding Mountain West.)
Brenda, RM of	January 1, 2015	Municipality of Brenda – Waskada
Cameron, RM of	January 1, 2015	Municipality of Grassland
Charleswood, RM of	January 1, 1972	City of Winnipeg
Clanwilliam, RM of	January 1, 2015	Municipality of Clanwilliam – Erickson
Daly, RM of	January 1, 2015	Riverdale Municipality
Douglas, RM of	January 1, 1891	RM of Rhineland (Note: The RM of Rhineland ceased to exist on January 1, 2015; succeeded by the Municipality of Rhineland.)
East Kildonan, RM of	January 1, 1957	City of East Kildonan and RM of North Kildonan (Note: The City of East Kildonan ceased to exist on January 1, 1972, now part of the City of Winnipeg.)
Edward, RM of	January 1, 2015	Municipality of Two Borders
Ellice, RM of	January 1, 2015	RM of Ellice – Archie
Eriksdale, RM of	January 1, 2015	Municipality of West Interlake
Ethelbert, RM of	January 1, 2015	Municipality of Ethelbert
Fort Garry, RM of	January 1, 1972	City of Winnipeg
Franklin, RM of	January 1, 2015	Municipality of Emerson – Franklin
Gilbert Plains, RM of	January 1, 2015	Gilbert Plains Municipality
Glenella, RM of	January 1, 2015	Municipality of Glenella – Lansdowne
Glenwood, RM of	January 1, 2015	Municipality of Souris – Glenwood
Grandview, RM of	January 1, 2015	Grandview Municipality
Hamiota, RM of	January 1, 2015	Hamiota Municipality
Harrison, RM of	January 1, 2015	Municipality of Harrison Park
Hespeler, RM of	January 1, 1891	RM of Hanover
Hillsburg, RM of	January 1, 2015	Municipality of Hillsburg – Roblin – Shell River
Kildonan, RM of	January 1, 1914	RMs of East Kildonan and West Kildonan (Note: The RMs of East and West Kildonan later became cities which ceased to exist on January 1, 1972; now part of the City of Winnipeg.)
Lakeview, RM of	January 1, 2015	Municipality of WestLake – Gladstone
Langford, RM of	January 1, 2015	Municipality of North Cypress – Langford
Lansdowne, RM of	January 1, 2015	Municipality of Glenella – Lansdowne
Lawrence, RM of	January 1, 2015	RM of Lakeshore
Lorne, RM of	January 1, 2015	Municipality of Lorne
Louise, RM of	January 1, 2015	Municipality of Louise
McCreary, RM of	January 1, 2015	Municipality of McCreary
Miniota, RM of	January 1, 2015	Prairie View Municipality
Minitonas, RM of	January 1, 2015	Municipality of Minitonas – Bowsman
Minto, RM of	January 1, 2015	RM of Minto-Odanah
Morton, RM of	January 1, 2015	Municipality of Boissevain – Morton
North Cypress, RM of	January 1, 2015	Municipality of North Cypress – Langford
North Kildonan, RM of	January 1, 1972	City of Winnipeg
North Norfolk, RM of	January 1, 2015	Municipality of North Norfolk
Oakland, RM of	January 1, 2015	Municipality of Oakland – Wawanesa
Ochre River, RM of	January 1, 2015	RM of Lakeshore
Odanah, RM of	January 1, 2015	RM of Minto-Odanah
Old Kildonan, RM of	January 1, 1972	City of Winnipeg
Park, RM of	January 1, 2015	Municipality of Harrison Park
Pembina, RM of	January 1, 2015	Municipality of Pembina
Rhineland, RM of	January 1, 2015	Municipality of Rhineland
Riverside, RM of	January 1, 2015	RM of Prairie Lakes
Roblin, RM of	January 1, 2015	Cartwright – Roblin Municipality
Rossburn, RM of	January 1, 2015	Rossburn Municipality
Russell, RM of	January 1, 2015	Municipality of Russell – Binscarth
Saskatchewan, RM of	January 1, 2015	RM of Oakview
Shell River, RM of	January 1, 2015	Municipality of Hillsburg – Roblin – Shell River
Shellmouth, RM of	January 1, 1999	RM of Shellmouth-Boulton
Shellmouth-Boulton, RM of	January 1, 2015	RM of Riding Mountain West
Shoal Lake, Municipality of	January 1, 2015	RM of Yellowhead
Shoal Lake, RM of	January 1, 2011	Municipality of Shoal Lake (Note: The Municipality of Shoal Lake ceased to exist on January 1, 2015; succeeded by the RM of Yellowhead.)
Siglunes, RM of	January 1, 2015	Municipality of West Interlake
Silver Creek, RM of	January 1, 2015	RM of Riding Mountain West
South Cypress, RM of	January 1, 2015	Municipality of Glenboro – South Cypress
South Norfolk, RM of	January 1, 2015	Municipality of Norfolk Treherne
Ste. Rose, RM of	January 1, 2015	Municipality of Ste. Rose
St. James, RM of	January 1, 1956	City of St. James
St. Vital, RM of	January 1, 1962	City of St. Vital (Note: The Town of West Kildonan became a city in 1961; ceased to exist on January 1, 1972; now part of the City of Winnipeg.) (Note: The City of St. Vital ceased to exist on January 1, 1972; now part of the City of Winnipeg.)
Strathclair, RM of	January 1, 2015	RM of Yellowhead
Strathcona, RM of	January 1, 2015	RM of Prairie Lakes
Swan River, RM of	January 1, 2015	Municipality of Swan Valley West
Turtle Mountain, RM of	January 1, 2015	Municipality of Killarney-Turtle Mountain
Wallace, RM of	January 1, 2015	RM of Wallace – Woodworth
Westbourne, RM of	January 1, 2015	Municipality of WestLake – Gladstone
West Kildonan, RM of	January 1, 1921	Town of West Kildonan
Whitewater, RM of	January 1, 2015	Municipality of Grassland
Winchester, RM of	January 1, 2015	Municipality of Deloraine – Winchester
Woodworth, RM of	January 1, 2015	RM of Wallace – Woodworth

== See also ==
- List of local urban districts in Manitoba
- List of communities in Manitoba
- List of ghost towns in Manitoba
- List of municipalities in Manitoba
  - List of cities in Manitoba
  - List of towns in Manitoba
  - List of villages in Manitoba
- Amalgamation of Winnipeg
- Manitoba municipal amalgamations, 2015
- List of rural municipalities in Saskatchewan
