= Rural Municipality of Grandview =

Rural municipality in Manitoba, Canada

Coordinates: 51°09′18″N 100°47′21″W

The Rural Municipality of Grandview is a former rural municipality (RM) in the Canadian province of Manitoba. It was originally incorporated as a rural municipality on June 1, 1901. It ceased on January 1, 2015 as a result of its provincially mandated amalgamation with the Town of Grandview to form the Grandview Municipality.

The Valley River 63A Indian reserve lied at the RM's west side, while part of Duck Mountain Provincial Forest occupied its northwestern sector, and part of Riding Mountain National Park occupied its southernmost sector.

== Communities ==
- Meharry
