= Rural Municipality of Ochre River =

Rural municipality in Manitoba, Canada

Coordinates: 51°01′20″N 99°41′58″W

The Rural Municipality of Ochre River is a former rural municipality (RM) in the Canadian province of Manitoba. It was originally incorporated as a rural municipality on November 18, 1901. It ceased on January 1, 2015 as a result of its provincially mandated amalgamation with the RM of Lawrence to form the Rural Municipality of Lakeshore.

The former RM as located south of Dauphin Lake and took its name from the river and the community of Ochre River.

== Communities ==
- Makinak
- Ochre River
