= Grandview Cemetery =

Grandview Cemetery may refer to several cemeteries in the United States:

- Grandview Cemetery (Chillicothe, Ohio)
- Grandview Cemetery, Fort Collins, Colorado
- Grandview Cemetery, Johnstown, Pennsylvania
- Grand View Burial Park, Hannibal, Missouri
- Grand View Memorial Park Cemetery, Glendale, California

== See also ==
- Grandview (disambiguation)
