= Rural Municipality of Hillsburg =

Rural municipality in Manitoba, Canada

Coordinates: 51°17′13″N 101°07′04″W

The Rural Municipality of Hillsburg is a former rural municipality (RM) in the Canadian province of Manitoba. It was originally incorporated as a rural municipality on November 19, 1912. It ceased on January 1, 2015, as a result of its provincially mandated amalgamation with the RM of Shell River and the Town of Roblin to form the Municipality of Hillsburg – Roblin – Shell River.

The Valley River 63A Indian reserve lied on its east side. About 30 percent of the former RM lied within Duck Mountain Provincial Forest.

== Communities ==
- Bield
- Merridale
- Shevlin
- Shortdale
