= Rural Municipality of Langford =

Rural municipality in Manitoba, Canada

Coordinates: 50°09′06″N 99°27′16″W

The Rural Municipality of Langford is a former rural municipality (RM) in the Canadian province of Manitoba. It was originally incorporated as a rural municipality on November 1, 1890. It ceased on January 1, 2015 as a result of its provincially mandated amalgamation with the RM of North Cypress to form the Municipality of North Cypress – Langford.

The former RM surrounded the separately administered Town of Neepawa.

== Communities ==
- Hallboro
- Mentmore
