= Rural Municipality of Blanshard =

Rural municipality in Manitoba, Canada

Coordinates: 50°11′47″N 100°21′30″W

The Rural Municipality of Blanshard is a former rural municipality (RM) in the Canadian province of Manitoba. It was originally incorporated as a rural municipality on December 22, 1883. It ceased on January 1, 2015 as a result of its provincially mandated amalgamation with the RM of Saskatchewan and the Town of Rapid City to form the Rural Municipality of Oakview.

It was located northwest of the city of Brandon.

== Communities ==
- Brumlie
- Cardale
- Norman
- Oak River
