= Binscarth =

- Unincorporated urban community
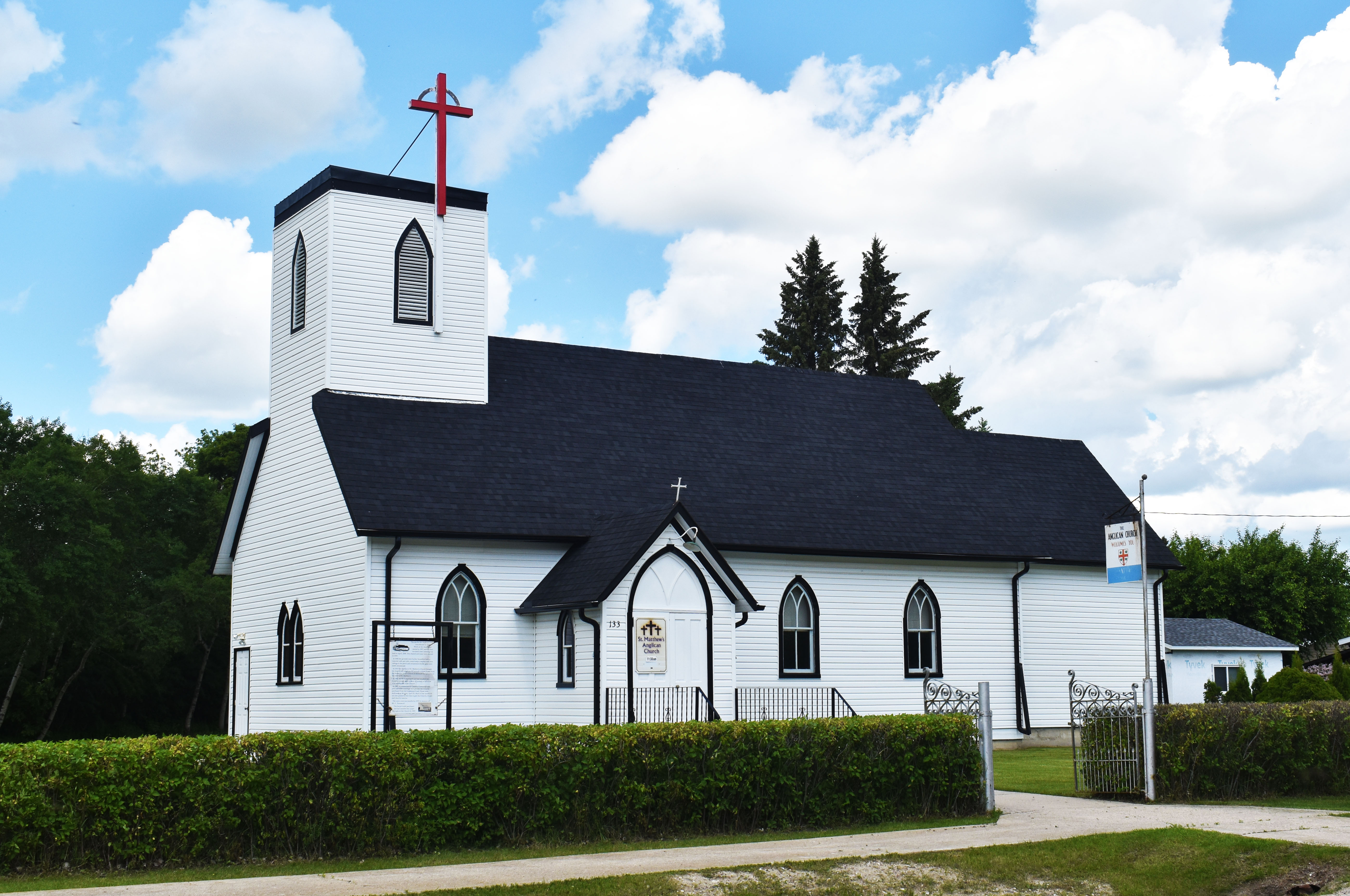
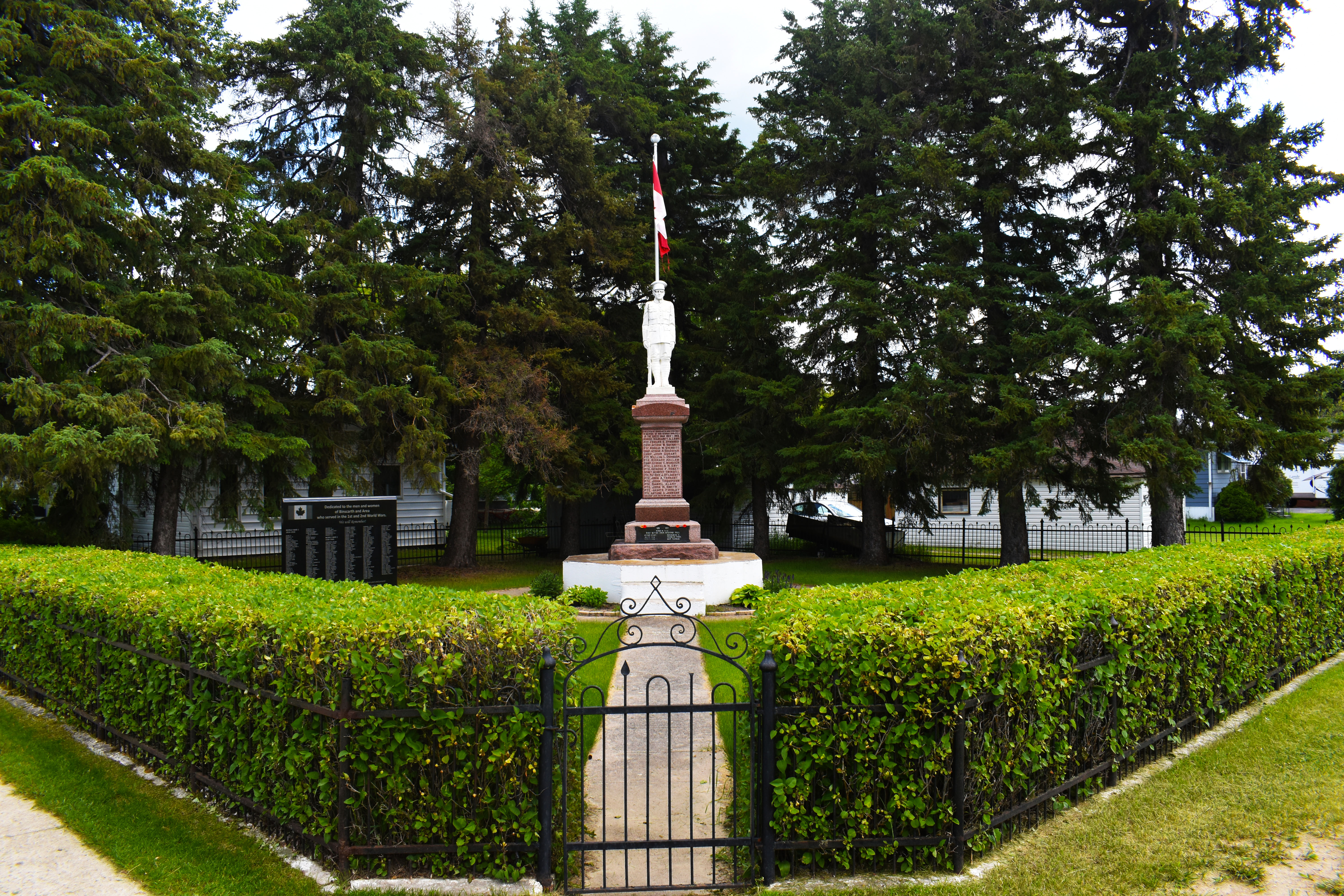
- St. Matthew's Anglican Church in Binscarth. The Binscarth war memorial.

- Location of Binscarth in Manitoba
- Coordinates: 50.3736°N 101.1658°W
- Country: Canada
- Province: Manitoba
- Municipality: Russell – Binscarth

Population (2011)
  - Total: 425

Binscarth is an unincorporated urban community in the Municipality of Russell – Binscarth, Manitoba. It is located approximately 167 km (104 mi) northwest of Brandon, 16 km (9.9 mi) south from Russell, and 16 km (10 mi) east of the Saskatchewan border.

Prior to 1 January 2015, it was designated as a village.

The economic base of Binscarth and area is a mix of agriculture and service businesses. Major industrial employers in the area include three potash mines nearby in Saskatchewan (Nutrien in Rocanville, and Mosaic K1 in Esterhazy and K2 in Gerald) and a canola crushing plant (Bunge) at Harrowby Manitoba.

== History ==
The community was originally formed around a stock farm established by the Scottish Ontario and Manitoba Land Company some three miles northwest of the current townsite. It was named after the Company founder's ancestral home in the Orkney islands. When the Manitoba and Northwestern Railway (later CPR) was built through the area in 1886, the railway station was established at the current site of SE15-19-28W, and the community soon relocated itself there, incorporating as a village in 1917.

In 2015, Binscarth amalgamated with the town of Russell and the Rural Municipality of Russell to form the Municipality of Russell-Binscarth.

=== Seekaywye ===
In 1964, Binscarth residents narrowly defeated (by ten votes) a proposal to rename itself Seekaywye, after the Winnipeg radio station CKY. If successful, the station would have promoted Binscarth/Seekaywye as a vacation resort. CKY also offered the same deal to La Riviere, Manitoba, who also said no.

For many years, the radio frequency of CKY 580 was remembered in local business names the 580 Hotel and 580 Plumbing and Heating.

== Demographics ==
In the 2021 Census of Population conducted by Statistics Canada, Binscarth had a population of 420 living in 199 of its 213 total private dwellings, a change of 3.2% from its 2016 population of 407. With a land area of 1.4 km^{2} (0.54 sq mi), it had a population density of 300.0/km^{2} (777.0/sq mi) in 2021.

== Attractions ==
The Binscarth & District Gordon Orr Memorial Museum has a large collection of Native artifacts. The museum is also one of only a handful of museums to exhibit an extinct bison skull. Also on display is a Massey-Harris tractor, a binder, a seed drill, and a 6-horsepower International Engine dating from 1905. There is also a general store, summer kitchen, chapel, and school room. The museum is open in July and August.

Binscarth is home to the "largest outdoor swimming pool on the Yellowhead highway." The pool, park and campground are located just south of the community in the Silver Creek valley.

== Climate ==
Climate data for Binscarth
Month	Jan	Feb	Mar	Apr	May	Jun	Jul	Aug	Sep	Oct	Nov	Dec	Year
Record high °C (°F)	6 (43)	12 (54)	21 (70)	34 (93)	37.5 (99.5)	38.5 (101.3)	37 (99)	37.5 (99.5)	36 (97)	32 (90)	21.1 (70.0)	11 (52)	38.5 (101.3)
Mean daily maximum °C (°F)	−12.7 (9.1)	−8.3 (17.1)	−1.8 (28.8)	9.3 (48.7)	17.8 (64.0)	22.1 (71.8)	24.7 (76.5)	23.9 (75.0)	17.4 (63.3)	10.1 (50.2)	−2 (28)	−10.2 (13.6)	7.5 (45.5)
Daily mean °C (°F)	−17.7 (0.1)	−13.4 (7.9)	−6.8 (19.8)	3.2 (37.8)	11 (52)	15.5 (59.9)	18 (64)	16.9 (62.4)	11 (52)	4.3 (39.7)	−6.4 (20.5)	−14.8 (5.4)	1.7 (35.1)
Mean daily minimum °C (°F)	−24 (−11)	−20.1 (−4.2)	−11.9 (10.6)	−2.5 (27.5)	4.5 (40.1)	10.1 (50.2)	12.4 (54.3)	11.1 (52.0)	5.9 (42.6)	−0.2 (31.6)	−9.6 (14.7)	−20.5 (−4.9)	−3.7 (25.3)
Record low °C (°F)	−43 (−45)	−42.5 (−44.5)	−36.1 (−33.0)	−25.5 (−13.9)	−14 (7)	−2 (28)	0 (32)	−4 (25)	−9 (16)	−23 (−9)	−36 (−33)	−44 (−47)	−44 (−47)
Average precipitation mm (inches)	24.7 (0.97)	19.1 (0.75)	27.5 (1.08)	24.8 (0.98)	52.5 (2.07)	79.5 (3.13)	73.1 (2.88)	70.6 (2.78)	54.9 (2.16)	30.6 (1.20)	20.7 (0.81)	23.2 (0.91)	501 (19.7)
Source: Environment Canada
