= Rural Municipality of McCreary =

Rural municipality in Manitoba, Canada

Coordinates: 50°44′58″N 99°29′06″W

The Rural Municipality of McCreary is a former rural municipality (RM) in the Canadian province of Manitoba. It was originally incorporated as a rural municipality on May 1, 1909. It ceased on January 1, 2015, as a result of its provincially mandated amalgamation with the Village of McCreary to form the Municipality of McCreary.

== Communities ==
- Glencairn
- Norgate
- Reeve
