= Inglis Grain Elevators National Historic Site =

National historic site in Inglis, Manitoba, Canada

Coordinates: 50°56′39″N 101°14′57″W

Inglis elevator row
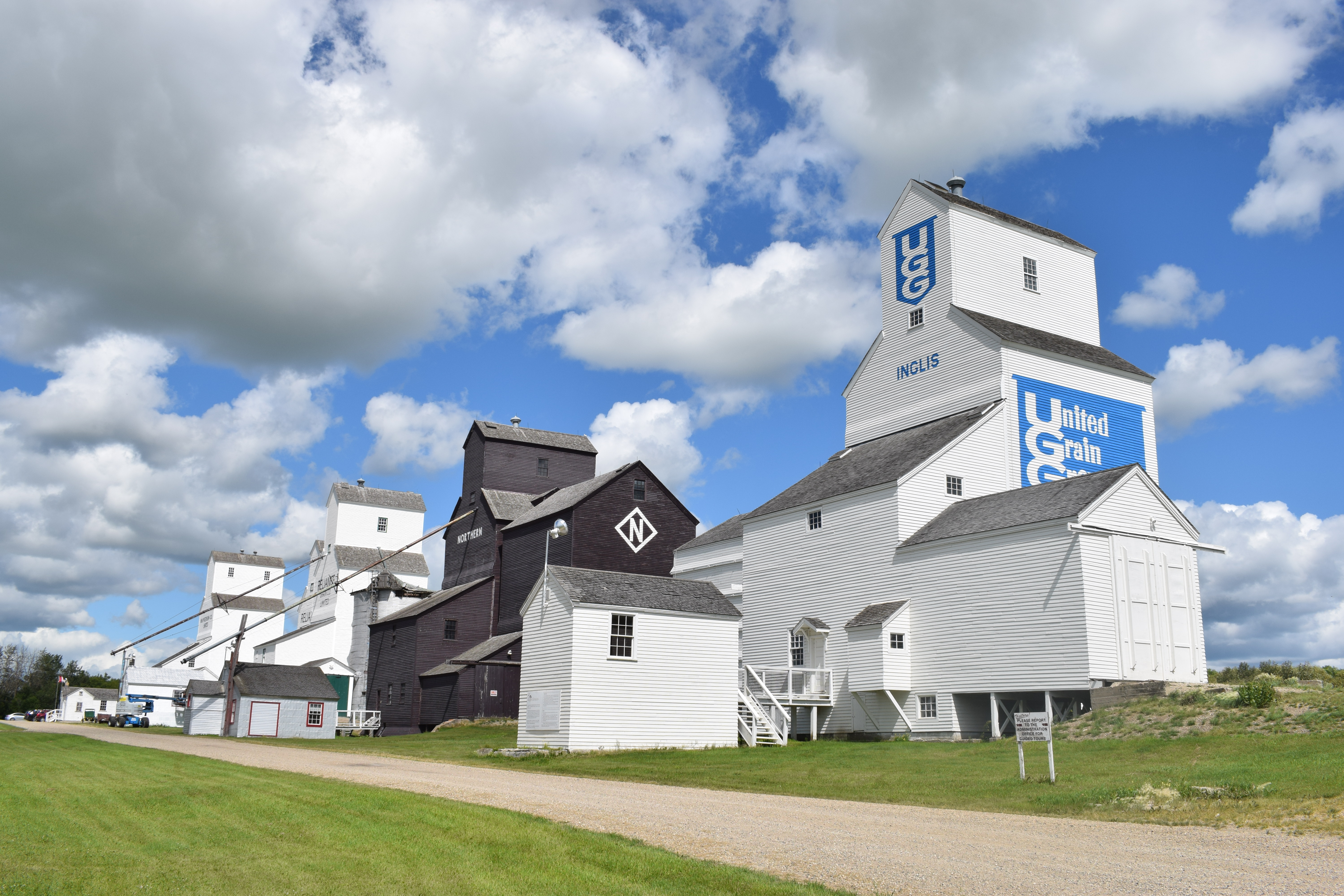
- Inglis elevators, located on the southeast edge of the village.
- Type: Grain elevator row
- Location: Village of Inglis, Manitoba, Canada
- Nearest city: Shelmouth-Boulton
- Built: 1922–1941
- Architectural styles: Wood-crib elevators, industrial
- Governing body: Village of Inglis-Town Council
- Website: Inglis Grain Elevators

National Historic Site of Canada
- Designated: 1996

The Inglis elevator row is a row of five wooden grain elevators located alongside the former Canadian Pacific Railway track bed, in the village of Inglis, Manitoba, Canada. Because so many traditional country elevators have been demolished throughout Western Canada, the Inglis elevator row preserves rare examples of a formerly common sight from "the golden age of grain". In recognition of the elevators in Inglis being the last elevator row in Canada, they have been fully restored and protected as a National Historic Site of Canada.

== History and significance ==
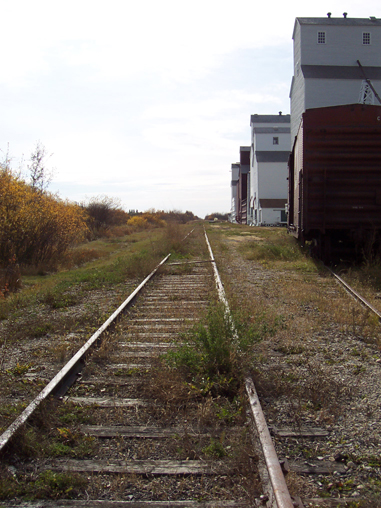
Looking down the tracks.

The arrival of the railroad in the smaller communities of Manitoba offered both risk and reward for villages. When the railroad reached Inglis in 1922, allowing grain from the area to reach distant markets, the nearby town of Asessippi was quickly abandoned. By the end of 1922, four of the five elevators in Inglis were already built, quickly followed by a number of shops and businesses. The Inglis row consists of five wood-crib elevators:

- N. M. Paterson Company elevator, built in 1922 using then-state of the art dust control systems.
- Reliance elevators, built by Matheson-Lindsay in 1922 as a single elevator. The elevator was then taken over by Province Elevator Co. later becoming Reliance Elevators in the 1930s. By 1941 a new "twin" elevator was added for more space. Manitoba Pool bought the elevators in 1952 and lastly sold to United Grain Growers in 1971. The elevators have since been fully restored back to their original signage as Reliance elevators.
- United grain growers elevator, originally built by United Grain Growers in 1922 but replaced after it was destroyed by fire in 1925. Annexes were added 1949.
- National elevator, built by the Northern Elevator Co. in 1922 later taken over by National in the 1940s and then Cargill and last Paterson Grain in 1979. The elevator has been completely restored as a gift shop.

With the loss of wooden grain elevators across western Canada, the "Five Prairie Giants" of Inglis have become a popular tourist destination and were named one of Manitoba's top ten architectural icons.

== See also ==
- Grain elevator
