= Rural Municipality of Saskatchewan =

Rural municipality in Manitoba, Canada

Coordinates: 50°11′47″N 100°04′59″W

The Rural Municipality of Saskatchewan is a former rural municipality (RM) in the Canadian province of Manitoba. It was originally incorporated as a rural municipality on December 22, 1883. It ceased on January 1, 2015 as a result of its provincially mandated amalgamation with the RM of Blanshard and the Town of Rapid City to form the Rural Municipality of Oakview.

== Communities ==
- Basswood
- Riverdale
