= Municipality of North Cypress-Langford =

Rural municipality in Manitoba, Canada

North Cypress – Langford
- Rural municipality
- Municipality of North Cypress – Langford
- Location of the Municipality of North Cypress-Langford in Manitoba
- Coordinates: 50.073°N 99.435°W
- Country: Canada
- Province: Manitoba
- Region: Westman
- Incorporated (amalgamated): January 1, 2015

Area
  - Total: 1,762.30 km^{2} (680.43 sq mi)

Population (2021)
  - Total: 3,011
  - Density: 1.709/km^{2} (4.425/sq mi)
- Time zone: UTC-6 (CST)
  - Summer (DST): UTC-5 (CDT)
- Website: myncl.ca

The Municipality of North Cypress – Langford is a rural municipality (RM) in the Canadian province of Manitoba. It is located northeast and east of the City of Brandon. The town of Neepawa borders the RM to the north. Canadian Forces Base Shilo is also adjacent to the RM.

== History ==
The RM was incorporated on January 1, 2015, via the amalgamation of the RMs of Langford and North Cypress. It was formed as a requirement of The Municipal Amalgamations Act, which required that municipalities with a population less than 1,000 amalgamate with one or more neighbouring municipalities by 2015. The Government of Manitoba initiated these amalgamations in order for municipalities to meet the 1997 minimum population requirement of 1,000 to incorporate a municipality.

== Communities ==
- Brookdale
- Edrans
- Wellwood

== Demographics ==
In the 2021 Census of Population conducted by Statistics Canada, North Cypress-Langford had a population of 3,011 living in 902 of its 963 total private dwellings, a change of 9.7% from its 2016 population of 2,745. With a land area of 1,762.3 km^{2} (680.4 sq mi), it had a population density of 1.7/km^{2} (4.4/sq mi) in 2021.
