= Grandview High School =

Grandview High School may refer to:

- Grandview High School (Aurora, Colorado)
- Grandview High School (Grandview, Missouri) in Grandview, Missouri
- Grandview High School (Morrisville, Pennsylvania) in Morrisville, Bucks County, Pennsylvania
- Grandview High School (Texas) in Grandview, Texas
- Grandview High School (Ware, Missouri) in Ware, Missouri
- Grandview High School (Washington) in Grandview, Washington
- Grandview Heights High School (Columbus, Ohio)
