= Rural Municipality of Glenwood =

Rural municipality in Manitoba, Canada

Coordinates: 49°37′15″N 100°15′29″W

The Rural Municipality of Glenwood is a former rural municipality (RM) in the Canadian province of Manitoba. It was originally incorporated as a rural municipality on December 22, 1883. It ceased on January 1, 2015 as a result of its provincially mandated amalgamation with the Town of Souris to form the Municipality of Souris – Glenwood.

The RM was located in the southwestern corner of the province, approximately 47 kilometres southwest of Manitoba's second-largest city, Brandon. It was located at the junction of Manitoba Highway 2, running east and west, while Provincial Road 250 extends north and Manitoba Highway 22 southward. Manitoba Highway 10 provides access to the United States. The RM of Glenwood was home to approximately 800 residents, excluding the residents of Souris.

== Communities ==
- Hayfield
- Menteith
- Newstead
- Schwitzer

== History ==
Though Glenwood was incorporated as a municipality in 1883, its history goes back further. In 1880, the first four permanent residents arrived and established homesteads along Plum Creek, approximately 1.5 kilometres west of what today is Souris. Most early settlers established homesteads in the Souris area, while others settled in the surrounding town sites. The 1880s saw vigorous immigration into the area, especially people who came from Ireland. By the end of 1883, the area was completely settled, and by 1884 the town site of Souris contained over 50 buildings. The Town of Souris was incorporated in 1904 as a separate municipal government, and its first mayor was A.L. Young.
