= Rural Municipality of Park =

Rural municipality in Manitoba, Canada

Coordinates: 50°39′39″N 100°11′00″W

The Rural Municipality of Park is a former rural municipality (RM) in the Canadian province of Manitoba. It was originally incorporated as a rural municipality on January 1, 1997. It ceased on January 1, 2015 as a result of its provincially mandated amalgamation with the RM of Harrison to form the Municipality of Harrison Park.

Prior to 2006, the former RM of Park comprised two disjoint parts, called Park (South) and Park (North). On January 1, 2007, Park (North) was transferred to the Rural Municipality of Shell River. The surviving Park (South) portion was simply called Park. The former RM is adjacent to the southern part of Riding Mountain National Park, hence its name.

== Communities ==
- Crawford Park
- Horod
- Onanole
- Rogers
- Seech
