= Rural Municipality of Minto =

Rural municipality in Manitoba, Canada

Coordinates: 50°19′43″N 99°48′55″W

The Rural Municipality of Minto is a former rural municipality (RM) in the Canadian province of Manitoba. It was originally incorporated as a rural municipality on November 15, 1902. It ceased on January 1, 2015 as a result of its provincially mandated amalgamation with the RM of Odanah to form the Rural Municipality of Minto-Odanah.

The former RM is located north of Brandon and was named after Sir Gilbert Elliot-Murray-Kynynmound, 4th Earl of Minto. It had a land area of 363.65 square kilometres (140 sq mi). The former RM's economic base is primarily agricultural. The historic community of Clanwilliam lies in the northern part of the former RM.

== Communities ==
- Bethany
- Clanwilliam
