= Grandview Peak =

Mountain in Utah, United States

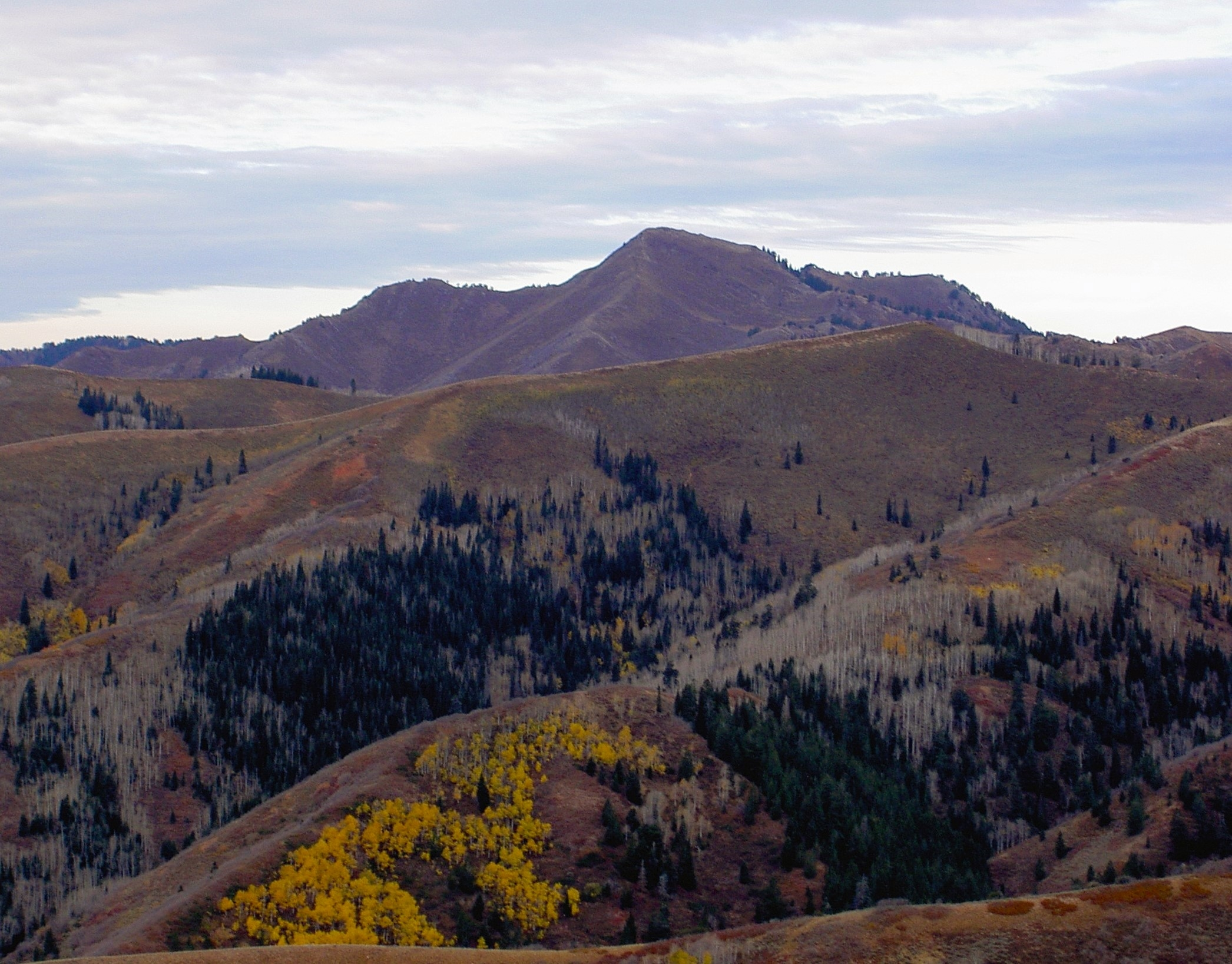
- East aspect

Highest point
- Elevation: 9,410 ft (2,868 m)
- Prominence: 1,910 ft (582 m)
- Parent peak: Francis Peak (9,534 ft)
- Isolation: 12.99 mi (20.91 km)
- Coordinates: 40°51′07″N 111°45′08″W

Geography
- Location within Utah Location within the United States
- Country: United States of America
- State: Utah
- County: Salt Lake / Davis
- Parent range: Wasatch Range; Rocky Mountains
- Topo map: USGS Fort Douglas

Geology
- Rock age: Pennsylvanian-Permian
- Rock type(s): Weber Quartzite and limestone

Climbing
- Easiest route: class 2 hiking

Grandview Peak is a 9,410-foot-elevation (2,868-meter) mountain summit located in Salt Lake County, Utah, United States.

== Description ==
Grandview Peak is located nine miles (14 km) northeast of Salt Lake City on land managed by Wasatch National Forest. It is the highest point within the boundaries of Salt Lake City. The peak is part of the Wasatch Range which is a subrange of the Rocky Mountains. Precipitation runoff from the mountain's north slope drains to Mill Creek, whereas the south slope drains to City Creek. Topographic relief is significant as the summit rises nearly 2,000 feet (610 meters) above City Creek in one mile (1.6 km) and 1,200 feet (366 meters) above Mill Creek in 0.7 mile (1.1 km). This mountain's toponym has been officially adopted by the United States Board on Geographic Names.

== Gallery ==
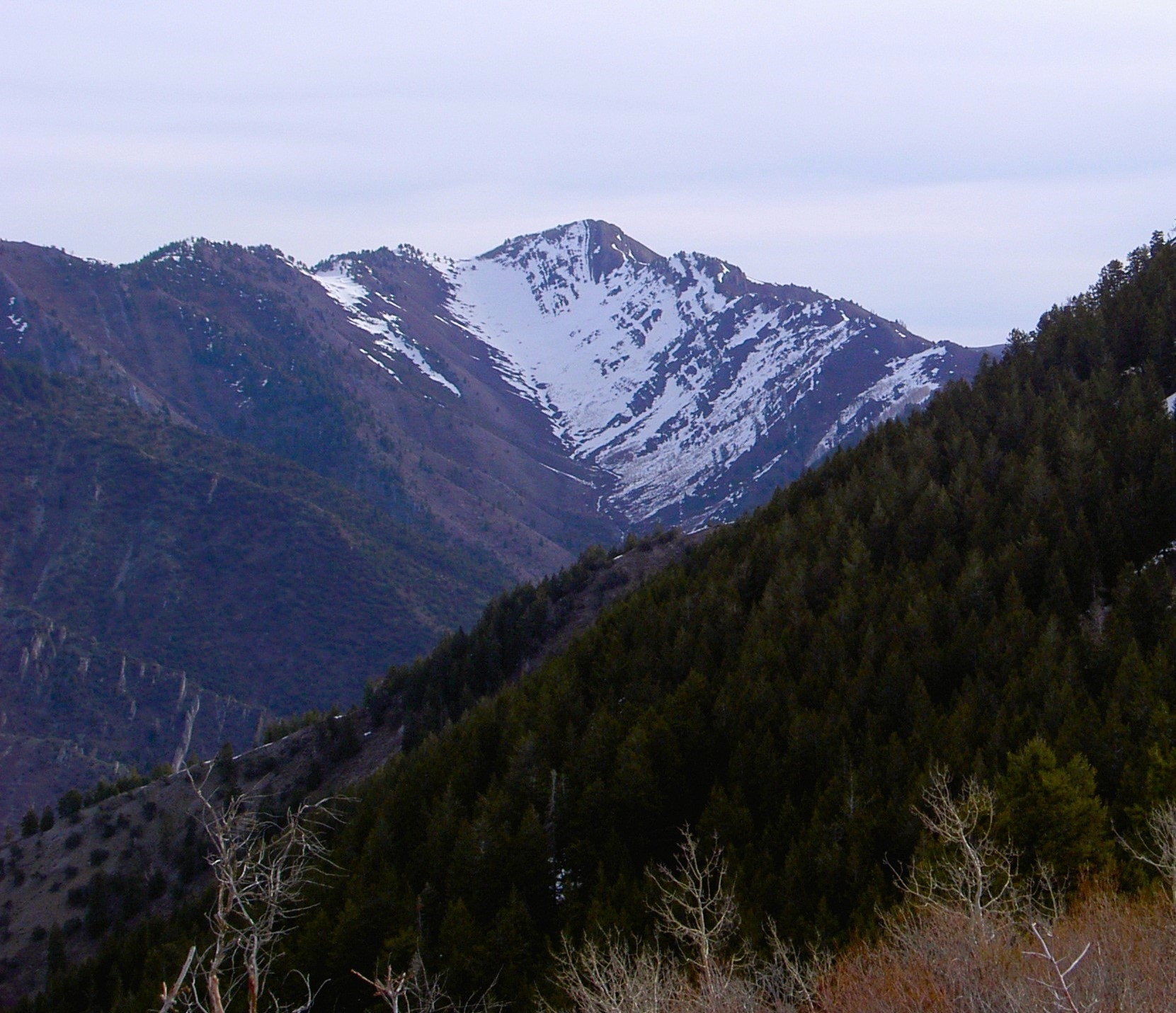
Southwest aspect

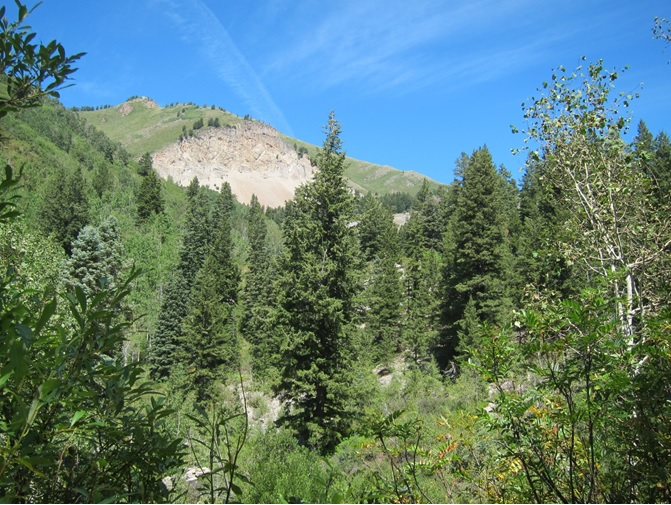
Grandview Peak landslide scarp on south slope
