= Grandview Municipality =

Rural municipality in Manitoba, Canada

Grandview
- Rural municipality
- Grandview Municipality
- Location of the Grandview Municipality in Manitoba
- Coordinates: 51°09′18″N 100°47′21″W
- Country: Canada
- Province: Manitoba
- Region: Parkland
- Census division: No. 17
- Incorporated (amalgamated): January 1, 2015

Government
  - Mayor: Lyle Morran

Area
  - Total: 1,147.99 km^{2} (443.24 sq mi)

Population (2021)
  - Total: 1,419
  - Density: 1.236/km^{2} (3.201/sq mi)
- Time zone: UTC-6 (CST)
  - Summer (DST): UTC-5 (CDT)
- Website: grandviewmanitoba.com

Grandview Municipality is a rural municipality (RM) in the Parkland Region of Manitoba, Canada. It is located in a valley between Duck Mountain Provincial Forest & Park and Riding Mountain National Park, which both lie partially within the RM's territory.

The municipality includes the communities of Grandview (an unincorporated urban community) and Meharry. The Grandview station is located within the RM, through which a Canadian National Railway track serviced by VIA Rail runs through.

== History ==
The RM was incorporated on January 1, 2015, via the amalgamation of the RM of Grandview and the Town of Grandview. It was formed as a requirement of The Municipal Amalgamations Act, which required that municipalities with a population less than 1,000 amalgamate with one or more neighbouring municipalities by 2015. The Government of Manitoba initiated these amalgamations in order for municipalities to meet the 1997 minimum population requirement of 1,000 to incorporate a municipality.

== Government ==
Along with the elected Mayor, the governing body of the Grandview Municipality also consists of 6 elected municipal councilors, from both rural and urban areas.

Grandview Municipality (2015) Mayors

2014-2018	Lyle Morran
2018-2022	Kevin Edmondson
2022–Present	Lyle Morran

R.M of Grandview Reeves

Term	Reeve
1901-1902	J. H. Dalgleish
1902-1903	W. Dickie
1903-1904	J. J. Barnett
1904-1905	?
1905-1908	A. D. Cumming
1908-1910	Samuel Hughes
1910-1912	J. J. Barnett
1912-1914	J. H. Cairns
1914-1918	A. D. Morran
1918-1920	R. J. Dalgleish
1920-1931	John Dunseath
1931-1939	R. J. Dalgleish
1939-1951	Raymond Mitchell
1951-1975	Vernon A. Campbell
1975-1977	Marret Sherman Clark
1977-1978	Wes Leschasin
1978-1980	?
1980-1992	Glen Allen “Bud” Winfield
1992-1998	Waldymir “Walter” Stadnyk
1998-2014	Clifford Kutzan

Town of Grandview Mayors

Term	Mayor
1906-1913	John Franklin Orr
1913-1914	William John Swain
1914-1915	John Franklin Or
1915-1917	James Garfield Vance
1918	William John Swain
1919	John Ernest Hedderly
1920	William John Swain
1921	John R. Hume
1922	H. J. McLean
1923	T. J. Adair
1924-1925	James Garfield Vance
1926	Henry Weidenhammer
1927-1932	George Darling Shortreed
1933-1939	Henry Weidenhammer
1940-1945	William John Swain
1946-1947	Dr. G. J. Creasy
1948-1951	Harry Gilbert Cunningham Bell
1952-1957	M. A. Miller
1958-1967	Harry Gilbert Cunningham Bell
1968-1969	H. M. Jones
1970-1971	John S. Adamack
1972	?
1973-1974	Ray Mitchell
1975-1978	John S. Adamack
1979-1980	?
1980-1983	Edwin S. Olsen
1983-1989	Fred Embryck
1990-1998	Alfred Jacob Dressler
1999-2001	Fred Embryck
2002-2010	Ernest Gurica
2010-2014	Tom Bohun

== Sports ==
Hockey

Grandview Comets are a senior A hockey team from Grandview. They are members of the North Central Hockey League. Home games are played at the Grandview Agricultural Community Center in Grandview.

The Grand Plains Hawks, as well as the Grand Plains Ice Dogs, are the local minor hockey league teams.

Baseball

The Grandview Lakers are a senior baseball team from Grandview. They currently play in the South East Senior Baseball League. Home games are played at the Lakers Diamond, located in Wilson Centennial Park in Grandview.

There are also various ages of minor ball and softball, also bearing the Lakers name.

Curling

Although there are no official curling teams, there are several male, female and co-ed tournaments that take place in the Grandview Curling Club.

The local school, Grandview K-12, also has a male and female sports teams, under the name Grandview Spartans. These teams compete in various sports, including volleyball, basketball, track & field, and curling.

== Demographics ==
In the 2021 Census of Population conducted by Statistics Canada, Grandview had a population of 1,419 living in 657 of its 750 total private dwellings, a change of −4.3% from its 2016 population of 1,482. With a land area of 1,147.99 km^{2} (443.24 sq mi), it had a population density of 1.2/km^{2} (3.2/sq mi) in 2021.

== Points of Interest ==
With the Duck Mountain Provincial Park to the North, and the Riding Mountain National Park to the South, Grandview Municipality has many outdoor activities, including fishing, hunting, hiking, camping, as well as 500 km local of Snowmobile trails, maintained by the Intermountain Snowmobile Club.

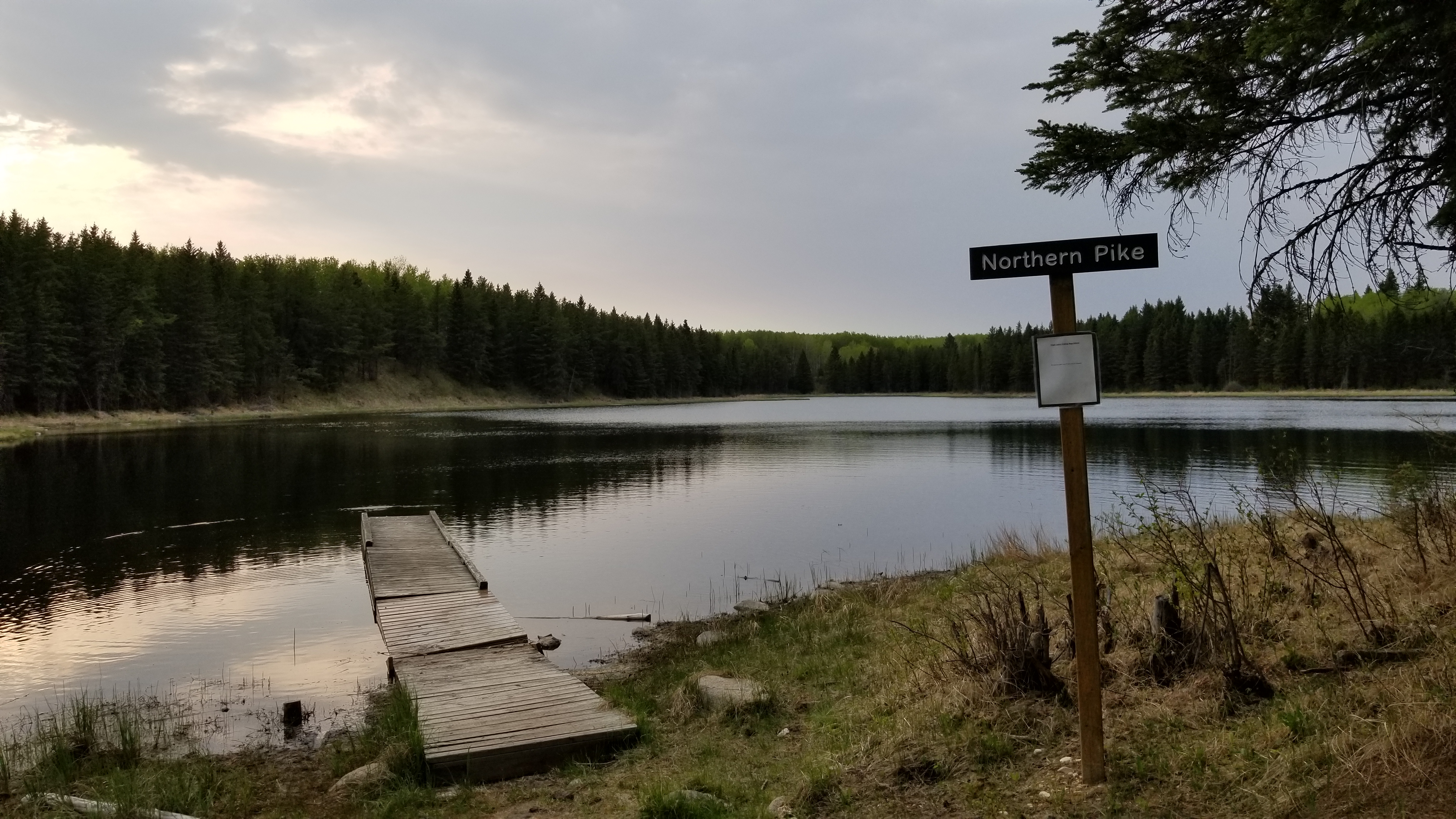
Northern Pike Lake in Duck Mountain Provincial Park

Local Attractions

- Grandview Museum (formally Watson Crossley Community Museum)
- Gilbert Plains Country Club (16 km)
- Baldy Mountain Viewing Tower (Duck Mountain Provincial Park; 38 km)
- Shingoose Lake Campground (Duck Mountain Provincial Park; 60 km)
- Blue Lake Campground (Duck Mountain Provincial Park; 61 km)
- Child's Lake Campground (Duck Mountain Provincial Park; 77 km)
- Sugarloaf Trailhead (Riding Mountain National Park; 23 km)

Recreation Locations

- Grandview Agricultural Community Center
- Grandview Kinsmen Community Center
- Grandview Curling Club
- Wilson Centennial Park
- Seniors' Park

Former School Sites

- Acton School / Sugarloaf School No. 2196
- Artemesia School No. 1170
- Blackstone School No. 2158
- Burritt School / Hollybourne School No. 2190
- Denepro School No. 2232
- Duck Mountain School No. 1179
- Grandview School No. 748
- Grifton School No. 1619
- Halton School No. 1383
- Locksley School No. 2159
- Morranville School #1 No. 901
- Morranville School #2 No. 901
- Mossvale School No. 2267
- Mountain Gap School No. 898
- Ottawa School No. 899
- Rose Ridge School No. 2205
- Spruce Bluff School No. 874
- Tamarisk School No. 847
- Valley River School No. 825
- Wicklow School No. 2007

Churches

- All Saints Ukrainian Orthodox Church
- Christ Church Anglican
- Holy Eucharist Ukrainian Catholic Church and Cemetery
- Holy Trinity Ukrainian Catholic Church and Cemetery
- Hope Lutheran Church
- St. Elias Ukrainian Catholic Church and Cemetery
- St. Margaret's Roman Catholic Church
- Tamarisk United Church and Cemetery
- Umatilla United Church and Hall
- Grandview Memorial Gardens

Other Historical Points of Interest:

- Former Burrows Mill Site Monument
- Former Canadian Bank of Commerce Building
- First Home Monument
- First Sod Turning Monument
- Former Grandview Telephone Exchange Building
- Grandview War Memorial

== Climate ==
- Average January temperature: -18 °C
- Average July temperature: 22 °C
- Average annual precipitation: 529.6mm with 138.6 cm of snow

== Local media ==
=== Newspapers ===
After 117 years in business, the Grandview Exponent closed its doors in 2017.

In 2018, the non-profit newspaper, The Plain View, was established, providing locals with local news and information within the Grandview-Gilbert Plains areas.

=== Radio stations ===
- AM 730 CKDM (Dauphin)
- CBWW-FM 105.3, CBC Radio One (repeats CBW Winnipeg)
- (future station) Grandview FM
