= Rural Municipality of Russell =

Rural municipality in Manitoba, Canada

Coordinates: 50°43′38″N 101°22′08″W

The Rural Municipality of Russell is a former rural municipality (RM) in the Canadian province of Manitoba. It was originally incorporated as a rural municipality on August 15, 1881. It ceased on January 1, 2015, as a result of its provincially mandated amalgamation with the Town of Russell and the Village of Binscarth to form the Municipality of Russell – Binscarth.

The former RM is located in the Parkland Region of the province adjacent to the Gambler 63 First Nations Indian reserve to the south. It had a population of 661 according to the Canada 2006 Census.

== Communities ==
- Harrowby
- Johnson
- Millwood
