= Rural Municipality of South Norfolk =

Place in Canada

Coordinates: 49°39′55″N 98°35′48″W

The Rural Municipality of South Norfolk is a former rural municipality (RM) in the Canadian province of Manitoba. It was originally incorporated as a rural municipality on December 22, 1883. It ceased on January 1, 2015, as a result of its provincially mandated amalgamation with the Town of Treherne to form the Municipality of Norfolk Treherne.

The former RM is located in the Central Plains Region of the province. A portion of the Long Plain First Nation Indian reserve lies within its northeast corner. It was originally part of the RM of Norfolk, which was originally incorporated in 1879 before being divided into the former RMs of North Norfolk and South Norfolk. It had a population of 1,170 in the 2006 census.

== Communities ==
- Lavenham
- Mezieries
- Rathwell
