= Rural Municipality of Odanah =

Rural municipality in Manitoba, Canada

Coordinates: 50°09′07″N 99°47′50″W

The Rural Municipality of Odanah is a former rural municipality (RM) in the Canadian province of Manitoba. It was originally incorporated as a rural municipality on December 22, 1883. Its name comes from the Ojibwe word Oodena meaning a "village", a "community". It ceased on January 1, 2015 as a result of its provincially mandated amalgamation with the RM of Minto to form the Rural Municipality of Minto – Odanah.
