= Grandview, Prince Edward Island =

Grandview
- Settlement
- Location of Grandview in Prince Edward Island
- Coordinates: 46.123°N 62.773°W
- Country: Canada
- Province: Prince Edward Island
- County: Queens County
- Postal code span: C0A
- Area codes: 902, 782

Grandview is a settlement in Prince Edward Island. It is home to the Grandview Welding company.
