= Rural Municipality of Lawrence =

Rural municipality in Manitoba, Canada

Coordinates: 51°21′42″N 99°38′39″W

The Rural Municipality of Lawrence is a former rural municipality (RM) in the Canadian province of Manitoba. It was originally incorporated as a rural municipality on November 5, 1914. It ceased on January 1, 2015, as a result of its provincially mandated amalgamation with the RM of Ochre River to form the Rural Municipality of Lakeshore.

The former RM is located on the northeast shore of Dauphin Lake.

== Communities ==
- East Bay
- Freedale
- Magnet
- Million
- Moose Bay
- Rorketon
- Toutes Aides
- Weiden
