= Rural Municipality of Woodworth =

Rural municipality in Manitoba, Canada

Coordinates: 49°55′51″N 100°40′46″W

The Rural Municipality of Woodworth is a former rural municipality (RM) in the Canadian province of Manitoba. It was originally incorporated as a rural municipality on December 22, 1883. It ceased on January 1, 2015, as a result of its provincially mandated amalgamation with the RM of Wallace and the Village of Elkhorn to form the Rural Municipality of Wallace – Woodworth.

The Sioux Valley Dakota Nation Indian reserve is located by its southeast corner of the former RM.

== Communities ==
- Harding
- Kenton
- Lenore
