= Rural Municipality of Harrison =

Rural municipality in Manitoba, Canada

Coordinates: 50°27′42″N 100°05′31″W

The Rural Municipality of Harrison is a former rural municipality (RM) in the Canadian province of Manitoba. It was originally incorporated as a rural municipality on December 22, 1883. It ceased on January 1, 2015 as a result of its provincially mandated amalgamation with the RM of Park to form the Municipality of Harrison Park. In 1891, the Harrison subdistrict had a population of 437.

The RM was located north of Brandon on the Yellowhead Highway with its offices at Newdale, Manitoba. The main reserve of the Rolling River First Nation lied within the east-central portion of the RM. The RM was named for David Howard Harrison who became premier of Manitoba in 1887.

== Communities ==
- Newdale
- Rackham
- Sandy Lake
