= Grandview Township =

Grandview Township may refer to the following townships in the United States:

- Grandview Township, Edgar County, Illinois
- Grandview Township, Louisa County, Iowa
- Grandview Township, Washington County, Ohio
- Grandview Township, Lyon County, Minnesota
- Grandview Township, Ford County, Kansas
