= Rural Municipality of Shell River =

Rural municipality in Manitoba, Canada

Coordinates: 51°22′35″N 101°24′52″W

The Rural Municipality of Shell River was a rural municipality (RM) in the Canadian province of Manitoba. It was incorporated as a rural municipality on December 22, 1883. On January 1, 2015, it was amalgamated as a result a provincial government mandate with the RM of Hillsburg and the Town of Roblin to form the Municipality of Hillsburg – Roblin – Shell River.

On January 1, 2007, the area of Park (North), which was a detached section of the former RM of Park, was added to the former RM of Shell River.

== Communities ==
- Boggy Creek
- Deepdale
- Makaroff
- San Clara
- Tummel
- Walkerburn
- Zelena
