= Rural Municipality of Shellmouth-Boulton =

Rural municipality in Manitoba, Canada

Coordinates: 50°59′32″N 101°14′30″W

The Rural Municipality of Shellmouth-Boulton is a former rural municipality (RM) in the Canadian province of Manitoba. It was originally incorporated as a rural municipality on January 1, 1999. It ceased on January 1, 2015, as a result of its provincially mandated amalgamation with the RM of Silver Creek to form the Rural Municipality of Riding Mountain West.

The former RM is located in the Parkland Region of the province. It was formed in 1999 through the amalgamation of the former RMs of Boulton (incorporated in 1883) and Shellmouth (incorporated in 1907). The former RM includes the Asessippi Provincial Park and a portion of Riding Mountain National Park. It had a population of 906 in the 2006 census.

== Communities ==
- Cracknell
- Dropmore
- Endcliffe
- Inglis
- Lennard
- Petlura
- Shell Valley
- Shellmouth
