= Rural Municipality of Silver Creek =

Rural municipality in Manitoba, Canada

Coordinates: 50°43′37″N 101°05′24″W

The Rural Municipality of Silver Creek is a former rural municipality (RM) in the Canadian province of Manitoba. It was originally incorporated as a rural municipality on December 22, 1883. It ceased on January 1, 2015, as a result of its provincially mandated amalgamation with the RM of Shellmouth-Boulton to form the Rural Municipality of Riding Mountain West.

The former RM is located in the Parkland Region of the province. It borders the Waywayseecappo First Nation Indian reserve to the east. It had a population of 483 in the 2006 census.

== Communities ==
- Angusville
- Silverton
