= Rapid City, Manitoba =

Rapid City
- Local urban district
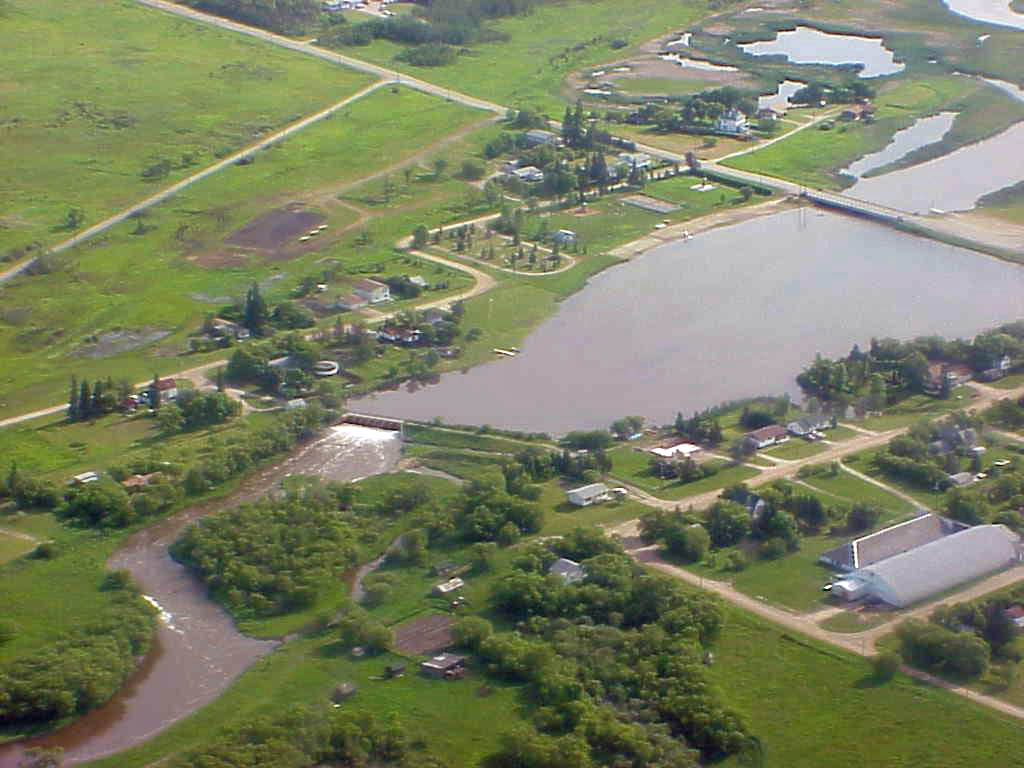
- Rapid City Dam and Reservoir

- Location of Rapid City in Manitoba
- Coordinates: 50°07′15″N 100°02′09″W
- Country: Canada
- Province: Manitoba
- Region: Westman
- Rural municipality: Oakview
- Incorporated: June 9, 1883
- Amalgamated: January 1, 2015

Area
  - Land: 5.19 km^{2} (2.00 sq mi)

Population (2021)
  - Total: 796
  - Density: 77.3/km^{2} (200/sq mi)
- Time zone: UTC-6 (EST)
  - Summer (DST): UTC-5 (EDT)

Rapid City is an unincorporated community recognized as a local urban district that also once held town status in southwest Manitoba, Canada within the Rural Municipality of Oakview. It is located about 30 km north of Brandon. Rapid City is a farming community that is developed on the banks of the Little Saskatchewan River. The dam and reservoir in Rapid City were built by the province in 1961, the reservoir stores 200 acre-feet (250,000 m^{3}) and provides a water supply and recreational facility for the community.

== History ==
As the railroad expanded in the 1870s, settlers were drawn to the area to build their homes and set up their businesses. The community was originally called Ralston's Colony (after John Ralston, an early settler). Around 1877, it was decided to rename the community Rapid City. Since the community was on the banks of the Little Saskatchewan River, and it was a "rapid stream," "rapid" and "city" were chosen and reflected the optimism of those early settlers.

It was assumed that the projected northerly route away from Portage la Prairie would take it through Rapid City and its narrow river crossing; however, the route suddenly changed to a more westerly route. That brought it through the location of present-day Brandon, which resulted in that city's boom and growth. In 1891, the subdistrict of Rapid City subdistrict had a population of 543.

== Education ==
Rapid City Elementary School provides K-8 education for children in the community, and is part of the Rolling River School Division.

== Demographics ==
In the 2021 Census of Population conducted by Statistics Canada, Rapid City had a population of 796 living in 353 of its 364 total private dwellings, a change of 66.5% from its 2016 population of 478. With a land area of 5.19 km^{2} (2.00 sq mi), it had a population density of 153.4/km^{2} (397.2/sq mi) in 2021.

In 2011, the average dwelling is home to 2.3 people. The median value of a household in Rapid City is $100,317, almost three times lower than the national median at $280,552. The median income an individual makes is $27,088, and the median (after-tax) income in Rapid City is $43,199, lower than the national median at $54,089.

Almost every person in Rapid City reported their mother tongue as English (97.6%).

The 2011 National Household Survey reported that everyone in the community was White. However, 13.3% of the population claim to have some Aboriginal ancestry.

Over half (56.0%) of the residents are of a Christian faith, and 42.9% say they have no religious beliefs.
