= Grandview, Manitoba =

Coordinates: 51°10′27″N 100°41′52″W

Grandview
- Interactive map of Grandview
- Country: Canada
- Province: Manitoba

Area
  - Total: 2.82 km^{2} (1.09 sq mi)

Population (2021)
  - Total: 808
  - Density: 286.9/km^{2} (743/sq mi)
- Time zone: UTC−6 (Central Standard Time)
  - Summer (DST): UTC−5

Grandview is an unincorporated urban community in the Grandview Municipality within the Canadian province of Manitoba that held town status prior to January 1, 2015. It is located 45 kilometres west of the City of Dauphin along the Valley River. Grandview Manitoba is home to NHL's Ryan Pulock.

The community was named for the picturesque views of both the Duck Mountains to the north and the Riding Mountains to the south. The main access to the community is Provincial Highway 5. Grandview railway station is served by Via Rail's Winnipeg–Churchill train.

The local economy is agriculturally and service industry based. However, at one time a thriving economy was also based on a local wood mill.

== Demographics ==
In the 2021 Census of Population conducted by Statistics Canada, Grandview had a population of 808 living in 410 of its 460 total private dwellings, a change of −6.5% from its 2016 population of 864. With a land area of 2.82 km^{2} (1.09 sq mi), it had a population density of 286.5/km^{2} (742.1/sq mi) in 2021.
