= Manitoba Provincial Road 268 =

Provincial road in Manitoba, Canada

Provincial Road 268
- Lenswood Highway
- PR 268 highlighted in red

Route information
- Maintained by Department of Infrastructure
- Length: 44.7 km (27.8 mi)
- Existed: 1966–present

Major junctions
- North end: PTH 10 near Birch River
- PR 266 in Birch River
- South end: PTH 10 near Minitonas

Location
- Country: Canada
- Province: Manitoba
- Rural municipalities: Minitonas – Bowsman; Mountain

Highway system
- Provincial highways in Manitoba; Winnipeg City Routes
← PR 267	→ PR 269

Provincial Road 268 (PR 268), known locally as the Lenswood Highway, is a 44.7-kilometre-long (27.8 mi) north-south provincial road in the Swan River Valley of the Parkland Region of Manitoba. It serves the town of Birch River and the hamlet of Lenswood, while also acting as a shortcut for travelers along PTH 10 (Northern Woods and Water Route) wishing to bypass the town of Swan River.

== Route description ==
PR 268 starts in the Municipality of Minitonas-Bowsman just east of the town of Minitonas at an intersection with PTH 10 (Northern Woods and Water Route). It heads due north through rural farmland for several kilometres to cross the Sinclair River before having an intersection with former PR 587 (closed in 2006). The highway now winds along the east bank of the Swan River for few kilometres before entering the Rural Municipality of Mountain. Immediately upon entering the rural municipality, it crosses the Swan River as it passes through the hamlet of Lenswood, for which the highway is named. As the highway curves and begins travelling due westward, it crosses the Woody River. PR 268 crosses the Birch River just prior to going through a switchback to enter the village of Birch River. It travels straight through town along 3rd Street and Lorne Avenue, where it has a junction with PR 266. Leaving Birch River, the highway winds through some woodlands before coming to an end at another intersection with PTH 10 (NWWR) along the edge of the Porcupine Provincial Forest. The entire length of PR 268 is a paved, two-lane highway.

The Swan River bridge is the northernmost crossing of the Swan River. The bridge was replaced in October 2012 because the old one was too narrow.

== Major intersections ==
Division	Location	km	mi	Destinations	Notes
Minitonas-Bowsman		0.0	0.0	PTH 10 (NWWR) – Dauphin, Swan River	Southern terminus; Road continues south as Road 146W
Minitonas-Bowsman		8.0	5.0	Bridge over the Sinclair River	
Minitonas-Bowsman		14.6	9.1	PR 587 west – Craigsford	Closed and decommissioned in 2006 along with that highway's ford crossing of the Swan River
Mountain	Lenswood	24.8– 24.9	15.4– 15.5	Bridge over the Swan River	
Mountain		32.2	20.0	Bridge over the Woody River	
Mountain		36.7	22.8	Road 149W	Former PR 366 south
Mountain		37.6	23.4	Bridge over the Birch River	
Mountain	Birch River	42.4	26.3	PR 266 south	Northern terminus of PR 266
Mountain		44.7	27.8	PTH 10 (NWWR) – Bowsman, Mafeking	Northern terminus
1.000 mi = 1.609 km; 1.000 km = 0.621 mi: Concurrency terminus
