= Manitoba Provincial Road 266 =

Provincial road in Manitoba, Canada

Provincial Road 266
- PR 266 highlighted in red

Route information
- Maintained by Department of Infrastructure
- Length: 24.0 km (14.9 mi)
- Existed: 1966–present

Major junctions
- North end: PR 268 in Birch River
- PR 366 in Bowsman
- South end: PTH 10 in Bowsman

Location
- Country: Canada
- Province: Manitoba
- Rural municipalities: Minitonas – Bowsman; Mountain

Highway system
- Provincial highways in Manitoba; Winnipeg City Routes
← PR 265	→ PR 267

Provincial Road 266 (PR 266), is a short 24.0-kilometre-long (14.9 mi) north-south provincial road in the Swan River Valley of the Parkland Region of Manitoba. It serves as a connection between the town of Bowsman and Birch River as well as a longer alternative to PTH 10 (Northern Woods and Water Route) between the same two communities.

== Route description ==
Provincial Road 266 starts on the east side of the village of Bowsman at PTH 10 and close to PR 279. The route leads to Birch River. It is an alternative route to PTH 10. The first part of the road near Bowsman follows along the Woody River, then it travels straight north. In Birch River it joins up with PR 268, about a mile from PTH 10. It is almost entirely a gravel road, except for the paved sections within Bowsman and Birch River.

== Major intersections ==
Division	Location	km	mi	Destinations	Notes
Minitonas-Bowsman	Bowsman	0.0	0.0	PTH 10 (NWWR) – Swan River, Birch River	Southern terminus
Minitonas-Bowsman	Bowsman	1.2	0.75	PR 366 south – Craigsford, Minitonas	Northern terminus of PR 366; former PR 587 west
Minitonas-Bowsman		2.1	1.3	Bridge over the Bowsman River	
Mountain	Birch River	23.5	14.6	Bridge over the Birch River	
Mountain	Birch River	24.0	14.9	PR 268 (Lorne Avenue / 3rd Street (Lenswood Highway))	Northern terminus
1.000 mi = 1.609 km; 1.000 km = 0.621 mi
