= Manitoba Provincial Road 274 =

Provincial Road in Manitoba, Canada

Provincial Road 274
- PR 274 highlighted in red

Route information
- Maintained by Department of Infrastructure
- Length: 91.6 km (56.9 mi)
- Existed: 1966–present

Major junctions
- South end: PTH 5 / PTH 10 near Dauphin
- PTH 5 in Gilbert Plains; PR 267 near Venlaw
- North end: PTH 10 / PTH 10A in Ethelbert

Location
- Country: Canada
- Province: Manitoba
- Rural municipalities: Dauphin, Gilbert Plains, Ethelbert

Highway system
- Provincial highways in Manitoba; Winnipeg City Routes
| ← PR 273 | → PR 275 |

Provincial Road 274 (PR 274) is a 91.6-kilometre-long (56.9 mi) north–south highway in the Parkland Region of Manitoba. It connects the towns of Gilbert Plains and Ethelbert, as well as providing a loop off of Provincial Trunk Highway 5 (PTH 5, Parks Route) through the community of Keld. The portion of the highway through Keld is signed east–west, and the rest is signed north–south.

== Route description ==
PR 274 begins in the Rural Municipality of Dauphin at an intersection with PTH 5/PTH 10 (Parks Route) just west of the city of Dauphin, heading south as a paved two-lane highway through the locality of Spruce Creek and crossing a couple of small creeks before coming to an intersection between Road 117W and Road 138N, where the pavement ends and the highway makes a sharp right. Now heading due west as a gravel road, PR 274 travels due west through rural farmland for several kilometres to pass through the community of Keld before entering the Rural Municipality of Gilbert Plains. It continues west through rural areas for several more kilometres, travelling only 3 kilometres (1.9 mi) north of the Riding Mountain National Park boundary, before making a sharp right turn onto Road 129W, where the pavement resumes. The highway crosses the Wilson River before entering the town of Gilbert Plains as it passes by the Gilbert Plains Airport. Travelling through town along Cutforth Street, PR 274 travels through neighbourhoods as it crosses both PTH 5 and a railroad along the eastern side of downtown. Leaving town and crossing the Valley River, the highway heads due north through farmland for the next several kilometres, going through a switchback just prior to passing through Venlaw, where it crosses the Drifting River. Entering the Municipality of Ethelbert at its junction with PR 267, PR 274 travels through the hamlet of Mink Creek, crossing the creek of the same name, prior to crossing the Fishing River, going through a switchback, and then making a sharp right. It now curves back left before crossing a creek and making another sharp right, entering the town of Ethelbert and coming to an end shortly thereafter at an intersection with PTH 10; the road continues into downtown as Main Street (PTH 10A).

== Major intersections ==
| Division | Location | km | mi | Destinations | Notes |
|---|---|---|---|---|---|
| Dauphin | | 0.0 | 0.0 | PTH 5 / PTH 10 (Parks Route) – Dauphin, Gilbert Plains | Southern terminus; road continues north as Road 117W |
| Dauphin | | 13.1 | 8.1 | Road 117W / Road 138N | Cardinal direction switch from north-south to east-west; eastern end of unpaved section |
| Gilbert Plains | | 32.8 | 20.4 | Road 138N / Road 129W | Cardinal direction switch from east-west to north-south; western end of unpaved section |
| Gilbert Plains | | 41.4 | 25.7 | Bridge over the Wilson River | |
| Gilbert Plains | Gilbert Plains | 44.3 | 27.5 | – Gilbert Plains Airport | Access road into airport |
| Gilbert Plains | Gilbert Plains | 45.1 | 28.0 | PTH 5 (Parks Route) – Grandview, Dauphin | |
| Gilbert Plains | | 47.0 | 29.2 | Bridge over the Valley River | |
| Gilbert Plains | Venlaw | 65.7 | 40.8 | Venlaw Road | Former PR 267 west |
| Gilbert Plains | Venlaw | 66.4 | 41.3 | Bridge over the Drifting River | |
| Gilbert Plains–Ethelbert boundary | | 69.0 | 42.9 | PR 267 east – Sifton | Western terminus of PR 267 |
| Ethelbert | | 77.8 | 48.3 | Bridge over the Fishing River | |
| Ethelbert | Ethelbert | 91.6 | 56.9 | PTH 10 – Pine River, Dauphin; PTH 10A south (Main Street) – Ethelbert | Northern terminus; road continues east as PTH 10A (Main Street) |
1.000 mi = 1.609 km; 1.000 km = 0.621 mi
