= Manitoba Highway 10A =

Highway in Manitoba

Provincial Trunk Highway 10A
- Manitoba Provincial Highway 5A(concurrency); Buchanan Ave; Main St (Dauphin); 4th Ave

Route information
- Auxiliary route of PTH 10
- Maintained by Manitoba Infrastructure

Flin Flon segment
- Length: 3.1 km (1.9 mi)
- North end: PTH 10 west of Flin Flon
- Major intersections: PR 291 south (Channing Drive)
- South end: PTH 10 east of Flin Flon

Swan River segment
- Length: 4.2 km (2.6 mi)
- North end: PTH 10 north of Swan River
- Major intersections: PR 275 west (Ditch Road); PTH 83A (Centennial Drive)
- South end: PTH 10 / PTH 83 / PTH 83A east of Swan River

Ethelbert segment
- Length: 2.9 km (1.8 mi)
- North end: PTH 10 / PR 274 south near Ethelbert
- South end: PTH 10 south of Ethelbert

Dauphin segment
- Length: 8.3 km (5.2 mi) Coterminous with PTH 5A
- West end: PTH 5 / PTH 10 west of Dauphin
- Major intersections: PR 362 north (Keays Street); PTH 20A north (Main Street N.); PTH 20A south (1st Avenue N.E.)
- South end: PTH 5 / PTH 10 south of Dauphin

Location
- Country: Canada
- Province: Manitoba

Highway system
- Provincial highways in Manitoba; Winnipeg City Routes
← PTH 10	→ PTH 11

Provincial Trunk Highway 10A (PTH 10A) is the name of four provincial primary highways located in the Canadian province of Manitoba. These highways are alternate routes of PTH 10, and each section was the original alignment of the parent highway. The four sections are located in Flin Flon, Swan River, Ethelbert, and Dauphin.

== Flin Flon section ==
Provincial Trunk Highway 10A
- Location: Flin Flon
- Length: 3.1 km (1.9 mi)
- Existed: 1969–present

The section in Flin Flon follows the original alignment of PTH 10. The current alignment of PTH 10 bypasses around Flin Flon and into the downtown area. Starting at PTH 10, it follows 3rd Ave. E. through most of Flin Flon until turning right on Callinan Ln. and left on 1st Ave. until it reaches PTH 10 again, about 600m from where PTH 10 meets the Saskatchewan boundary. The speed limit on the route is 50 km/h.

Location	mi	km	Destinations	Notes
Flin Flon	0.0	0.0	PTH 10 (Main Street) – Creighton, Cranberry Portage, The Pas	Western terminus
Flin Flon	1.6	0.99	PR 291 south (Channing Drive) – Channing	Northern terminus of PR 291
Flin Flon	3.1	1.9	PTH 10 – Flin Flon city centre, The Pas	Eastern terminus
1.000 mi = 1.609 km; 1.000 km = 0.621 mi

== Swan River section ==
Provincial Trunk Highway 10A
- Location: Swan River
- Length: 4.2 km (2.6 mi)
- Existed: 1966–present

The section of PTH 10A in Swan River is an important route providing connections to PR 275 and PTH 83A. It branches off from PTH 10 north of Swan River. Once within Swan River it becomes 4th Ave. N. Just a few metres from entering Swan River, the highway intersects PR 275. The highway meets PTH 83A (Main St.) southwest of the town centre and turns left. The two highways run in concurrence through the town centre along Main Street until they terminate at PTH 10 and the current northbound terminus for PTH 83. On the route, the speed limit is mainly 50 km/h, and 80 km/h approaching PTH 10 on the north side.

Division	Location	km	mi	Destinations	Notes
Town of Swan River		0.0	0.0	PTH 10 (Kelsey Trail / Main Street E) – The Pas, Dauphin PTH 83 south (Valley Road) – Roblin PTH 83A begins	Southern terminus; northern of both PTH 83 and PTH 83A; southern end of PTH 83A concurrency
Town of Swan River		1.3	0.81	PTH 83A south (Main Street E)	Northern end of PTH 83A concurrency
Town of Swan River		1.7– 1.8	1.1– 1.1	Bridge over the Swan River	
Town of Swan River		2.1	1.3	PR 275 west (Athlone Street)	Eastern terminus of PR 275
Swan Valley West		4.2	2.6	PTH 10 (Kelsey Trail) – The Pas, Dauphin	Northern terminus
1.000 mi = 1.609 km; 1.000 km = 0.621 mi: Concurrency terminus

== Ethelbert section ==
Provincial Trunk Highway 10A
- Location: Ethelbert
- Length: 2.9 km (1.8 mi)
- Existed: 1969–present

The section of PTH 10A in Ethelbert goes through the town, while PTH 10 bypasses it. It branches off PTH 10 just west of Ethelbert (PR 274 branches off this intersection in the opposite direction and travels south) and becomes Main St once inside the town until it intersects with Second Avenue.

From this intersection, PTH 10A turns right and merges with PTH 10 about two kilometres south of the town.

Division	Location	km	mi	Destinations	Notes
Ethelbert		0.0	0.0	PTH 10 – Pine River, Dauphin	Southern terminus
Ethelbert	Ethelbert	2.0	1.2	Bridge over Shanty Creek	
Ethelbert	Ethelbert	2.2	1.4	Main Street to PR 269 – downtown	Former PR 269; PTH 10A transitions from 2nd Avenue onto Main Street
Ethelbert		2.9	1.8	PTH 10 – Pine River, Dauphin; PR 274 south (Main Street) – Mink Creek	Northern terminus of PTH 10A and PR 274
1.000 mi = 1.609 km; 1.000 km = 0.621 mi: Route transition

== Dauphin section ==
Provincial Trunk Highway 10A
- Location: Dauphin
- Length: 8.3 km (5.2 mi)
- Existed: 1989–present

The fourth and last section of PTH 10 is located in Dauphin. It starts at PTH 5/10 west of the city and from there overlaps Provincial Trunk Highway 5A (PTH 5A). PTH 5A/10A runs concurrently for the entire route.

At the city limits, the road becomes Buchanon Avenue until it intersects with PR 362 (Keays Street). Past this intersection, PTH 5A/10A becomes 2nd Avenue NW and travels in a southeast direction until it meets PTH 20A (Main Street N.) in Dauphin's city centre and turns right. PTH 20A comes into the concurrency for about 20m before turning left on to 1st Avenue N.E.

PTH 5A/10A continues along Main Street S. to its terminus with PTH 5/10 at the south end of the city.

Division	Location	km	mi	Destinations	Notes
Dauphin		0.0	0.0	PTH 5 / PTH 10 (Parks Route) – Neepawa, Brandon, Roblin; PTH 5A begins	Southern terminus of both PTH 10A and PTH 5A; southern end of PTH 5A concurrency
City of Dauphin		3.8	2.4	PTH 20A south (1st Avenue NE)	Southern end of PTH 20A concurrency
City of Dauphin		3.9	2.4	PTH 20A north (Main Street N)	Northern end of PTH 20A concurrency
City of Dauphin		4.3– 4.4	2.7– 2.7	Bridge over the Vermilion River	
City of Dauphin		5.0	3.1	PR 362 north (Keays Street) – Valley River, Sifton	Southern terminus of PR 362
Dauphin		8.3	5.2	PTH 5 / PTH 10 (Parks Route) – Roblin, Neepawa, Brandon; PTH 5A ends	Northern terminus of both PTH 10A and PTH 5A; northern end of PTH 5A concurrency
1.000 mi = 1.609 km; 1.000 km = 0.621 mi: Concurrency terminus

== See also ==
- PTH 10 - the highway's parent route.
- PTH 110 - a bypass around the city of Brandon.
