= Manitoba Provincial Road 267 =

Provincial Road in Manitoba, Canada

Provincial Road 267
- PR 267 highlighted in red

Route information
- Maintained by Department of Infrastructure
- Length: 32.6 km (20.3 mi)
- Existed: 1966–present

Major junctions
- West end: PR 274 north of Venlaw
- PTH 10 north of Ashville; PR 362 in Sifton
- East end: PTH 20 east of Sifton

Location
- Country: Canada
- Province: Manitoba
- Rural municipalities: Ethelbert, Gilbert Plains, Dauphin

Highway system
- Provincial highways in Manitoba; Winnipeg City Routes
← PR 266	→ PR 268

Provincial Road 267 (PR 267) is a 32.6-kilometre-long (20.3 mi) east–west highway in the Parkland Region of Manitoba, connecting the town of Sifton with Venlaw, as well as PTH 10 and PTH 20.

== Route description ==
PR 267 begins on the border between the Rural Municipality of Gilbert Plains and the Municipality of Ethelbert at an intersection with PR 274 just a few kilometres north of Venlaw. It heads due east as a gravel road for several kilometres through a mix of rural farmland and wooded areas to have a junction with PTH 10, roughly halfway between Ashville and Ethelbert. Becoming paved, the highway continues east through farmland to enter the Rural Municipality of Dauphin and travel through the town of Sifton, where it crosses the former Lake Manitoba Railway and Canal Company railroad and has an intersection with PR 362 on the northern end of downtown. Leaving Sifton, PR 267 continues east through farmland for a few more kilometres before coming to an end at an intersection with PTH 20 (Northern Woods and Water Route). The road continues east as Road 162N to Sifton Beach on Dauphin Lake.

== History ==
Prior to 1992, PR 267 continued along PR 274 southbound for 3.2 kilometres (2.0 mi) to the community of Venlaw, where it headed due west along what is now Venlaw Road for 18.0 kilometres (11.2 mi) through Drifting River and Grifton to enter the Duck Mountain Provincial Forest, where it came to an end at PR 366.

== Major intersections ==
Division	Location	km	mi	Destinations	Notes
Gilbert Plains / Ethelbert boundary		0.0	0.0	PR 274 – Gilbert Plains, Ethelbert	Western terminus; western end of unpaved section; road continues west as Road 162N
Gilbert Plains / Ethelbert boundary		8.8	5.5	PTH 10 – Ethelbert, Dauphin	Eastern end of unpaved section
Dauphin	Sifton	24.0	14.9	PR 362 south (2nd Avenue) – Valley River	Northern terminus of PR 362
Dauphin		32.6	20.3	PTH 20 (NWWR) – Winnipegosis, Dauphin; Road 162N – Sifton Beach, Dauphin Lake	Eastern terminus; road continues east as Road 162N
1.000 mi = 1.609 km; 1.000 km = 0.621 mi
