= Ethelbert (disambiguation) =

Ethelbert or Æthelberht is a masculine given name.

Ethelbert may also refer to:

== Places ==
- Ethelbert, Manitoba, Canada
  - Municipality of Ethelbert
  - Rural Municipality of Ethelbert, 1905–2015
  - Ethelbert (electoral district), 1920–1958
- Mount Ethelbert, a mountain in British Columbia, Canada

== Other uses ==
- Ethelbert (orca), a whale that swam up the Columbia River in 1931

== See also ==
- Ethelbert Ridge, Alexander Island, Antarctica
