= Manitoba Provincial Road 275 =

Provincial road in Manitoba, Canada

Provincial Road 275
- Ditch Road
- PR 275 highlighted in red

Route information
- Maintained by Department of Infrastructure
- Length: 23.2 km (14.4 mi)
- Existed: 1966–present

Major junctions
- West end: Highway 753 at Saskatchewan border
- PR 588 south of Big Woody
- East end: PTH 10A in Swan River

Location
- Country: Canada
- Province: Manitoba
- Rural municipalities: Swan Valley West
- Towns: Swan River

Highway system
- Provincial highways in Manitoba; Winnipeg City Routes
| ← PR 274 | → PR 276 |

Provincial Road 275 (PR 275), known locally as Ditch Road, is a provincial road in the Swan River Valley of the Canadian province of Manitoba. It connects the town of Swan River with the Saskatchewan border, where it continues west as Saskatchewan Highway 753 (Hwy 753), and is a paved two-lane highway for its entire length.

== Route description ==
PR 275 serves rural areas west of the town of Swan River. It begins at the Manitoba—Saskatchewan border and intersects with PR 588, just south of the hamlet of Big Woody. Upon entering Swan River, the highway curves sharply and terminates at PTH 10A (Fourth Avenue N), just across the Swan River from downtown. Although the highway is extremely straight, it does cross some hilly terrain and offers views of the Swan River Valley.

== Major intersections ==
| Division | Location | km | mi | Destinations | Notes |
|---|---|---|---|---|---|
| Swan Valley West | | 0.0 | 0.0 | Highway 753 west – Whitebeech | Western terminus; continuation into Saskatchewan |
| Swan Valley West | Crestview | 3.3 | 2.1 | Road 172W – Benito | Former PR 588 south |
| Swan Valley West | | 9.8 | 6.1 | PR 588 north – Big Woody, Whitefish Lake Provincial Park | Southern terminus of PR 588 |
| Swan Valley West | | 12.3 | 7.6 | Bridge over Whitebeech Creek | |
| Swan Valley West | Swan River | 23.2 | 14.4 | PTH 10A (Fourth Avenue N) – Bowsman, Downtown | Eastern terminus |
1.000 mi = 1.609 km; 1.000 km = 0.621 mi

== See also ==
- Saskatchewan Highway 753
