= Manitoba Provincial Road 587 =

Former provincial highway in Manitoba

Provincial Road 587

Route information
- Maintained by Rural Municipality of Minitonas
- Length: 19.65 km (12.21 mi)
- Existed: 1966–2006

Major junctions
- West end: PR 266 in Bowsman
- PR 366
- East end: PR 268

Location
- Country: Canada
- Province: Manitoba

Highway system
- Provincial highways in Manitoba; Winnipeg City Routes
← PR 586	→ PR 588

Provincial Road 587 (PR 587) is a former provincial road in the Canadian province of Manitoba, that was paved with gravel.

== Route description ==
The route began on the east side of Bowsman at PR 266 and ended at PR 268, eleven miles east of the village. Six miles east of Bowsman it intersected PR 366. The route's main purpose was to provide a connection from Bowsman to rural areas east of the village, and eventually to the Lenswood Highway. The route's most important feature was a ford crossing over the Swan River. However in 2006 it was removed due to environmental issues and the fact that it would wash out nearly every spring. Because of this, the road is no longer a direct route to PR 268, and large detours must be made via Lenswood or PR 366 to access areas on the east side of the Swan River.

== History ==
The route is no longer signed as PR 587 ultimately because of the ford crossing decommissioning described above. The portion from Bowsman to Craigsford is now a part of PR 366, which turns south at Craigsford and connects with PTH 10 near Minitonas. This part of the route continues to be heavily used. The portion of the route from Craigsford to the Lenswood Highway has seen a sharp decline in traffic since the ford crossing's removal, especially the easternmost end of the road. It is now used primarily for access to local farmland. Some provincial roadsigns still remain along this part of the route.

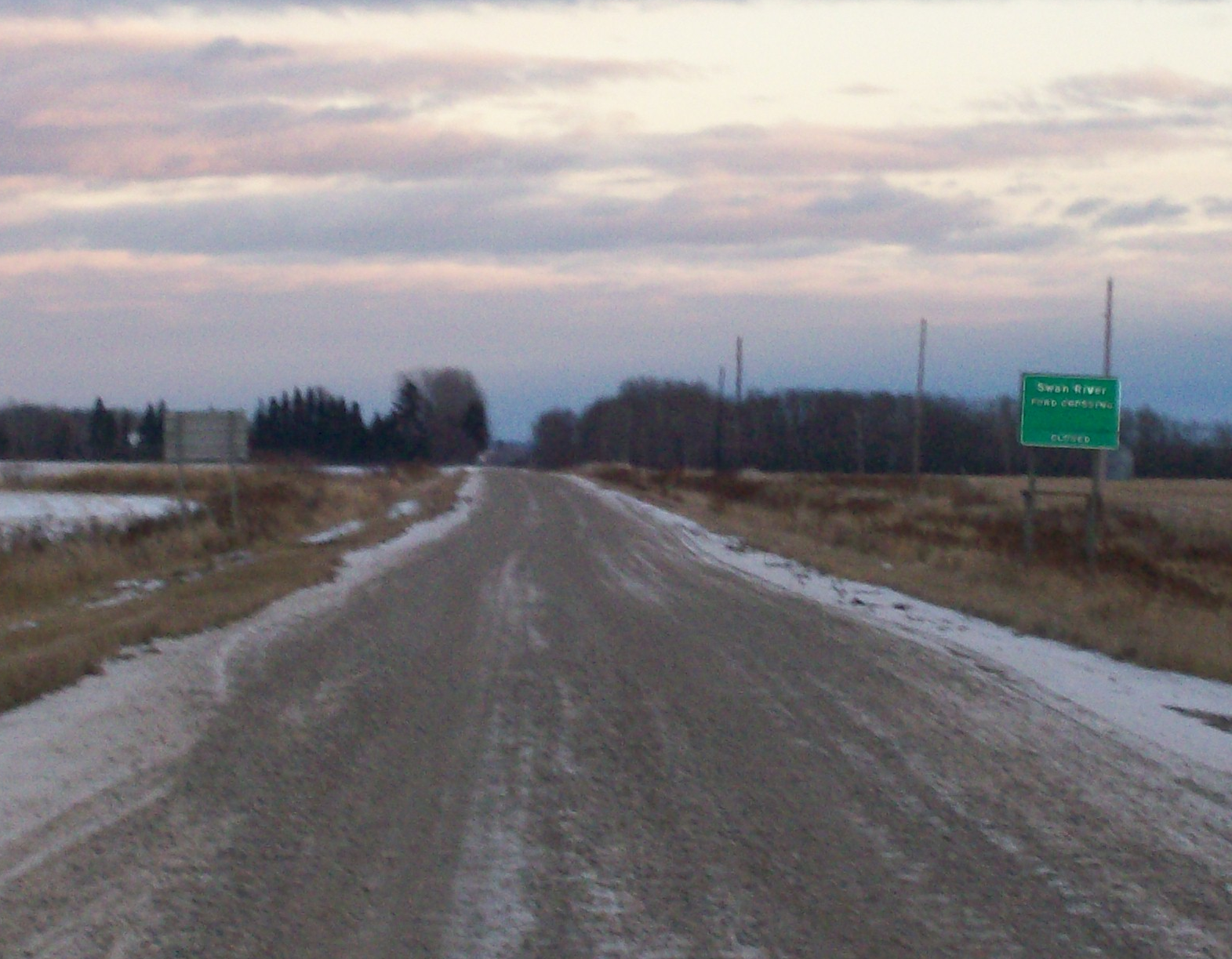
Looking east from the road's junction with PR 366. Note the road closure information sign on the right.
