= ZJN =

ZJN may refer to:

- ZJN, the IATA code for Swan River Airport, Manitoba, Canada
- ZJN, the Pinyin code for Zhenjiang South railway station, Jiangsu, China
