= Manitoba Provincial Road 362 =

Provincial Road in Manitoba, Canada

Provincial Road 362
- PR 362 highlighted in red

Route information
- Maintained by Department of Infrastructure
- Length: 29.0 km (18.0 mi)
- Existed: 1966–present

Major junctions
- South end: PTH 5A / PTH 10A in Dauphin
- PR 491 near Valley River
- North end: PR 267 in Sifton

Location
- Country: Canada
- Province: Manitoba
- Rural municipalities: Dauphin
- Major cities: Dauphin

Highway system
- Provincial highways in Manitoba; Winnipeg City Routes
← PR 361	→ PR 363

Provincial Road 362 (PR 362) is a 29.0-kilometre-long (18.0 mi) north-south highway in the Parkland Region of Manitoba, connecting the hamlets of Sifton and Valley River with the city of Dauphin.

== Route description ==
PR 362 begins in the city of Dauphin at a junction with PTH 5A / PTH 10A (Buchanon Avenue / 2nd Avenue NE) on the northern edge of town, heading north through an industrial area along Keays Street before leaving the city and entering the Rural Municipality of Dauphin. It crosses the Wilson River as it heads through rural farmland, going through a switchback before passing through the hamlet of Valley River along Railway Street. The highway now crosses the river of the same name before having a junction with PR 491. PR 362 continues north through farmland for a few kilometers before entering Sifton and making a sharp left onto 4th Street. Travelling through neighbourhoods, the highway curves onto 2nd Avenue and heads through the centre of downtown, where it comes to an end at a junction with PR 267. The entire length of PR 362 is a paved, two-lane highway.

== Major intersections ==
Division	Location	km	mi	Destinations	Notes
City of Dauphin		0.0	0.0	PTH 5A / PTH 10A (Buchanon Avenue / 2nd Avenue NW) – Dauphin, Roblin	Southern terminus; road continues south as Jackson Street
Dauphin		4.2	2.6	Bridge over the Wilson River	
Dauphin	Valley River	16.0	9.9	Bridge over the Valley River	
Dauphin		16.7	10.4	PR 491 west – Trembowla	Eastern terminus of PR 491
Dauphin	Sifton	29.0	18.0	PR 267	Northern terminus
1.000 mi = 1.609 km; 1.000 km = 0.621 mi

== Related route ==
Provincial Road 491
- Location: Trembowla
- Length: 9.1 km (5.7 mi)
- Existed: 1984–present

Provincial Road 491 (PR 491) is a 9.1-kilometre-long (5.7 mi) east-west spur of PR 362 in the Rural Municipality of Dauphin, providing a connection to small hamlet of Trembowla. It is entirely a two-lane gravel road, with no other major intersections or settlements along its length.

Division	Location	km	mi	Destinations	Notes
Dauphin	Trembowla	0.0	0.0	Road 154N / Road 119W	End of provincial maintenance; western terminus
Dauphin		9.1	5.7	PR 362 – Sifton, Valley River	Eastern terminus
1.000 mi = 1.609 km; 1.000 km = 0.621 mi
