= Swan Valley Regional Secondary School =

Location
- Swan River, Manitoba; Canada; 52°06′40″N 101°15′13″W

Information
- School type: Public, High School
- Motto: Making a difference today for tomorrow
- Founded: 1972
- School district: Swan Valley School Division
- Principal: Jacquie Mydinski-Arp
- Grades: 9-12
- Enrollment: 565 (2013)
- Language: English
- Area: Swan River Valley
- Colours: Red and Navy Blue
- Mascot: Tiger
- Team name: Swan Valley Tigers
- Website: www.svsd.ca/svrss/

Swan Valley Regional Secondary School (SVRSS) is a regional high school located in Swan River, Manitoba. Enrolment fluctuates around 565 students in grades 9–12. It is governed by the Swan Valley School Division and is the only high school in the division.

== History ==
In 1967, all the one room schoolhouses around the Swan River Valley were closed permanently. The SVRSS opened five years later, in 1972, as a replacement for these closed schools. Formerly, students in Swan River attended the Swan River Collegiate Institute, which has now become École Swan River South School, a jr high school. In 2012, the school celebrated its 40th anniversary.
