= Swan River Valley =

Valley in Manitoba, Canada

Coordinates: 52.119°N 101.348°W

The Swan River Valley (also known as Swan Valley) is a valley between the Manitoba Escarpment in the Parkland Region of Manitoba, Canada. It is located between the Porcupine Hills to the northwest and Duck Mountains to the south, as well as Thunderhill to the west and Lake Winnipegosis to the east.

It includes the town of Swan River, and the Minitonas-Bowsman, Swan Valley West, and Mountain rural municipalities. With that being said, however, it has no clearly defined boundaries: although it is close to the Manitoba-Saskatchewan border, the immediate area across the border is sometimes considered a part of the valley by locals, as well. It is named after the Swan River, which runs through the center of the region.

Swan River Valley was recognized as the 1998 Forestry Capital of Canada.

== Communities ==
Manitoba

- Benito
- Bellsite
- Bowsman
- Birch River
- Cowan
- Durban
- Kenville
- Lenswood
- Mafeking
- Minitonas
- Renwer
- Swan River

Saskatchewan

- Arran
- Whitebeech
