= Cowichan knitting =

Form of knitting of the Cowichan people

Thunderbird design

Cowichan knitting is a form of knitting characteristic of the Cowichan people of southeastern Vancouver Island, British Columbia. The distinctively patterned, heavy-knit Cowichan sweaters, popular among British Columbians and tourists, are produced using this method.

Cowichan sweaters are also called Siwash sweaters, Indian sweaters, curling sweaters or sometimes Mary Maxim sweaters. While Cowichan is the name of a specific First Nations group, the word Siwash is borrowed from Chinook Jargon, the historic trade language of the Pacific Northwest. It is derived from sauvage (French for 'wild') and is felt by some to carry derisive connotations.

== History ==
=== Development of the Cowichan sweater ===
Another origin theory is that the Sisters of St. Ann, a Roman Catholic institution founded in Quebec to promote the education of rural children, brought knitting to the West Coast. In 1858, four Sisters of St. Ann traveled from Montreal to Victoria to open a schoolhouse for the local children of all different races. Knitting became part of the instruction of Indigenous girls during the 1860s, both at St. Ann's Academy in Victoria and St. Ann's School for Indian Girls in Duncan.

The classic Cowichan sweater of the 20th century was knitted of white or undyed wool, in coat style, fastened at the front by buttons or a zipper, hip-length, with a shawl collar, and usually ornamented with indigenous or sporting motifs.

== Spread in popularity ==
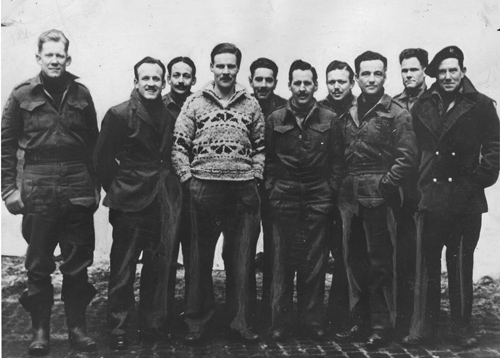
Cecil Merritt as a prisoner of war during WWII (fourth from left) in a knit Cowichan sweater

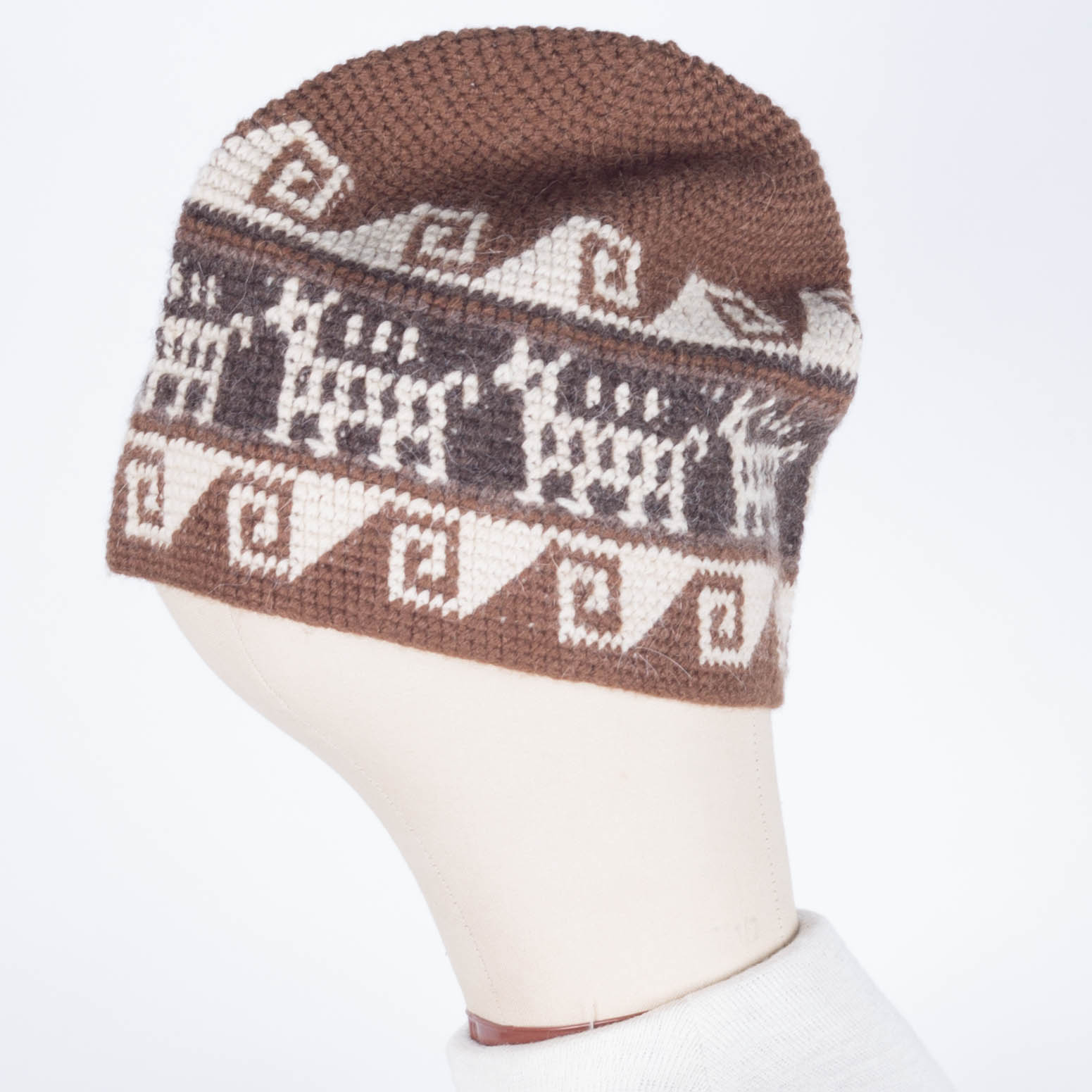
Crochet cap by Ralph Lauren based on traditional Cowichan patterns

By the 1920s, when interest in the sweaters came from outside the Coast Salish community, both companies and private individuals began to imitate the sweater. One of the more famous imitations came from Mary Maxim, a company founded in the 1940s by Willard S. McPhedrain. At first, Mary Maxim started as a woolen mill, but the business soon expanded after McPhedrian traveled to British Columbia on a sales trip and came across a Cowichan sweater.

Today, companies such as Pendleton Woolen Mills, Ralph Lauren, and Aritzia all have their own version of the Cowichan sweater design. In October 2009, the Hudson's Bay Company (HBC) revealed their clothing line for the 2010 Vancouver Winter Olympics, including the Olympic sweater that looked like a Cowichan design.

Linda Hwitsum, the chief of the Cowichan Tribes, called for redress from the HBC on October 21, 2009. Because of the sweater's registered trademark, the Cowichan Tribes began seeking legal advice to determine if it will launch legal action against HBC. Meanwhile, individual Cowichan knitters began to plan a silent protest where demonstrators would wear Cowichan sweaters to the torch relays in Victoria, B.C. and Duncan, B.C. that would take place on October 30 and October 31 respectively. Eventually, a compromise was made between the parties; knitters would have an opportunity to sell their sweaters at the downtown Vancouver HBC store, alongside the imitations.
