= Paulson, Manitoba =

Paulson
- Location of Paulson in Manitoba
- Coordinates: 51°6′55″N 99°55′58″W
- Country: Canada
- Province: Manitoba
- Municipality: RM of Dauphin
- Region: Parkland
- Elevation: 287 m (942 ft)
- Time zone: UTC-6 (CST)
  - Summer (DST): UTC-5 (CDST)
- Area code: 204

Paulson is a locality in Manitoba, Canada. It is located 9 kilometres (6 mi) southeast of Dauphin and 186 miles (299 km) northwest of Winnipeg.

Paulson lies within the Rural Municipality of Dauphin.

== Royal Canadian Air Force ==
RCAF Station Paulson was the site of British Commonwealth Air Training Plan No. 7 Bombing & Gunnery School during World War II.
