= Lake Manitoba Railway and Canal Company =

Railway in Manitoba, Canada

Map

Lake Manitoba Railway and Canal Company (LMR) was a historic rail line in Manitoba, Canada, between Gladstone in the south and Winnipegosis to its north.

== History ==
=== Proposal ===
In 1889, the Lake Manitoba Railway and Canal Company (LMR) received a federal charter to build a 27-kilometre (17 mi) railway branch line from Portage La Prairie north to the southern boundary of Lake Manitoba, to link with existing lake and river steamers, and to build navigable canals to connect Lake Manitoba, Lake Winnipegosis and the North Saskatchewan River. Since railways were better suited than watercraft in meeting the overall transportation needs within the province, the charter's scope changed within a year to a 201-kilometre (125 mi) line from Portage La Prairie to Lake Winnipegosis, at or near Meadow Portage. The standard 6,400 acre-per-mile land grant for railway construction applied. The line was usually called the Dauphin railway, or sometimes the Lake Dauphin railway, to indicate an overall route west of Lake Manitoba. In 1892, the LMR charter was revived to build from Gladstone or Arden to Dauphin. With no progress, the charter owned by Charles Herbert Mackintosh and M.P. Davie lapsed, and new owner, Major Walsh, was unable to argue its renewal.

Despite government urging, railway companies laid no new track on the Prairies during 1893–1895 owing to low returns on the capital investment. In 1895, Clifford Sifton, a provincial cabinet member, spearheaded a new initiative for Manitoba to guarantee railway company bonds issued for new construction within the province, but the existing railways were lukewarm to the concept. However, he discovered Donald Mann, a railway construction contractor, who seeking work, expressed merit in the plan. Mann purchased the LMR charter for $38,000, but to facilitate bank and government financing, he was obliged to take on a strong partner. Joined by William Mackenzie with whom he had worked on Canadian Pacific Railway (CPR) construction, this was their first major collaboration. As contractors, Mackenzie and Mann were prohibited from being railway company directors, but as majority shareholders they controlled the company, and Fred Nicholls served as the first president.

=== Construction ===
The Gladstone–Dauphin section was begun in 1896. Although 55 kilometres (34 mi) longer than a direct route, it offered better traffic prospects. They negotiated a federal subsidy of $8,000 per mile, the land grant, and the former Hudson Bay Railway (HBR) $40,000 annual federal transportation contract if the line reached halfway from Winnipeg to the Saskatchewan River. The Manitoba legislature guaranteed principal and interest on LMR bonds at either 4% or 5% for 30 years for up to $8,000 per mile (about $800,000), and exempted earnings on the line from taxes for the same 30 years. The provincial guarantee, supplementing adequate federal aid for a line that cost only $7,000 a mile to build, prompted ongoing controversy.

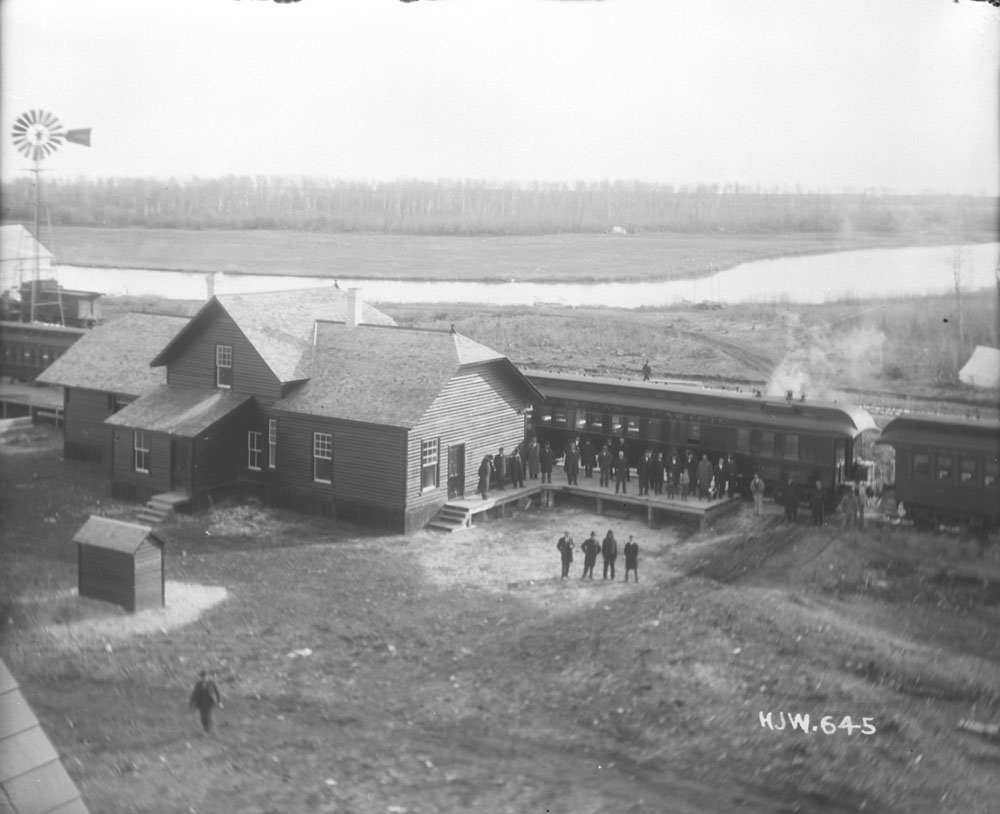
Train station, Winnipegosis, 1897

Wet weather delayed the spring 1896 surveys and early grading. Track laying, which commenced in August, averaged 2.4 kilometres (1.5 mi) a day. At its peak, the project involved 1,200 workers. Work trains carried paying passengers and freight along the finished sections. Telegraph wires were strung well ahead of the track gangs. Two years later, the completion of the Winnipeg–Portage la Prairie telegraph wires connected Winnipeg with the LMR network.

In November, the construction headquarters moved from Gladstone to Dauphin, and work ceased for the season when the 163-kilometre (101 mi) line reached its temporary terminus at Sifton (which activated the federal transportation contract). The destination is sometimes mistakenly reported as Dauphin, an alternative projection. Government inspection and the handover to the LMR occurred in December. That month, David Blyth Hanna was appointed superintendent, and Theodore Arthur Burrows land commissioner for the railway. Burrows was Clifford Sifton's brother-in-law, as was S. Jacks, who was later appointed as Mackenzie and Mann's purchasing agent.

In summer 1897, the line advanced northeast via the future Sifton Junction, Fork River and Gruber to the Winnipegosis terminus. Following special trains that September and October, government inspections were completed, and the LMR assumed possession. The summer 1898 extension of the LMR northwest from Sifton Junction to Cowan forms part of the HBR, whose charter (containing federal grants and guarantees) the LMR principals controlled from 1896.

=== Operation ===
The railway had arranged running rights southward on the Manitoba and North Western Railway (M&NW) for Gladstone to Portage La Prairie, and on CPR, and Northern Pacific and Manitoba Railway (NP&MR) rails from that point. In 1894, CP bested Mackenzie and Mann in acquiring the bankrupt M&NW. In December 1898, the emerging rail network became the Canadian Northern Railway (CNoR). CNoR recognized a need for its own Gladstone–Portage La Prairie link. In 1901, CNoR built Gladstone–Beaver; Northern Pacific and Manitoba (NP&M) built Portage La Prairie–Beaver, which it sold to CNoR that year.

The January 3 to November 8, 1897, timetable showed a Portage la Prairie–Dauphin twice weekly mixed train and a Dauphin–Sifton once weekly freight or mixed. Claims that the line was profitable from its first year onward likely reflected the weaker accounting standards of the era. Railways often selectively capitalized some maintenance costs and grossly under-depreciated capital assets. The November 9, 1897, to December 12, 1898, timetable offered a Portage la Prairie–Winnipegosis twice weekly mixed train.

A new federal charter, granted to CNoR the following year, comprised extensive new routes.

The December 12, 1898, to April 12, 1899, timetable listed a weekly mixed train for each of Portage la Prairie–Winnipegosis and Portage la Prairie–Cowan. From April 13, service increased to twice weekly for the Cowan destination. In subsequent years, The Winnipegosis service varied between once or twice weekly, and Cowan twice or three times weekly. By 1905, Winnipegosis was merely a Dauphin branch line. Service later peaked at daily, reducing to six days a week, three days, two days, and settling at once a week.

During the early years, Winnipegosis passenger and freight traffic flourished. Although the Waterhen River indirectly links to Lake Manitoba, the absence of a suitable connecting channel had previously limited development. The Winnipegosis rail link led to booming industries for fishing on Lake Winnipegosis, and lumber extraction along its shores. Fish and cordwood were key freight items. Steamboats, which carried freight and some passenger traffic, operated until the 1920s. The concept of a Meadow Portage canal resurfaced in 1912, but was not pursued.

To resolve CNoR's dire financial predicament, the federal government effectively took control of the company in 1917, and it later merged into Canadian National Railway (CNR).

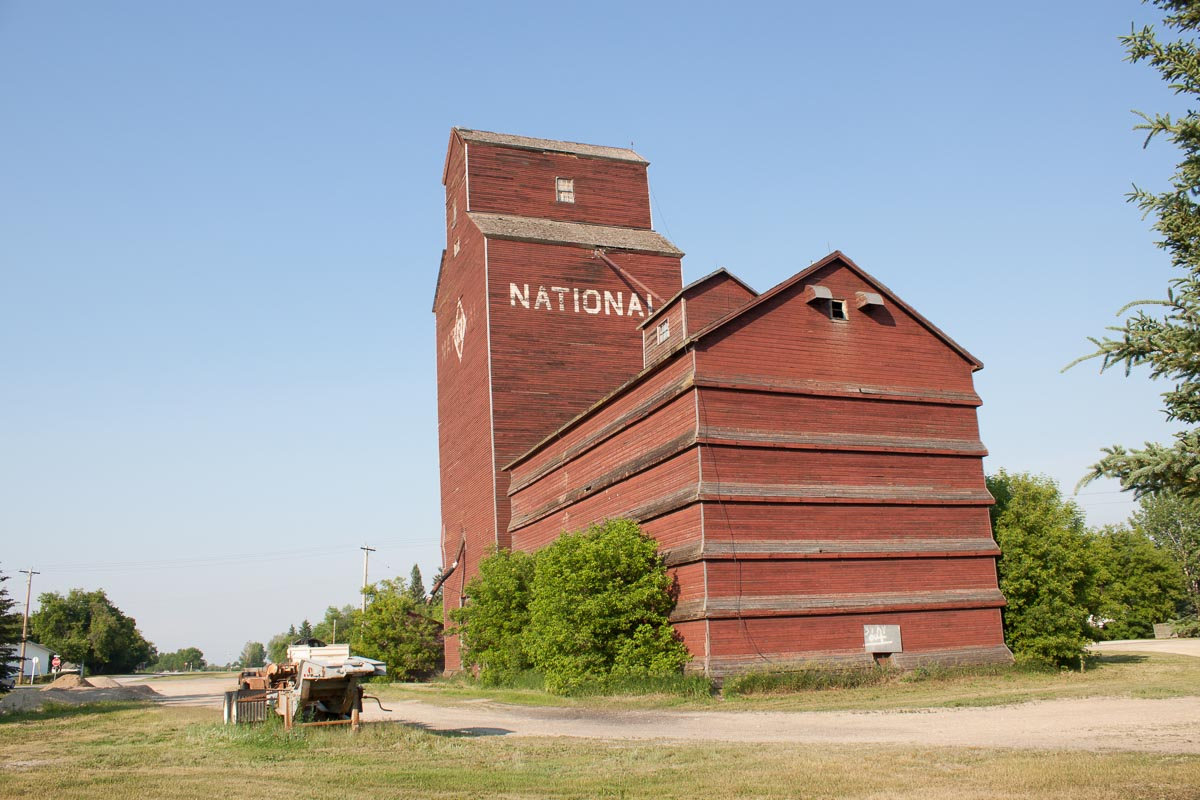
National Grain elevator, Winnipegosis, 2015 (Photographer Steve Boyko)

=== Closure ===
The Winnipegosis train station, built to CNoR plan 100-63 in 1897, has become a museum. As early as 1964, diminished passenger and freight traffic called for the abandonment of the line. In 1975, the CN agent-operator position was eliminated at Winnipegosis. For that entire year, the line carried a total of 15 passengers. In early 1977, the Railway Transport Committee of the Canadian Transport Commission issued its order Number R-24506 authorizing CN to end 80 years of Dauphin–Winnipegosis passenger travel. The final mixed train left Dauphin for Winnipegosis on April 19, returning that afternoon.

With only a weekly freight train to the Winnipegosis grain elevator, the 16.7-kilometre (10.4 mi) Fork River–Winnipegosis section was ordered abandoned, effective March 14, 1983. Contractors removed the track in summer 1985. The Cowan subdivision included North of Dauphin^{a} (Mile 0), Sifton (Mile 13.2), Sifton Junction (Mile 15.0), Garland (Mile 38.7), and Minitonas (Mile 87.3). A torrential downpour in July 1993 washed out the line between Garland and Minitonas, and the damage was never repaired. In 1996, CN announced plans to discontinue or sell its Cowan subdivision and the remainder of Winnipegosis subdivision. The former was abandoned in 2000, and the latter in 1997. These rails have since been lifted.

== Footnotes ==
^a . This scale places Dauphin itself at 4.3 kilometres (2.7 mi) farther south.
