= Rural Municipality of Minitonas =

Rural municipality in Manitoba, Canada

Coordinates: 52°08′36″N 100°58′38″W

The Rural Municipality of Minitonas is a former rural municipality (RM) in the Canadian province of Manitoba. It was originally incorporated as a rural municipality on May 1, 1901. It ceased on January 1, 2015 as a result of its provincially mandated amalgamation with the Town of Minitonas and the Village of Bowsman to form the Municipality of Minitonas – Bowsman.

== Communities ==
- Renwer
