= Mountain View School Division =

School district in Manitoba, Canada

Location
- Parkland Region, Manitoba Canada

District information
- Superintendent: Suzanne Cottyn
- Chair of the board: Jason Gryba
- Schools: 16

Students and staff
- Students: 3,093
- Staff: 545

Other information
- Elected trustees: G. Floyd Martens (Ward 1); Conrad Nabess (Ward 1); Paul Coffey (Ward 2); Scott Lynxleg (Ward 2); Jason Gryba (Ward 3); Gabe Mercier (Ward 3); John Taylor (Ward 4); Tarri Thompson (Ward 4); Kerri Wieler (Ward 4)
- Secretary-Treasurer: Lori Slepicka
- Assistant Superintendent: Kim MacMillan (Acting)
- Website: www.mvsd.ca

Mountain View School Division is in the Parkland Region of Manitoba, bordering the shores of Lake Winnipegosis to the North, stretching from Lake Dauphin in the east to the Saskatchewan border in the west and bordering the Riding Mountains to the south. Mountain View is culturally diverse and consists of approximately 3,000 students in 16 schools in 7 communities (Roblin, Grandview, Gilbert Plains, Dauphin, Ochre River, Ethelbert and Winnipegosis).

== List of schools ==
Schools
School name	Grades Provided
Lt. Colonel Barker VC School	K-6
Henderson School	K-6
Smith-Jackson School	K-6
Mackenzie Middle School	7-8
École Macneill School	K-6
Whitmore School	K-6
Ochre River School	K-8
Winnipegosis Elementary School	K-8
Gilbert Plains Elementary School	K-8
Roblin Elementary School	K-8
Dauphin Regional Comprehensive Secondary School	9-12
Ethelbert School	K-12
Grandview School	K-12
Winnipegosis Collegiate Institute	9-12
Gilbert Plains Collegiate Institute	9-12
Goose Lake High School	9-12
