= Mount Ethelbert =

Mountain in British Columbia, Canada

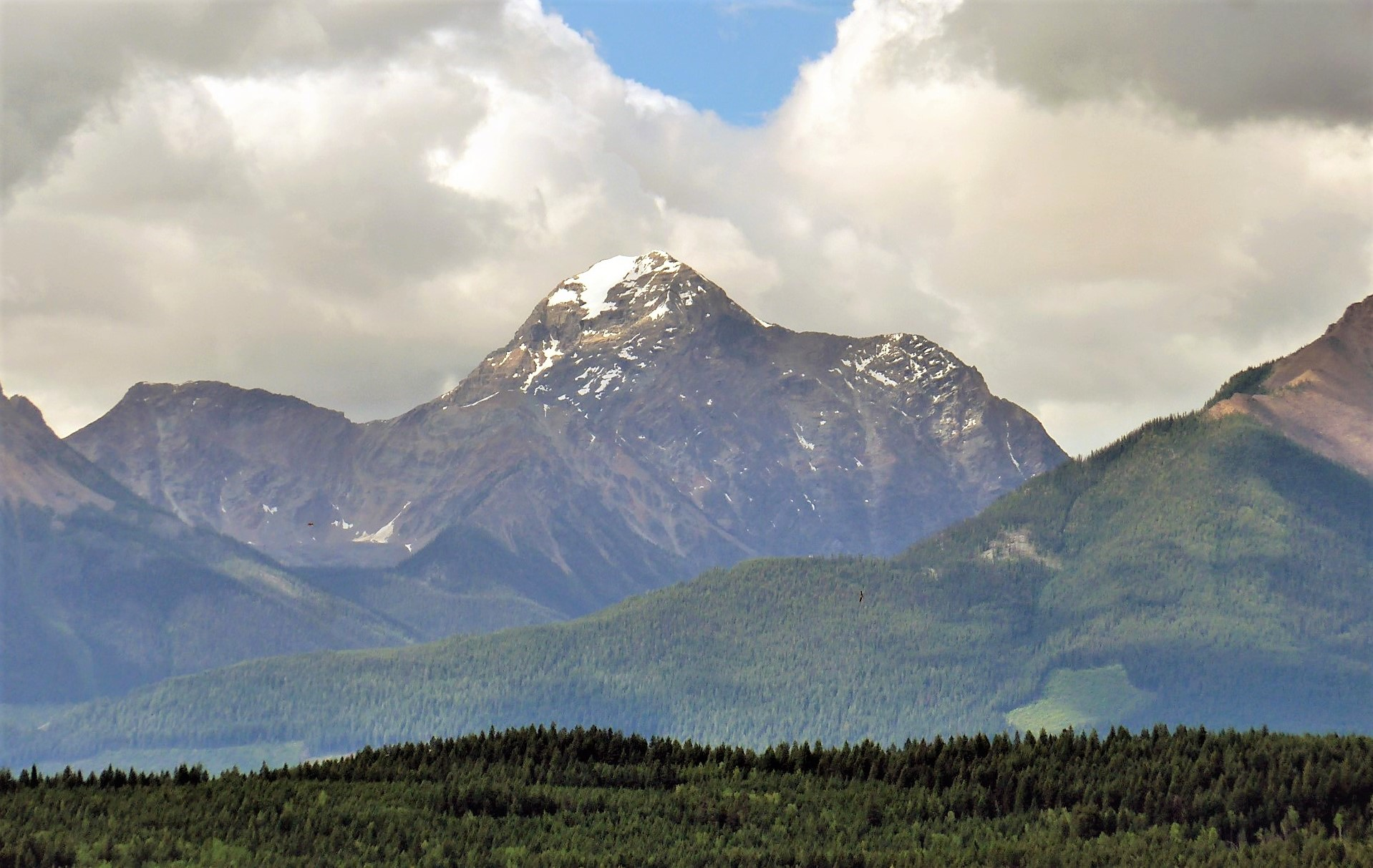
- Northeast aspect

Highest point
- Elevation: 3,176 m (10,420 ft)
- Prominence: 1,036 m (3,399 ft)
- Parent peak: Howser Spire (3,412 m)
- Isolation: 17.6 km (10.9 mi)
- Listing: Mountains of British Columbia
- Coordinates: 50°46′33″N 116°32′40″W

Naming
- Etymology: Sister Ethelbert

Geography
- Location within British Columbia Location within Canada
- Interactive map of Mount Ethelbert
- Country: Canada
- Province: British Columbia
- District: Kootenay Land District
- Parent range: Septet Range; Purcell Mountains
- Topo map: NTS 82K15 Bugaboo Creek

Climbing
- First ascent: July 19, 1915
- Easiest route: Scrambling Southwest ridge

Mount Ethelbert is a 3,176-metre (10,420-foot) mountain summit in British Columbia, Canada.

== Description ==
Mount Ethelbert is located 47 km (29 mi) northwest of Invermere, 19 km (12 mi) southwest of Spillimacheen, and can be seen from BC Highway 95. It is situated on the west side of the Rocky Mountain Trench and east of The Bugaboos. Mount Ethelbert is the highest point of the Septet Range which is a subset of the Purcell Mountains. Precipitation runoff from the mountain drains east to the Columbia River via Dunbar Creek and Templeton River. Mount Ethelbert is notable for its steep rise above local terrain as topographic relief is significant with the summit rising over 1,400 meters (4,593 ft) above the Templeton River valley in 2 km (1.2 mi) and over 1,450 meters (4,757 ft) above Climax Lake in the Dunbar valley in 2 km (1.2 mi).

== History ==
The mountain is named after Sister Ethelbert, the first nun to ascend the upper Columbia River who died aboard Captain Armstrong's river boat, the Ptarmigan. Armstrong named the mountain after her. The toponym was officially adopted on June 9, 1960, by the Geographical Names Board of Canada.

The first ascent of the summit was made in 1915 by Dr. and Mrs. Winthrop Stone, Mr. and Mrs. Albert H. MacCarthy, Herbert Otto Frind, with guide Conrad Kain. Margaret Stone was given the honor of being the first of the group to summit since she was the only member of the party without a prior first ascent to their credit. Six years later tragedy struck when her husband fell to his death while the couple was making the first ascent of Eon Mountain, and she was stranded alone on the mountain for eight days before rescuers arrived.

== Climate ==
Based on the Köppen climate classification, Mount Ethelbert is located in a subarctic climate zone with cold, snowy winters, and mild summers. Winter temperatures can drop below −20 °C with wind chill factors below −30 °C.

== See also ==
- Geography of British Columbia
