= Mafeking, Manitoba =

Mafeking
- Location of Mafeking in Manitoba
- Coordinates: 52°41′1″N 101°6′36″W
- Country: Canada
- Province: Manitoba
- Region: Parkland Region
- Census Division: No. 20

Government
  - Governing Body: Rural Municipality of Mountain Council
  - MP: Dan Mazier
  - MLA: Rick Wowchuk
- Time zone: UTC−6 (CST)
  - Summer (DST): UTC−5 (CDT)
- Postal Code: R0L 1B0
- Area code: 204
- NTS Map: 063C11
- GNBC Code: GAPTY

Mafeking is a local urban district in the Rural Municipality of Mountain, Manitoba, Canada. It is located approximately 65 kilometres (40 mi) north of Swan River, Manitoba.

The town shares its name with Mahikeng (formerly spelled Mafeking) in South Africa, after which it was named in commemoration of the famous siege and relief of Mafeking during the Second Boer War.
