= Swan River Airport =

Airport in Manitoba, Canada

- IATA: ZJN; ICAO: CZJN

Summary
- Airport type: Public
- Operator: Swan Valley Airport Commission
- Location: RM of Swan River, near Swan River, Manitoba
- Time zone: CST (UTC−06:00)
  - Summer (DST): CDT (UTC−05:00)
- Elevation AMSL: 1,100 ft / 335 m
- Coordinates: 52°07′17″N 101°14′04″W
- Website: Swan River Airport

Map
- Location in Manitoba CZJN (Canada)

Runways
Direction	Length		Surface
Direction	ft	m	Surface
02/20	3,935	1,199	Asphalt
08/26	1,957	596	Grass / asphalt
- Source: Canada Flight Supplement

Swan River Airport (IATA: ZJN, ICAO: CZJN) is located adjacent to Swan River, Manitoba, Canada.

Scheduled flights to Winnipeg were formerly provided by Keystone Air Service, which discontinued service sometime between 2004 and 2005.

The airport has private charter services and emergency flights to Winnipeg.

== See also ==
- List of airports in Manitoba
