= Mary Maxim =

Craft and needlework mail-order company

Mary Maxim is the largest privately held craft and needlework mail-order company in North America. It has an office currently in Paris, Ontario with its headquarters based out of Port Huron, Michigan and a retail store at 75 Scott Ave, Paris, Ontario. The Port Huron, Michigan retail store has permanently closed, though the office remains open. It specializes in selling crafts, yarns, knitting/crocheting kits and other hobby related items.

== History ==
Mary Maxim's roots can be traced back to Sifton, Manitoba, Canada, where Willard and Olive McPhedrain purchased Spinwell Manufacturing Co who had been manufacturing and selling spinning wheels. Willard soon began a mail order company titled "Sifton Products." In 1954 Willard began to search for new locations for his business and ended up in Paris, Ontario. The name was changed to Mary Maxim, after a store employee: Mary Maximchuk. Willard decided to take Betty Crocker's example by naming the company after a girl who helped around the household. Mary's name was shortened and the store name: Mary Maxim, was born. In 1956 after recognizing the customer potential in the United States, Willard's son Larry established an office in Port Huron, Michigan.

Mary Maxim was first recognized for their quality knitting yarns. In the late 1950s they became increasingly popular for their bulky, knit sweaters with designs influenced by North American Wildlife. The first sweater pattern was designed in 1951 by Stella Sawchyn.

== Celebrity attention ==
- Bob Hope was photographed wearing a Mary Maxim totem pole design sweater in 1953 while visiting Canada.
- The Barenaked Ladies wore Mary Maxim Sweaters on their 2004 holiday album.
- Miss Outdoors 1957 was photographed wearing a Mary Maxim sweater.
- Angela Lansbury as Jessica Fletcher wore a Mary Maxim sweater in Episode 2 of the first series of Murder, She Wrote.
- Ryan Gosling as Dr. Ryland Grace wore a Mary Maxim sweater in the 2026 sci-fi film Project Hail Mary.

== Mary Maxim today ==
Currently, Mary Maxim employs and 60 people in Paris, Ontario. Ontario accounts for 15% sales from retail stores and 85% from the catalog division.

Mary Maxim has looked to the internet to increase profits. They can attribute 25% of their sales to internet selling.

Mary Maxim is now owned by the third and fourth generation of McPhedrains: Rusty and Jane and their sons Chad and Mitch. Rusty became vice president of operations in 1987 and president in 1995. Mary Maxim celebrated their 50th anniversary in June 2006.
