= Rural Municipality of Ethelbert =

Rural municipality in Manitoba, Canada

Coordinates: 51°32′11″N 100°29′53″W

The Rural Municipality of Ethelbert is a former rural municipality (RM) in the Canadian province of Manitoba. It was originally incorporated as a rural municipality on March 1, 1905. It ceased on January 1, 2015 as a result of its provincially mandated amalgamation with the Town of Ethelbert to form the Municipality of Ethelbert.

The westernmost approximately one-quarter of the former RM lay within Duck Mountain Provincial Forest. It was the largest area of the forest that lay within any single rural municipality.

== Communities ==
- Garland
- Mink Creek
