= Renwer =

Human settlement in Manitoba, Canada

Coordinates: 52°05′51″N 100°48′47″W

Renwer is a small, unorganized hamlet in the Municipality of Minitonas – Bowsman, located 9 miles east of Minitonas.

The Duck Mountains are just a couple miles south of the townsite. Renwer was originally known as Fisher Siding.

== History ==
The railroad arrived in 1899, and a school was built in 1914. Around the turn of the century there was a large sawmill operating south of Renwer, but it was destroyed by fire in 1902. The first church, St. Joseph's Roman Catholic Church, was built in 1917. A grain elevator operated by United Grain Growers was brought in pieces to Renwer in 1935 but was closed in April 1977. Renwer also had two general stores a pool hall a community hall a flour-mill stockyard passenger rail station ice rink and post office.

== Present times ==
Most of the buildings are located along Melinda Road, which runs parallel to the old railbed. Melinda Road is lit by four streetlights, and remnants of an old sidewalk run along the north side of the street. A post office is the only business that is left. The old school is closed, but still stands. A 300m paved access road connects Renwer with PTH10. The speed limit in Renwer is 50 km/h.

== Notable residents ==
- Gil Hayes, professional wrestler
