= Craigsford, Manitoba =

Coordinates: 52°13′55″N 101°03′55″W

Craigsford is a district in the Canadian province of Manitoba in the Rural Municipality of Minitonas. The district's center is located at the junction of PR 366 and the former PR 587. There is no townsite, and no real boundaries to the district. However, its name appears on maps and road signs. PR 366 is sometimes called Craigsford Road.

== Archaeological findings ==
There are six archaeological dig sites in Craigsford. Pottery dating from 1350 to 1500 AD has been found in the area. It is a unique type of pottery associated with a fishing station on the Swan River. It has not yet been determined what type of people used this station.
