= Sifton, Manitoba =

Unincorporated community in the Virden region, Manitoba, Canada

Coordinates: 51°21′37″N 100°08′33″W

- Location in Manitoba, Canada
- Country: Canada
- Province: Manitoba
- Municipality: Rural Municipality of Dauphin
- Region: Parkland

Area
  - Total: 839.5 km^{2} (324.1 sq mi)

Population (2021)
  - Total: 1,239
  - Density: 1.476/km^{2} (3.823/sq mi)
- Time zone: UTC-6 (CST)
  - Summer (DST): UTC-5 (CDT)

Sifton is an unincorporated community located in the Rural Municipality of Dauphin in the Canadian province of Manitoba. The community is approximately 20 km north of Dauphin in the Parkland area.

== History ==
Large influxes of Ukrainians settled this region in the mid-1890s, part of a mass immigration undertaken by the federal government. Sifton is named after Minister of the Interior Clifford Sifton, who viewed farmers from Eastern Europe as ideal for settling and opening the Canadian West. About 250 families both in town and in the surrounding countryside today call Sifton, Manitoba their home.

A spinning wheel mounted on a cairn in town is the only visible reminder today that Sifton is also the birthplace of Canada's 1950s fashion item, the Mary Maxim sweater.

Sifton was once a hub of woolen milling in Manitoba. Local residents still speak of the village blacksmith, John Weselowski, in the early 1930s, going broke trying to shoe horses for a living, who, with his brother George started manufacturing spinning wheels instead. It was a stroke of business genius and it sparked a major industry for Sifton, even during the Depression. It led to the construction of Spin-Well Mfg. Co. here and its eventual expansion into producing woollen products, including heavy yarn for sweaters and socks. The blacksmith, John Weselowski, eventually partnered with Willard McPhedrain, a community promoter and CN agent at the time, who had the idea of creating knitting patterns with Canadian symbols. It was McPhedrain who founded the Mary Maxim Co., bestowing on his company a name derived from the shortened version of a domestic in his household: a local girl named Mary Maximchuk.

Sifton was, during those years, also a centre of other industry, including flour milling. It had several mills, plus elevators, numerous stores, cafés, a lumberyard.

The town's fortunes began to reverse in the late 1950s. Mary Maxim Co. eventually left Sifton, and relocated, first to Dauphin, MB and then to Paris, Ontario. One by one the town's flour mills disappeared. A terrible fire in 1949 destroyed several businesses on Main Street. Railways were abandoned. Farms got larger and people more mobile. Children from Sifton's large families left for education and fortune elsewhere, frequently Dauphin, which became the major economic centre of the Parklands.

== Transportation ==
Sifton was served by the Lake Manitoba Railway and Canal Company, which later became part of the Canadian Northern Railway. It is currently accessible via both Provincial Road 267 and Provincial Road 362.

== Geography ==
- Area: 768.27 km^{2} (296.65 mi^{2})
- Location: Southwest Manitoba
- Area Code: +1-204
