= Birch River, Manitoba =

Local urban district in Manitoba, Canada

Coordinates: 52°23′46″N 101°06′14″W

Location of Birch River in Manitoba

Birch River is a local urban district in the northern portion of the Rural Municipality of Mountain, Manitoba, Canada. It is around 40 kilometers from Swan River, Manitoba.

== Demographics ==
In the 2021 Census of Population conducted by Statistics Canada, Birch River had a population of 144 living in 80 of its 96 total private dwellings, a change of −27.3% from its 2016 population of 198. With a land area of 1.84 km^{2} (0.71 sq mi), it had a population density of 78.3/km^{2} (202.7/sq mi) in 2021.

== Attractions ==
The 183-hectare Birch River Ecological Reserve is located within Porcupine Provincial Forest, just two kilometres north of the community of Birch River. Passive visits on foot are allowed without a permit. All other activities require prior approval.

== Climate ==
Climate data for Birch River
Month	Jan	Feb	Mar	Apr	May	Jun	Jul	Aug	Sep	Oct	Nov	Dec	Year
Record high °C (°F)	11.1 (52.0)	10.6 (51.1)	22.5 (72.5)	31.7 (89.1)	39.4 (102.9)	35.5 (95.9)	37.2 (99.0)	35.6 (96.1)	35.5 (95.9)	29.5 (85.1)	20 (68)	13 (55)	39.4 (102.9)
Mean daily maximum °C (°F)	−13.8 (7.2)	−8.5 (16.7)	−1.1 (30.0)	8.9 (48.0)	17.4 (63.3)	21.9 (71.4)	24.4 (75.9)	23.4 (74.1)	16.9 (62.4)	10 (50)	−2.6 (27.3)	−9.8 (14.4)	7.3 (45.1)
Daily mean °C (°F)	−19.8 (−3.6)	−14.6 (5.7)	−7.4 (18.7)	2.5 (36.5)	10.3 (50.5)	15 (59)	17.7 (63.9)	16.4 (61.5)	10.5 (50.9)	4.3 (39.7)	−7.1 (19.2)	−15.2 (4.6)	1.1 (34.0)
Mean daily minimum °C (°F)	−25.7 (−14.3)	−20.7 (−5.3)	−13.3 (8.1)	−3.9 (25.0)	3.1 (37.6)	8.1 (46.6)	11 (52)	9.3 (48.7)	4.1 (39.4)	−1.3 (29.7)	−11.4 (11.5)	−20.4 (−4.7)	−5.1 (22.8)
Record low °C (°F)	−48.3 (−54.9)	−44.4 (−47.9)	−37.8 (−36.0)	−33.3 (−27.9)	−11 (12)	−3.3 (26.1)	1.1 (34.0)	−2.5 (27.5)	−10.6 (12.9)	−23 (−9)	−37 (−35)	−45 (−49)	−48.3 (−54.9)
Average precipitation mm (inches)	22.5 (0.89)	20 (0.8)	31.5 (1.24)	31 (1.2)	47.6 (1.87)	86.6 (3.41)	80.8 (3.18)	64.9 (2.56)	60.8 (2.39)	31.3 (1.23)	27.8 (1.09)	25.5 (1.00)	530.3 (20.88)
Source: Environment Canada
