= Minitonas =

- Unincorporated urban community

- Location in Manitoba, Canada
- Coordinates: 52.0861°N 101.0392°W
- Country: Canada
- Province: Manitoba
- Founded: 1898
- Incorporated as a village: 1948
- Incorporated as a town: 1996

Population (2011)
  - Total: 522
- Website: Former Town of Minitonas

Minitonas is an unincorporated urban community in the Municipality of Minitonas – Bowsman, Manitoba, Canada. It is surrounded by the Swan Valley and is located 15 km east of the Town of Swan River. The community is close to the Duck Mountain Provincial Park.

Founded in 1898, it was categorized as a town from 1996 until 1 January 2015, when it was amalgamated with the Rural Municipality of Minitonas and Village of Bowsman. According to the 2011 census, Minitonas had a population of 522.

== History ==
The Cowan Trail was blazed from Dauphin to Minitonas in 1897, and still exists today. A campsite of tents was established on the West Favel River, southwest of the present community site in 1898. In 1899, the community was moved to its present site along the railway. A cairn marks the original location of the tent town.

The earliest settlers came from the British Isles, Eastern Canada, and the US. In the late 1920s, there was a wave of Czechoslovak, Ukrainian, German, and Polish immigrants. Immigration continued during World War II, and into the 1950s. The Rural Municipality of Minitonas was incorporated in 1901; followed by the Village of Minitonas being incorporated in 1948, and gaining town status in 1996.

On 1 January 2015, the Town of Minitonas was amalgamated with the RM of Minitonas and Village of Bowsman to form the Municipality of Minitonas – Bowsman. Since then, Minitonas has been categorized as an unincorporated urban community.

== Demographics ==
In the 2021 Census of Population conducted by Statistics Canada, Minitonas had a population of 465 living in 228 of its 257 total private dwellings, a change of 0% from its 2016 population of 465. With a land area of 2.19 km^{2} (0.85 sq mi), it had a population density of 212.3/km^{2} (549.9/sq mi) in 2021.

== Amenities and lifestyle ==
Schools in Minitonas are governed by the Swan Valley School Division #35. The one public school in the community is called Minitonas School, serving kindergarten to Grade 8. The former Minitonas Middle Years School had been nominated in the past as one of Canada's best schools.

=== Economy ===
Forestry and agriculture are the two main industries. In 1996, Louisiana-Pacific opened an OSB mill in the Rural Municipality of Minitonas, creating many new jobs. The Mill is located three miles east of the community on PTH 10. Despite Minitonas' close proximity to the much larger town of Swan River, it offers many services. There is one school, a community store (which includes a Swan Valley Credit Union agency), a library, post office, liquor outlet, hotel, and a restaurant.

=== Transportation ===
The community is located just south of Manitoba Highway 10 on Provincial Road 366. Minitonas is sometimes known as the Northern Gateway to the Duck Mountains, as PR 366 leads directly to Duck Mountain Provincial Park. A CN rail line runs through the community also, terminating at the Louisiana-Pacific mill.

=== Recreation ===
In the community itself there is an arena with artificial ice. Between the one school, four baseball diamonds, three soccer fields, and two playgrounds are found. A sportsground is located at the northern edge of the community. It includes four more baseball diamonds, a concession, and non modern washrooms. A hiking trail follows the East Favel River. Numerous parks and benches are scattered through the community as well.

In the municipality, groomed snowmobile trails can be found. Duck Mountain Provincial Park is 29 kilometers south of Minitonas. Hunting and Fishing are big attractions of the area. A mile west of community is Centennial Park, a picnic area at the original location of the tent town.
