= Municipality of Minitonas–Bowsman =

Rural municipality in Manitoba, Canada

Minitonas–Bowsman
- Rural municipality
- Municipality of Minitonas–Bowsman
- Location of the RM of Minitonas–Bowsman in Manitoba
- Coordinates: 52°08′36″N 100°58′38″W
- Country: Canada
- Province: Manitoba
- Region: Parkland
- Incorporated (amalgamated): January 1, 2015

Government
  - Reeve: Walter Pacamaniuk

Area
  - Total: 1,199.17 km^{2} (463.00 sq mi)

Population (2021)
  - Total: 1,587
  - Density: 1.323/km^{2} (3.428/sq mi)
- Time zone: UTC-6 (CST)
  - Summer (DST): UTC-5 (CDT)
- Postal codes: R0L 1G0; R0L 0H0
- Website: minitonas-bowsman.ca

The Municipality of Minitonas–Bowsman is a rural municipality (RM) in the Parkland Region of Manitoba, Canada. More precisely, it is located in the Swan Valley area.

== History ==
The RM was incorporated on January 1, 2015 via the amalgamation of the RM of Minitonas, the Town of Minitonas and the Village of Bowsman. It was formed as a requirement of The Municipal Amalgamations Act, which required that municipalities with a population less than 1,000 amalgamate with one or more neighbouring municipalities by 2015. The Government of Manitoba initiated these amalgamations in order for municipalities to meet the 1997 minimum population requirement of 1,000 to incorporate a municipality.

== Communities ==
Constituent communities of the Municipality of Minitonas–Bowsman include:

- Bowsman (unincorporated urban community)
- Minitonas (unincorporated urban community)
- Renwer (unorganized hamlet)

== Demographics ==
In the 2021 Census of Population conducted by Statistics Canada, Minitonas–Bowsman had a population of 1,587 living in 691 of its 758 total private dwellings, a change of −4% from its 2016 population of 1,653. With a land area of 1,199.17 km^{2} (463.00 sq mi), it had a population density of 1.3/km^{2} (3.4/sq mi) in 2021.
