= Municipality of Ethelbert =

Rural municipality in Manitoba, Canada

Ethelbert
- Rural municipality
- Municipality of Ethelbert
- Location of the Municipality of Ethelbert in Manitoba
- Coordinates: 51.507°N 100.525°W
- Country: Canada
- Province: Manitoba
- Region: Parkland
- Incorporated (amalgamated): January 1, 2015

Area
  - Total: 1,136.94 km^{2} (438.97 sq mi)

Population (2021)
  - Total: 607
  - Density: 0.534/km^{2} (1.38/sq mi)
- Time zone: UTC-6 (CST)
  - Summer (DST): UTC-5 (CDT)
- Website: ethelbert.ca

The Municipality of Ethelbert is a rural municipality (RM) in the Canadian province of Manitoba.

== History ==
The RM was incorporated on January 1, 2015 via the amalgamation of the RM of Ethelbert and the Town of Ethelbert. It was formed as a requirement of The Municipal Amalgamations Act, which required that municipalities with a population less than 1,000 amalgamate with one or more neighbouring municipalities by 2015. The Government of Manitoba initiated these amalgamations in order for municipalities to meet the 1997 minimum population requirement of 1,000 to incorporate a municipality.

== Communities ==
- Ethelbert (unincorporated urban community)
- Garland
- Mink Creek

== Demographics ==
In the 2021 Census of Population conducted by Statistics Canada, Ethelbert had a population of 648 living in 290 of its 366 total private dwellings, a change of 6.8% from its 2016 population of 607. With a land area of 1,134.59 km^{2} (438.07 sq mi), it had a population density of 0.6/km^{2} (1.5/sq mi) in 2021.
