= Rural Municipality of Dauphin =

Rural municipality in Manitoba, Canada

Dauphin
- Rural municipality
- Rural Municipality of Dauphin
- Location of Dauphin in Manitoba
- Coordinates: 51°11′57″N 100°03′48″W
- Country: Canada
- Province: Manitoba
- Region: Parkland
- Incorporated: November 26, 1897

Area
  - Total: 1,516.59 km^{2} (585.56 sq mi)

Population (2016)
  - Total: 2,388
  - Density: 1.575/km^{2} (4.078/sq mi)
- Time zone: UTC-6 (CST)
  - Summer (DST): UTC-5 (CDT)
- Website: rmofdauphin.ca

Dauphin is a rural municipality in the Parkland Region of Manitoba, Canada. The municipality surrounds the separately administered city of Dauphin, and lies just north of Riding Mountain National Park, part of which extends into the RM.

== Communities ==
- Keld
- North Junction
- Paulson
- Sifton
- Trembowla
- Valley River

== Demographics ==
In the 2021 Census of Population conducted by Statistics Canada, Dauphin had a population of 2,136 living in 896 of its 1,023 total private dwellings, a change of −7% from its 2016 population of 2,298. With a land area of 1,512.79 km^{2} (584.09 sq mi), it had a population density of 1.4/km^{2} (3.7/sq mi) in 2021.

== Transportation ==
=== Air ===
Dauphin Municipal Airport

- Regional airport
- Paved runways of 2,750 and 5,000 feet (1,500 m) long
- Daily service to Winnipeg
- Perimeter Airlines
- Night and all-weather facilities
- Avgas and aircraft maintenance
- Capable of landing 737 and Hercules Transport

=== Rail ===
- Canadian National Rail Secondary Mainline
- Via Rail passenger service

=== Road ===
- Provincial Trunk Highways #5, #10, and #20

== Energy & communications ==
Hydro electricity

- 3-phase power supply
- Provided by Manitoba Hydro

Natural gas

- 3" Natural Gas Line (49,560 mcf )
- Provided by Manitoba Hydro

Communications

- Digital tower, DSL High-Speed Internet
- Provided by Bell MTS, I-Netlink and Xplornet
- WCGtv provided by Westman Communications Group

== Water & waste management ==
Water supply source

- Edwards Lake/Creek System and Vermillion Reservoir

Waste management

- Total capacity of storage site is 196 million imperial gallons (890,000 m^{3})
- Currently operating at 75% capacity
- $2.5 million upgrading 2003 and 2005
- 2 landfills (one at Sifton; one shared with City of Dauphin)
- Recycling program

== Industrial park ==
- Fully Serviced
- Land available in Sifton, Dauphin and other areas

== Education ==
- Serviced by the Mountain View School Division
- Total K-12 School Enrollment: 1,769 (as of February 2009)
- Ecole MacNeill K-6 School: 149
- Henderson Elementary: 239
- Barker K-6 School 269
- Smith-Jackson K-6 School 95
- Whitmore K-6 School 127
- Mackenzie Middle 7-8 School 274
- Dauphin Regional Comprehensive School 616

Post-secondary schools:

- Assiniboine Community College (Dauphin) varies
- Campus Manitoba (Dauphin) varies

== Services ==
Fire department

As of 2003:

- Total of 35 member volunteers
- 1 rural tanker
- 4 pumper trucks
- 1 aerial ladder
- 3 rescue wagons
- 1 portable trailer
- 1 kodiak rescue boat
- 1 snowmobile rescue sleigh
- jaws-of-life

Ambulance

- 4 ambulances
- 24-hour service
- Advanced life support service

Police

- Royal Canadian Mounted Police (RCMP)
- 24-hour service
- Rural Crime Watch program

Post office

- Full Service

== Local media ==
- Dauphin Herald newspaper (weekly)
- Parkland Shopper newspaper (weekly)
- 730 CKDM radio (Dauphin)

== Health ==
Dauphin Regional Health Centre:

- 107 beds
- Laboratory testing, x-ray, EKG, CT scanner, hemodialysis, ultra-sound, fluoroscopy, medical and surgical wards
- Intensive Care Unit
- Parkland Family Medicine Residency Program
- Community Health Services
- 911 emergency services

Special care services

- Doctors: 21 and visiting medical staff available
- Dentists: 8
- Optometrists: 3
- Chiropractors: 4
- Personal Care Home: 70 beds
- Other Services: Handi-van
- Home Care & Meals on Wheels
- Telehealth

== Recreation ==
- Parkland Recreation Complex:
- Curling rink - 6 sheets of ice
- Indoor leisure & waved pool, waterslide, 2 indoor arenas,
- 1 outdoor arena
- 18-hole golf course (RM of Ochre River)
- Beach and campgrounds
- Vermillion Park Sportsplex (baseball & soccer)
- Selo Ukraina amphitheatre (10,000 seats)
- International festivals: National Ukrainian Festival, Countryfest, and Dauphin's Christian Music Festival (Jesus Manifest)
- Historical sites and district museums
- Dauphin Bible Camp
