= Rural Municipality of Mountain =

Rural municipality in Manitoba, Canada

Mountain
- Rural municipality
- Rural Municipality of Mountain
- Location of the Rural Municipality of Mountain in Manitoba
- Interactive map of Mountain
- Coordinates: 52°16′27″N 100°36′30″W
- Country: Canada
- Province: Manitoba
- Region: Parkland
- Incorporated as an LGD: January 1, 1945
- Incorporated as an RM: January 1, 1997

Government
  - Reeve: Robert Hanson

Area
  - Land: 2,607.77 km^{2} (1,006.87 sq mi)

Population (2016)
  - Total: 978
- Website: rmofmountain.com

The Rural Municipality of Mountain is a rural municipality (RM) in the Parkland Region of Manitoba, western Canada.

Its 2,607 square kilometres (1,007 sq mi) is split geographically into two large sections—Mountain (North) at 52°34′48″N 101°00′54″W, and Mountain (South) at 51°58′21″N 100°23′31″W—separated by approximately 10 km (6.2 mi) at the northeast corner of Municipality of Minitonas – Bowsman.

The municipality, which was named for the nearby Porcupine and Duck Mountains, sits along the east side of both the Porcupine Provincial Forest in the north and the Duck Mountain Provincial Forest in the south.

Its largest communities are the local urban districts of Pine River, Birch River, and Mafeking.

== Communities ==
The constituent communities of the Rural Municipality of Mountain include the following.

Mountain (South):

- Cowan
- Pine River
- Pulp River

Mountain (North):

- Bellsite
- Birch River
- Lenswood
- Mafeking
- Novra
- Sclater

== Demographics ==
North part

In the 2021 Census of Population conducted by Statistics Canada, the north portion of the RM of Mountain had a population of 537 living in 257 of its 297 total private dwellings, a change of −3.9% from its 2016 population of 559. With a land area of 988.01 km^{2} (381.47 sq mi), it had a population density of 0.5/km^{2} (1.4/sq mi) in 2021.

South part

In the 2021 Census of Population conducted by Statistics Canada, the south portion of the RM of Mountain had a population of 443 living in 187 of its 250 total private dwellings, a change of 5.7% from its 2016 population of 419. With a land area of 1,615.42 km^{2} (623.72 sq mi), it had a population density of 0.3/km^{2} (0.7/sq mi) in 2021.

Combined

In the 2021 Census of Population conducted by Statistics Canada, the RM of Mountain had a combined population of 980 living in 444 of its 547 total private dwellings, a change of 0.2% from its 2016 population of 978. With a land area of 2,603.43 km^{2} (1,005.19 sq mi), it had a population density of 0.4/km^{2} (1.0/sq mi) in 2021.
