= Bowsman =

- Unincorporated urban community
- Location of Bowsman in Manitoba
- Coordinates: 52.1409°N 101.1226°W
- Country: Canada
- Province: Manitoba
- Municipality: Minitonas-Bowsman
- Incorporated: 1949

Population (2021)
  - Total: . 237
- Postal code: R0L 0H0

Bowsman is an unincorporated urban community in the Municipality of Minitonas – Bowsman, Manitoba, Canada.

The community is 16 kilometres north of the Town of Swan River. Bowsman was originally incorporated as a village in 1949, but lost that status upon its amalgamation with the Rural Municipality of Minitonas on 1 January 2015.

The economy is supported by agriculture and logging. Currently the community offers a hotel with restaurant, lounge, and bar, K–8 school, hockey arena, curling rink, 3 baseball diamonds, library, post office.

== History ==
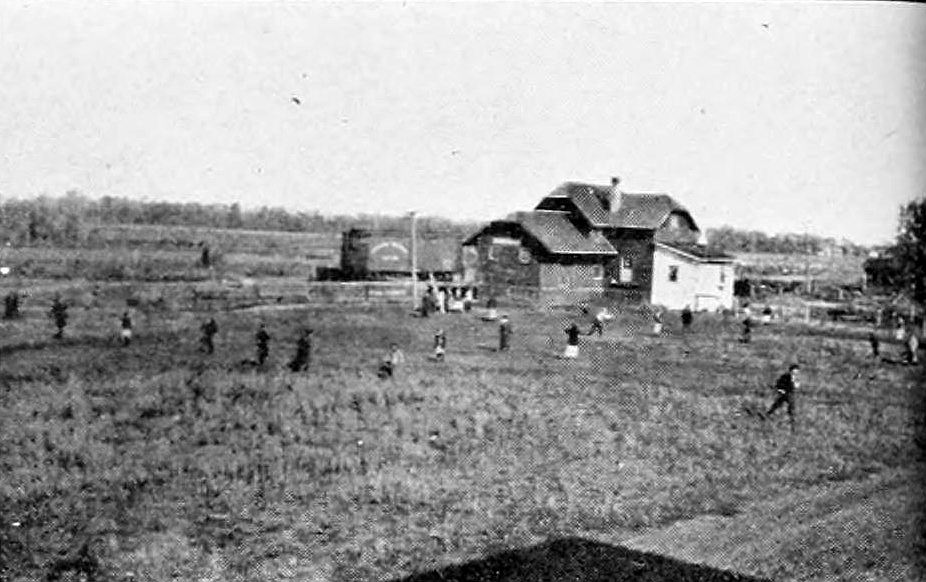
Bowsman School, 1914

Bowsman was originally incorporated as a village in 1949. J.B. Tyrell, a surveyor, came up with the name "Bowsman" after the first man out of the bow of the boat who touched the land. Originally known as "Bowsman River" because of the river, the name was shortened to Bowsman in 1952.

From 1948-1953 Bowsman had a semi-pro baseball team. From 1952 to 1955 they competed in the Manitoba-Saskatchewan League. This team was inducted into the Manitoba Baseball Hall of Fame in 2001.

On 1 January 2015, Bowsman lost its status as a village upon its amalgamation with the Rural Municipality of Minitonas.

=== Biffy Burning ===
Bowsman completed their first municipal sewer lines and sewage treatment plant in October 1966. The project connected the majority of homes in town to the town sewer lines. For many people, this was the day that their outdoor pit toilet or "biffy" was replaced by an indoor flush toilet. Trucks hauled the discarded wooden biffies to make a large pile near the new sewage plant.

On New Year's Eve, 31 December 1966, residents gathered to celebrate the beginning of Canada's Centennial year and the arrival of community sewer service by burning the pile of their old outhouses.

A monument to commemorate the day of the "Biffy Burning" was dedicated on Canada Day, 1970. In 1971, postal codes in Manitoba were introduced; Bowsman's postal code was changed to R0L 0H0 which is said to stand for "Roll Our Loyal Out Houses Over" in honour of this event.

== Demographics ==
In the 2021 Census of Population conducted by Statistics Canada, Bowsman had a population of 237 living in 105 of its 127 total private dwellings, a change of 9.5% from its 2016 population of 262. With a land area of 2.74 km^{2} (1.06 sq mi), it had a population density of 86.5/km^{2} (224.0/sq mi) in 2021.
