= Ethelbert, Manitoba =

Unincorporated community in Manitoba, Canada

Coordinates: 51.5268°N 100.3927°W

Location of Ethelbert in Manitoba

Ethelbert is an unincorporated urban community in the Municipality of Ethelbert, Manitoba, Canada.

Originally incorporated as a village in 1950, the community was re-classified as an unincorporated urban community on 1 January 2015, following the municipal amalgamations in Manitoba.

Located near Duck Mountain Provincial Park on PTH 10, the community is 370 km (230 mi) northwest of Winnipeg and 60 km (37 mi) north of Dauphin, Manitoba. The primary industries of Ethelbert are agriculture, logging and tourism.

== Demographics ==
In the 2021 Census of Population conducted by Statistics Canada, Ethelbert had a population of 314 living in 149 of its 175 total private dwellings, a change of 13.4% from its 2016, population of 277. With a land area of 2.66 km^{2} (1.03 sq mi), it had a population density of 118.0/km^{2} (305.7/sq mi) in 2021.

== Attractions ==
The Ethelbert and District Museum is open in the summer. The museum features a rich collection of many local artifacts as well as a gift shop.

Ethelbert is surrounded by hundreds of lakes which provide opportunities for fishing, swimming, and water sports like boating and kayaking. Nearby lakes include:

- Jackfish Lake
- Spray Lake
- Lake Winnipeg

== Climate ==
Precipitation data from Environment Canada.

Climate data for Ethelbert
Month	Jan	Feb	Mar	Apr	May	Jun	Jul	Aug	Sep	Oct	Nov	Dec	Year
Average precipitation mm (inches)	19.4 (0.76)	10.3 (0.41)	23.0 (0.91)	23.6 (0.93)	52.0 (2.05)	87.3 (3.44)	76.4 (3.01)	74.2 (2.92)	58.6 (2.31)	27.8 (1.09)	22.1 (0.87)	19.2 (0.76)	493.8 (19.44)
Average rainfall mm (inches)	0.0 (0.0)	0.6 (0.02)	4.2 (0.17)	11.9 (0.47)	50.2 (1.98)	87.3 (3.44)	76.4 (3.01)	74.2 (2.92)	58.6 (2.31)	20.6 (0.81)	2.0 (0.08)	0.2 (0.01)	386.0 (15.20)
Average snowfall cm (inches)	19.4 (7.6)	9.6 (3.8)	18.7 (7.4)	11.8 (4.6)	1.8 (0.7)	0.0 (0.0)	0.0 (0.0)	0.0 (0.0)	0.0 (0.0)	7.3 (2.9)	20.1 (7.9)	19.0 (7.5)	107.7 (42.4)
Source: Environment Canada

The climate in the summer is warm and humid with temperatures reaching 10 °C (50 °F) to 24 °C (75 °F). It usually rains for 6–8 days a month during the summer.

Climate in the winter is a whole different story with the temperature reaching −8 °C (18 °F) to −26 °C (−15 °F). It rains about 5–6 days a month during the winter.
