= Swan River, Manitoba =

Town in Manitoba, Canada

Swan River
- Town
- Town of Swan River

- Town boundaries

- Location in Manitoba
- Coordinates: 52°06′21″N 101°16′00″W
- Country: Canada
- Province: Manitoba
- Region: Parkland
- Incorporated: 1908

Government
  - Mayor: Lance Jacobson
  - MLA (Swan River): Rick Wowchuk (PC)
  - MP (Dauphin—Swan River—Neepawa): Dan Mazier (CPC)

Area
  - Total: 7.16 km^{2} (2.76 sq mi)
  - Population Centre: 6.81 km^{2} (2.63 sq mi)

Population (2021)
  - Total: 4,049
  - Density: 595/km^{2} (1,540/sq mi)
  - Population Centre: 3,989
  - Population Centre density: 633.7/km^{2} (1,641/sq mi)
- Website: swanrivermanitoba.ca

Swan River is a town in Manitoba, Canada. It is surrounded by the Municipality of Swan Valley West in the Swan River Valley region. According to the 2021 Canadian Census, Swan River had a population of 4,049, making it Manitoba's 18th largest in population.

== History ==
Located in a valley between the Duck Mountains and the Porcupine Hills, the town of Swan River is close to the Saskatchewan boundary in west-central Manitoba.

The town is situated along the Swan River which flows into Swan Lake, 55 km (34 mi) to the north-east. Swan Lake is believed to be named for trumpeter swans that once bred near the lake, but are now locally extirpated. Henry Kelsey became the first European explorer to visit the area in 1690. The name of the lake is first noted on a map created by Peter Fidler in 1795 and again on a French map in 1802 (as L du Cigne). The first permanent European settlement dates back to 1770, when fur traders from both the Hudson's Bay Company and the North West Company established outposts along the Swan River where they bought and sold goods to local Cree peoples by way of birch bark canoes.

In 1876, the musical band of the North-West Mounted Police, the forerunner of the Royal Canadian Mounted Police, made its debut in what was later to become Swan River. The instruments used in the band were purchased by the 20 officers in the band and shipped from Winnipeg by dog sled.

The first pioneers arrived in the Swan Valley through the Duck Mountains in 1897 and quickly developed the farming potential of the area. The proposed construction of a line of the Canadian Northern Railway was announced in 1898 and the town was founded in 1900, though it was little more than a post office at the time. Swan River was officially incorporated as a town in 1908.

== Demographics ==
Historical population
Year	Pop.	±%
1911	574	—
1921	903	+57.3%
1931	968	+7.2%
1941	1,129	+16.6%
1951	2,290	+102.8%
1961	3,163	+38.1%
1971	3,522	+11.3%
1981	3,782	+7.4%
1986	3,946	+4.3%
1996	3,986	+1.0%
2001	4,032	+1.2%
2006	3,869	−4.0%
2011	3,907	+1.0%
2016	4,014	+2.7%
2021	4,049	+0.9%

In the 2021 Census of Population conducted by Statistics Canada, Swan River had a population of 4,049 living in 1,825 of its 2,020 total private dwellings, a change of 0.9% from its 2016 population of 4,014. With a land area of 6.81 km^{2} (2.63 sq mi), it had a population density of 594.6/km^{2} (1,539.9/sq mi) in 2021.

== Geology ==
The Swan River Valley is not truly a river valley, but is instead a western extension of the Manitoba lowlands into the Manitoba Escarpment. The Valley is surrounded by escarpment features on three sides: the Duck Mountains to the south; the Porcupine Hills to the north; and Thunder Hill to the west. To the east is Lake Winnipegosis, which is a modern remnant of glacial Lake Agassiz, a lake that filled the valley after the last ice age (the valley was then a bay on the western shore of the lake).

Valley soils are formed from a mixture of glacial till and lacustrine clay. Sandy beach ridges (marking the western shore of Lake Agassiz at various times) lie throughout the area: a prominent beach ridge lies under the town's golf course, just west of town. Valley soils are typically very fertile and deep, and are the area's greatest natural resource. But they also have a high calcium carbonate content and an alkaline pH, which limits their productivity in some crops (for example, blueberries).

The underlying bedrock is composed of Cretaceous shales, and, below that, sandstone, which overlie deeper deposits of Devonian limestone, which in turn overlie Precambrian granite.

== Ecology ==
The Swan River Valley is near the southern limit of the boreal forest in its transition zone to aspen parkland. Valley trees include white spruce, black spruce, tamarack larch, balsam fir, jack pine, quaking aspen, balsam poplar, and paper birch. Most of the forest has been cleared from the flat valley bottom for agricultural purposes, but the surrounding hills are still heavily forested, and are designated as forest reserves.

Numerous peaty bogs and wetlands are present in the area, including hundreds of oxbow lakes of the meandering Swan and Woody rivers. The surrounding hills have many lakes, as does the lower lake bottom land near the eastern edge of the valley.

== Climate ==
The climate of west-central Manitoba features extreme seasonal variation, with winter temperatures below −30 °C (−22 °F) and summer temperatures above 30 °C (86 °F) not uncommon. The town therefore has very distinct seasons. Snow usually covers the ground from early November to early April, and only two Christmases have been recorded that have not been "white" (snow-covered) since such records have been kept. The transition from winter to spring to summer is rapid, with the snow of late March turning to the full green of summer by mid-May. The onset of autumn, then winter, is equally rapid, as daytime high temperatures above 20 °C (68 °F) are common in late September, while temperatures above freezing are rare by early November, only seven weeks later. Summer, although short, is pleasant and very green, owing to the fertility of local soils and adequate rainfall.

Most precipitation falls as rain in the summer - usually in brief thunderstorms - or in less violent but more protracted snow or rainshowers in spring and fall. Little precipitation falls in winter because the air is then too cold to hold significant amounts of moisture. However, because the temperature rarely goes above the melting point of water in winter, what precipitation that does fall falls as snow, and accumulates on the ground, building to a depth of about 45 cm (18 in) before finally starting to melt in March.

Climate data for Swan River, 52°03′N 101°13′W, 346.6 m (1,137 ft)
Month	Jan	Feb	Mar	Apr	May	Jun	Jul	Aug	Sep	Oct	Nov	Dec	Year
Record high °C (°F)	8.5 (47.3)	12.0 (53.6)	20.6 (69.1)	32.2 (90.0)	39.0 (102.2)	38.9 (102.0)	37.8 (100.0)	38.3 (100.9)	37.8 (100.0)	30.6 (87.1)	20.0 (68.0)	11.1 (52.0)	39.0 (102.2)
Mean daily maximum °C (°F)	−12.2 (10.0)	−7.8 (18.0)	−0.7 (30.7)	9.1 (48.4)	17.0 (62.6)	21.9 (71.4)	24.3 (75.7)	23.7 (74.7)	17.5 (63.5)	9.5 (49.1)	−2.2 (28.0)	−9.9 (14.2)	7.5 (45.5)
Daily mean °C (°F)	−17.2 (1.0)	−13.0 (8.6)	−6.2 (20.8)	3.1 (37.6)	10.3 (50.5)	15.5 (59.9)	18.1 (64.6)	17.1 (62.8)	11.3 (52.3)	4.2 (39.6)	−6.3 (20.7)	−14.6 (5.7)	1.8 (35.2)
Mean daily minimum °C (°F)	−22.2 (−8.0)	−18.1 (−0.6)	−11.8 (10.8)	−3.0 (26.6)	3.6 (38.5)	9.0 (48.2)	11.7 (53.1)	10.3 (50.5)	5.2 (41.4)	−1.2 (29.8)	−10.5 (13.1)	−19.2 (−2.6)	−3.9 (25.0)
Record low °C (°F)	−46.1 (−51.0)	−43.9 (−47.0)	−38.0 (−36.4)	−28.3 (−18.9)	−15.6 (3.9)	−5.0 (23.0)	−0.5 (31.1)	−4.4 (24.1)	−12.2 (10.0)	−20.6 (−5.1)	−36.0 (−32.8)	−45.6 (−50.1)	−46.1 (−51.0)
Average precipitation mm (inches)	22.4 (0.88)	16.4 (0.65)	24.5 (0.96)	34.7 (1.37)	54.1 (2.13)	85.4 (3.36)	95.6 (3.76)	76.8 (3.02)	53.4 (2.10)	33.7 (1.33)	25.1 (0.99)	24.4 (0.96)	546.6 (21.52)
Average rainfall mm (inches)	0.2 (0.01)	0.5 (0.02)	6.9 (0.27)	18.7 (0.74)	50.7 (2.00)	85.4 (3.36)	95.6 (3.76)	76.8 (3.02)	52.8 (2.08)	26.5 (1.04)	3.1 (0.12)	0.7 (0.03)	417.8 (16.45)
Average snowfall cm (inches)	22.2 (8.7)	16 (6.3)	17.6 (6.9)	16.1 (6.3)	3.4 (1.3)	0 (0)	0 (0)	0 (0)	0.6 (0.2)	7.2 (2.8)	22 (8.7)	23.8 (9.4)	128.8 (50.7)
Average precipitation days (≥ 0.2 mm)	9.3	6.9	7.4	8.7	11.7	15.1	14.6	12.8	11.7	9.9	7.6	8.4	124
Average rainy days (≥ 0.2 mm)	0.13	0.36	2.1	6.1	11.3	15.1	14.6	12.8	11.6	8.6	1.3	0.17	84.1
Average snowy days (≥ 0.2 cm)	9.1	6.6	6	3.4	0.57	0	0	0	0.21	1.8	6.5	8.4	42.4

== Economy ==
The economic base of the town lies in agriculture and forestry along with support industries for same.

Almost fifty percent of the surrounding area is under cultivation, most of which is seeded to cereal grain, oilseeds, and other speciality crops. Wheat, rye, barley, oats, flax, and rapeseed are the primary grain crops, while other commercial crops include potatoes and strawberries. There are also many mixed farms producing cattle, pigs, and farm-raised wild animals.

Softwood lumber trees (primarily white spruce) are cut from the surrounding forests, and milled at Spruce Products Ltd. Also, east of Swan River is located a mill specializing in the production of oriented strand board from aspen and balsam poplar. It is owned by Louisiana-Pacific.

Other major industries of the town are health care, retail services, manufacturing, and tourism.

== Services ==
The town of Swan River acts as a hub for an area of approximately 8,000 people.

=== Health care ===
The primary healthcare centre in the Swan River Valley is the Swan Valley Health Centre, located in downtown Swan River. The 52 acute-care bed facility was opened in 2005 to replace the old Swan River Valley Hospital, which closed in 2001. Between 2001–2005, the Swan River Valley Hospital was located in a temporary structure adjacent to the old hospital. Services at the hospital include in-patient medical/surgical services, out-patient services, mental health services, and occupational therapy. The hospital is also home to the only emergency department in the Swan River Valley.

== Transportation ==
=== Highways ===
The town is served by Manitoba Provincial Highways PTH 10, PTH 10A, PTH 83, and PTH 83A. Until recently, PTH 10 and PTH 83 came directly into Swan River, with the intersection located near the town's southwestern corner. The completion of a new bypass changed the highway to start on the east side of Swan River. PTH 83 continues south to the Canada–US border near Westhope, North Dakota. It then continues south as U.S. Route 83 to the Mexican border near Brownsville, Texas, making it the longest continuously numbered north-south highway in North America, with a combined distance of 3,450 km (2,140 mi).

=== Airport ===
Swan River Airport has no scheduled flights and is used by charter services, emergency flights and private pilots. Up until the mid 2000s, the Swan River Airport had scheduled flights to Dauphin and the Winnipeg James Armstrong Richardson International Airport in Winnipeg.

== Local media ==
- Newspaper
  - Swan Valley Star and Times
- Radio
  - CFGW-FM-1 95.3, (rebroadcast of CFGW-FM Yorkton, SK)
  - CJSB 104.5, adult contemporary, country, local news and information
- Website
  - ValleyBiz "The Valley Online"

== Education ==
=== Public schools ===
Public schools in Swan River are governed by the Swan Valley School Division #35. There are 7 public schools in the Swan Valley, four of which are in the town of Swan River.

- Benito School (Junior Kindergarten to Grade 8, ~93 Students)
- Bowsman School (Junior Kindergarten to Grade 8, ~105 Students)
- École Swan River South School (Kindergarten to Grade 8 French Immersion, Grade 6 to Grade 8 English ~245 Students)
- Heyes School (Grade 3 to Grade 5, ~126 Students)
- Minitonas School ( Kindergarten to Gr 8) ~ 130
- Swan Valley Regional Secondary School (Grade 9 to Grade 12, ~565 Students)
- Taylor School (Kindergarten to Grade 2, ~227 Students)

=== Private schools ===
- Community Bible Fellowship Christian School (Kindergarten to Grade 8)

=== Post secondary ===
Campus Manitoba, Assiniboine Community College, and University College of the North offer a variety of courses and programs in Swan River.

The Northern Lights Institute of Trades & Technology (through the SVRSS) offers training in job-ready skills and trades through the Swan Valley School Division.

== Churches ==
There are a number of churches in the Swan Valley area

- Anglican & Lutherans at St. James
- Community Bible Fellowship
- First Baptist Church
- Living Word Tabernacle
- Pentecostal Tabernacle
- People's Bible Church
- Roman Catholic Church (St. Columba's and Missions)
- St. Andrews United Church
- Seventh Day Adventist Church
- Solid Rock Church
- Swan River Valley Mennonite Church
- Temple Baptist Church
- Ukrainian Orthodox Church of Holy Ascension
- United Church of Canada (Benito/Kenville Pastoral Charge)
- Valley Evangelical Covenant Church

== Sports and recreation ==
- Ice hockey: Swan River is home to the Swan Valley Stampeders, an ice hockey team, who play in the Manitoba Junior Hockey League. They play their games in the Swan River Centennial Arena.
- Recreation facilities: In addition to the Centennial Arena, Swan River has a six sheet curling rink and formerly a junior Olympic-sized outdoor swimming pool, the Swan River Kinsmen Pool. Phase one of the Richardson Recreation and Wellness Centre was completed October 2013, which is the Swan Valley Credit Union Aquatics Centre. Phase Two will possibly include an indoor fieldhouse and community health services. Two parks within the town have walking paths. Additionally, the town maintains several baseball diamonds and soccer fields. Nearby is the Swan River Golf & Country Club which was recently expanded from 9 to 18 holes. Stock car racing can be found at the quarter-mile clay oval Swan Valley Speedway.
- Thunderhill Ski Area, which features some of Manitoba's longest ski runs, is about a twenty-minute drive from Swan River.

== Events ==
Swan River hosts the annual Northwest Round-up and Exhibition on the last weekend of July. The Northwest Round-up and Exhibition, which is hosted by the Agricultural Society, includes a parade, chariot and chuck wagon races, heavy and light horse shows, talent stages, concerts, dances, home living and school work exhibits, a midway, and the rodeo, which features events like the heavy horse pull, barrel racing, calf roping, and bull riding.

== Notable people ==
- Billy Beal, sawmill engineer and one of the first Black settlers in Manitoba
- Barry Brust, NHL player
- Sven Delblanc, writer
- Douglas Durkin, writer
- Micheal Ferland, National Hockey League (NHL) player
- Barney Hartman, skeet shooter
- Gennady Kaskov, ice dancer
- David MacLennan, scientist
- Jeff McDill, hockey player
- John McDonald, NHL player
- Gertrude Richardson, feminist
- Stan Struthers, politician
- Gladys Taylor, publisher
- James Wells Robson, politician

== Citations ==
Geographical Names of Manitoba, National Library of Canada, ISBN 0-7711-1517-2, 2005
