= Manitoba Highway 41 =

Highway in Manitoba

Provincial Trunk Highway 41
- PTH 41 highlighted in red

Route information
- Maintained by Department of Infrastructure
- Length: 69 km (43 mi)
- Existed: 1956–present

Major junctions
- South end: PTH 1 (TCH) / PR 542 at Kirkella
- PTH 42 near St. Lazare
- North end: PTH 16 (TCH) / PTH 83 / PR 359 near Binscarth

Location
- Country: Canada
- Province: Manitoba
- Rural municipalities: Ellice – Archie; Russell – Binscarth; Wallace – Woodworth

Highway system
- Provincial highways in Manitoba; Winnipeg City Routes
| ← PTH 39 | → PTH 42 |

Provincial Trunk Highway 41 (PTH 41) is a short provincial highway in the far southwest region of the Canadian province of Manitoba. It runs from PTH 1 and PR 542 in the village of Kirkella to PTH 16 and PTH 83 just south of Binscarth.

PTH 41 is the main highway through the communities of McAuley and St. Lazare, and follows the Saskatchewan border for most of its length. The majority of the route travels within 10 km (6 mi) of the provincial boundary.

The speed limit is 90 km/h (55 mph).

== Route description ==
PTH 41 begins in the Rural Municipality of Wallace - Woodworth at a junction with PTH 1 (Trans-Canada Highway) in Kirkella, with the road continuing southward as PR 542. It heads due northward to enter the Rural Municipality of Ellice - Archie, traveling through rural farmland for several kilometers to travel past Manson, where it has an intersection with PR 467 and crosses a creek. Continuing north for several more kilometers, the highway goes through a slight switchback before crossing a railroad track and traveling through McAuley, where it junctions with PR 256. PTH 41 leaves McAuley and has intersection with PR 571 (short continuation of Saskatchewan Highway 308 (Hwy 308)) and PR 545 before becoming very curvy and winding as it lowers itself down into the Qu'Appelle River valley. The highway crosses the Assiniboine River, just meters from its merge with the Qu'Appelle, and a railroad to enter the town of St. Lazare. Entering town along Main Street, it makes a sharp left onto Fouillard Avenue at the center of town. PTH 41 now heads eastward to leave St. Lazare and climb back out of the river valley, only to come to a T-intersection with PTH 42 a couple kilometers later, with PTH 41 turning due north again here. PTH 41 traverses rural and mostly flat farmland for the next several kilometers, having an intersection with PR 475 before entering the Rural Municipality of Russell – Binscarth. The highway makes a sharp curve to the east to cross a railroad line and immediately come to an end at an intersection with PTH 16 (Yellowhead Highway) / PTH 83 just south of Binscarth. The road continues east as PR 359.

The entire length of Manitoba Highway 41 is a rural, paved, two-lane highway.

== Major intersections ==
| Division | Location | km | mi | Destinations | Notes |
|---|---|---|---|---|---|
| Wallace – Woodworth | Kirkella | 0 | 0.0 | PTH 1 (TCH) – Brandon, Regina; PR 542 south – Kirkella, Kola | Southern terminus; road continues south as PR 542 |
| Ellice – Archie | Manson | 12 | 7.5 | Road 77N to Highway 600 – Manson, Moosomin | Former PR 467 west |
| Ellice – Archie | | 15 | 9.3 | PR 467 east – Willen, Miniota | |
| Ellice – Archie | | 20 | 12 | Road 82N | Former PR 565 west |
| Ellice – Archie | | 23 | 14 | Road 84N to Highway 703 | |
| Ellice – Archie | McAuley | 26 | 16 | PR 256 south – Willen, Elkhorn | |
| Ellice – Archie | | 33 | 21 | PR 571 west to Highway 308 – Welwyn | |
| Ellice – Archie | | 43 | 27 | PR 545 west – Rocanville | PTH 41 turns northeast toward St. Lazare |
| Ellice – Archie | | 46 | 29 | Fort Ellice Road – Fort Ellice | |
| Ellice – Archie | | 47 | 29 | Crosses the Assiniboine River | |
| Ellice – Archie | St. Lazare | 49 | 30 | Main Street / Fouillard Avenue | PTH 41 turns east |
| Ellice – Archie | | 52 | 32 | PTH 42 east – Birtle, Shoal Lake | PTH 41 turns north |
| Ellice – Archie | | 60 | 37 | PR 475 east – Foxwarren | |
| Russell – Binscarth | | 69 | 43 | PTH 16 (TCH) / PTH 83 / YH – Russell, Foxwarren, Binscarth; PR 359 east | Northern terminus; road continues east as PR 359 |
1.000 mi = 1.609 km; 1.000 km = 0.621 mi

== Related routes ==
=== Provincial Road 475 ===
Provincial Road 475
- Road 103N
- Location: Foxwarren
- Length: 8.8 km (5.5 mi)
- Existed: 1966–present

Provincial Road 475 (PR 475) is a 8.8-kilometre-long (5.5 mi) east–west spur of PTH 41 in the Rural Municipalities of Ellice-Archie and Prairie View, providing access to both the town of Foxwarren and the Yellowhead Highway. It is entirely a paved two-lane highway and includes a railway crossing just outside of Foxwarren.

| Division | Location | km | mi | Destinations | Notes |
|---|---|---|---|---|---|
| Ellice-Archie | | 0.0 | 0.0 | PTH 41 – St. Lazare, Binscarth | Western terminus; road continues west as Road 103N |
| Ellice-Archie | | 3.3 | 2.1 | Road 163W | Former PR 568 south |
| Prairie View | Foxwarren | 8.8 | 5.5 | PTH 16 (TCH) / PTH 83 / YH – Binscarth, Shoal Lake | Eastern terminus; road continues north as Road 160W |
1.000 mi = 1.609 km; 1.000 km = 0.621 mi

=== Provincial Road 545 ===
Provincial Road 545
- Location: Rural Municipality of Ellice-Archie
- Length: 5.5 km (3.4 mi)
- Existed: 1969–present

Provincial Road 545 (PR 545) is a short 5.5-kilometre-long (3.4 mi) east-west spur of PTH 41 in the Rural Municipality of Ellice-Archie, serving as a connection to Rocanville, Saskatchewan and the Rocanville mine via Township Road 172 and Saskatchewan Highway 600. It is an unpaved two-lane gravel road for its entire length, with no other major intersections or settlements along the highway.

| Division | Location | km | mi | Destinations | Notes |
|---|---|---|---|---|---|
| Ellice-Archie | | 0.0 | 0.0 | Township Road 172 to Highway 600 – Rocanville, Rocanville mine | Continuation into Saskatchewan; western terminus |
| Ellice-Archie | | 5.5 | 3.4 | PTH 41 – St. Lazare, McAuley | Eastern terminus |
1.000 mi = 1.609 km; 1.000 km = 0.621 mi

=== Provincial Road 571 ===
Provincial Road 571
- Location: Rural Municipality of Ellice-Archie
- Length: 6.4 km (4.0 mi)
- Existed: 1966–present

Provincial Road 571 (PR 571) is a short 6.4-kilometre-long (4.0 mi) east-west spur of PTH 41 in the Rural Municipality of Ellice-Archie, serving as a connection to the hamlet of Welwyn, Saskatchewan and continuing into the neighboring province as Saskatchewan Highway 308. It is entirely a paved two-lane road, with no other settlements or major intersections along its entire length.

| Division | Location | km | mi | Destinations | Notes |
|---|---|---|---|---|---|
| Ellice-Archie | | 0.0 | 0.0 | Highway 308 west – Welwyn | Continuation into Saskatchewan; western terminus |
| Ellice-Archie | | 6.4 | 4.0 | PTH 41 – St. Lazare, McAuley | Eastern terminus |
1.000 mi = 1.609 km; 1.000 km = 0.621 mi
