= The World-Spectator =

Weekly newspaper in Saskatchewan, Canada

- Front page of the May 25, 2020 edition
- Type: Weekly
- Owner: Kevin Weedmark
- Publisher: Kevin Weedmark
- City: Moosomin, Saskatchewan
- Country: Canada
- Circulation: 4,001
- Website: www.world-spectator.com

The World-Spectator is a weekly newspaper in the Canadian province of Saskatchewan, serving the communities of Moosomin, Rocanville, Esterhazy, Redvers, Wapella, Wawota, Langbank, Welwyn, Spy Hill, Tantallon, Fleming, Fairlight and Maryfield. It also serves the Manitoba communities of St. Lazare, McAuley, Manson, Elkhorn, and Kola.

The newspaper's history dates back to October 2, 1884, when the first issue was published. The newspaper published daily editions for a short time during the North-West Rebellion in 1885.

== See also ==
- List of newspapers in Canada
