= Manitoba Provincial Road 467 =

Provincial road in Manitoba, Canada

Provincial Road 467

Route information
- Maintained by Department of Infrastructure
- Length: 29.5 km (18.3 mi)
- Existed: 1966–present

Major junctions
- West end: PTH 41 near Manson
- PR 256 in Willen
- East end: PTH 83 near Miniota

Location
- Country: Canada
- Province: Manitoba
- Rural municipalities: Ellice-Archie, Prairie View

Highway system
- Provincial highways in Manitoba; Winnipeg City Routes
← PR 466	→ PR 468

Provincial Road 467 (PR 467) is a 29.5-kilometre-long (18.3 mi) east–west highway in the Westman Region of Manitoba. It connects the towns of Manson, McAuley and Miniota via Willen.

== Route description ==
PR 467 begins in the Rural Municipality of Ellice-Archie at an intersection with PTH 41 just north of Manson, heading due east through rural farmland for several kilometres. It passes through the small hamlet of Willen, where it shares a short concurrency with PR 256 and crosses a railway, before entering the Prairie View Municipality. The highway goes through some switchbacks as it crosses a small creek and travels just to the north of Reeder, connected via Road 161W, before lowering itself down into the Assiniboine River valley, following the banks of the river southward to come to an end at an intersection with PTH 83 just south of the town of Miniota. The entire length of PR 467 is a gravel, two-lane highway.

== History ==
Prior to 1992, PR 467 extended south along PTH 41 to Manson before continuing west along Road 77N, continuing across the border into Saskatchewan as Township Road 135, coming to an end a short distance later at an intersection with Saskatchewan Highway 600 (Hwy 600) just west of Moosomin. The original length of PR 467 was 37.5 kilometres (23.3 mi).

== Major intersections ==
Division	Location	km	mi	Destinations	Notes
Ellice-Archie		0.0	0.0	PTH 41 – Manson, McAuley	Western terminus
Ellice-Archie		9.9	6.2	PR 256 south – Elkhorn	Western end of PR 256 concurrency
Ellice-Archie	Willen	11.5	7.1	PR 256 north – McAuley	Eastern end of PR 256 concurrency
Prairie View		18.1	11.2	Road 161W – Reeder	
Prairie View		29.5	18.3	PTH 83 – Miniota, Virden	Eastern terminus
1.000 mi = 1.609 km; 1.000 km = 0.621 mi
