= Rural Municipality of Archie =

Rural municipality in Manitoba, Canada

Coordinates: 50°11′47″N 101°19′27″W

The Rural Municipality of Archie is a former rural municipality (RM) in the Canadian province of Manitoba. It was originally incorporated as a rural municipality on December 22, 1883. It ceased on January 1, 2015 as a result of its provincially mandated amalgamation with the RM of Ellice and the Village of St. Lazare to form the Rural Municipality of Ellice – Archie.

Archie was named in 1883 after Archie McDonald, a chief factor with the Hudson's Bay Company at Fort Ellice. Its economic base was primarily agriculture and the geography included the Assiniboine River and related valleys. It was about 345 square kilometres and the largest centre was McAuley.

It bordered a small part of the Birdtail Sioux First Nation in its northeast section.

== Communities ==
- Manson
- McAuley
- Willen

== Reeves ==
Name	In Office
Samuel Leslie	1884–1887
John Traquair	1888–1889
R. J. Anderson	1890–1894
Charles Poole	1895–1910
William Macdonald	1911–1916
Robert J. Hewitt	1917–1922; 1927; 1929–1937
J. E. Jamieson	1923–1926
William Pateman	1938–1957
C. Donald McAree	1958–1967
E. Arthur Poole	1968–1971
Stuart A. Grant	1972–1975
Ronald J. McAuley	1976–1977
Aime J. Hudon	1978–1988
Robert B. Peters	1989
C. Terrance Johnson	1990–1992; 1999–2001
Charles U. Lowes	1993–1998; 2002–2004
Brian Bajus	2005-2014?
