= Saskatchewan Highway 308 =

Provincial highway in Saskatchewan, Canada

Highway 308

Route information
- Maintained by Ministry of Highways and Infrastructure
- Length: 14.8 km (9.2 mi)

Major junctions
- West end: Highway 8 near Rocanville
- Highway 600 in Welwyn
- East end: Manitoba border (PR 571) near Welwyn

Location
- Country: Canada
- Province: Saskatchewan
- Rural municipalities: Rocanville, Moosomin

Highway system
- Provincial highways in Saskatchewan
← Highway 307	→ Highway 309

Highway 308 is a provincial highway in the Canadian province of Saskatchewan. It runs from Highway 8 until the Manitoba border, where it transitions into Provincial Road 571. The highway provides access to the town of Welwyn, Welwyn Centennial Regional Park, and intersects Highway 600. It is about 15 kilometres (9.3 mi) long.

== Route description ==
Hwy 308 begins a few kilometres south of the town of Rocanville at an intersection with Hwy 8, with the road continuing west as Township Road 160. It heads east through rural prairie lands for several kilometres to cross a railway and enter the village of Welwyn, where it travels along its north side to have a junction with Hwy 600, which provides access to Welwyn Centennial Regional Park just to the north. Leaving Welwyn, the highway continues east to arrive at the Manitoba border, with the road continuing east as Manitoba Provincial Road 571 (PR 571). The entire length of Hwy 308 is a paved two-lane highway and lies on the boundary between the Rural Municipality of Rocanville No. 151 and Rural Municipality of Moosomin No. 121.

== Major intersections ==
From west to east:

Rural municipality	Location	km	mi	Destinations	Notes
Rocanville No. 151 / Moosomin No. 121 boundary		0.0	0.0	Highway 8 – Moosomin, Rocanville	Western terminus; road continues west as Township Road 160
Rocanville No. 151 / Moosomin No. 121 boundary	Welwyn	11.5	7.1	Highway 600 (Range Road 1302) – Rocanville, Fleming, Welwyn Centennial Regional Park	
Rocanville No. 151 / Moosomin No. 121 boundary	Welwyn	12.3	7.6	Railway Avenue – Welwyn	
Rocanville No. 151 / Moosomin No. 121 boundary		14.8	9.2	PR 571 east to PTH 41 – St. Lazare, McAuley	Continuation into Manitoba, eastern terminus
1.000 mi = 1.609 km; 1.000 km = 0.621 mi

== See also ==
- Transportation in Saskatchewan
- Roads in Saskatchewan
