= Manitoba Provincial Road 542 =

Provincial road in Manitoba, Canada

Provincial Road 542

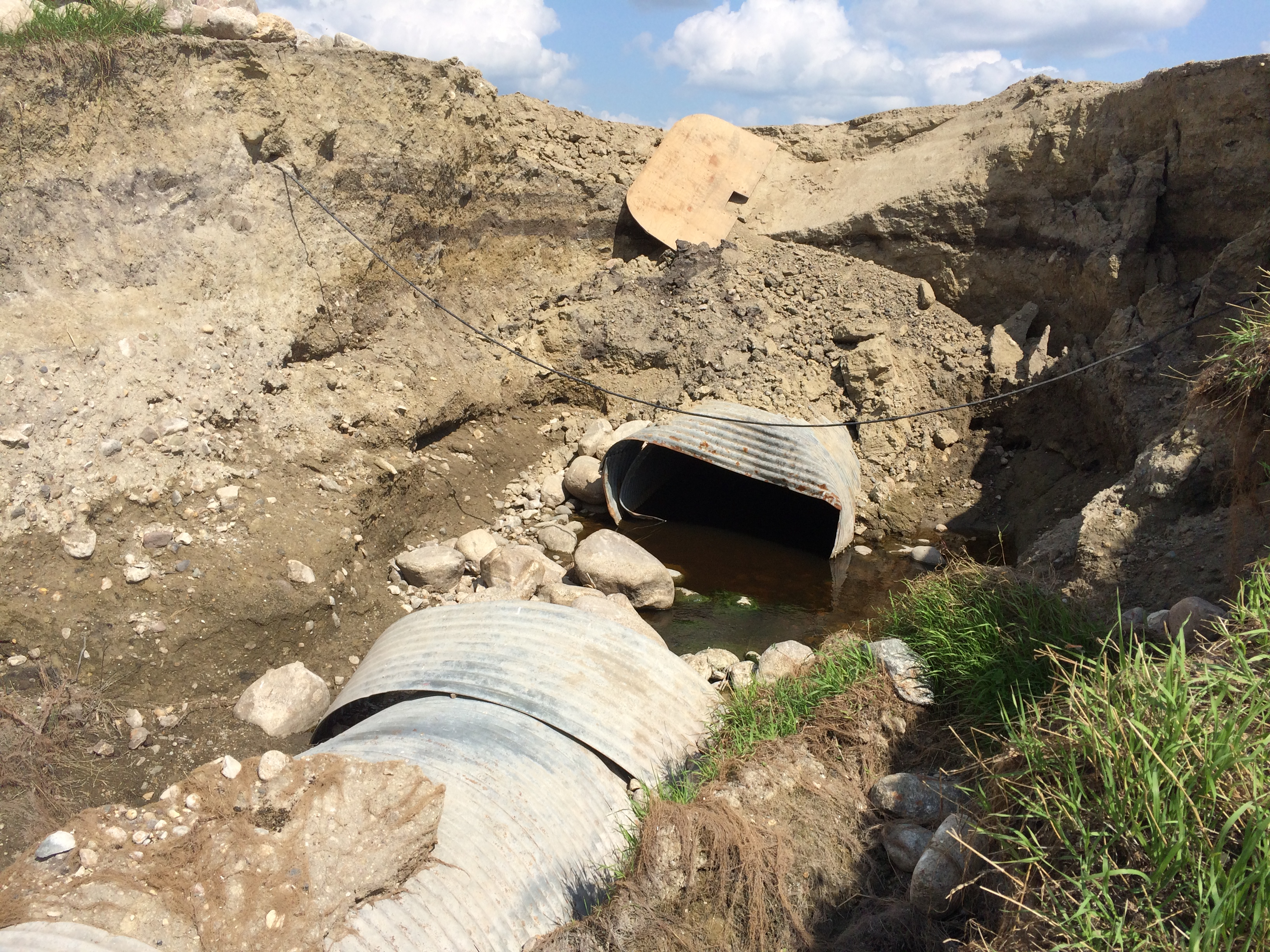
- PR 542 near Kirkella after being washed out by torrential rain in July, 2014

Route information
- Maintained by Department of Infrastructure
- Length: 21 km (13 mi)
- Existed: 1984–present

Major junctions
- South end: PR 257 in Kola
- North end: PTH 1 (TCH) / PTH 41 near Kirkella

Location
- Country: Canada
- Province: Manitoba
- Rural municipalities: Wallace-Woodworth

Highway system
- Provincial highways in Manitoba; Winnipeg City Routes
← PR 541	→ PR 543

Provincial Road 542 (PR 542) is a road in southwestern Manitoba, Canada. At its southern end, it intersects with Manitoba Provincial Road 257 at Kola. It runs due north until the Trans-Canada Highway near Kirkella, where the road becomes Highway 41.

== Major intersections ==
Division	Location	km	mi	Destinations	Notes
Wallace-Woodworth	Kola	0.0	0.0	PR 257 – Virden, Maryfield	Southern terminus
Wallace-Woodworth		20.4	12.7	Front Street – Kirkella	
Wallace-Woodworth		21.3	13.2	PTH 1 (TCH) – Moosomin, Elkhorn; PTH 41 north – McAuley	Northern terminus; southern terminus of PTH 41; road continues north as PTH 41 northbound
1.000 mi = 1.609 km; 1.000 km = 0.621 mi
