= Manitoba Provincial Road 257 =

Provincial road in Manitoba, Canada

Provincial Road 257
- PR 257 highlighted in red

Route information
- Maintained by Department of Infrastructure
- Length: 37.3 km (23.2 mi)
- Existed: 1966–present

Major junctions
- West end: Highway 48 at Manitoba – Saskatchewan border near Kola
- PR 542 in Kola; PR 256 near Cromer; PTH 83 in Virden
- East end: PTH 1 (TCH) near Virden

Location
- Country: Canada
- Province: Manitoba
- Rural municipalities: Wallace – Woodworth
- Towns: Virden

Highway system
- Provincial highways in Manitoba; Winnipeg City Routes
← PR 256	→ PR 259

Provincial Road 257 (PR 257) is a provincial road located in the Westman Region of Manitoba, Canada.

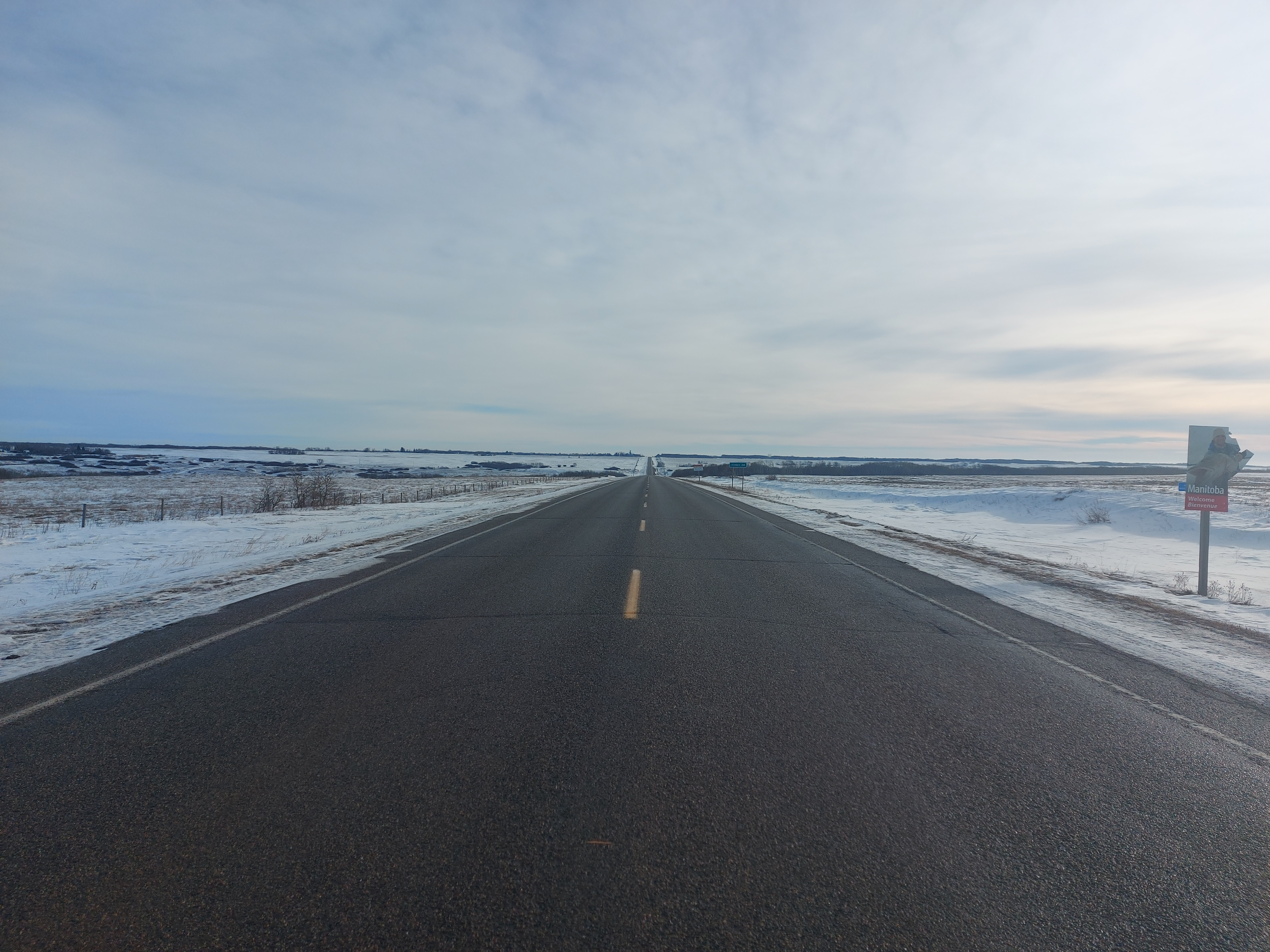
Provincial Road 257 at its western terminus

PR 257 starts at the Trans-Canada Highway just east of Virden and terminates at the Saskatchewan - Manitoba border between Kola and Maryfield, where it continues as Highway 48. The highway is known as Government Road South within Virden's town limits.

The length of PR 257 is about 37 kilometres (23 mi), and is paved for its entire length. The speed limit is 90 km/h (56 mph).

== Major intersections ==
Division	Location	km	mi	Destinations	Notes
Wallace – Woodworth		0.0	0.0	Highway 48 west – Maryfield, Fairlight	Continuation into Saskatchewan
Wallace – Woodworth	Kola	3.3	2.1	PR 542 north – Kirkella	Southern terminus of PR 542
Wallace – Woodworth		13.1	8.1	PR 256 – Elkhorn, Cromer	
Wallace – Woodworth		24.5	15.2	Road 159 W	Former PR 252
Town of Virden		32.7	20.3	PTH 83 to PTH 1 (TCH) – Birtle, Melita	
Wallace – Woodworth		37.3	23.2	PTH 1 (TCH) – Regina, Brandon	Eastern terminus
1.000 mi = 1.609 km; 1.000 km = 0.621 mi: Route transition
