= List of municipalities in Manitoba =

Location of Manitoba in Canada

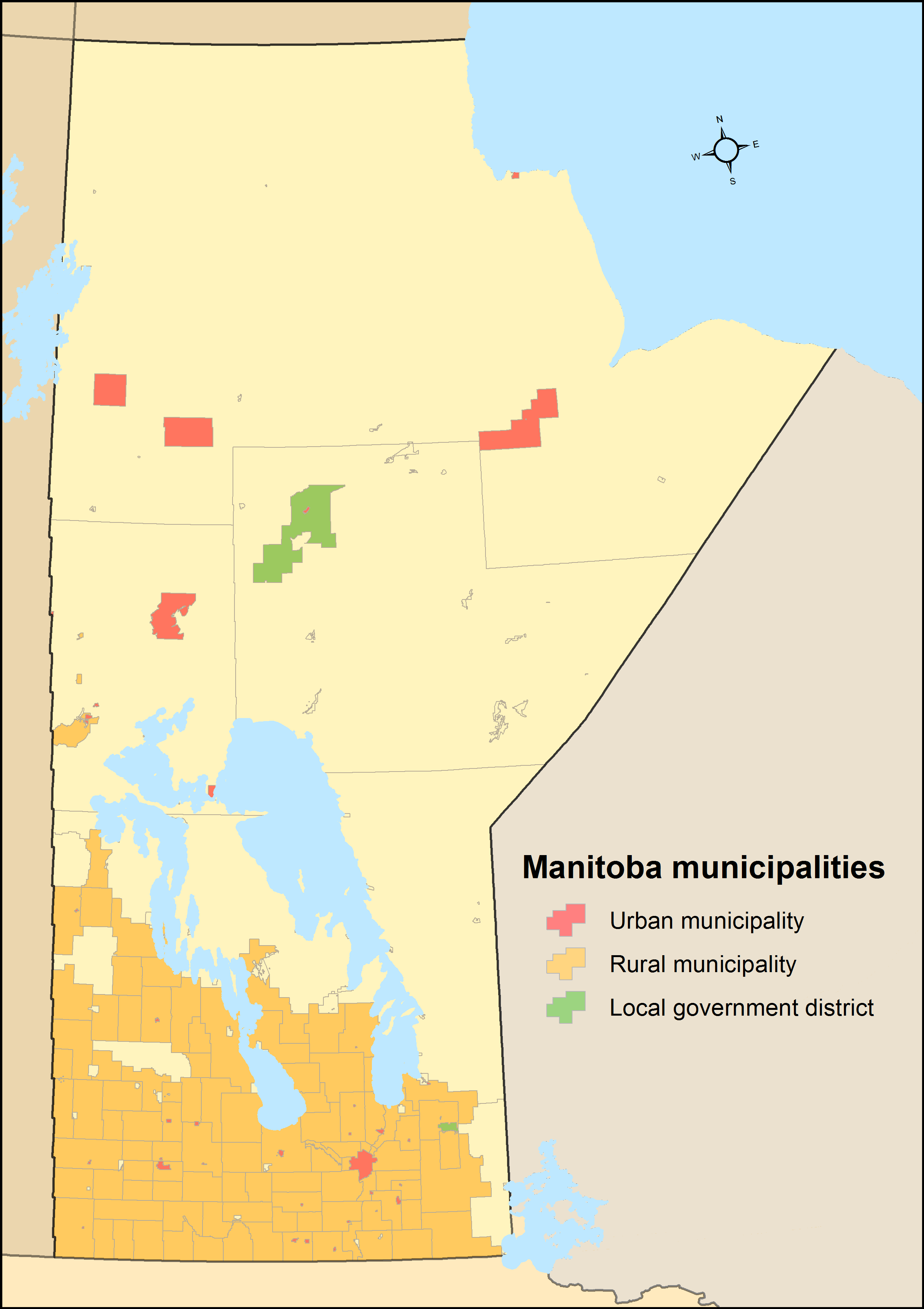
Distribution of Manitoba's 137 municipalities by type following the 2015 municipal amalgamations

Manitoba is the fifth most populous province in Canada with 1,342,153 residents as of 2021 and is the sixth largest in land area at 540,310 km^{2} (208,610 mi^{2}). Manitoba's 137 municipalities cover only 21% of the province's land mass yet are home to 95% of its population. These municipalities provide local government services to their residents. The remaining land consists of unincorporated areas, mainly in central and northern Manitoba, as well as Indian reserves and Indian settlements.

A municipality in Manitoba is "a municipality that is continued or formed under" the Municipal Act, which was enacted in 1996. Municipalities that can be formed under this legislation include urban municipalities (cities, towns and villages) and rural municipalities. The Local Government Districts Act, enacted in 1987, allows the formation of local government districts as another municipality type. Of Manitoba's 137 municipalities, 37 of them are urban municipalities (10 cities, 25 towns and 2 villages), 98 are rural municipalities and 2 are local government districts. The Municipal Act and the Local Government Districts Act stipulate governance of these municipalities. Additional charters or acts are in place specifically for the cities of Brandon, Flin Flon, Portage la Prairie, Thompson and Winnipeg, the towns of Morris and Winnipeg Beach, and the rural municipalities of Kelsey, St. Andrews and Victoria Beach. The Municipal Act, the Local Government Districts Act, and all these additional acts and charters were enacted at the provincial level by the Lieutenant Governor of Manitoba on the advice and consent of the Legislative Assembly of Manitoba. The Government of Manitoba's Department of Municipal Relations responsible for providing provincial services to municipalities.

Over half of Manitoba's population resides in the City of Winnipeg, the provincial capital, with a population with 749,607. The City of Brandon is the province's second most populous municipality with 51,313 residents. Manitoba's smallest municipality by population is the Local Government District of Mystery Lake with 0 residents. The largest municipality by land area is the Rural Municipality (RM) of Reynolds at 3,559.65 km^{2} (1,374.39 mi^{2}), while the smallest by land area is the Village of Arborg at 2.22 km^{2} (0.86 mi^{2}).

Manitoba's first municipality was the RM of Springfield (originally Springfield-Sunnyside). It was incorporated on September 27, 1873. Winnipeg was incorporated as a city a few weeks later on November 8, 1873.

== Urban municipalities ==
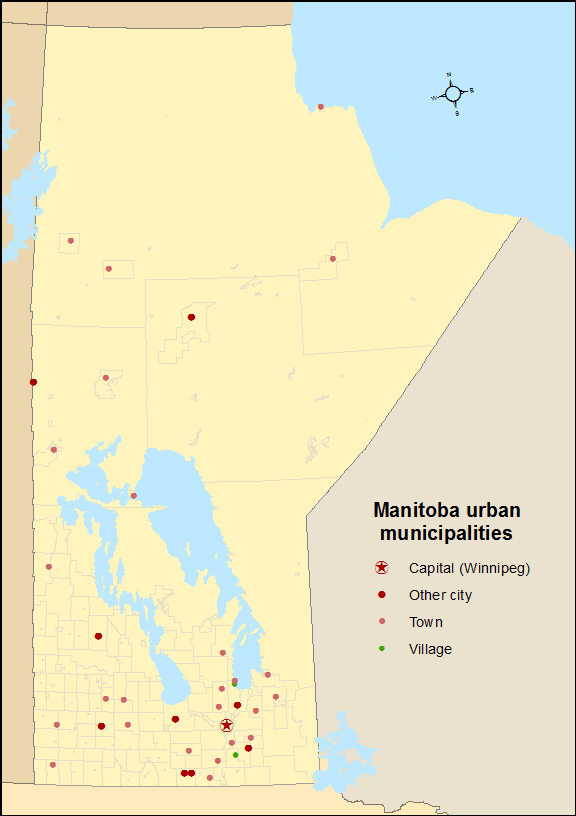
Distribution of Manitoba's 37 urban municipalities by type (2015)

Manitoba's Municipal Act, enacted in 1996, defines an urban municipality as an incorporated "area with at least 1,000 residents and a population density of at least 400 residents per square kilometre." An urban municipality, upon formation, may be named a "city", "town", "village" or "urban municipality", although there is a minimum 7,500 population requirement that limits the naming of cities.

Combined, Manitoba has 37 urban municipalities comprising 10 cities, 25 towns and 2 villages. The 37 urban municipalities have a total population of 955,774, a total land area of 6,264.53 km^{2} (2,418.75 mi^{2}). These totals represent 71.2% of Manitoba's population but only 1.2% of its land area.

Of Manitoba's 37 urban municipalities, 6 have populations less than the current minimum population requirement of 1,000 and 20 have less than the current minimum density requirement of 400 residents per square kilometre. All of these were incorporated as urban municipalities prior to the Municipal Act being enacted in 1996.

=== Cities ===
In Manitoba, a city is a type of urban municipality. The Municipal Act stipulates that an urban municipality can only be named a city if it has a minimum population of 7,500 residents.

Manitoba has 10 cities that had a cumulative population of 892,517 in the 2021 census. These 10 cities include Flin Flon, of which a small portion is located within the neighbouring province of Saskatchewan. The province's largest and smallest cities by population are Winnipeg and the Manitoba portion of Flin Flon with populations of 749,607 and 4,940 respectively. The province's largest and smallest cities by land area are Winnipeg and Dauphin with land areas of 461.78 km^{2} (178.29 mi^{2}) and 12.67 km^{2} (4.89 mi^{2}) respectively. Manitoba's newest city is Morden, which changed from a town to a city on August 24, 2012.

=== Towns ===
In Manitoba, an urban municipality may be named a town upon formation. Other than the requirements to incorporate as an urban municipality (1,000 residents and 400 people/km^{2}), the Municipal Act has no minimum population threshold to limit the naming of them as towns. A town can alternately be named a village or urban municipality under the Municipal Act or a city if it has a minimum population of 7,500.

Manitoba has 25 towns that had a cumulative population of 60,963 in the 2021 census. The province's largest and smallest towns by population are Niverville and Grand Rapids with populations of 5,947 and 213 respectively. The province's largest and smallest towns by land area are Gillam and Arborg with land areas of 1,994.44 km^{2} (770.06 mi^{2}) and 2.22 km^{2} (0.86 mi^{2}) respectively.

=== Villages ===
In Manitoba, an urban municipality may be named a village upon formation. Other than the minimum requirements to incorporate as an urban municipality (1,000 residents and 400 people/km^{2}), the Municipal Act has no minimum population threshold to limit the naming of them as villages. A village can alternately be named a town or urban municipality under the Municipal Act or a city if it has a minimum population of 7,500.

Manitoba has 2 villages that had a cumulative population of 2,294 in the 2021 census. These are St-Pierre-Jolys and Dunnottar with populations of 1,305 and 989 respectively.

=== List of urban municipalities ===
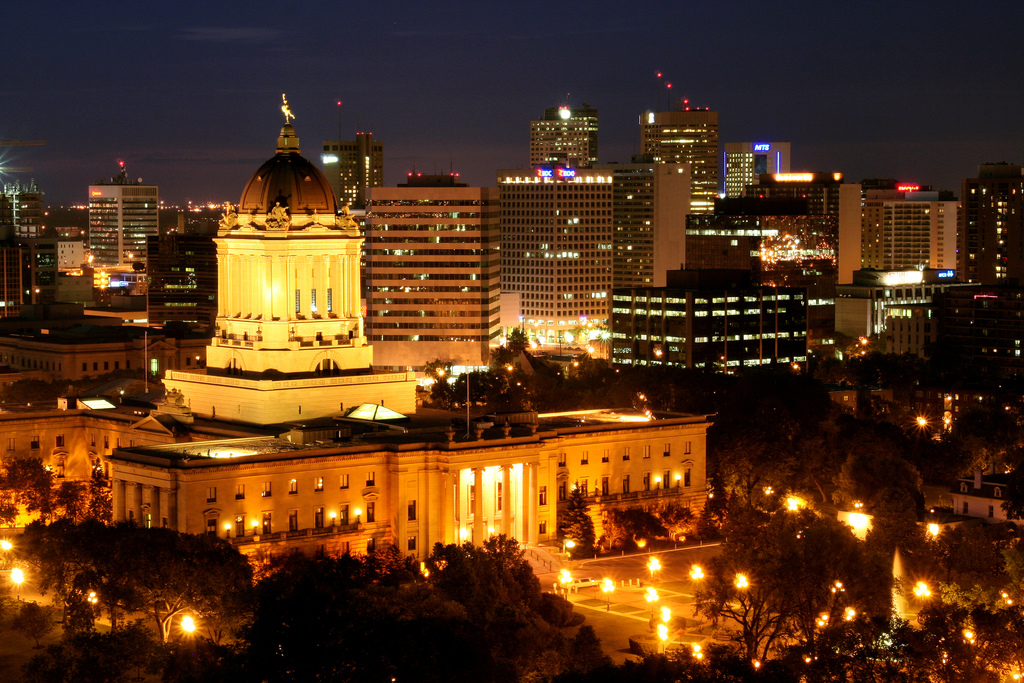
Manitoba Legislature in downtown Winnipeg, Manitoba's capital and largest municipality

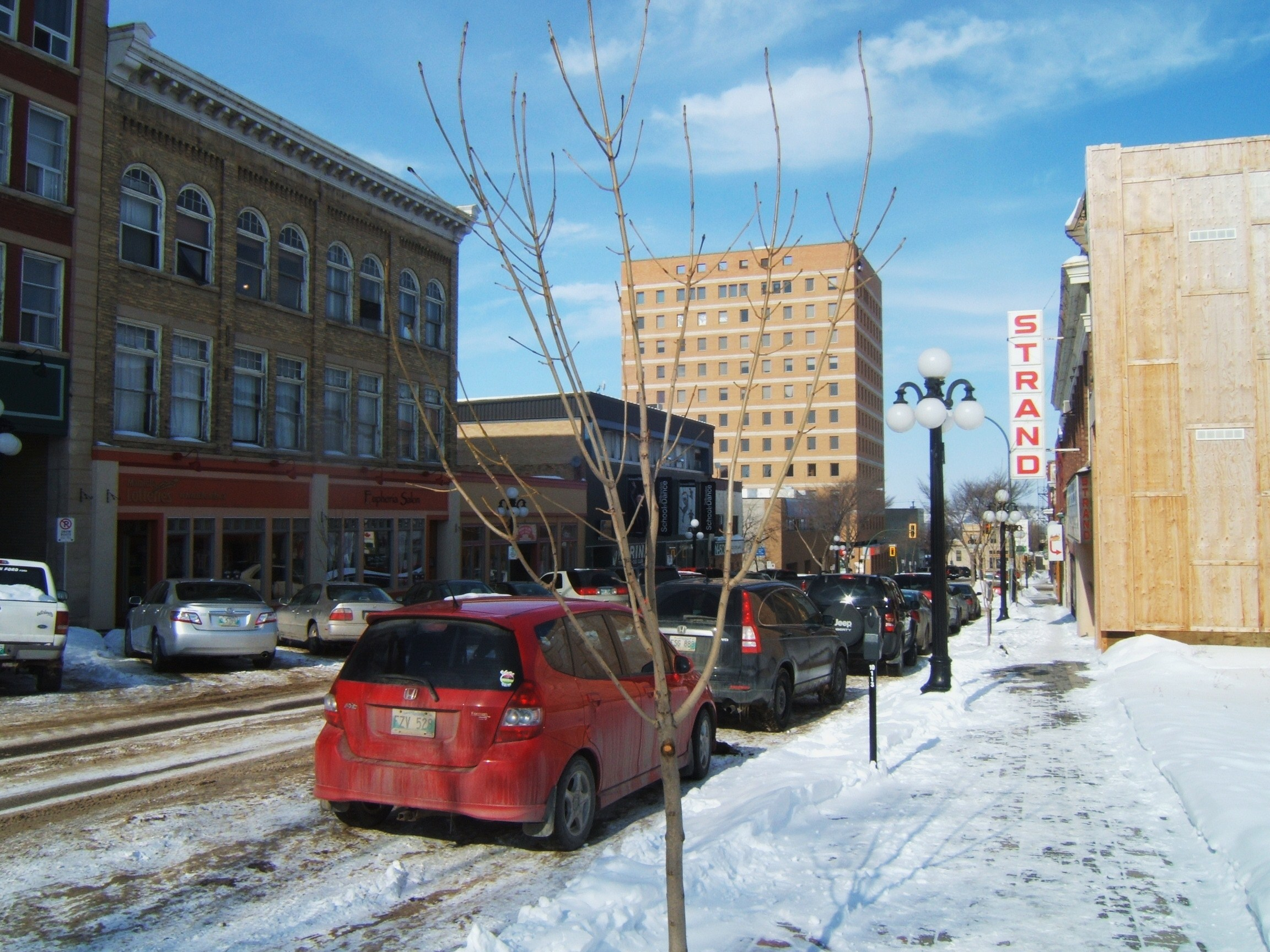
Downtown Brandon, Manitoba's second largest municipality

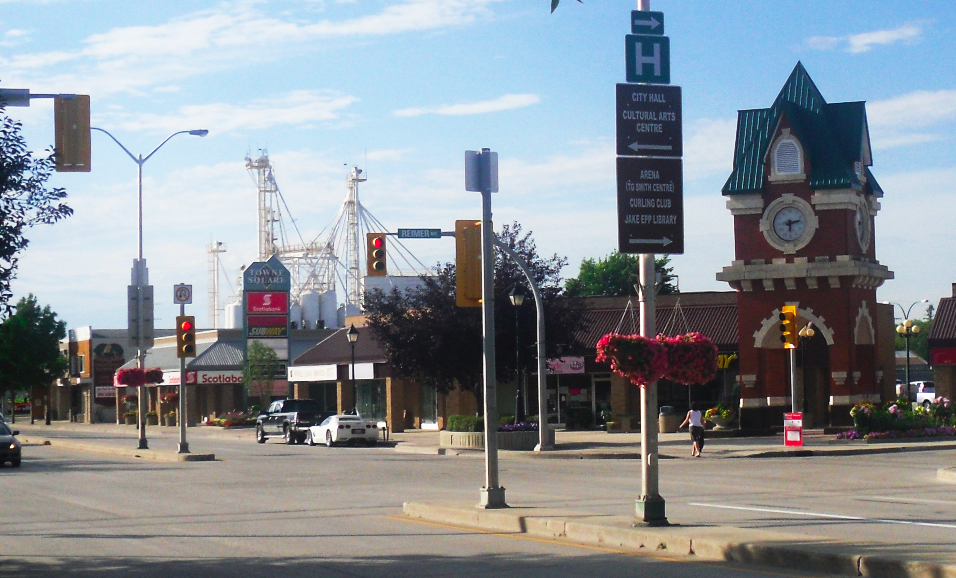
Downtown Steinbach, Manitoba's third largest municipality

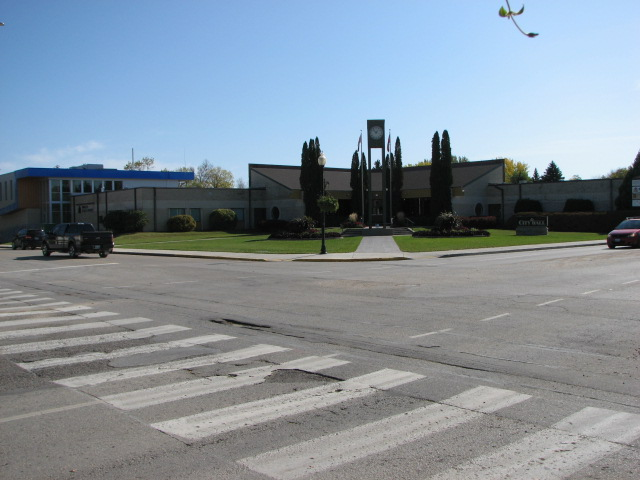
City Hall of Winkler, Manitoba's fourth largest municipality

List of urban municipalities in Manitoba
Name	Municipal status	Incorporation date	2021 Census of Population				
Name	Municipal status	Incorporation date	Population (2021)	Population (2016)	Change	Land area (km^{2})	Population density (/km^{2})
Altona (Note: The towns of Altona, Arborg, Beausejour, Carberry, Carman, Lac du Bonnet, Melita, Niverville, Powerview-Pine Falls, Ste. Anne, Stonewall, Teulon, Virden and Winnipeg Beach were originally incorporated as villages.)	Town	December 31, 1945	4,267	4,212	+1.3%	9.35	456.4
Arborg	Town	January 1, 1964	1,279	1,232	+3.8%	2.22	576.1
Beausejour	Town	November 5, 1908	3,307	3,219	+2.7%	5.42	610.1
Brandon	City	May 30, 1882	51,313	48,883	+5.0%	79.04	649.2
Carberry	Town	December 20, 1889	1,818	1,738	+4.6%	4.80	378.8
Carman	Town	November 3, 1899	3,114	3,164	−1.6%	4.32	720.8
Churchill (Note: The towns of Churchill, Gillam, Grand Rapids, Leaf Rapids, Lynn Lake and Snow Lake were originally incorporated as local government districts.)	Town	January 1, 1959	870	899	−3.2%	50.83	17.1
Dauphin (Note: The cities of Dauphin, Morden and Winkler were originally incorporated as villages and each also held town status prior to acquiring their current city status.)	City	July 11, 1898	8,368	8,369	0.0%	12.67	660.5
Dunnottar	Village	December 31, 1947	989	763	+29.6%	2.80	353.2
Flin Flon (Note: The City of Flin Flon was originally incorporated as a municipal district and also held town status prior to acquiring its current city status.)	City	August 15, 1933	4,940	4,991	−1.0%	13.14	376.0
Gillam	Town	May 1, 1966	1,007	1,201	−16.2%	1,994.44	0.5
Grand Rapids	Town	March 1, 1962	213	268	−20.5%	74.27	2.9
Lac du Bonnet	Town	December 31, 1947	1,064	1,089	−2.3%	2.26	470.8
Leaf Rapids	Town	December 1, 1971	351	582	−39.7%	1,237.66	0.3
Lynn Lake	Town	May 9, 1959	579	494	+17.2%	867.53	0.7
Melita	Town	May 15, 1902	1,041	1,042	−0.1%	3.19	326.3
Minnedosa	Town	March 2, 1883	2,741	2,449	+11.9%	14.95	183.3
Morden	City	May 1, 1895	9,929	8,668	+14.5%	16.29	609.5
Morris	Town	January 29, 1883	1,975	1,885	+4.8%	5.91	334.2
Neepawa	Town	November 23, 1883	5,685	4,609	+23.3%	17.09	332.7
Niverville	Town	January 1, 1969	5,947	4,610	+29.0%	8.70	683.6
The Pas	Town	May 17, 1912	5,639	5,369	+5.0%	44.69	126.2
Portage la Prairie (Note: The cities of Portage la Prairie, Selkirk, Steinbach and Thompson were originally incorporated as towns.)	City	November 12, 1880	13,270	13,304	−0.3%	24.72	536.8
Powerview-Pine Falls (Note: The Town of Powerview-Pine Falls originally incorporated under the name of the Village of Powerview. Its renaming occurred on May 1, 2005 when it simultaneously absorbed the neighbouring community of Pine Falls and changed to town status.)	Town	January 1, 1951	1,239	1,316	−5.9%	4.82	257.1
Selkirk	City	June 15, 1882	10,504	10,278	+2.2%	24.47	429.3
Snow Lake	Town	June 2, 1947	1,088	899	+21.0%	1,166.64	0.9
Ste. Anne	Town	January 1, 1963	2,891	2,114	+36.8%	4.14	698.3
Steinbach	City	December 31, 1946	17,806	16,022	+11.1%	37.56	474.1
Stonewall	Town	August 14, 1906	5,046	4,809	+4.9%	5.96	846.6
St-Pierre-Jolys (Note: The Village of St-Pierre-Jolys originally incorporated under the name of the Village of St. Pierre. Its renaming occurred on January 1, 1977.)	Village	December 31, 1947	1,305	1,170	+11.5%	2.61	500.0
Swan River	Town	May 11, 1908	4,049	4,014	+0.9%	6.81	594.6
Teulon	Town	May 6, 1919	1,196	1,201	−0.4%	3.23	370.3
Thompson	City	January 1, 1967	13,035	13,678	−4.7%	16.62	784.3
Virden	Town	August 2, 1890	3,118	3,322	−6.1%	8.96	348.0
Winkler	City	April 7, 1906	13,745	12,660	+8.6%	20.73	663.0
Winnipeg	City	November 8, 1873	749,607	705,244	+6.3%	461.78	1,623.3
Winnipeg Beach	Town	November 2, 1909	1,439	1,145	+25.7%	3.91	368.0
Sub-total cities			892,517	842,097	+6.0%	707.02	1,262.4
Sub-total towns			60,963	56,882	+7.2%	5,552.10	11.0
Sub-total villages			2,294	1,933	+18.7%	5.41	424.0
Total urban municipalities			955,774	900,912	+6.1%	6,264.53	152.6
Province of Manitoba			1,342,153	1,278,365	+5.0%	540,310.19	2.5

== Rural municipalities ==
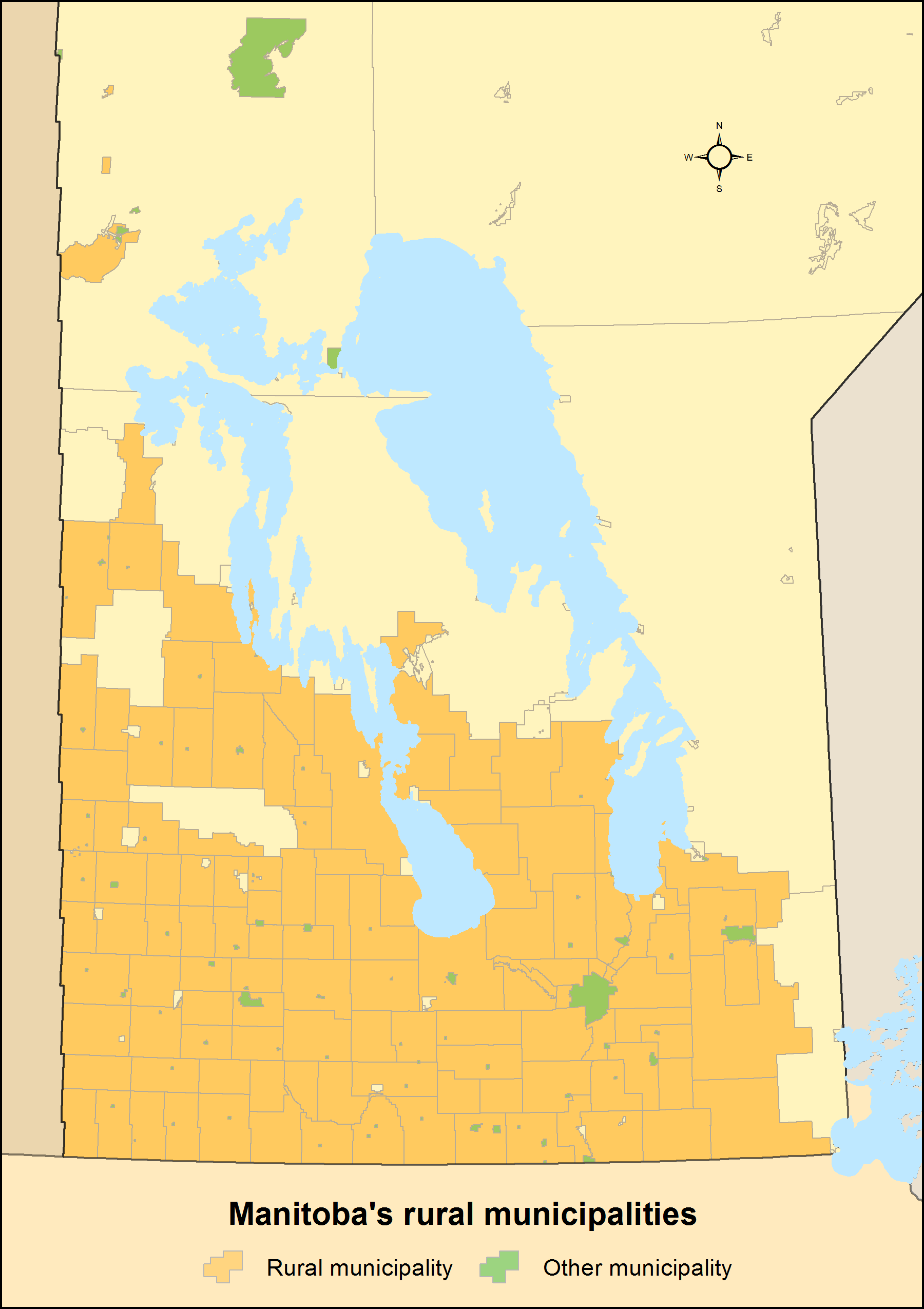
Distribution of Manitoba's 116 rural municipalities (2011)

Manitoba's Municipal Act, enacted in 1987, defines rural municipality (RM) as an incorporated "area with at least 1,000 residents and a population density of less than 400 residents per square kilometre." Manitoba has 98 rural municipalities that had a cumulative population of 313,064 in the 2021 census. These totals represent 23.3% of Manitoba's population and 18.8% of its land area. The province's largest and smallest rural municipalities by population are the Hanover and the Ethelbert with populations of 17,216 and 648 respectively. The province's largest and smallest rural municipalities by area the RM of Reynolds and the Victoria Beach with land areas of 3,559.65 km^{2} (1,374.39 mi^{2}) and 20.71 km^{2} (8.00 mi^{2}) respectively.

Of Manitoba's 98 rural municipalities, 8 have populations less than the current minimum population requirement of 1,000. All of these were either incorporated as rural municipalities prior to the Municipal Act being enacted in 1996 or formed by the amalgamation of two or more municipalities incorporated prior to 1996. Many municipalities previously under the minimum population were required to amalgamate by the Government of Manitoba's Municipal Amalgamations Act enacted in 2013. However, the legislation excluded "resort municipalities" like Victoria Beach and the government allowed some of the new amalgamated municipalities to form with a combined population under 1,000.

List of rural municipalities in Manitoba
Name	Incorporation date	2021 Census of Population				
Name	Incorporation date	Population (2021)	Population (2016)	Change	Land area (km^{2})	Population density (/km^{2})
Alexander (Note: The rural municipalities of Alexander, Alonsa, Armstrong, Fisher, Grahamdale, Kelsey, Mountain, Park, Piney, Reynolds and Stuartburn were originally incorporated as local government districts.)	January 1, 1945	3,854	3,333	+15.6%	1,560.05	2.5
Alonsa	January 1, 1945	1,210	1,247	−3.0%	3,006.17	0.4
Argyle	August 15, 1881	994	1,025	−3.0%	768.63	1.3
Armstrong	January 1, 1945	1,967	1,792	+9.8%	1,868.24	1.1
Bifrost-Riverton	January 1, 2015	3,320	3,378	−1.7%	1,643.14	2.0
Boissevain-Morton	January 1, 2015	2,309	2,353	−1.9%	1,102.38	2.1
Brenda-Waskada	January 1, 2015	650	674	−3.6%	775.64	0.8
Brokenhead	November 15, 1900	5,414	5,122	+5.7%	749.69	7.2
Cartier	February 21, 1914	3,344	3,368	−0.7%	552.94	6.0
Cartwright-Roblin	January 1, 2015	1,336	1,308	+2.1%	705.27	1.9
Clanwilliam-Erickson	January 1, 2015	1,012	860	+17.7%	358.05	2.8
Coldwell	November 19, 1912	1,313	1,254	+4.7%	891.85	1.5
Cornwallis	December 22, 1883	4,568	4,506	+1.4%	500.51	9.1
Dauphin	November 26, 1897	2,136	2,298	−7.0%	1,512.79	1.4
De Salaberry	January 1, 2015	3,918	3,580	+9.4%	667.57	5.9
Deloraine-Winchester	December 22, 1883	1,478	1,489	−0.7%	728.13	2.0
Dufferin	November 1, 1890	2,543	2,435	+4.4%	916.11	2.8
East St. Paul	November 3, 1915	9,725	9,372	+3.8%	41.79	232.7
Ellice-Archie	January 1, 2015	831	887	−6.3%	1,153.14	0.7
Elton	December 22, 1883	1,276	1,273	+0.2%	576.14	2.2
Emerson-Franklin	January 1, 2015	2,437	2,537	−3.9%	970.19	2.5
Ethelbert	January 1, 2015	648	607	+6.8%	1,134.59	0.6
Fisher	January 1, 1945	1,845	1,827	+1.0%	1,486.17	1.2
Gilbert Plains	January 1, 2015	1,420	1,470	−3.4%	1,050.15	1.4
Gimli	August 15, 1881	6,569	6,181	+6.3%	318.10	20.7
Glenboro-South Cypress	January 1, 2015	1,123	1,550	−27.5%	1,071.64	1.0
Glenella-Lansdowne	January 1, 2015	1,133	1,181	−4.1%	1,274.74	0.9
Grahamdale	January 1, 1945	1,278	1,334	−4.2%	2,365.94	0.5
Grandview	January 1, 2015	1,419	1,482	−4.3%	1,147.99	1.2
Grassland	January 1, 2015	1,583	1,561	+1.4%	1,350.34	1.2
Grey	January 1, 2015	2,517	2,648	−4.9%	968.90	2.6
Hamiota	January 1, 2015	1,234	1,225	+0.7%	577.68	2.1
Hanover	May 25, 1881	17,216	15,540	+10.8%	730.44	23.6
Harrison Park	January 1, 2015	1,852	1,617	+14.5%	964.55	1.9
Headingley	May 9, 1992	4,331	3,579	+21.0%	107.53	40.3
Kelsey	January 1, 1945	2,181	2,419	−9.8%	850.41	2.6
Killarney - Turtle Mountain	August 15, 1881	3,520	3,429	+2.7%	930.02	3.8
La Broquerie	May 25, 1881	6,725	6,076	+10.7%	578.97	11.6
Lac du Bonnet	April 6, 1912	3,563	3,121	+14.2%	1,097.61	3.2
Lakeshore	January 1, 2015	1,186	1,363	−13.0%	1,295.64	0.9
Lorne	January 1, 2015	2,904	3,041	−4.5%	923.03	3.1
Louise	January 1, 2015	2,025	1,918	+5.6%	934.81	2.2
Macdonald	May 25, 1881	8,120	7,162	+13.4%	1,156.11	7.0
McCreary	January 1, 2015	748	892	−16.1%	527.77	1.4
Minitonas-Bowsman	January 1, 2015	1,587	1,653	−4.0%	1,199.17	1.3
Minto-Odanah	January 1, 2015	1,121	1,189	−5.7%	746.31	1.5
Montcalm	May 25, 1881	1,278	1,260	+1.4%	468.25	2.7
Morris	February 14, 1880	3,049	3,047	+0.1%	1,035.32	2.9
Mossey River	January 1, 2015	1,450	1,145	+26.6%	1,119.96	1.3
Mountain (Note: Statistics Canada divides the RM of Mountain into two parts. In the 2016 census, the north portion had a population of 559, a -12.2% change from its 2011 population of 637, and a land area and population density of 990.69 km^{2} (382.51 sq mi) and 1.5 respectively. Meanwhile, the south portion had a population of 419, a -10.2% change from its 2011 population of 467, and a land area and population density of 1,617.08 km^{2} (624.36 sq mi) and 0.7 respectively.)	January 1, 1945	980	978	+0.2%	2,603.43	0.4
Norfolk-Treherne	January 1, 2015	1,770	1,751	+1.1%	737.90	2.4
North Cypress-Langford	January 1, 2015	3,011	2,745	+9.7%	1,762.30	1.7
North Norfolk	January 1, 2015	3,915	3,853	+1.6%	1,158.26	3.4
Oakland-Wawanesa	January 1, 2015	1,758	1,690	+4.0%	578.82	3.0
Oakview	January 1, 2015	1,928	1,626	+18.6%	1,141.98	1.7
Pembina	January 1, 2015	2,406	2,347	+2.5%	1,130.57	2.1
Piney	January 1, 1945	1,843	1,726	+6.8%	2,430.32	0.8
Pipestone	December 22, 1883	1,422	1,458	−2.5%	1,149.86	1.2
Portage la Prairie	February 14, 1880	6,888	6,975	−1.2%	1,973.45	3.5
Prairie Lakes	January 1, 2015	1,625	1,453	+11.8%	1,070.95	1.5
Prairie View	January 1, 2015	2,161	2,088	+3.5%	1,694.69	1.3
Reynolds	January 1, 1945	1,344	1,338	+0.4%	3,559.65	0.4
Rhineland	January 1, 2015	5,819	5,945	−2.1%	958.48	6.1
Riding Mountain West	January 1, 2015	1,442	1,420	+1.5%	1,624.99	0.9
Ritchot	November 1, 1890	7,469	6,679	+11.8%	332.23	22.5
Riverdale	January 1, 2015	1,803	2,133	−15.5%	576.02	3.1
Roblin	January 1, 2015	3,089	3,214	−3.9%	1,694.95	1.8
Rockwood	February 14, 1880	8,440	7,823	+7.9%	1,184.89	7.1
Roland	November 1, 1908	1,145	1,129	+1.4%	484.47	2.4
Rosedale	December 22, 1883	1,524	1,672	−8.9%	864.68	1.8
Rossburn	January 1, 2015	973	976	−0.3%	672.29	1.4
Rosser	March 11, 1893	1,270	1,372	−7.4%	441.74	2.9
Russell-Binscarth	January 1, 2015	2,596	2,442	+6.3%	569.70	4.6
Sifton	January 1, 2015	1,239	1,256	−1.4%	839.50	1.5
Souris-Glenwood	January 1, 2015	2,547	2,562	−0.6%	579.69	4.4
Springfield	September 27, 1873	16,142	15,342	+5.2%	1,096.17	14.7
St. Andrews	February 14, 1880	11,723	11,913	−1.6%	739.61	15.9
St. Clements	December 22, 1883	11,586	10,876	+6.5%	711.17	16.3
St. François Xavier	February 14, 1880	1,449	1,411	+2.7%	205.14	7.1
St. Laurent	May 25, 1881	1,542	1,338	+15.2%	480.15	3.2
Stanley	November 1, 1890	8,981	8,969	+0.1%	835.18	10.8
Ste. Anne	February 14, 1880	5,584	5,003	+11.6%	476.81	11.7
Ste. Rose	January 1, 2015	1,591	1,712	−7.1%	630.04	2.5
Stuartburn	January 1, 1945	1,731	1,648	+5.0%	1,161.45	1.5
Swan Valley West	January 1, 2015	2,759	2,829	−2.5%	1,716.84	1.6
Taché	February 14, 1880	11,916	11,568	+3.0%	580.64	20.5
Thompson	November 1, 1908	1,518	1,422	+6.8%	531.24	2.9
Two Borders	January 1, 2015	1,120	1,175	−4.7%	2,321.73	0.5
Victoria	November 15, 1902	1,188	1,132	+4.9%	703.54	1.7
Victoria Beach	March 14, 1919	689	398	+73.1%	20.71	33.3
Wallace-Woodworth	January 1, 2015	2,748	2,948	−6.8%	1,977.43	1.4
West Interlake	January 1, 2015	2,228	2,162	+3.1%	1,643.72	1.4
West St. Paul	November 3, 1915	6,682	5,368	+24.5%	87.49	76.4
WestLake-Gladstone	January 1, 2015	3,273	3,154	+3.8%	1,909.82	1.7
Whitehead	December 22, 1883	1,679	1,651	+1.7%	577.60	2.9
Whitemouth	March 1, 1905	1,630	1,557	+4.7%	697.35	2.3
Woodlands	February 14, 1880	3,797	3,416	+11.2%	1,197.59	3.2
Yellowhead	January 1, 2015	1,841	1,948	−5.5%	1,093.17	1.7
Total rural municipalities		313,064	301,199	+3.9%	101,670.96	3.1
Province of Manitoba		1,342,153	1,278,365	+5.0%	540,310.19	2.5

== Local government districts ==
Manitoba's Local Government Districts Act, enacted in 1987, defines a local government district (LGD) as "an area or areas that is or are wholly or partly in unorganized territory or in a disorganized municipality" with inhabitants. LGDs are incorporated by Manitoba's Lieutenant Governor in Council through passage of a regulation.

Manitoba has two LGDs: Mystery Lake and Pinawa. For municipal statistical purposes, Mystery Lake is considered a rural municipality while Pinawa is considered an urban municipality.

List of local government districts in Manitoba
Name	Incorporation date	2021 Census of Population				
Name	Incorporation date	Population (2021)	Population (2016)	Change	Land area (km^{2})	Population density (/km^{2})
Mystery Lake	December 5, 1956	0	0	NA	3,351.37	0.0
Pinawa	January 4, 1962	1,558	1,504	+3.6%	126.51	12.3
Total local government districts		1,558	1,504	+3.6%	3,477.88	0.4
Province of Manitoba		1,342,153	1,278,365	+5.0%	540,310.19	2.5

== See also ==
- Amalgamation of Winnipeg
- List of census agglomerations in Manitoba
- List of communities in Manitoba by population
- Manitoba municipal amalgamations, 2015
