= List of villages in Manitoba =

A village is an incorporated urban municipality in the Canadian province of Manitoba. Under the province's Municipal Act of 1997, a community must have a minimum population of 1,000 and a minimum density of 400 people per square kilometre to incorporate as an urban municipality. As an urban municipality, the community has the option to be named a village, town or urban municipality. It also has the option of being named a city once it has a minimum population of 7,500.

Manitoba has two villages that have a cumulative population of 1,933 in the Canada 2016 census. There were several communities with village status prior to January 1, 2015, when most were eliminated through municipal amalgamations. St-Pierre-Jolys, which has a population of 1,170, is the only village surpassing the Municipal Act's 1,000-person threshold. Dunnottar, which has a population of 763, has been granted an exemption from the minimum population requirement.

== List ==
Name	Population (2016)	Population (2011)	Change (%)	Area (km²)	Population density
Dunnottar	763	696	8.7	2.8	272.5
St-Pierre-Jolys	1,170	1,099	6.5	2.6	450.0
Total villages	1,933	1,795	7.7	5.4	358.0

== Former villages ==
A list of formerly incorporated villages, excluding current and former towns and cities that previously held village status.

Name	Dissolved	Currently part of
Benito	January 1, 2015	Municipality of Swan Valley West
Binscarth	January 1, 2015	Municipality of Russell – Binscarth
Bowsman	January 1, 2015	Municipality of Minitonas – Bowsman
Cartwright	January 1, 2015	Cartwright – Roblin Municipality
Crystal City	January 1, 2015	Municipality of Louise
Elkhorn	January 1, 2015	Rural Municipality of Wallace – Woodworth
Ethelbert	January 1, 2015	Municipality of Ethelbert
Foxwarren	January 1, 1967	Prairie View Municipality
Garson	January 1, 2003	Rural Municipality of Brokenhead
Glenboro	January 1, 2015	Municipality of Glenboro – South Cypress
Great Falls	January 1, 1973	Rural Municipality of Alexander
McCreary	January 1, 2015	Municipality of McCreary
Napinka	January 1, 1986	Municipality of Brenda – Waskada
Notre Dame de Lourdes	January 1, 2015	Notre-Dame-de-Lourdes, Manitoba
Powerview	May 1, 2005	Town of Powerview-Pine Falls
Riverton	January 1, 2015	Municipality of Bifrost – Riverton
St. Claude	January 1, 2015	Rural Municipality of Grey
St. Lazare	January 1, 2015	Rural Municipality of Ellice – Archie
Somerset	January 1, 2015	Municipality of Lorne
Waskada	January 1, 2015	Municipality of Brenda – Waskada
Wawanesa	January 1, 2015	Municipality of Oakland – Wawanesa
Winnipegosis	January 1, 2015	Rural Municipality of Mossey River

== See also ==
- List of communities in Manitoba
- List of ghost towns in Manitoba
- List of municipalities in Manitoba
  - List of cities in Manitoba
  - List of rural municipalities in Manitoba
    - List of local urban districts in Manitoba
  - List of towns in Manitoba
- Manitoba municipal amalgamations, 2015
