= Rural Municipality of Ellice =

Rural municipality in Manitoba, Canada

Coordinates: 50°27′41″N 101°20′18″W

The Rural Municipality of Ellice is a former rural municipality (RM) in the Canadian province of Manitoba. It was originally incorporated as a rural municipality on December 22, 1883. It ceased on January 1, 2015 as a result of its provincially mandated amalgamation with the RM of Archie and the Village of St. Lazare to form the Rural Municipality of Ellice – Archie.

The RM was named after Edward Ellice, Sr., a British merchant and politician. In its northwestern section was a part of the Gambler 63 First Nations Indian reserve.

Fort Ellice, a Hudson's Bay Company trading post built in 1831, was located near the junction of the Assiniboine and Qu'Appelle rivers. It was an important stop on the Carlton Trail, which ran from the Red River settlement to Fort Edmonton. It became a North-West Mounted Police post in 1875.

== Communities ==
- Chillon
- Victor
- Wattsview
