= Mary Carter (judge) =

Saskatchewan judge (1923-2010)

Mary Yvonne Carter (1923–2010) was a Saskatchewan judge. She is notable as the second female magistrate appointed in Saskatchewan history (in 1960) and one of the earliest female law graduates in that province (in 1947). She was later elevated to the Court of Queen's Bench for Saskatchewan, where she sat for many years.

== History ==
Mary Carter was born Mary Munn on October 11, 1923 in Cromer, Manitoba. Her family also lived in the Manitoba towns of Elkhorn, Virden and Carberry, before moving to Saskatoon, Saskatchewan in 1938.

Carter graduated from Nutana Collegiate in 1941 and subsequently earned degrees in arts and law from the University of Saskatchewan. She was called to the Saskatchewan bar in 1948 and opened a law practice with Peter Makaroff and her husband, Roger Carter. The Carters had met as fellow law students.

Carter was appointed a provincial magistrate in 1960, being the second female so appointed in Saskatchewan, following the appointment of Tillie Taylor in 1959. Both were appointed to sit in Saskatoon and were preceded in appointment by Regina juvenile court judges Ethel MacLachlan and Margaret Burgess. Ethel MacLachlan, a non-lawyer, was appointed the first juvenile court judge in Saskatchewan in 1917, being also the first woman in the province to be named a judge. MacLachlan was succeeded as a juvenile court judge by lawyer Margaret Burgess, appointed in 1935.

In 1968, both Carter and Taylor, despite presiding in Saskatchewan, were featured in an Ottawa Citizen article, "The Female View from the Magistrate's Bench: We're Still Putting People in Jail Because They're Poor" Both were considered to be particularly sensitive to social justice issues due to being parents, as well as magistrates. At the time, Carter was the mother of six children and was sitting full-time during the day as a family court judge, prior to joining three other magistrates in the evening to sit in police court. The journalistic focus on Carter's maternal status, as opposed to her superior academic and professional accomplishments, was the subject of later criticism.

Carter was elevated to the Saskatchewan District Court in 1978, where her work became part of a pilot project to the development of a Unified Family Court, further to Saskatchewan's Unified Family Court Act, passed that same year. She became a judge of the Court of Queen's Bench for Saskatchewan in 1981 and sat in that superior court until 1998, when she retired, at the age of 75. Among her reported decisions is Landrie v. Landrie, in which she held that the provisions of the Canadian Divorce Act take precedence over the comparable provincial legislation, in relation to enforcement of spousal support orders, post-divorce. In Marland v. Nelson, she canvassed the jurisdiction of the court to vary an order under the Saskatchewan Matrimonial Property Act.

Mary Carter died in Saskatoon on October 1, 2010.
