= Nutana Collegiate =

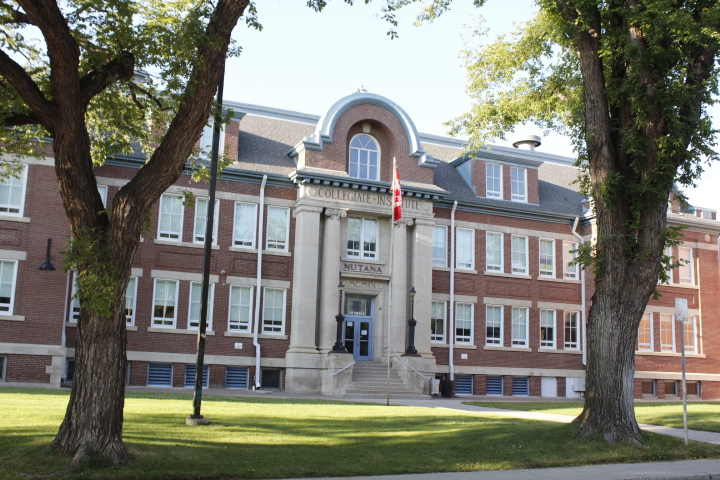
- Nutana Collegiate

Location
- 411 - 11th Street East; Saskatoon, Saskatchewan, S7N 0E9; Canada; 52.118993°N 106.661410°W

Information
- Type: Secondary
- Motto: Working together towards personal excellence in a safe, caring, respectful learning community
- Opened: 1909
- School board: Saskatoon Public Schools
- Principal: Bernadette Laliberte
- Grades: Grade 9 to Grade 12
- Enrollment: 500 (2022)
- Education system: Public
- Language: English
- Colours: Blue and White
- Team name: Blues
- Website: www.spsd.sk.ca/school/nutana/

Nutana Collegiate is a high school located in the Nutana neighbourhood of central Saskatoon, Saskatchewan, serving students from grades 9 through 12. Nutana was the first public high school in Saskatoon and is part of the Saskatoon Public School Division. The school possesses a significant collection of early Canadian art.

== History ==
Nutana Collegiate Institute was founded as Saskatoon Collegiate Institute in 1909 and was renamed in 1923 after Bedford Road Collegiate Institute was opened in that same year. The use of "collegiate" in the school's name reflects the school's original curriculum and intended role as a preparatory school for students expecting to attend university and enter professional careers.

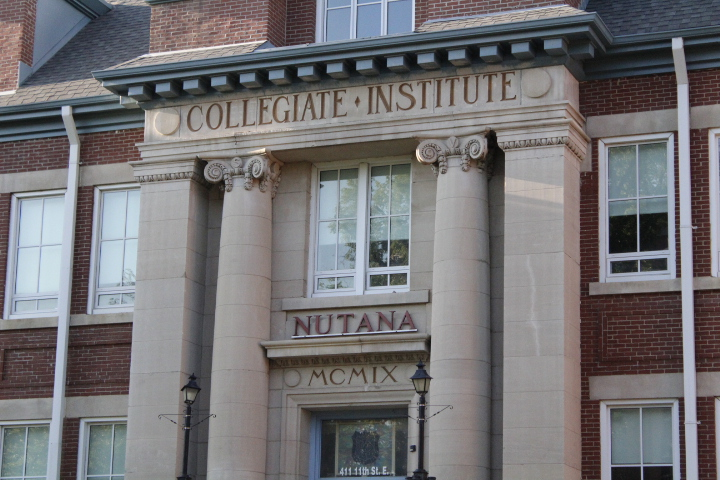

The school is located on a parcel of land that was a city park known as the Louise Grounds. The eastern portion of this land is occupied by the school's playfields and is now known as Chief Darcy Bear Park.

The Classic French Renaissance style building was designed by Regina architects Storey & Van Egmond. The school provided the first public meeting place in Saskatoon and during its early years provided space for the Saskatoon Normal School. During 1910–12 the University of Saskatchewan held classes during construction of its own campus. The school was also home to Saskatoon's first public art gallery.

Between 2009 and 2012 the school underwent a $14 million renovation that included general building upgrades, new windows, and classroom and auditorium renovations. In 2013 the project received an Architectural Heritage Award presented by the Lieutenant Governor of Saskatchewan.

== Academic programs ==
Nutana offers courses in four academies:

- Academic Upgrading Academy: for mature students ages 18 and older;
- Career and Experiential Learning Academy: support and programs for students to explore career areas and develop skills;
- Community Engagement Academy: includes service agency and business partners that provide opportunities linked to community resources and programs;
- Tourism Academy: offers courses and opportunities for students to prepare for a tourism career and develop the skills necessary for postsecondary education; the academy offers the Gold Level Program of the Canadian Academy of Travel and Tourism.

== Physical education ==
Nutana offers physical education programs in two main categories:

Wellness (physical education) classes offer a variety of activities including archery, basketball, racket sports, cross- country skiing, slow pitch, swimming, tennis, volleyball, weight training

Special Physical Education classes offer archery, badminton, billiards, bowling, canoeing, curling, fitness, ice games, indoor and outdoor games, orienteering, cross-country skiing, slow pitch, swimming, tennis, and wall climbing.

== Notable alumni ==
- Matt Baldwin, three time Brier champion curler.
- Mary Carter, one of the earliest female graduates in law from the University of Saskatchewan, in 1947, and the second female magistrate appointed in Saskatchewan history, in 1960.
- Kim Coates, stage, film, and television actor.
- John Diefenbaker, 13th Prime Minister of Canada
- Joseph Heath, philosopher.
- Ray Hnatyshyn, 24th Governor General of Canada and former federal cabinet minister.
- Lawrie Skolrood, former CFL player.
- Clifford Wright (mayor), Mayor of Saskatoon from 1976 to 1988 and the first Mayor of Saskatoon to have been born in the city.
- George P. Genereux MD, Olympic Gold Medallist Trapshooting 1952 Helsinki
