= Lawrie Skolrood =

Canadian gridiron football player (born 1952)

Profile
- Positions: Tight end, Offensive tackle

Personal information
- Born: April 2, 1952 (age 74); Saskatoon, Saskatchewan, Canada
- Listed height: 6 ft 5 in (1.96 m)
- Listed weight: 240 lb (109 kg)

Career information
- High school: Nutana Collegiate
- College: North Dakota
- NFL draft: 1974: 17th round, 438th overall pick

Career history
- 1974: Saskatchewan Roughriders
- 1975–1979: Hamilton Tiger-Cats
- 1979–1987: Saskatchewan Roughriders

Awards and highlights
- All-NCC (1973)

Lawrence "Lawrie" Skolrood (born April 2, 1952) is a former tight end and offensive tackle in the Canadian Football League (CFL) for the Saskatchewan Roughriders and Hamilton Tiger-Cats. He played college football at the University of North Dakota.

== Early life ==
Skolrood attended Nutana Collegiate, where he played as a running back and outside linebacker. He accepted a football scholarship from the University of North Dakota, to play in the NCAA Division II as a tight end.

As a junior in 1972, he tallied 7 receptions for 125 receiving yards in a game against University of Nevada, Las Vegas. He also contributed to the team winning the Camellia Bowl to earn the NCAA West College Football Championship.

As a senior, he was named one of the team captains. He finished his college career with 53 receptions for 634 yards and 3 touchdowns.

In 2001, he was inducted into the University of North Dakota Athletics Hall of Fame.

== Professional career ==
Skolrood was selected by the Dallas Cowboys in the 17th round (438th overall) of the 1974 NFL draft, but opted not to sign with the team, in order to return to Canada.

In 1974, he was signed by the Saskatchewan Roughriders of the Canadian Football League. On June 12, 1975, he was traded to the Hamilton Tiger-Cats in exchange for tight end Bob Richardson.

On September 4, 1979, he was traded to the Saskatchewan Roughriders in exchange for quarterback Tom Clements. He played as a tight end during his first 6 years, posting 160 receptions for 2,244 yards and 7 touchdowns.

In 1980, he was moved to offensive tackle, where he remained for the rest of his career. His offensive line was voted "best offensive line in the CFL" for three straight years.

In 1988, he announced his retirement after playing in 218 games, which at the time ranked ninth on the All-time CFL list.

In 2008, he was inducted into the Saskatchewan Roughriders Plaza of Honor.

== Personal life ==
After football, he was named the regional district fire inspector in British Columbia. After eight years, he was named deputy chief in charge of fire prevention in Vernon, British Columbia.
