= Fort Espérance =

- Qu'Appelle River, Rocanville No. 151, Saskatchewan, Canada
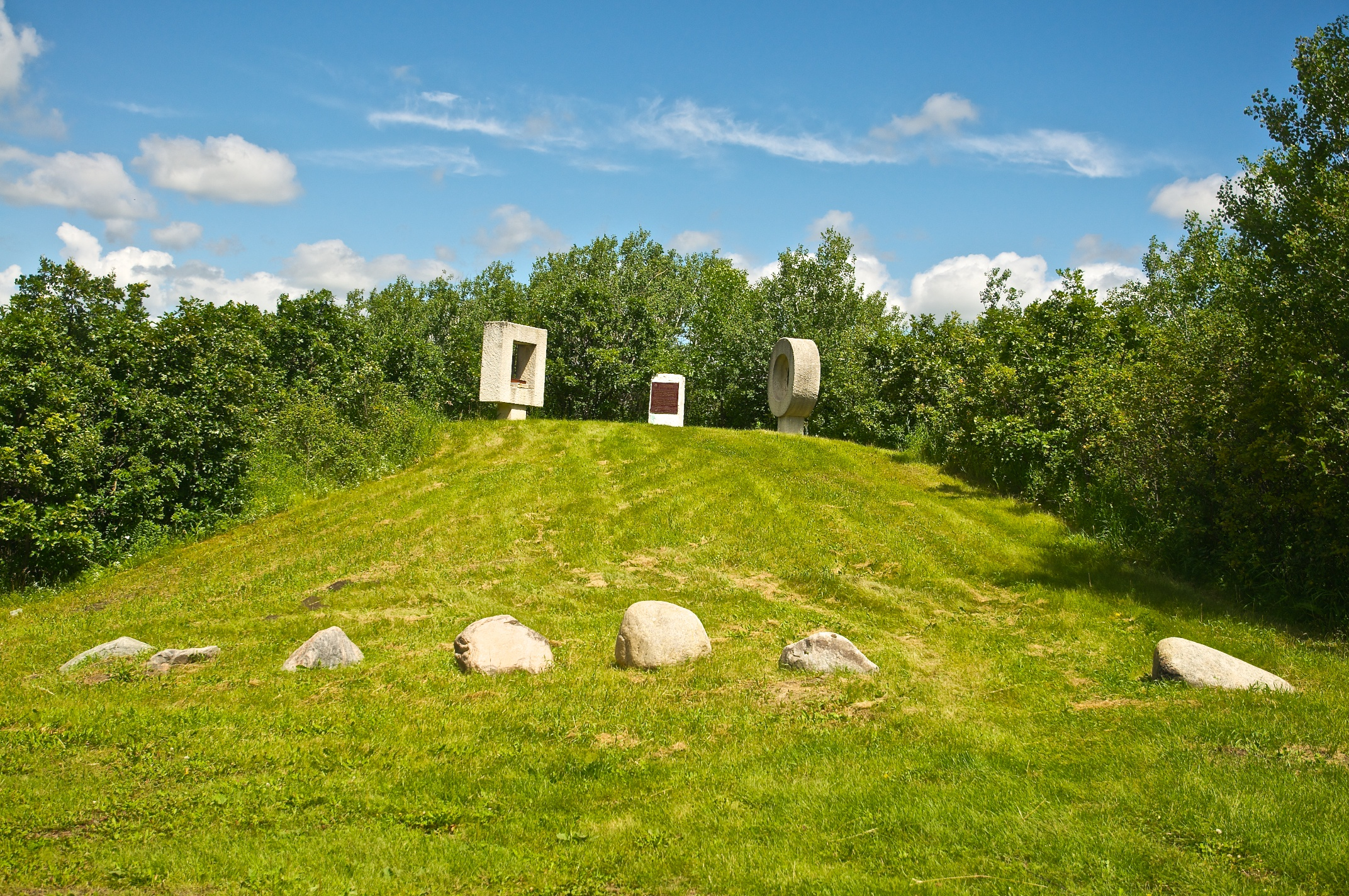
- Monument of Fort Espérance

Site information
- Type: Fort
- Controlled by: North West Company

Site history
- Built: 1787
- Battles/wars

National Historic Site of Canada
- Official name: Fort Espérance National Historic Site of Canada
- Designated: 1959

Fort Espérance was a North West Company trading post near Rocanville, Saskatchewan from 1787 until 1819. It was moved three times and was called Fort John from 1814 to 1816. There was a competing XY Company post from 1801 to 1805 and a Hudson's Bay post nearby from 1813 to 1816. It was on the Qu'Appelle River about 20 km from that river's junction with the Assiniboine River and about 7 km west of the Manitoba border. It was on the prairie in buffalo country and was mainly used as a source of pemmican which was sent down the river to Fort Bas de la Rivière at the mouth of the Winnipeg River.

- (1787–1810) In 1787 Robert Grant of the North West Company established Fort Esperance on the south bank of the Qu'Appelle about one half mile below the mouth of Big Cut Arm Creek. It was about 150 feet square and the site was subject to flooding. Relations with the plains Indians were poor. According to a hearsay report in the journal of Alexander Henry the younger as of July 1810 it was destroyed and abandoned.
- (1810–1814) A second fort was built on one of the Qu'Appelle lakes which operated for four years. During one of these years a brigade going downriver was ambushed and many of the men killed or wounded.
- (1814–1816) In 1814 it was moved to the north bank of the river two miles west of Big Cut Arm Creek and was renamed Fort John. It was 100 yards away from a Hudson's Bay post (called Fort Qu'Appelle and not to be confused with Fort Qu'Appelle, Saskatchewan built in 1855) that had been established the previous year. Fort John was inside a well-built stockade of 200 by 160 feet was the NWC's headquarters for the Assiniboine region. In the autumn of 1815, when the HBC men arrived for the winter's trade they found that their post had been burnt by the NWC. A week later the NWC men arrived. They made threats against the HBC men, but chose to do nothing. The following spring, when the HBC men took their furs downriver, the NWC attacked, took the men prisoner and burned the fort. The NWC men joined Cuthbert Grant and continued downriver and captured Brandon House. This operation culminated in the Battle of Seven Oaks in June 1816. The HBC responded by building a new post called Beaver Creek House on the Assiniboine River one and a half miles above the mouth of Beaver Creek.
- (1816–1819) In the same year (1816) the NWC moved its fort to a hill on the south bank of the river 300 yards west of the original site. The post was closed in 1819 and in 1821 whatever was left was taken over by the HBC's Beaver Creek House.

The Fort Esperance National Historic Site located nearby (50°29′38″N 101°34′40″W) was designated a National Historic Site of Canada in 1944. The XY post was a mile down river on the south bank. The location of the Qu'Appelle lake site is unknown. One source suggests Round Lake 35 km west.
