= Rural Municipality of Rocanville No. 151 =

Rural municipality in Saskatchewan, Canada

Rocanville No. 151
- Rural municipality
- Rural Municipality of Rocanville No. 151
- Location of the RM of Rocanville No. 151 in Saskatchewan
- Coordinates: 50.504°N 101.765°W
- Country: Canada
- Province: Saskatchewan
- Census division: 5
- SARM division: 1
- Formed: December 9, 1912

Government
  - Reeve: Melissa Ruhland
  - Governing body: RM of Rocanville No. 151 Council
  - Administrator: Andrea Smyth
  - Office location: Rocanville

Area (2016)
  - Land: 758.48 km^{2} (292.85 sq mi)

Population (2016)
  - Total: 507
  - Density: 0.7/km^{2} (1.8/sq mi)
- Time zone: CST
  - Summer (DST): CST
- Area codes: 306 and 639

The Rural Municipality of Rocanville No. 151 (2016 population: 507) is a rural municipality (RM) in the Canadian province of Saskatchewan within Census Division No. 5 and SARM Division No. 1. It is located in the southeast portion of the province.

== History ==
The RM of Rocanville No. 151 incorporated as a rural municipality on December 9, 1912.

== Demographics ==
Population history (1981–2016)
Year	Pop.	±%
1981	823	—
1986	732	−11.1%
1991	679	−7.2%
1996	627	−7.7%
2001	570	−9.1%
2006	554	−2.8%
2011	533	−3.8%
2016	507	−4.9%
Source: Statistics Canada via Saskatchewan Bureau of Statistics

In the 2021 Census of Population conducted by Statistics Canada, the RM of Rocanville No. 151 had a population of 544 living in 202 of its 227 total private dwellings, a change of 7.3% from its 2016 population of 507. With a land area of 748.04 km^{2} (288.82 sq mi), it had a population density of 0.7/km^{2} (1.9/sq mi) in 2021.

In the 2016 Census of Population, the RM of Rocanville No. 151 recorded a population of 507 living in 187 of its 197 total private dwellings, a −4.9% change from its 2011 population of 533. With a land area of 758.48 km^{2} (292.85 sq mi), it had a population density of 0.7/km^{2} (1.7/sq mi) in 2016.

== Economy ==
Agriculture is the major industry in the RM.

== Attractions ==
- Historic Fort Espérance
- Welwyn Regional Park
- Rocanville Cross Country Ski Trails

== Government ==
The RM of Rocanville No. 151 is governed by an elected municipal council and an appointed administrator that meets on the second Thursday of every month. The reeve of the RM is Melissa Ruhland while its administrator is Andrea Smyth. The RM's office is located in Rocanville.

== Transportation ==
The Rocanville Airport, a private airport owned by Potash Corporation of Saskatchewan, is located within the RM.
