= Rocanville =

Town in Saskatchewan, Canada

Town of Rocanville
- Town
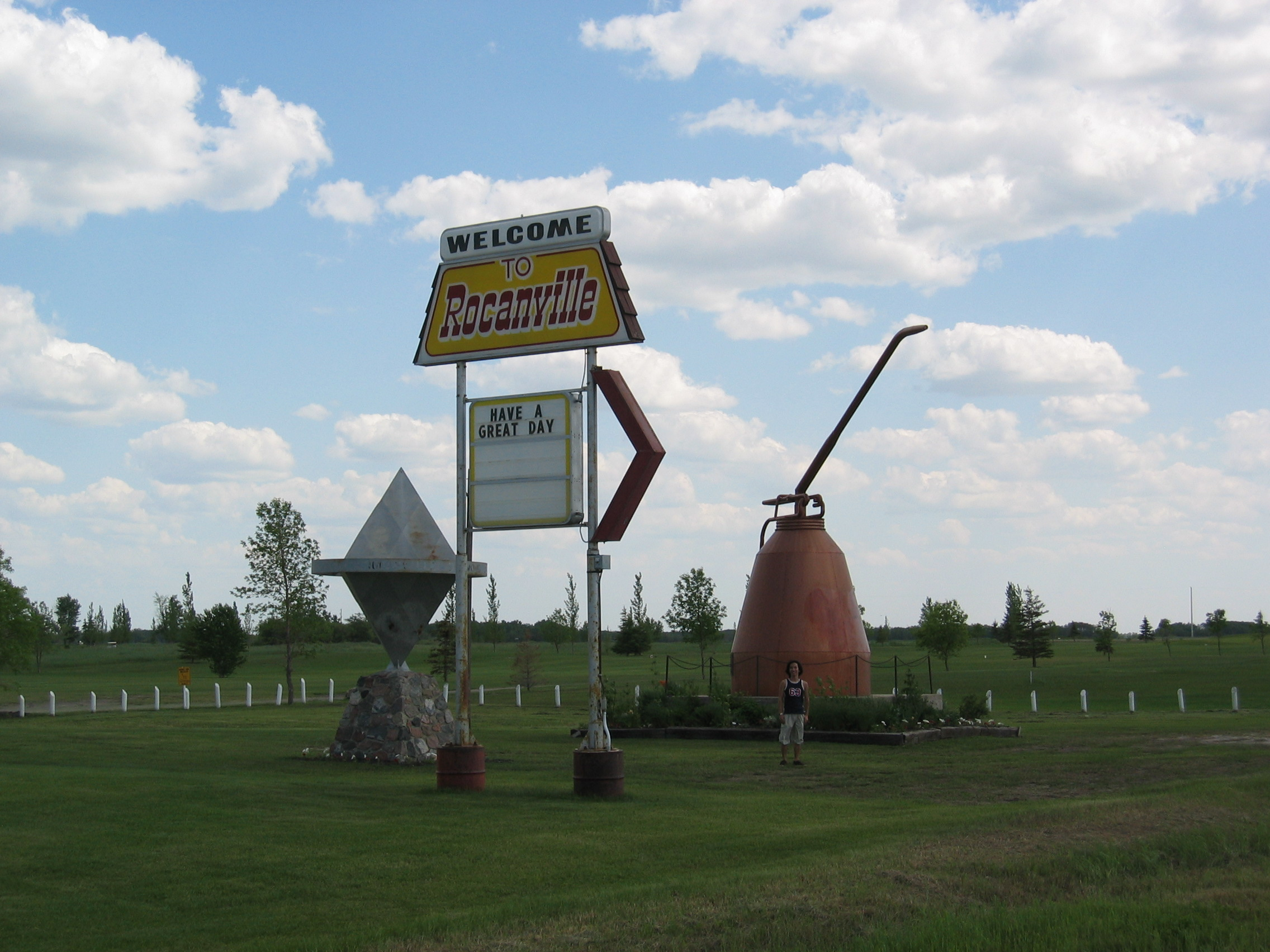

- Location within Saskatchewan Location within Canada
- Coordinates: 50°23′06″N 101°41′31″W
- Country: Canada
- Province: Saskatchewan
- Census division: 5
- Rural municipality: Rocanville No. 151
- Post office Founded: 1904
- Town established: 1904

Government
  - Mayor: Ron Reed
  - MP (Souris—Moose Mountain): Robert Kitchen
  - MLA (Moosomin): Kevin Weedmark
- Elevation: 519 m (1,703 ft)

Population (2006)
  - Total: 869
- Time zone: CST
- Postal code: S0A 3L0
- Area code: 306
- Website: rocanville.ca

Rocanville is a town in Saskatchewan, Canada, and home to the largest oil can in the world. It is home of the Nutrien Rocanville mine. Rocanville is also home of the Symons Oiler factory which produced over 1 million oil cans during the Second World War. The town erected the giant oil can to commemorate the factory.

Rocanville is also known for crop circles that were discovered there in the fall of 1996.

== History ==
Settlement in the area dates back to the fur trade, beginning in 1785 with the building of Fort Espérance, an archaeological site in Rocanville believed to contain the remains of two late 18th- and early 19th-century forts. It was designated a National Historic Site of Canada in 1944.

The first settlers of the current townsite arrived in the area in 1882 and 1883. The village was started by two brothers who built the first general store in the middle of what is now Main Street in 1902.

Rocanville was incorporated as a village on March 24, 1904, a short time after the railroad reached the area and is named for the town's first postmaster, Rocan de Bastien, who served as overseer of the village.

It became a town on August 1, 1967.

The Rocanville and District Museum Site, the Rocanville Farmers Building and the Symons Metalworks have all been designated as Municipal Heritage Properties under the provincial Heritage Property Act.

Rocanville's potash mine produced its first train car load of potash on September 25, 1970. Upon opening, it was owned by the Potash Corporation of Saskatchewan, which has since merged with Agrium to become Nutrien. It is the largest of Nutrien's six potash mines in Saskatchewan.

== Demographics ==
In the 2021 Census of Population conducted by Statistics Canada, Rocanville had a population of 889 living in 398 of its 471 total private dwellings, a change of 3% from its 2016 population of 863. With a land area of 2.36 km^{2} (0.91 sq mi), it had a population density of 376.7/km^{2} (975.6/sq mi) in 2021.

The town is governed by a mayor and five councillors.

== Sports ==
The town of Rocanville is home to the Rocanville Tigers senior team in the Sask. East Hockey League. It also hosts minor hockey and baseball, along with curling.

The local indoor pool is undergoing a significant refurbishment project and is expected to reopen in 2025.

The town also has a golf course, the Rocanville Town and Country Golf Club.

== Notable people ==
- Jessica Campbell, the first full-time female assistant coach in NHL history.

== Climate ==
Climate data for Rocanville
Month	Jan	Feb	Mar	Apr	May	Jun	Jul	Aug	Sep	Oct	Nov	Dec	Year
Record high °C (°F)	13 (55)	13 (55)	22 (72)	34.4 (93.9)	37.8 (100.0)	37.8 (100.0)	38.9 (102.0)	39 (102)	35 (95)	30 (86)	23 (73)	13 (55)	39 (102)
Mean daily maximum °C (°F)	−11.5 (11.3)	−7.3 (18.9)	−0.6 (30.9)	9.9 (49.8)	18.3 (64.9)	22.8 (73.0)	25.4 (77.7)	24.8 (76.6)	18 (64)	10.6 (51.1)	−1 (30)	−8.9 (16.0)	8.4 (47.1)
Daily mean °C (°F)	−16.6 (2.1)	−12.2 (10.0)	−5.5 (22.1)	4 (39)	11.7 (53.1)	16.4 (61.5)	18.9 (66.0)	17.9 (64.2)	11.8 (53.2)	5.1 (41.2)	−5.2 (22.6)	−13.2 (8.2)	2.7 (36.9)
Mean daily minimum °C (°F)	−21.6 (−6.9)	−17.1 (1.2)	−10.4 (13.3)	−2 (28)	5 (41)	10.1 (50.2)	12.4 (54.3)	11 (52)	5.5 (41.9)	−0.5 (31.1)	−9.4 (15.1)	−18 (0)	−2.9 (26.8)
Record low °C (°F)	−45 (−49)	−41.7 (−43.1)	−38.9 (−38.0)	−26.1 (−15.0)	−16 (3)	−5 (23)	2.2 (36.0)	−5 (23)	−6.7 (19.9)	−23 (−9)	−36 (−33)	−41.5 (−42.7)	−45 (−49)
Average precipitation mm (inches)	22.8 (0.90)	16.3 (0.64)	23.4 (0.92)	20.7 (0.81)	48.5 (1.91)	75.5 (2.97)	61.5 (2.42)	56.2 (2.21)	51.9 (2.04)	25.1 (0.99)	16.5 (0.65)	22.7 (0.89)	440.9 (17.36)
Source: Environment Canada

== See also ==
- List of communities in Saskatchewan
- List of towns in Saskatchewan
