= Kola, Manitoba =

Community in Manitoba, Canada

Kola
- Location of Kola in Manitoba
- Coordinates: 49°50′36″N 101°22′14″W
- Country: Canada
- Province: Manitoba
- Region: Westman Region
- Census Division: No. 6

Government
  - Governing Body: Rural Municipality of Wallace Council
  - MP: Grant Jackson
  - MLA: Greg Nesbitt
- Time zone: UTC−6 (CST)
  - Summer (DST): UTC−5 (CDT)
- Postal Code: R0M 1B0
- Area code: 204
- NTS Map: 062F14
- GNBC Code: GANUH

Kola is an unincorporated community in southwestern Manitoba, Canada. It is located approximately 31 kilometres (19 mi) west of Virden and approximately 3 kilometres (1.9 mi) east of the Saskatchewan boundary in the Rural Municipality of Wallace.

The community is accessible by vehicle via PR 257 and PR 542.

== See also ==
- Pipestone Creek
