= Welwyn, Saskatchewan =

Community in Saskatchewan, Canada

Welwyn
- Special service area
- Location within Saskatchewan Location within Canada
- Coordinates: 50.324984°N 101.519314°W
- Country: Canada
- Province: Saskatchewan
- Census division: 5
- Rural municipality: Moosomin No. 121
- Incorporated (village): June 11, 1907
- Dissolved (special service area): May 1, 2018

Area (2016)
  - Land: 0.64 km^{2} (0.25 sq mi)

Population (2016)
  - Total: 133
  - Density: 208.1/km^{2} (539/sq mi)
- Time zone: UTC-6 (CST)
- Area code: 306
- Highways: Highway 308 / Highway 600
- Railway: Canadian Pacific Railway Rocanville subdivision

Welwyn is a special service area in the Rural Municipality of Moosomin No. 121, Saskatchewan, Canada that held village status prior to May 2018. It is located in the southeastern portion of Saskatchewan, near the Manitoba border. The community was named for Welwyn, in Hertfordshire, England at the suggestion of James Wake, who homesteaded just across the Manitoba border. In 2016, the population was 133.

== History ==
Welwyn incorporated as a village on June 11, 1907. It restructured on May 1, 2018, relinquishing its village status in favour of becoming a special service area under the jurisdiction of the Rural Municipality of Moosomin No. 121.

== Demographics ==
In the 2016 Census of Population conducted by Statistics Canada, Welwyn recorded a population of 133 living in 61 of its 61 total private dwellings, a −1.5% change from its 2011 population of 135. With a land area of 0.64 km^{2} (0.25 sq mi), it had a population density of 207.8/km^{2} (538.2/sq mi) in 2016.

== Welwyn Centennial Regional Park ==
Welwyn Centennial Regional Park (50.3408°N 101.5197°W) is a regional park about 1.6 kilometres (0.99 mi) north of Welwyn in the neighbouring RM of Rocanville No. 151. It is on the south side of the mile-long reservoir on Beaver Creek. The park was built by volunteers in 1967 to commemorate the Canadian Centennial. Activities at the park include camping, swimming, picnicking, boating, and hiking through a forest of native oak trees.

== See also ==
- List of communities in Saskatchewan
- List of special service areas in Saskatchewan
