= Rural Municipality of Ellice-Archie =

Rural municipality in Manitoba, Canada

Ellice – Archie
- Rural municipality
- Rural Municipality of Ellice – Archie
- Location of Ellice – Archie in Manitoba
- Coordinates: 50.323901°N 101.272936°W
- Country: Canada
- Province: Manitoba
- Region: Westman
- Incorporated (amalgamated): January 1, 2015

Area
  - Total: 1,155.80 km^{2} (446.26 sq mi)

Population (2021)
  - Total: 831
  - Density: 0.719/km^{2} (1.86/sq mi)
- Time zone: UTC-6 (CST)
  - Summer (DST): UTC-5 (CDT)
- Website: rmofellicearchie.ca

The Rural Municipality of Ellice-Archie (French: Municipalité rurale d'Ellice–Archie) is a rural municipality (RM) in the Canadian province of Manitoba.

It was established in 2015 via the amalgamation of the RMs of Archie and Ellice and the Village of St. Lazare.

== History ==
Fort Ellice, located at Beaver Creek near the junction of the Assiniboine and Qu'Appelle rivers, was founded in 1831 as a Hudson's Bay Company (HBC) trading post. Named after Edward Ellice Sr., a British merchant and politician, it was an important stop on the Carlton Trail, which ran from the Red River settlement to Fort Edmonton. On December 22, 1883, the area was incorporated as the Rural Municipality of Ellice, which included the communities of Chillon, Ste. Madeleine, Victor, Wattsview, and, until 1949, St. Lazare.

On the same day as the RM of Ellice, the Rural Municipality of Archibald was also incorporated, named for Archibald McDonald (1836–1915), a chief factor with the HBC at Fort Ellice. It included the communities of Manson, McAuley, and Willen.

Named in 1880 by Oblate missionary Father Jules Decorby, the community's founder, St. Lazare was incorporated as a village on December 31, 1949.

It ceased on January 1, 2015, as a result of its provincially mandated amalgamation with the RM of Ellice and the Village of St. Lazare to form the Rural Municipality of Ellice – Archie.

On January 1, 2015, the RMs of Archie and Ellice and the Village of St. Lazare amalgamated to establish the present-day Rural Municipality of Ellice-Archie. It was formed as a requirement of The Municipal Amalgamations Act, which required that municipalities with a population less than 1,000 amalgamate with one or more neighbouring municipalities by 2015. The Government of Manitoba initiated these amalgamations in order for municipalities to meet the 1997 minimum population requirement of 1,000 to incorporate a municipality.

== Communities ==
- Chillon
- Manson
- McAuley
- St. Lazare
- Ste. Madeleine
- Victor
- Wattsview
- Willen

== Demographics ==
In the 2021 Census of Population conducted by Statistics Canada, Ellice-Archie had a population of 831 living in 351 of its 392 total private dwellings, a change of −6.3% from its 2016 population of 887. With a land area of 1,153.14 km^{2} (445.23 sq mi), it had a population density of 0.7/km^{2} (1.9/sq mi) in 2021.

== See also ==
- List of francophone communities in Manitoba
- Fort Ellice
