= Rocanville mine =

Potash mine in Saskatchewan, Canada

Coordinates: 50.4662°N 101.5380°W

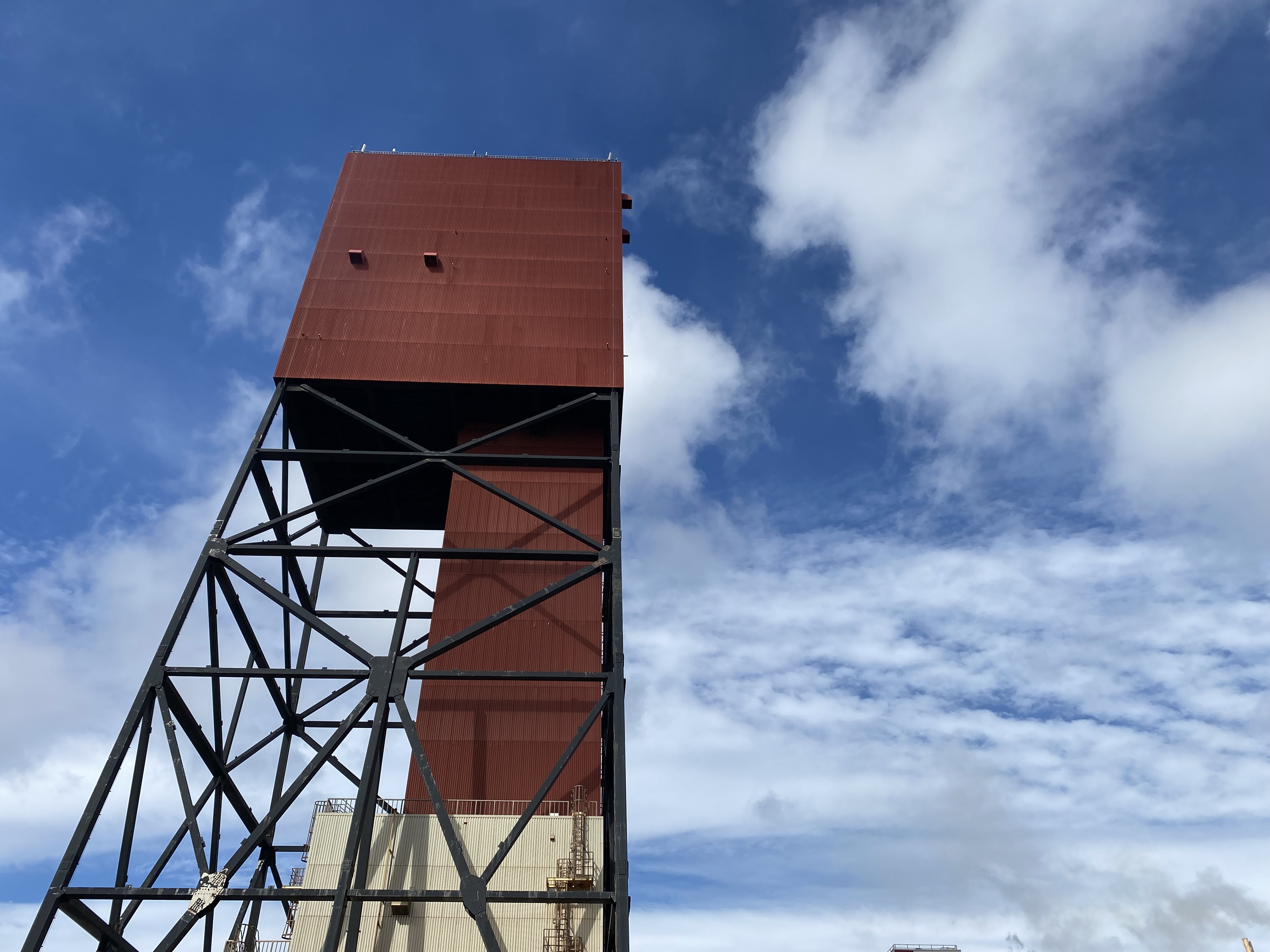

- Location in Saskatchewan Rocanville mine (Canada)
- Location: Saskatchewan, Canada
- Products: Potash

The Rocanville mine is a large potash mine located in southern Canada in Saskatchewan. Rocanville represents one of the largest potash reserves in Canada having estimated reserves of 1.13 billion tonnes of ore grading 22.5% potassium oxide equivalent.

The mine first opened in 1970 and is one of six mines owned by Nutrien in Saskatchewan. It underwent a major expansion in 2017.

== See also ==
- List of mines in Saskatchewan
