= Willen, Manitoba =

Willen
- Location of Willen in Manitoba
- Coordinates: 50°10′5″N 101°13′1″W
- Country: Canada
- Province: Manitoba
- Region: Westman Region
- Census Division: No. 15

Government
  - Governing Body: Rural Municipality of Ellice - Archie
  - MP: Dan Mazier
  - MLA: Greg Nesbitt
- Time zone: UTC−6 (CST)
  - Summer (DST): UTC−5 (CDT)
- Area code: 204
- NTS Map: 062K03
- GNBC Code: GBEDI

Willen is an unincorporated community in southwestern Manitoba, Canada. It is located approximately 41 kilometers (25 miles) northwest of Virden, Manitoba in the Rural Municipality of Ellice – Archie.
