= Manson, Manitoba =

Manson
- Location of Manson in Manitoba
- Coordinates: 50°08′12″N 101°22′06″W
- Country: Canada
- Province: Manitoba
- Region: Westman Region
- No. 15: Census Division
- Elevation: 500 m (1,640 ft)
- Time zone: UTC−6 (CST)
  - Summer (DST): UTC−5 (CDT)
- Postal Code: R0M 1J0
- Area code: 204
- NTS Map: 062K03
- GNBC Code: GAQBL

Manson is an unincorporated hamlet in Manitoba, Canada.

It is located thirteen kilometers north of the Trans-Canada Highway along PTH 41 in the Rural Municipality of Ellice – Archie.
