= Kirkella =

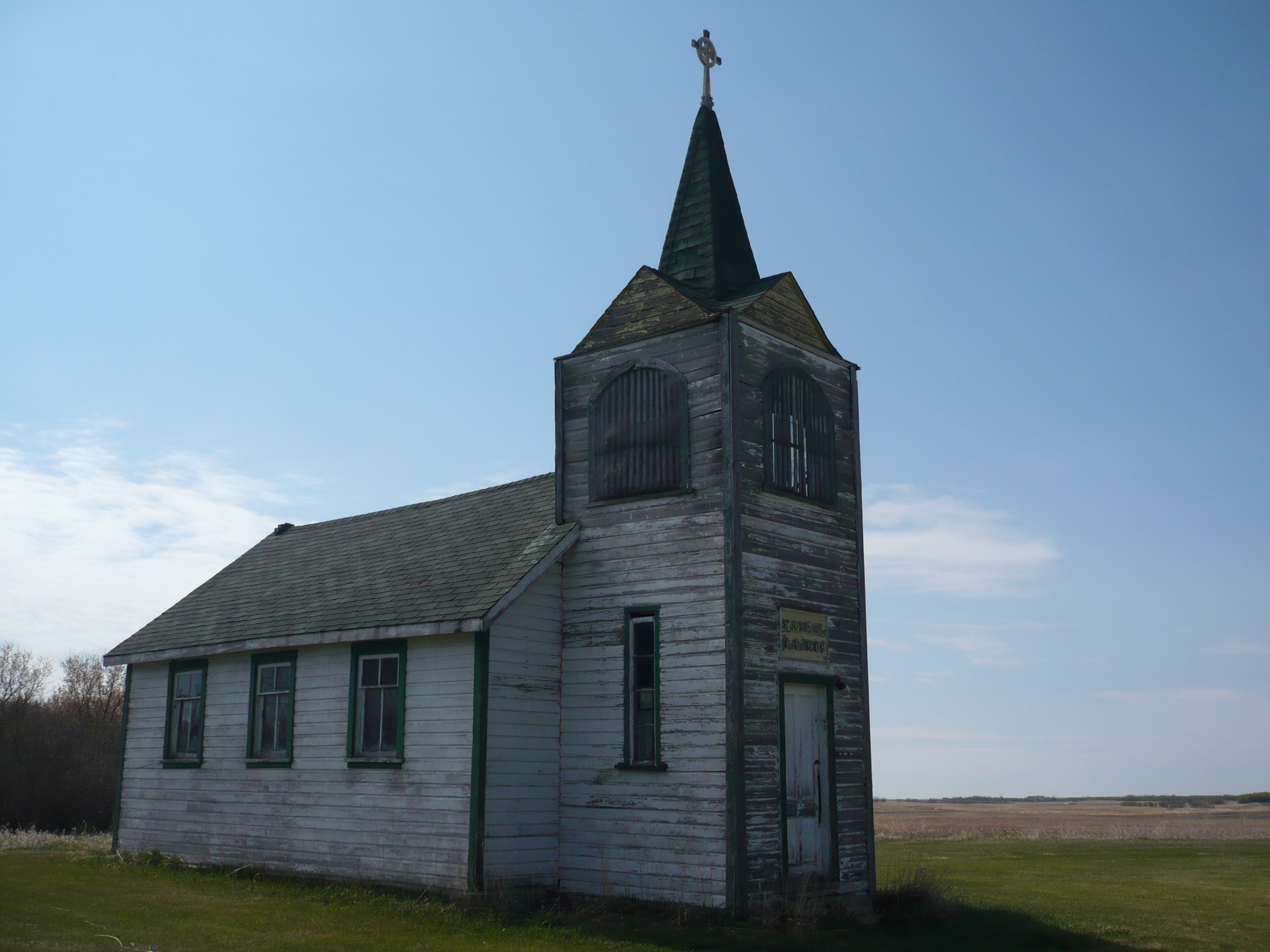
- St. John Anglican Church in Kirkella

- Location of Kirkella in Manitoba
- Coordinates: 50°01′26″N 101°21′55″W
- Country: Canada
- Province: Manitoba
- Region: Westman Region
- Census Division: No. 6
- Rural municipality: Wallace

Government
  - Governing Body: Rural Municipality of Wallace Council
  - MP: Grant Jackson
  - MLA: Greg Nesbitt
- Elevation: 500 m (1,640 ft)
- Time zone: UTC−6 (CST)
  - Summer (DST): UTC−5 (CDT)
- Postal Code: R0M 1A0
- Area code: 204
- NTS Map: 062K03
- GNBC Code: GANNZ

Kirkella is an unincorporated hamlet in southwestern Manitoba, Canada. The community was founded on the main line of the Canadian Pacific Railway in 1898. Kirkella was the name of the farm of local pioneer Thomas Watson, which in turn derived its name from Kirk Ella, a village in the East Riding of Yorkshire, England.

It is located in the Rural Municipality of Wallace, approximately 103 kilometers (64 miles) west of Brandon.
