= Fort Ellice =

Human settlement in Manitoba, Canada

- in Rupert's Land near the junction of the Assiniboine and Qu'Appelle rivers; Rural Municipality of Ellice, Manitoba, Canada

Site information
- Type: trading post
- Controlled by: Hudson's Bay Company

Location
- Coordinates: 50.40992°N 101.28721°W

Site history
- Built: 1831

Fort Ellice was a Hudson's Bay Company trading post that operated from 1794 to 1892. It was first established in February 1794 by John Sutherland on the Qu'Appelle River about 20 kilometres (12 mi) upstream from its mouth at the Assiniboine River, and known as the Qu'Appelle River Post until it was destroyed by the North West Company in 1816.

The post was rebuilt in 1817 on the south bank of the Assiniboine River near Beaver Creek, hence the post was called Beaver Creek until 1824 when it closed. In 1831, the post was reopened under the name Fort Ellice, named after Edward Ellice, a British merchant and an investor in the Hudson's Bay Company. Fort Ellice in turn gave its name to the Rural Municipality of Ellice in west-central Manitoba and to Ellice Avenue, a major arterial road in Winnipeg.

It was an important fort, as it was a major stopping point on the Carlton Trail, which ran from the Red River Colony to Fort Edmonton. (The section leading from Upper Fort Garry to this district was commonly known as the Fort Ellice Trail.)

A second more elaborate structure was built in 1862 by the HBC, and in 1873, replaced Fort Pelly as the headquarters for the Swan River District. But its economic life was short-lived as the Company relinquished control of Rupert's Land with the 1870 Deed of Surrender. This deed transferred many HBC rights to the new Canadian national government.

The fort had one more important role to play in history; it acted as a staging point for part of the North-West Mounted Police (NWMP) force that started at Fort Dufferin and headed west in 1874 to establish law and order in the future provinces of Alberta and Saskatchewan. The fort acted as an NWMP post beginning in 1875.

In 1890, the Hudson's Bay Company sold the property to Thomas V. Wheeler, who conducted private business there until 1892.

The property where both forts were located is currently owned and managed by the Nature Conservancy of Canada.
