= St. Lazare, Manitoba =

St. Lazare Saint-Lazare
- Unincorporated community
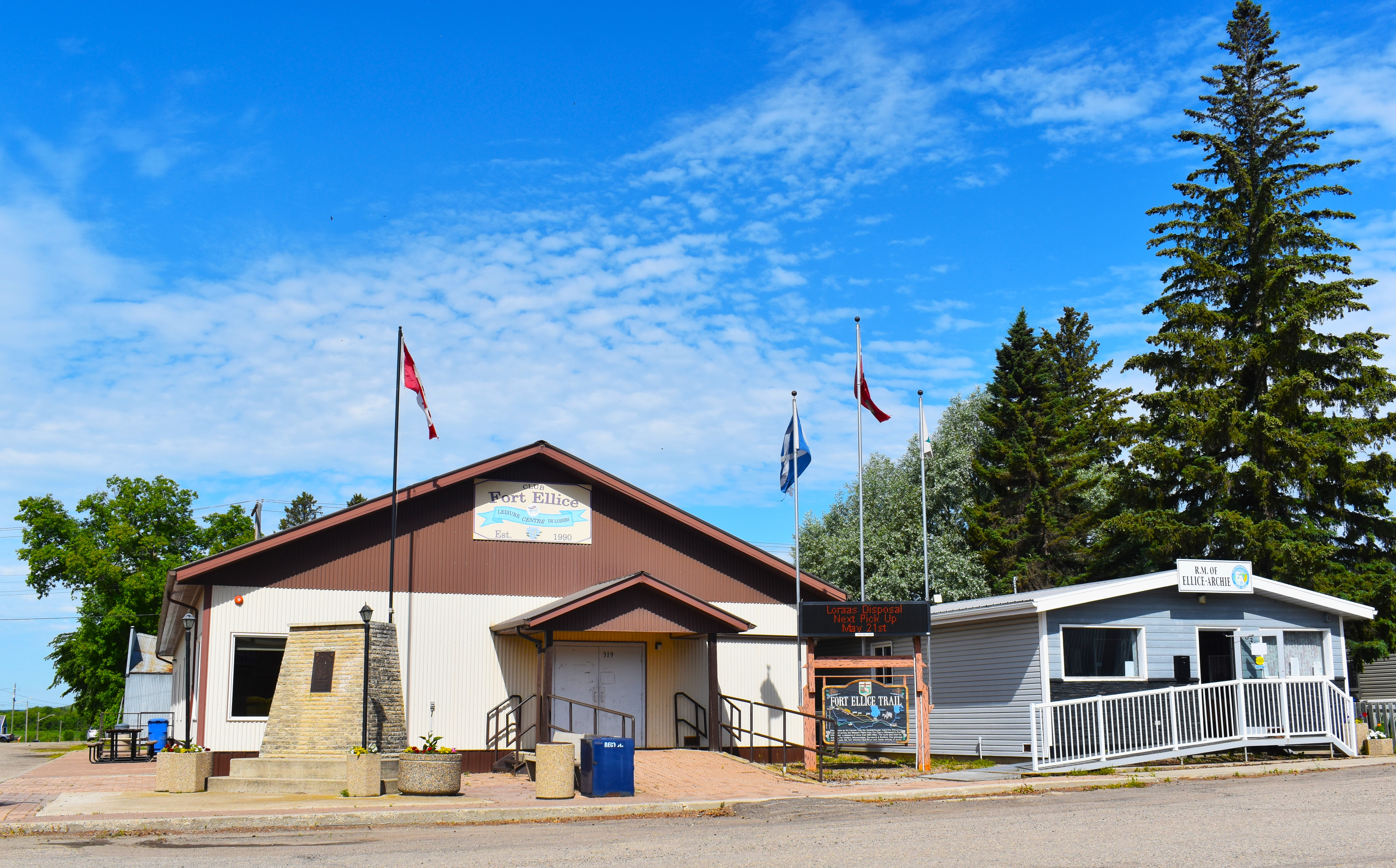
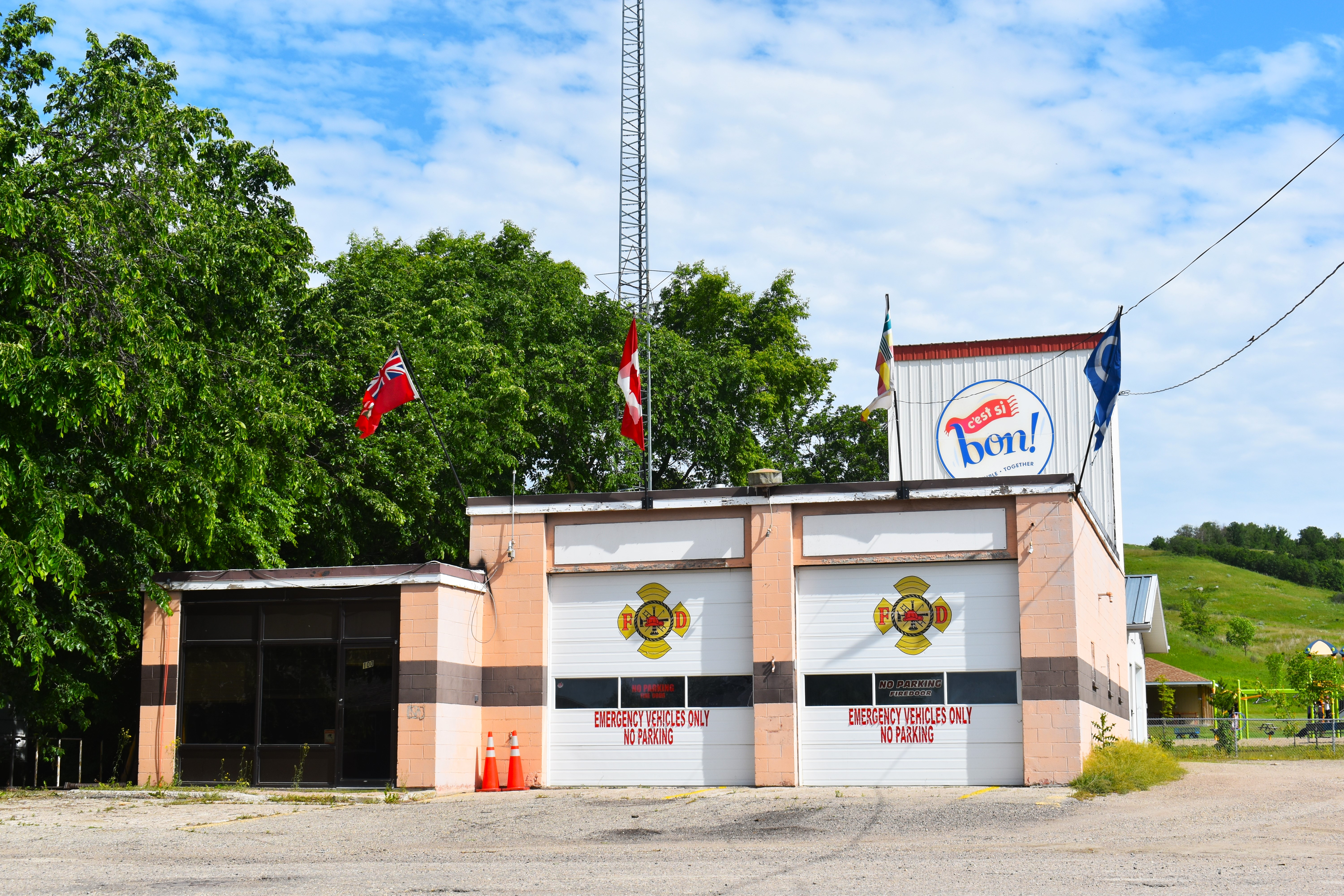
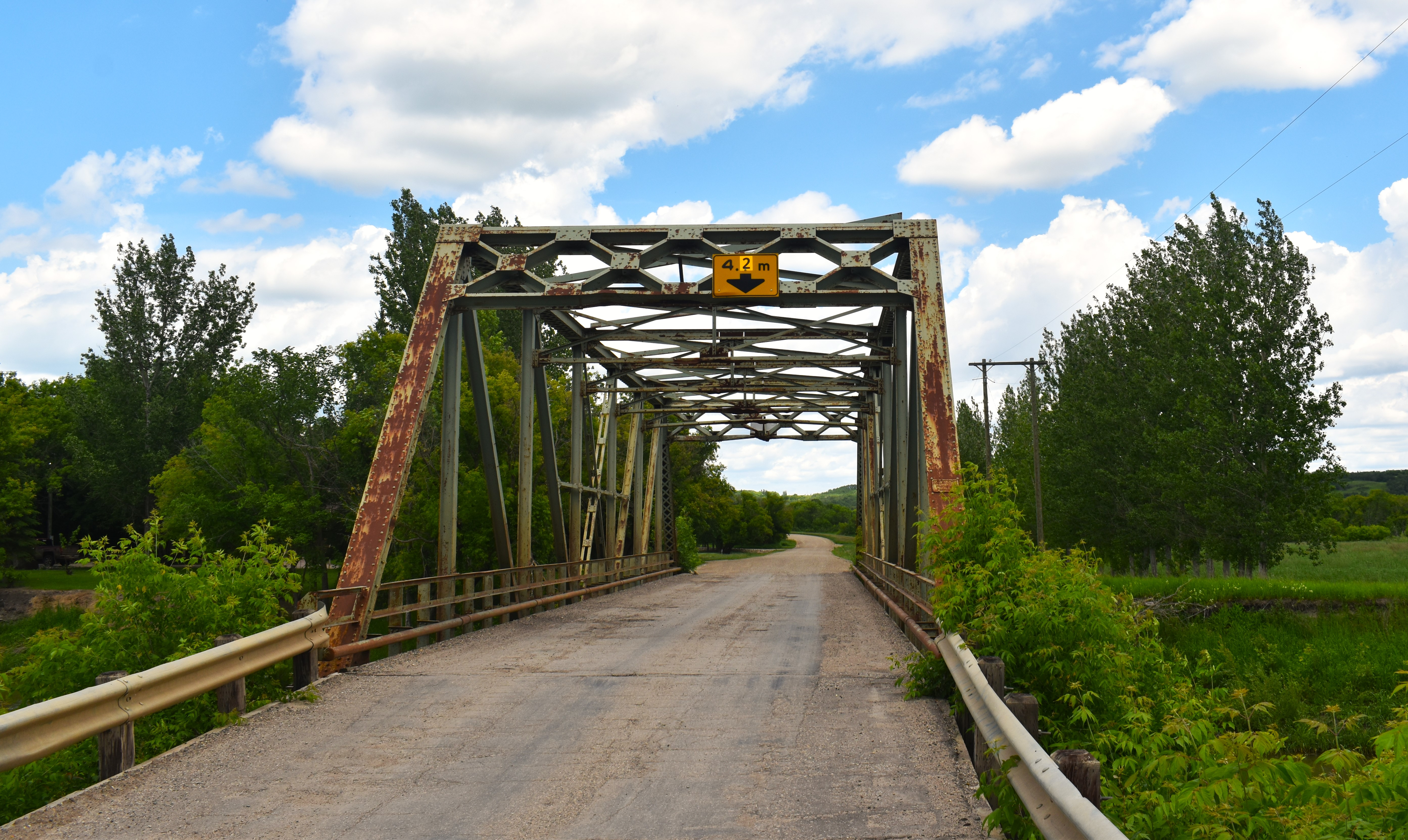
- Municipal buildings in St. Lazare. The fire station in St. Lazare. Steel truss bridge over the Qu'appelle River west of St. Lazare.

- Location within Manitoba
- Coordinates: 50°26′56″N 101°18′15″W
- Country: Canada
- Province: Manitoba
- Region: Westman Region

Area
  - Total: 2.91 km^{2} (1.12 sq mi)
- Elevation: 404 m (1,325 ft)

Population (2016)
  - Total: 257
  - Density: 88.3/km^{2} (229/sq mi)
- Time zone: UTC-6
  - Summer (DST): UTC-5
- Postal Code: R0M 1Y0
- Area codes: 204, 431
- ISO 3166 code: CA

St. Lazare is an unincorporated community recognised as a local urban district in the Rural Municipality of Ellice – Archie within the Canadian province of Manitoba that held village status prior to January 1, 2015.

The site of Saint-Lazare sits 4 kilometres north of the historical site of Fort Ellice, a Hudson's Bay Company trading post and later North-West Mounted Police headquarters. The local community is heavily influenced by this history of confluent French, English, Indian, and Métis cultures.

St. Lazare sits on the valley floor at the confluence of the Assiniboine and Qu'Appelle Rivers. It is on the east bank of the Assiniboine, and because of its position in the valley between the rivers, it is susceptible to flooding. The last major flood was in 2011. During that flood, access to most of the village was cut off. After the flood, the dykes around the village were raised to three feet above the 2011 high water mark to guard against future flooding.

== Demographics ==
In the 2021 Census of Population conducted by Statistics Canada, St-Lazare had a population of 233 living in 100 of its 104 total private dwellings, a change of −9.3% from its 2016 population of 257. With a land area of 2.73 km^{2} (1.05 sq mi), it had a population density of 85.3/km^{2} (221.1/sq mi) in 2021.

== Media ==
CKSB-2 860 AM first went on the air as a rebroadcast transmitter on March 12, 1969.

== See also ==
- List of villages in Manitoba
- List of communities in Manitoba
