= Rural Municipality of Wallace-Woodworth =

Rural municipality in Manitoba, Canada

Wallace-Woodworth
- Rural municipality
- Rural Municipality of Wallace-Woodworth
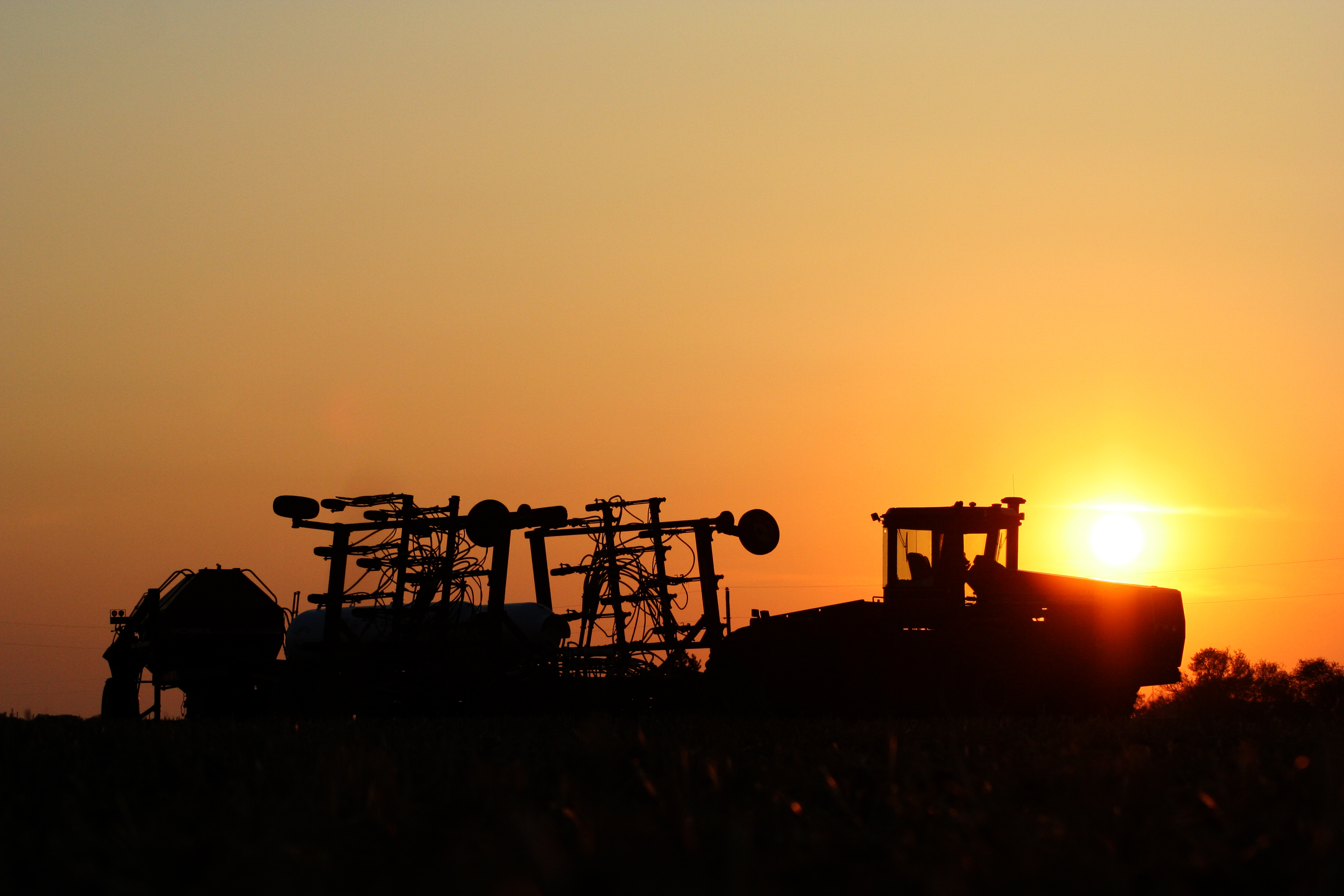

- Location of the RM of Wallace – Woodworth in Manitoba
- Coordinates: 49°54′56″N 100°56′20″W
- Country: Canada
- Province: Manitoba
- Region: Westman
- Incorporated (amalgamated): January 1, 2015

Area
  - Total: 1,977.43 km^{2} (763.49 sq mi)

Population (2021)
  - Total: 2,748
  - Density: 1.390/km^{2} (3.599/sq mi)
- Time zone: UTC-6 (CST)
  - Summer (DST): UTC-5 (CDT)
- Website: www.wallace-woodworth.com

The Rural Municipality of Wallace-Woodworth is a rural municipality (RM) in the Canadian province of Manitoba that incorporated on January 1, 2015, via the amalgamation of the RMs of Wallace and Woodworth and the village of Elkhorn. It was formed as a requirement of The Municipal Amalgamations Act, which required that municipalities with a population less than 1,000 amalgamate with one or more neighbouring municipalities by 2015. The Government of Manitoba initiated these amalgamations in order for municipalities to meet the 1997 minimum population requirement of 1,000 to incorporate a municipality.

== Demographics ==
In the 2021 Census of Population conducted by Statistics Canada, Wallace-Woodworth had a population of 2,748 living in 1,036 of its 1,144 total private dwellings, a change of −6.8% from its 2016 population of 2,948. With a land area of 1,977.43 km^{2} (763.49 sq mi), it had a population density of 1.4/km^{2} (3.6/sq mi) in 2021.
