= Elkhorn, Manitoba =

Elkhorn
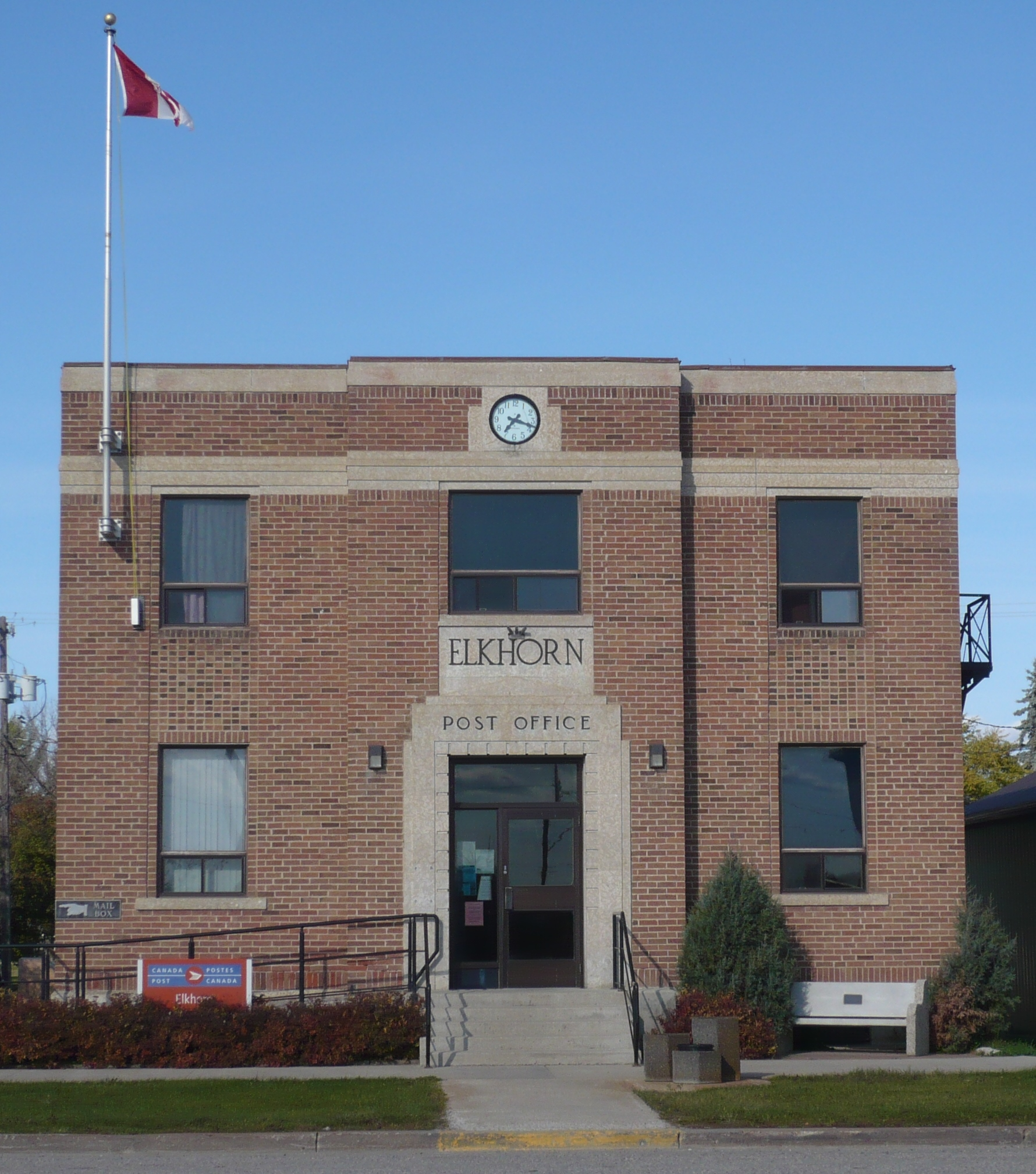
- Elkhorn Post Office

- Location of Elkhorn in Manitoba
- Coordinates: 49°58′32″N 101°14′22″W
- Country: Canada
- Province: Manitoba
- Region: Westman Region
- Census Division: No. 6
- Established,: 1882
- Incorporated: 1906
- Amalgamated: January 1, 2015

Government
  - MP: Grant Jackson
  - MLA: Greg Nesbitt

Area
  - Total: 2.73 km^{2} (1.05 sq mi)
- Elevation: 500 m (1,640 ft)

Population (2006 Census)
  - Total: 461
  - Density: 168.9/km^{2} (437/sq mi)
- Time zone: UTC−6 (CST)
  - Summer (DST): UTC−5 (CDT)
- Postal Code: R0M 0N0
- Area code: 204
- Demonym: Elkhornite
- NTS Map: 062F14
- GNBC Code: GAHPW
- Website: Former Village of Elkhorn

Elkhorn is an unincorporated community recognized as a local urban district in the Rural Municipality of Wallace – Woodworth within the Canadian province of Manitoba that held village status prior to January 1, 2015. It was originally incorporated as a village on January 2, 1906. Elkhorn is located approximately 105 kilometres (65 mi) west of Brandon.

== History ==
The community was first settled when the Canadian Pacific Railway arrived in 1882. In the CPR survey Elkhorn is located at mile sixty-four west of Brandon, in what was known as the Broadview subdivision. The Post Office Department appointed John McLeod, one of the district's first settlers, to be the community's first post master and the post office opened December 1, 1883. A board of trade was organized in April 1899 and lobbied for further settlement in the community and surrounding municipality, better infrastructure, and improvement of commerce. It was responsible for the establishment of the first fire brigade in 1901, which became the responsibility of the Village of Elkhorn when it incorporated in 1906. In 1948 the board was reorganized and renamed the Elkhorn and District Chamber of Commerce.

== Demographics ==
Historical population

Year	Pop.	±%
1906	525	—
1911	574	+9.3%
1916	538	−6.3%
1921	534	−0.7%
1926	549	+2.8%
1931	543	−1.1%
1936	535	−1.5%
1941	557	+4.1%
1946	592	+6.3%
1951	635	+7.3%
1956	673	+6.0%
1961	666	−1.0%

Year	Pop.	±%
1966	575	−13.7%
1971	569	−1.0%
1976	527	−7.4%
1981	509	−3.4%
1986	534	+4.9%
1991	505	−5.4%
1996	514	+1.8%
2001	470	−8.6%
2006	461	−1.9%
2011	471	+2.2%
2016	479	+1.7%
2021	455	−5.0%

In the 2021 Census of Population conducted by Statistics Canada, Elkhorn had a population of 455 living in 205 of its 229 total private dwellings, a change of −5% from its 2016 population of 479. With a land area of 2.76 km^{2} (1.07 sq mi), it had a population density of 164.9/km^{2} (427.0/sq mi) in 2021.

== Education ==
The first settlers in the district came from well established communities in Eastern Canada or Britain and quickly recognized the necessity of public education. The community opened the first school February 5, 1885 as School District 366. The population rapidly outgrew the facility and the community sold it in 1892. The building still stands as a private residence. A larger school built of field stone was completed in 1895 and all subsequent schools have been built on the same grounds.

The growing population continued to require more space and an even larger brick school was built in 1910. Eventually even this new school had to split its auditorium into two classrooms and create a third additional room in the basement. Only elementary school was taught in the building after a collegiate was opened in 1959. Elkhorn School District 366 was absorbed into the Fort La Bosse School Division November 10, 1971. The institution again changed appearance in 1976 when the brick school was demolished and a new elementary wing and gymnasium were added to the collegiate.

Today the school is home to approximately 170 students from Kindergarten to Grade 12.

== Manitoba Antique Automobile Museum ==
The Manitoba Antique Automobile Museum was Established to house an Impressive private Collection of Antique Car in Manitoba. It now houses A wide Variety of Artifacts and Documents That are integral to history of the Community, As well as an Array of early Farm machinery's and implement.

The museum owes its existence to the tireless efforts of a local farmer, Isaac Clarkson. In 1946 he purchased and restored a 1909 Hupmobile that he had been fascinated with in his youth. He continued to acquire and restore vehicles at his farm for the next several years. Abhorring the idea that the collection should be split up or leave the province Clarkson and other prominent members of the community successfully petitioned the Manitoba Government to establish a museum foundation. March 30, 1961 The Manitoba Antique Automobile Museum Foundation was established by an act of the provincial legislature. Mr. Clarkson donated his entire collection to the foundation, which at the time numbered some 65 vehicles, 40 of which had been completely restored. The estimated value of the collection in 1961 was $75,000 - $100,000. The community made plans to erect a museum building as a centennial project in October 1964. Contractors completed the building by August 1965 and it was opened to the public in the summer of 1966. The museum was officially opened on the national centennial, July 1, 1967.

The museum is located along the south side of the Trans-Canada Highway and serves as Elkhorn's primary tourist attraction. It is open daily from May to September.

== Climate ==
Climate data for Elkhorn
Month	Jan	Feb	Mar	Apr	May	Jun	Jul	Aug	Sep	Oct	Nov	Dec	Year
Record high °C (°F)	8.5 (47.3)	9.5 (49.1)	21.0 (69.8)	31.5 (88.7)	35.0 (95.0)	35.5 (95.9)	35.0 (95.0)	39.0 (102.2)	34.0 (93.2)	33.5 (92.3)	24.5 (76.1)	11.0 (51.8)	39.0 (102.2)
Mean daily maximum °C (°F)	−10.1 (13.8)	−7.0 (19.4)	−0.8 (30.6)	10.2 (50.4)	18.0 (64.4)	22.2 (72.0)	25.3 (77.5)	25.2 (77.4)	19.7 (67.5)	10.6 (51.1)	−0.1 (31.8)	−7.2 (19.0)	8.8 (47.8)
Daily mean °C (°F)	−15.2 (4.6)	−12.1 (10.2)	−5.7 (21.7)	4.1 (39.4)	11.1 (52.0)	16.0 (60.8)	18.9 (66.0)	17.9 (64.2)	12.6 (54.7)	4.6 (40.3)	−4.8 (23.4)	−11.9 (10.6)	3.0 (37.4)
Mean daily minimum °C (°F)	−20.2 (−4.4)	−17.1 (1.2)	−10.5 (13.1)	−2.1 (28.2)	4.3 (39.7)	9.7 (49.5)	12.3 (54.1)	10.6 (51.1)	5.4 (41.7)	−1.4 (29.5)	−9.4 (15.1)	−16.4 (2.5)	−2.9 (26.8)
Record low °C (°F)	−40.5 (−40.9)	−41.0 (−41.8)	−37.0 (−34.6)	−21.0 (−5.8)	−10.0 (14.0)	−1.0 (30.2)	2.5 (36.5)	−1.0 (30.2)	−6.5 (20.3)	−20.5 (−4.9)	−29.5 (−21.1)	−40.0 (−40.0)	−41.0 (−41.8)
Average precipitation mm (inches)	25.6 (1.01)	15.6 (0.61)	31.6 (1.24)	27.6 (1.09)	66.8 (2.63)	102.3 (4.03)	67.9 (2.67)	52.2 (2.06)	35.2 (1.39)	26.8 (1.06)	25.9 (1.02)	26.1 (1.03)	503.5 (19.82)
Average rainfall mm (inches)	0.8 (0.03)	0.9 (0.04)	8.8 (0.35)	15.1 (0.59)	61.3 (2.41)	102.3 (4.03)	67.9 (2.67)	52.2 (2.06)	34.9 (1.37)	18.9 (0.74)	4.9 (0.19)	0.7 (0.03)	368.5 (14.51)
Average snowfall cm (inches)	24.9 (9.8)	14.7 (5.8)	22.8 (9.0)	12.5 (4.9)	5.5 (2.2)	0.0 (0.0)	0.0 (0.0)	0.0 (0.0)	0.3 (0.1)	7.9 (3.1)	21.0 (8.3)	25.4 (10.0)	135.0 (53.1)
Source: Environment Canada

== Government ==
Elkhorn is a former village now administered by the Rural Municipality of Wallace – Woodworth.

=== Provincial representation ===
Elkhorn is represented by Greg Nesbitt in the Legislative Assembly of Manitoba as part of the constituency of Riding Mountain.

The constituency was represented by Larry Maguire from 1999 until his resignation on October 18, 2013 to seek the Conservative Party of Canada nomination for the federal constituency of Brandon-Souris. Kevin Tutthill, a former councillor and deputy mayor of the former Village of Elkhorn, sought the Progressive Conservative nomination to replace Maguire, but was defeated by insurance broker Doyle Piwniuk of Virden. On January 28, 2014 Piwniuk won the Arthur-Virden by-election and served as critic for multiculturalism and literacy.

Elkhorn formed all of Voting Area 10 in the 2014 Arthur-Virden by-election with a total of 348 registered voters.

2014 Arthur-Virden By-Election Results - Voting Area 10
Political Party	Candidate	Votes	Percentage
Progressive Conservative	Doyle Piwniuk	60	63.16%
Liberal	Floyd Buhler	18	18.95%
New Democratic	Bob Senff	12	12.63%
Green	Kate Storey	5	5.26%
Total valid votes		95	100.00%
Electors on the lists		348	
Turnout		95	27.30%

=== Federal representation ===
Elkhorn is represented in the Canadian Parliament as part of the riding of Brandon-Souris. The current Member of Parliament is Grant Jackson, whom the constituents first elected in 2025.

In the 2011 federal election, the community had 309 registered voters of which 184 cast ballots. At 59.55%, voter turnout was slightly higher than the constituency level of 57.54%, but lower than the national level of 61.1%.

2011 Canada Election Results - Brandon-Souris - Polling Station 6
Candidate	Political Party	Votes	Percentage
Merv Tweed	Conservative	140	76.09%
John Bouché	New Democratic Party	30	16.30%
Wes Penner	Liberal	11	5.98%
Dave Barnes	Green	3	1.63%

== Media ==
The first publication in Elkhorn was a handwritten news bulletin reproduced on cyclostyle. Founded by F. Greenstreet in 1886, the Elkhorn Breeze was applauded by the Manitoba Free Press as "a credit to that prosperous young city." In spite of such praise The Breeze had ceased publication by the end of 1887.

In 1892 the Elkhorn District Advocate began circulation as a standard print, weekly newspaper. This venture too ceased publication after only one year. A.E. Wilson, principal of the Washakada Industrial School, salvaged the paper and began printing the Elkhorn Advocate at the school only two months after the District Advocate released its final issue. Aboriginal students at the school printed the paper and learned the trade as part of the Residential School System designed to assimilate aboriginals into mainstream society. Management of the paper transferred to W.J. Thompson shortly after it began printing.

December 3, 1908 the first issue of the Elkhorn Mercury circulated in the community. The Mercury operated in competition with the Advocate until September, 1910 when the latter permanently ceased operation. Various owners and editors of the Mercury continued to print the paper weekly in Elkhorn until 1965, when it was absorbed by the Virden Empire-Advance. This newspaper along with the Moosomin World-Spectator are weekly publications that now provide the majority of local media coverage for the community. Currently there are no publishing or broadcasting companies in Elkhorn.

== Mayors of Elkhorn ==
Name	In Office
William M. Cushing	1906–1907
Charles R. Duxbury	1908–1909
J.S. McLeod	1910–1911
H.J. Jones	1912
J.H. Miller	1913
H.J. Jones	1914–1916
John Mooney	1917–1918
R.H. Brotherhood	1919
Charles G. Webster	1920–1921
W.J. Thompson	1922
G.T. Earle	1923–1924
W.T. Clarke	1925–1926
Walter Davey	1927–1929
H.J. Jones	1930–1935
J.M. McCorkindale	1936–1937
C.W. Johnston	1938–1947
John W.M. Thompson	1948–1953
J.W. Clarke	1954–1957
J. Norris	1958–1964
J.H. Hennan	1965–1967
Fred Simpson	1968–1969
John Canart	1970–1971
William Bartley	1972–1979
Ron Heritage	1980
R. Lund	1980–1983
Ron Heritage	1983–1986
Ken Rowan	1986–1995
Keith Orr	1995–2002
Roland Gagnon	Incumbent

== Other Notable Persons ==
Mary Carter (née Munn), one of the first female judges in Saskatchewan; part of childhood spent in Elkhorn.

Travis Sanheim, Ice Hockey player for the Philadelphia Flyers.

== Culture ==
British Columbian indie band Said the Whale make a reference to Elkhorn in Dear Elkhorn, the opening track from their 2009 album "Islands Disappear". The song's lyrics were inspired by an incident when the band's tour van broke down near the village.
