= McAuley, Manitoba =

McAuley
- Location of McAuley in Manitoba McAuley (Canada)
- Coordinates: 50°15′44″N 101°23′19″W
- Country: Canada
- Province: Manitoba
- Region: Westman Region
- Census Division: No. 15

Government
  - Governing Body: Rural Municipality of Ellice – Archie
  - MP: Dan Mazier
  - MLA: Greg Nesbitt
- Time zone: UTC−06:00 (CST)
  - Summer (DST): UTC−05:00 (CDT)
- Postal Code: R0M 1H0
- Area code: 204
- NTS Map: 062K06
- GNBC Code: GAQNJ

McAuley is a community northwest of Virden, Manitoba located in the Rural Municipality of Ellice – Archie.

The community was named after George W. McAuley who was the townsite owner. It was a railway point for the Canadian Pacific Railway. The post office was named Rutherglen until 1906, referencing a location in Scotland from where some of the settlers had emigrated.
