= Manitoba Provincial Road 255 =

Provincial road in Manitoba, Canada

Provincial Road 255
- PR 255 highlighted in red
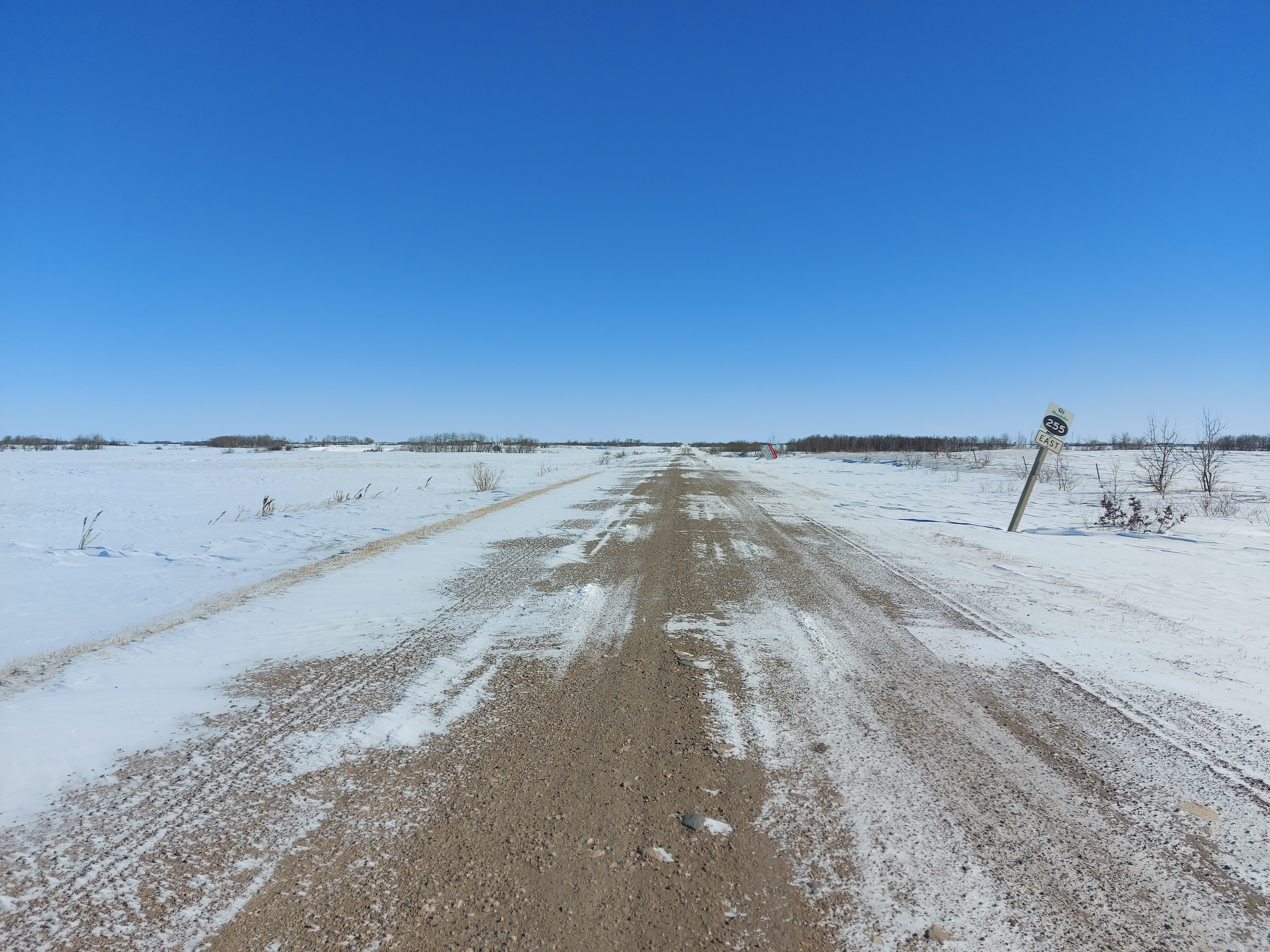
- PR 255 at its western terminus

Route information
- Maintained by Manitoba Infrastructure
- Length: 52.7 km (32.7 mi)
- Existed: 1966–present

Major junctions
- West end: Township Road 92 at the Saskatchewan border
- PR 256 near Cromer; PTH 83 at Scarth
- East end: PR 254 north of Oak Lake Beach

Location
- Country: Canada
- Province: Manitoba
- Rural municipalities: Pipestone, Sifton

Highway system
- Provincial highways in Manitoba; Winnipeg City Routes
← PR 254	→ PR 256

Provincial Road 255 (PR 255) is a provincial road in the Westman Region of the Canadian province of Manitoba. The road runs from the border with Saskatchewan west to PR 254, north of Oak Lake Beach. Communities along its route include Ebor, Cromer, Woodnorth, and Scarth. It is about 52.7 kilometres (32.7 mi) long.

== Route description ==
PR 255 begins in the Rural Municipality of Pipestone at the Saskatchewan border, with the road continuing into the Rural Municipality of Maryfield No. 91 as Township Road 92, which connects to Saskatchewan Highway 600 8.2 kilometres (5.1 mi). It heads west through the hamlet of Ebor on its way to Cromer, where it shares a very short concurrency with PR 256 as the pair cross a bridge over Pipestone Creek together. Leaving Cromer, the highway traverses a switchback as it travels along the south side of Woodnorth, where it has a junction with Road 159W (formerly PR 252). After crossing PTH 83 in the Scarth community, PR 255 enters the Rural Municipality of Sifton, traveling along the northern side of Oak Lake before coming to an end at a junction with PR 254 north of Oak Lake Beach. The entire length of PR 255 is a gravel, two-lane highway.

== Major intersections ==
Division	Location	km	mi	Destinations	Notes
Pipestone		0.0	0.0	Township Road 92 to Highway 600 – Parkman	Western terminus; continuation into Saskatchewan
Pipestone	Cromer	13.1	8.1	PR 256 south – Sinclair	Western end of PR 256 concurrency
Pipestone	Cromer	13.2	8.2	Bridge over Pipestone Creek	
Pipestone	Cromer	13.4	8.3	PR 256 north – Elkhorn	Eastern end of PR 256 concurrency
Pipestone		26.5	16.5	Road 159W – Woodnorth	Former PR 252
Pipestone	Scarth	34.7	21.6	PTH 83 – Pipestone, Virden	
Pipestone	Scarth	35.6	22.1	Railway Street – Scarth	
Sifton		52.7	32.7	PR 254 – Oak Lake, Oak Lake Beach	Eastern terminus; road continues as Road 49N
1.000 mi = 1.609 km; 1.000 km = 0.621 mi: Concurrency terminus
