= List of historic places in Westman Region, Manitoba =

This is a list of historic places in Westman Region, Manitoba entered on the Canadian Register of Historic Places, whether they are federal, provincial, or municipal.

== List of historic places ==
Name	Address	Coordinates	Government recognition (CRHP №)	Wikidata ID	Image
Alexander Post Office	415 - 2nd Avenue West; Alexander MB	49°49′47″N 100°17′46″W	Alexander municipality (2774)		Upload Photo
Frelsis (Liberty) Lutheran Church	NW 12-6-14W; Argyle MB	49°28′01″N 99°14′35″W	Manitoba (3855)		Upload Photo
Fowler Block	225 Elizabeth Avenue East; Argyle MB	49°23′07″N 99°14′34″W	Argyle municipality (4881)		Upload Photo
Thomas Poole Building	215 Elizabeth Avenue East; Argyle MB	49°23′07″N 99°14′45″W	Argyle municipality (4882)		Upload Photo
Baldur United Church	202 Second Street South; Argyle MB	49°23′14″N 99°14′41″W	Argyle municipality (5079)		
St. George's Anglican Church	Provincial Road 253; Argyle MB	49°15′08″N 99°09′15″W	Argyle municipality (5483)		Upload Photo
Reeves Barn	Whitehead MB	49°54′07″N 100°21′36″W	Whitehead municipality (8664)		Upload Photo
Napinka School	Souris Street; Brenda MB	49°19′17″N 100°50′35″W	Brenda municipality (6617)		Upload Photo
Cromer United Church	1st Street W and 1st Avenue; Cromer MB	49°43′51″N 101°14′13″W	Cromer municipality (4827)		
Amos Blacksmith Shop	101 Second Street; Waskada MB	49°05′50″N 100°48′07″W	Waskada municipality (8052)		Upload Photo
Elton Heritage House	Justice Road; Elton MB	49°58′26″N 99°59′10″W	Elton municipality (2772)		Upload Photo
Ontario Gothic House	North of hamlet of Forrest; Elton MB	49°57′59″N 99°56′07″W	Elton municipality (20249)		Upload Photo
McGregor House	Daly MB	49°53′47″N 100°06′47″W	Daly municipality (5011)		Upload Photo
Elgin Canadian Imperial Bank of Commerce Building	131 Main Street; Whitewater MB	49°26′39″N 100°16′16″W	Whitewater municipality (5055)		Upload Photo
Anderson Barn	Elton MB	49°56′23″N 99°54′13″W	Elton municipality (5084)		Upload Photo
St. George's Anglican Church	Turtle Mountain MB	49°08′07″N 99°29′10″W	Turtle Mountain municipality (5333)		Upload Photo
Holmfield Swimming Hole	Between Railway Avenue and the Long River in Holmfield; Turtle Mountain MB	49°08′16″N 99°29′19″W	Turtle Mountain municipality (19379)		Upload Photo
Holmfield Centennial Hall	Gordon Avenue, Holmfield; Turtle Mountain MB	49°08′08″N 99°29′14″W	Turtle Mountain municipality (19380)		Upload Photo
Hilton United Church	2nd Street; Strathcona MB	49°30′21″N 99°31′26″W	Strathcona municipality (5479)		Upload Photo
Bank of Toronto Vault	Turtle Mountain MB	49°08′23″N 99°29′04″W	Turtle Mountain municipality (6755)		Upload Photo
Ninga Presbyterian Church	Glengarry Street and Glenco Avenue; Turtle Mountain MB	49°13′35″N 99°53′16″W	Turtle Mountain municipality (6901)		Upload Photo
Riverside Park	Whitewater MB	49°30′04″N 99°59′32″W	Whitewater municipality (8049)		Upload Photo
St. Nicholas Ukrainian Catholic Church	Harrison MB	50°28′04″N 100°05′42″W	Harrison municipality (4830)		Upload Photo
Sts. Peter and Paul Ukrainian Orthodox Church	Provincial Route 566 east of Olha; Park (South) MB	50°40′58″N 100°29′06″W	Park (South) municipality (4830)		Upload Photo
Bethlehem Lutheran Church Manse	Queen Elizabeth Road; Erickson MB	50°30′13″N 99°54′46″W	Erickson municipality (6596)		Upload Photo
Chastko House	Harrison MB	50°29′33″N 100°05′31″W	Harrison municipality (8227)		Upload Photo
Graham Barn	Whitewater MB	49°22′44″N 100°02′28″W	Whitewater municipality (3910)		Upload Photo
Riverside School	Whitewater MB	49°28′13″N 99°59′24″W	Whitewater municipality (4831)		Upload Photo
Knox Bellafield Presbyterian Church	Riverside MB	49°21′24″N 99°40′35″W	Riverside municipality (5010)		Upload Photo
Old English Church	602 River Avenue; Hartney MB	49°28′47″N 100°31′08″W	Hartney municipality (16351)		Upload Photo
Yerex House	SE 1/4 21-15-16 WPM; Rosedale MB	50°17′25″N 99°36′23″W	Rosedale municipality (2765)		Upload Photo
Eunola School	SE 11-4-29 WPM; Edward MB	49°16′56″N 101°16′48″W	Edward municipality (5787)		Upload Photo
Coultervale School	Arthur MB	49°01′47″N 101°01′34″W	Arthur municipality (5991)		Upload Photo
Verona School	Arthur MB	49°07′58″N 100°53′17″W	Arthur municipality (5992)		Upload Photo
Strathclair Museum	33 Main Street; Strathclair MB	50°24′05″N 100°23′35″W	Strathclair municipality (4108)		Upload Photo
St. John the Baptist Ukrainian Catholic Church	NW 2-19-22 WPM; Strathclair MB	50°36′09″N 100°25′59″W	Manitoba (4603)		Upload Photo
Ukrainian Greek Orthodox Church of the Holy Transfiguration	Strathclair MB	50°33′00″N 100°27′36″W	Strathclair municipality (6936)		Upload Photo
Strathclair Agricultural Society Bandstand	Strathclair MB	50°24′05″N 100°23′35″W	Strathclair municipality (14522)		Upload Photo
Breadalbane Presbyterian Church	Woodworth MB	49°54′59″N 100°46′54″W	Woodworth municipality (10366)		Upload Photo
Carpentier House	Woodworth MB	49°48′22″N 100°32′56″W	Woodworth municipality (5122)		Upload Photo
Leander Lawlor House	Earl Street, Kenton; Woodworth MB	49°59′13″N 100°36′57″W	Woodworth municipality (20248)		Upload Photo
St. Alban's Anglican Church	174 Assiniboine Street West; Oak Lake MB	49°46′02″N 100°37′19″W	Oak Lake municipality (5080)		
Leitch House	44 Fourth Avenue; Oak Lake MB	49°45′49″N 100°37′44″W	Oak Lake municipality (5372)		Upload Photo
Kola Anglican Church of the Advent	Wallace MB	49°50′23″N 101°16′52″W	Wallace municipality (5361)		
Frame House	390 King Street; Virden MB	49°50′43″N 100°55′55″W	Virden municipality (5396)		
Scarth Block	408 7th Avenue South; Virden MB	49°51′01″N 100°55′52″W	Virden municipality (20252)		Upload Photo
Virden Canadian Pacific Railway Station	425-6th Avenue South; Virden MB	49°50′53″N 100°55′37″W	Federal (6499), Manitoba (5397)		Upload Photo
Virden Municipal Building and Auditorium	228 Wellington Street; Virden MB	49°50′56″N 100°56′02″W	Manitoba (5401)		More images
Elkhorn United Church	102 Foxford Avenue East; Elkhorn MB	49°58′42″N 101°14′17″W	Elkhorn municipality (4899)		Upload Photo
Forder Barn	Rural setting west of Pipestone; Pipestone MB		Pipestone municipality (20247)		Upload Photo
Pipestone Municipal Building	401 - 3rd Avenue; Pipestone MB	49°33′33″N 101°05′38″W	Manitoba (5112)		Upload Photo
Mutter House	116 2nd Avenue; Pipestone MB	49°33′29″N 101°05′53″W	Pipestone municipality (2724)		Upload Photo
Reston Canadian Pacific Railway Engine House	Pipestone MB	49°33′17″N 101°05′49″W	Pipestone municipality (5793)		Upload Photo
Berry House	408 First Avenue; Pipestone MB	49°33′30″N 101°05′42″W	Pipestone municipality (8228)		Upload Photo
Stott Site	Brandon MB	49°31′N 100°03′W	Manitoba (7293)		Upload Photo
Millford Cemetery	Glenboro MB	49°37′12″N 99°33′51″W	Glenboro municipality (7662)		Upload Photo
Camp Hughes Military Training Site	Carberry MB	49°52′58″N 99°33′01″W	Federal (18924), Manitoba (7745)		
Armoury	1116 Victoria Avenue; Brandon MB	49°50′32″N 99°57′12″W	Federal (9615)		Upload Photo
Canadian Pacific Railway Station	1000 Pacific Avenue (at 10th St.); Brandon MB	49°50′59″N 99°57′05″W	Federal (4558), Manitoba (19365)		
Federal Building	1039 Princess Avenue; Brandon MB	49°50′49″N 99°57′09″W	Federal (4793)		Upload Photo
First Baptist Church	1037 Lorne Avenue; Brandon MB	49°50′43″N 99°57′08″W	Brandon municipality (19932)		
Fraser Block	1031 Rosser Avenue; Brandon MB	49°50′55″N 99°57′06″W	Brandon municipality (2968)		More images
Jackson House	339 Victoria Avenue; Brandon MB	49°50′32″N 99°56′34″W	Brandon municipality (19933)		Upload Photo
Maley House	1605 Victoria Avenue; Brandon MB	49°50′35″N 99°57′16″W	Brandon municipality (3220)		More images
LaPlont Block	924 Rosser Avenue; Brandon MB	49°50′55″N 99°57′17″W	Brandon municipality (3329)		More images
Brandon Central Fire Station	637 Princess Avenue; Brandon MB	49°51′N 99°57′W	Brandon municipality (3336)		More images
Zink's Grocery Store	361 1st Street; Brandon MB	49°50′N 99°56′W	Brandon municipality (3382)		Upload Photo
Stone Fence	17th Street between Rosser and Princess Avenue, Princess Avenue between 17th and 18th Streets; Brandon MB	49°50′34″N 99°56′56″W	Brandon municipality (3400)		More images
Shillinglaw House	302 Russell Street; Brandon MB	49°50′N 99°56′W	Brandon municipality (3427)		Upload Photo
A.E. McKenzie Co. Building	30-9th Street; Brandon MB	49°50′55″N 99°57′01″W	Manitoba (3487)		More images
Merchants Bank Building	1043 Rosser Avenue; Brandon MB	49°51′N 99°57′W	Manitoba (3495)		More images
Johnson House	446 7th Street; Brandon MB	49°50′34″N 99°57′01″W	Brandon municipality (3911)		More images
St. Matthew's Anglican Cathedral	403 13th Street; Brandon MB	49°50′38″N 99°57′16″W	Manitoba (3918)		More images
Yates House	431 16th Street; Brandon MB	49°50′35″N 99°57′32″W	Brandon municipality (4872)		More images
Christie House	404 13th Street, Brandon; Brandon MB	49°50′42″N 99°57′21″W	Brandon municipality (4912)		More images
Burchill and Howey Block	908 Rosser Avenue; Brandon MB	49°50′51″N 99°57′27″W	Brandon municipality (4925)		More images
Villa Louise	707 Louise Avenue; Brandon MB	49°50′38″N 99°57′11″W	Manitoba (5067)		More images
Brandon Mental Health Centre Nurses' Residence	Brandon MB	49°52′07″N 99°56′15″W	Manitoba (5301)		More images
Lorne Terrace	1133-37 Lorne Avenue; Brandon MB	49°50′43″N 99°56′18″W	Brandon municipality (5303)		More images
Johnston Estate	547 13th Street; Brandon MB	49°50′29″N 99°57′17″W	Brandon municipality (5331)		Upload Photo
Brandon Normal School	1129 Queens Avenue; Brandon MB	49°49′47″N 99°57′10″W	Manitoba (5357)		Upload Photo
Dominion Exhibition Display Building II National Historic Site of Canada	Provincial Exhibition Grounds; Brandon MB	49°49′53″N 99°57′31″W	Federal (7411), Manitoba (21063)		
BCATP Hangar No. 1 National Historic Site of Canada	Brandon Municipal Airport; Brandon MB	49°54′35″N 99°57′03″W	Federal (7753), Manitoba (7333), Brandon municipality (3351)		More images
Brandon Court House and Jail	525 Victoria Avenue East; Brandon MB	49°50′36″N 99°55′56″W	Manitoba (8121)		Upload Photo
Paterson-Matheson House	1039 Louise Avenue; Brandon MB	49°50′38″N 99°56′56″W	Manitoba (8124)		More images
B.J. Hales House	1312 10th Street; Brandon MB	49°50′22″N 99°56′11″W	Brandon municipality (8847)		Upload Photo
McKenzie House	436 Victoria Avenue; Brandon MB	49°50′37″N 99°58′35″W	Brandon municipality (3210)		Upload Photo
Daly House	122 18th Street; Brandon MB	49°51′N 99°58′W	Brandon municipality (3353)		More images
Brandon College and Clark Hall Buildings	270 - 18th Street; Brandon MB	49°50′49″N 99°57′43″W	Manitoba (3881)		More images
Brandon Citizens' Science Building	270-18th Street; Brandon MB	49°50′35″N 99°57′47″W	Manitoba (3882)		More images
Carberry Agricultural Society Display Building	Carberry Fairgrounds; Carberry MB	49°52′05″N 99°21′34″W	Manitoba (4873)		Upload Photo
A.E. Gardiner Building	116 Main Street; Carberry MB	49°52′05″N 99°21′34″W	Carberry municipality (5392)		Upload Photo
Nelson Butt Building	31 Main Street; Carberry MB	49°44′34″N 99°21′05″W	Carberry municipality (9859)		Upload Photo
Carberry News Express Building	34 Main Street; Carberry MB	49°44′34″N 99°21′05″W	Carberry municipality (9864)		Upload Photo
Old Bank of Montreal	33 Main Street; Carberry MB	49°44′34″N 99°21′05″W	Carberry municipality (9887)		Upload Photo
Historic Downtown Carberry	316 Fourth Avenue; 9 - 145 Main Street; Carberry MB	49°52′11″N 99°21′39″W	Carberry municipality (9891)		Upload Photo
Nelson Hotel	9 Main Street; Carberry MB	49°52′11″N 99°21′19″W	Carberry municipality (10330)		Upload Photo
Switzer's Red and White Store	39 Main Street; Carberry MB	49°52′11″N 99°21′19″W	Carberry municipality (10331)		Upload Photo
The Style Shop	41 Main Street; Carberry MB	49°52′11″N 99°21′19″W	Carberry municipality (10332)		Upload Photo
Ray's Diner	43 Main Street; Carberry MB	49°52′11″N 99°21′19″W	Carberry municipality (10333)		Upload Photo
Pharmacy Building	44 Main Street; Carberry MB	49°52′02″N 99°21′33″W	Carberry municipality (10447)		Upload Photo
Old Town Hall	122 Main Street; Carberry MB	49°52′05″N 99°21′33″W	Carberry municipality (9463)		Upload Photo
Calvary Pentecostal Church	141 Main Street; Carberry MB	49°52′11″N 99°21′19″W	Carberry municipality (10343)		Upload Photo
Former Rex Cafe Site	50 Main Street; Carberry MB	49°52′11″N 99°21′19″W	Carberry municipality (10346)		Upload Photo
Manitoba Telephone System Building	121 Main Street; Carberry MB	49°52′11″N 99°21′19″W	Carberry municipality (10348)		Upload Photo
White House	510 Fourth Avenue; Carberry MB	49°51′58″N 99°21′40″W	Carberry municipality (5784)		Upload Photo
Kowalchuk Building	38 Main Street; Carberry MB	49°52′11″N 99°21′19″W	Carberry municipality (10433)		Upload Photo
Forbes Building	40 Main Street; Carberry MB	49°52′11″N 99°21′19″W	Carberry municipality (10440)		Upload Photo
Moon Apartments	30 Main Street; Carberry MB	49°52′11″N 99°21′19″W	Carberry municipality (10442)		Upload Photo
McCullough Building	48 Main Street; Carberry MB	49°52′11″N 99°21′19″W	Carberry municipality (10443)		Upload Photo
Wright Building	46 Main Street; Carberry MB	49°52′11″N 99°21′19″W	Carberry municipality (10446)		Upload Photo
Modern Bakery	42 Main Street; Carberry MB	49°52′11″N 99°21′19″W	Carberry municipality (10448)		Upload Photo
Royal Canadian Legion	25 Main Street; Carberry MB	49°52′11″N 99°21′19″W	Carberry municipality (10567)		Upload Photo
Charlie Sear Building	19-21 Main Street; Carberry MB	49°52′11″N 99°21′19″W	Carberry municipality (10568)		Upload Photo
Murphy Block	29 Main Street; Carberry MB	49°52′11″N 99°21′19″W	Carberry municipality (10569)		Upload Photo
Carberry-North Cypress Library	115 Main Street; Carberry MB	49°52′11″N 99°21′19″W	Carberry municipality (10739)		Upload Photo
Waters Block	125 Main Street; Carberry MB	49°52′11″N 99°21′19″W	Carberry municipality (10779)		Upload Photo
Davidson Building	109 Main Street; Carberry MB	49°52′11″N 99°21′19″W	Carberry municipality (10780)		Upload Photo
Sid's Garage	135 Main Street; Carberry MB	49°52′11″N 99°21′19″W	Carberry municipality (17081)		Upload Photo
Flower Shop	110 Main Street; Carberry MB	49°52′11″N 99°21′19″W	Carberry municipality (15839)		Upload Photo
C.V.M. Café	24 Main Street; Carberry MB	49°52′11″N 99°21′19″W	Carberry municipality (15849)		Upload Photo
Carberry Public Washroom	113 Main Street; Carberry MB	49°52′11″N 99°21′19″W	Carberry municipality (17082)		Upload Photo
Birtle Union Bank Building	738 Main Street; Birtle MB	50°25′21″N 101°02′35″W	Birtle municipality (3884)		Upload Photo
Old Deloraine Bank Vault	Deloraine MB	49°09′33″N 100°24′29″W	Deloraine municipality (4829)		
Deloraine Presbyterian Church	220 South Railway Avenue West; Deloraine MB	49°11′33″N 100°29′46″W	Deloraine municipality (5377)		
Boundary Commission Trail - Turtlehead Creek Crossing	Deloraine MB	49°08′04″N 100°24′04″W	Manitoba (8149)		Upload Photo
St. Paul's United Church	590 Johnson Street; Boissevain MB	49°13′50″N 100°03′11″W	Manitoba (3489)		More images
Boissevain Town Hall	578 Cook Street; Boissevain MB	49°13′23″N 100°03′25″W	Boissevain municipality (3685)		
Welch Block	410-412 South Railway Street; Boissevain MB	49°13′50″N 100°03′14″W	Boissevain municipality (4876)		Upload Photo
Cottingham House	Boissevain MB	49°13′12″N 100°02′10″W	Boissevain municipality (5304)		Upload Photo
Dow House	721 Mill Road; Boissevain MB	49°14′03″N 100°03′32″W	Boissevain municipality (5375)		Upload Photo
Armstrong Homestead	Boissevain MB	49°11′47″N 100°03′00″W	Boissevain municipality (5096)		Upload Photo
McKinney House	10 km southwest of Boissevain; Boissevain MB	49°10′23″N 100°08′05″W	Boissevain municipality (5083)		Upload Photo
Arrow River Standing Stone Site	Hamiota MB	50°55′48″N 100°31′26″W	Manitoba (7329)		Upload Photo
Union Bank Building	39 Maple Avenue East; Hamiota MB	50°10′47″N 100°35′46″W	Hamiota municipality (4072)		Upload Photo
Kaye House	17 Government Allowance Road; Melita MB	49°16′55″N 100°59′38″W	Melita municipality (2781)		Upload Photo
Belfry School	SW 5-4-27 WPM; Melita MB	49°16′00″N 101°05′53″W	Melita municipality (3359)		Upload Photo
Brockinton National Historic Site of Canada	East bank of Souris River; Melita MB		Federal (19003)		
Melita United Church Manse	79 Ash Street; Melita MB	49°16′20″N 100°59′24″W	Melita municipality (4898)		Upload Photo
Sourisford Park	Melita MB	49°08′08″N 101°00′29″W	Melita municipality (8152)		More images
Linear Mounds National Historic Site of Canada	Melita MB	49°07′00″N 101°01′16″W	Federal (10475)		
McDonald Drug Store and Bakery	237 Nelson Street West; Virden MB	49°50′52″N 100°55′48″W	Virden municipality (10982)		Upload Photo
Wright House	114 Sowden Street; Souris MB	49°37′04″N 100°15′22″W	Souris municipality (2770)		Upload Photo
F. Sowden House	26 Crescent Avenue; Souris MB	49°36′58″N 100°15′22″W	Souris municipality (3196)		
Souris Dominion Post Office	21 Crescent Avenue; Souris MB	49°36′58″N 100°15′32″W	Souris municipality (3201)		
St. Luke's Anglican Church	140 First Street South; Souris MB	49°36′58″N 100°15′18″W	Souris municipality (8609)		Upload Photo
Dolmage House	44-4th Avenue; Souris MB	49°37′08″N 100°15′47″W	Souris municipality (13546)		Upload Photo
Demonstration Farm House	44 Water Street; Killarney MB	49°10′23″N 99°40′17″W	Killarney municipality (4233)		Upload Photo
Canadian National Railways Station	Rivers MB	50°01′44″N 100°14′10″W	Federal (4324)		
Shaver House	Killarney MB	49°13′26″N 99°37′46″W	Killarney municipality (5065)		Upload Photo
Hay House	402 Clark Avenue; Killarney MB	49°10′53″N 99°40′02″W	Killarney municipality (5772)		Upload Photo
Canadian Pacific Railway Station	Railway Ave. (at Hway 16A and 2nd Ave.); Minnedosa MB	50°15′02″N 99°50′24″W	Federal (4557)		Upload Photo
Myers House	149-2nd Avenue SW; Minnedosa MB	50°14′49″N 99°50′36″W	Minnedosa municipality (2712)		Upload Photo
Manitoba Power Commission Building	100 Heritage Park Crescent; Minnedosa MB	50°15′15″N 99°49′46″W	Minnedosa municipality (3319)		Upload Photo
Beautiful Plains County Court Building	282 Hamilton Street; Neepawa MB	50°13′42″N 99°27′52″W	Federal (12302), Manitoba (3544)		More images
McKay House	110 4th Street SE; Minnedosa MB	50°14′49″N 99°49′56″W	Minnedosa municipality (3556)		Upload Photo
Minnedosa Agricultural Society Display Building	Agricultural Society Fairgrounds; Minnedosa MB	50°15′26″N 99°50′42″W	Manitoba (5092)		Upload Photo
Minnedosa Dominion Post Office	103 Main Street South; Minnedosa MB	50°14′50″N 99°50′21″W	Minnedosa municipality (5362)		
Sprague House	100 Heritage Park Crescent; Minnedosa MB	50°15′14″N 99°49′48″W	Minnedosa municipality (5373)		Upload Photo
Tanner's Crossing	Minnedosa MB	50°14′54″N 99°49′53″W	Minnedosa municipality (6551)		Upload Photo
Drysdale House	SW 35-14-14 WPM - Highway 16; Neepawa MB	50°13′28″N 99°28′07″W	Neepawa municipality (6644)		Upload Photo
Minnedosa Canadian Pacific Railway Station	Railway Avenue; Minnedosa MB	50°15′02″N 99°50′24″W	Minnedosa municipality (7330)		Upload Photo
Thompson Family Rest Site	101 Elizabeth Street; Shoal Lake MB	50°26′13″N 100°35′56″W	Shoal Lake municipality (8048)		Upload Photo
Canadian National Railway Station	91 Hamilton Street; Neepawa MB	50°13′43″N 99°28′26″W	Federal (7886)		Upload Photo
Davidson House	344 Main Street East; Neepawa MB	50°13′25″N 99°27′47″W	Neepawa municipality (3172)		Upload Photo
Independent Order of Odd Fellows Building	376 Mountain Avenue; Neepawa MB	50°13′45″N 99°27′57″W	Manitoba (3966)		Upload Photo
Knox Presbyterian Church	396 First Street; Neepawa MB	50°13′48″N 99°28′03″W	Manitoba (3391)		Upload Photo
Margaret Laurence House	312 First Avenue; Neepawa MB	50°13′43″N 99°27′51″W	Manitoba (4235)		More images
Roxy Theatre	291 Hamilton Street; Neepawa MB	50°13′43″N 99°27′54″W	Neepawa municipality (6169)		More images
McKenzie House	Near Jct MB 10 and MB 24; Rapid City MB	50°07′30″N 99°56′29″W	Rapid City municipality (5054)		Upload Photo
Rapid City Museum and Cultural Centre	4th Avenue at 4th Street; Rapid City MB	50°07′08″N 100°02′10″W	Rapid City municipality (19367)		Upload Photo
Northfield School	South Cypress MB		South Cypress municipality (5078)		Upload Photo
St. John the Divine Anglican Church	102 4th Street (SE corner of Cliff Street); Wawanesa MB	49°35′36″N 99°41′02″W	Manitoba (4266)		Upload Photo
Wawanesa Mutual Insurance Company Building	102 4th Street (SW corner of Cliff Street); Wawanesa MB	49°35′38″N 99°41′02″W	Manitoba (15282), Wawanesa municipality (4234)		

== See also ==
- List of historic places in Manitoba
- List of National Historic Sites of Canada in Manitoba
