= List of ghost towns in Manitoba =

Over the course of its history, the province of Manitoba has witnessed numerous of its populated communities experience decline to become ghost towns. Triggers were usually changes in economic conditions, such as natural resource prices or resource depletion, or changes in transportation networks, such as rail alignment selection, rail line closures and highway realignments.

== List ==
Community	Rural municipality	Peak population	Peak year
Albert	Rural Municipality of Albert		
Archibald	Rural Municipality of Pembina		
Asessippi			
Bannerman			
Belleview	Rural Municipality of Sifton		
Bender Hamlet	Rural Municipality of Armstrong		
Bradburn	Rural Municipality of Dufferin		
Bradwardine	Rural Municipality of Daly		
Decker			
Carnagie	Rural Municipality of Elton		
Dropmore			
Dung Drop Falls			
Ebor	Rural Municipality of Pipestone		
Ewart	Rural Municipality of Pipestone		
Gartmore			
Grand Valley			
Grantown			
Greenway			
Hecla			
Hilton			
Horod			
Isabella	Rural Municipality of Miniota		
Lauder	Rural Municipality of Cameron		
Lavinia			
Littleton			
Makinak			
Manitoba City			
McArthur's Landing			
McConnell			
Methven			
Millford			
Millwood	Municipality of Russell – Binscarth		
Moore Park			
Mountain Road			
Mowbray			
Nelsonville			
Norquay			
Odanah	Rural Municipality of Odanah		
Old Dauphin			
Old Deloraine			
Old Stockton			
Polonia			
Port Nelson		1,000	c. 1914
Rea			
Ste. Elizabeth			
Seech			
Sioux Village			
Souris City			
Spearhill			
Stockton			
Sundance			
Totogan			
Wakopa			
Whitewater	Rural Municipality of Whitewater		

== See also ==
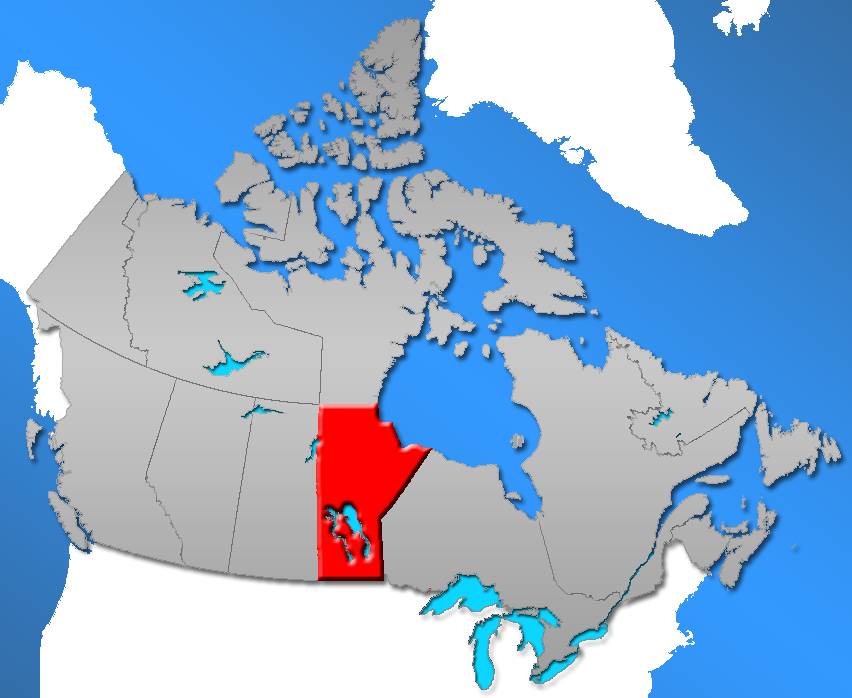
Ghost towns in Canada by province or territory
- List of census divisions of Manitoba
- List of communities in Manitoba
- List of ghost towns in Canada
- List of municipalities in Manitoba
- York Factory – former trading post
