= Linklater, Manitoba =

Linklater
- Location of Linklater in Manitoba
- Coordinates: 49°33′44″N 101°11′25″W
- Country: Canada
- Province: Manitoba
- Region: Westman Region
- Census Division: No. 6

Government
  - Governing Body: Rural Municipality of Pipestone Council
  - MP: Grant Jackson
  - MLA: Greg Nesbitt
- Time zone: UTC−6 (CST)
  - Summer (DST): UTC−5 (CDT)
- Area code: 204
- NTS Map: 062F11
- GNBC Code: GAOQW

Linklater is a locality in southwestern Manitoba, Canada. It is located approximately 7 kilometers (4 miles) west of Reston, Manitoba in the Rural Municipality of Pipestone.
