= Butler, Manitoba =

Community in Manitoba, Canada

Butler
- Location of Butler in Manitoba
- Coordinates: 49°47′43″N 101°21′38″W
- Country: Canada
- Province: Manitoba
- Region: Westman Region
- Census Division: No. 6

Government
  - Governing Body: Rural Municipality of Pipestone Council
  - MP: Grant Jackson
  - MLA: Greg Nesbitt
- Time zone: UTC−6 (CST)
  - Summer (DST): UTC−5 (CDT)
- Area codes: 204, 431
- NTS Map: 062F14
- GNBC Code: GAEBC

Butler is an unincorporated community located within the Rural Municipality of Pipestone in southwestern Manitoba, Canada. It is located approximately 31 kilometres (19 miles) southwest of Virden, Manitoba.

== See also ==
- Pipestone Creek (Saskatchewan)
