= Scarth, Manitoba =

Scarth
- Location of Scarth in Manitoba
- Coordinates: 49°43′49″N 100°56′59″W
- Country: Canada
- Province: Manitoba
- Region: Westman Region
- Census Division: No. 6

Government
  - Governing Body: Rural Municipality of Pipestone Council
  - MP: Grant Jackson
  - MLA: Greg Nesbitt
- Time zone: UTC−6 (CST)
  - Summer (DST): UTC−5 (CDT)
- Area code: 204
- NTS Map: 062F10
- GNBC Code: GAYLE

Scarth is an unincorporated community in southwestern Manitoba, Canada. It is located approximately 13 kilometers (8 miles) south of Virden, Manitoba in the Rural Municipality of Pipestone.

== 2020 Tornado ==
A violent EF3 tornado struck the community of Scarth on August 7, 2020, killing 2 people. The tornado would get an official rating of EF3, but further research suggested that the tornado had windspeeds over 400 km/h (250 miles per hour), well over the threshold of EF5 status.

== See also ==
- Elie, Manitoba
- 2007 Elie tornado
- Alonsa, Manitoba (rural municipality)
- Pipestone, Manitoba
- Rural Municipality of Pipestone
