= Sinclair, Manitoba =

Sinclair
- Location of Sinclair in Manitoba
- Coordinates: 49°34′9″N 101°17′16″W
- Country: Canada
- Province: Manitoba
- Region: Westman Region
- Census Division: No. 6

Government
  - Type: William Kerman =
  - Governing Body: Rural Municipality of Pipestone Council
  - MP: Grant Jackson
  - MLA: Greg Nesbitt
- Time zone: UTC−6 (CST)
  - Summer (DST): UTC−5 (CDT)
- Postal Code: R0M 2A0
- Area code: 204
- NTS Map: 062F11
- GNBC Code: GAZIK

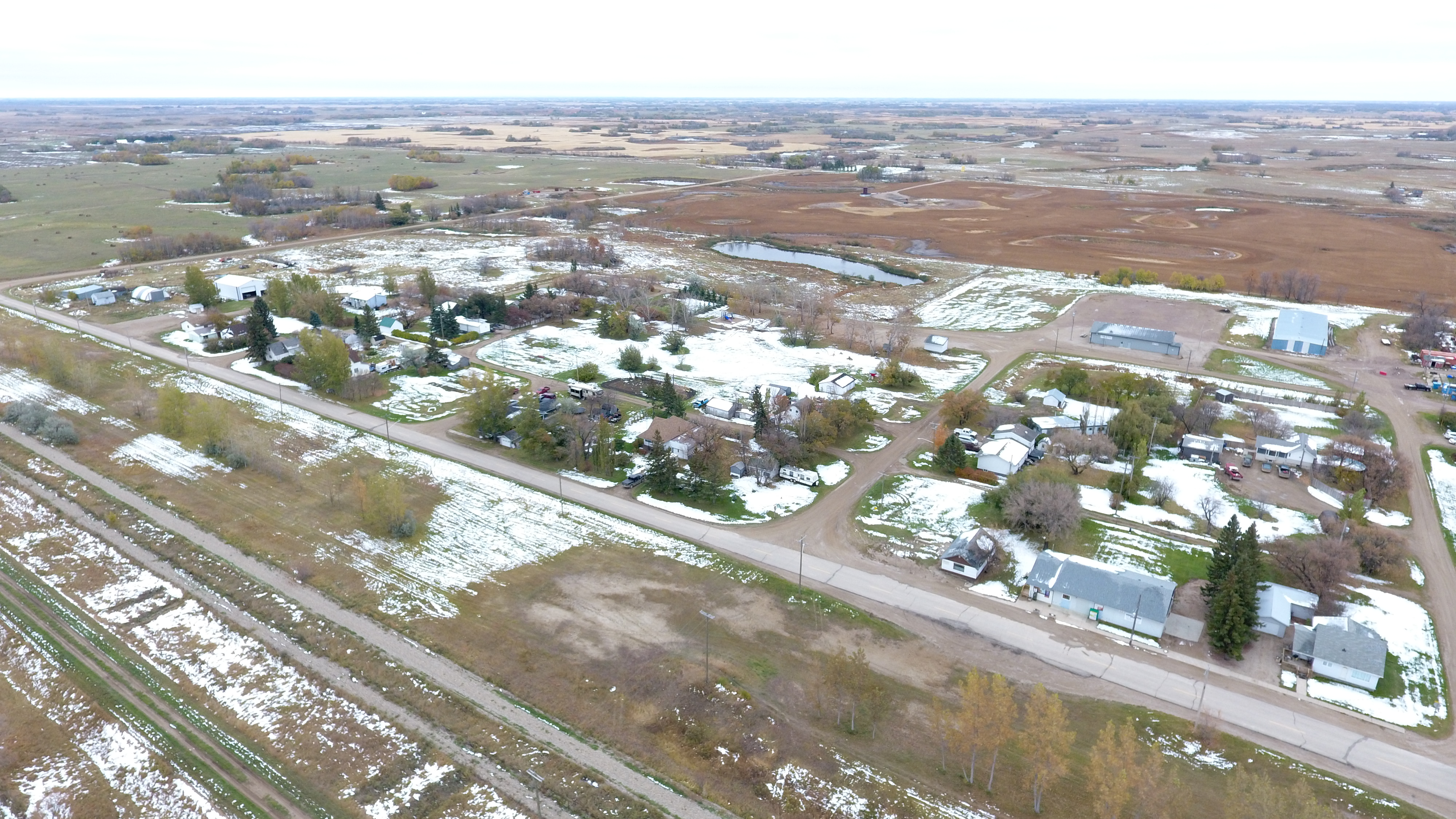
Views of Sinclair, fall 2018.

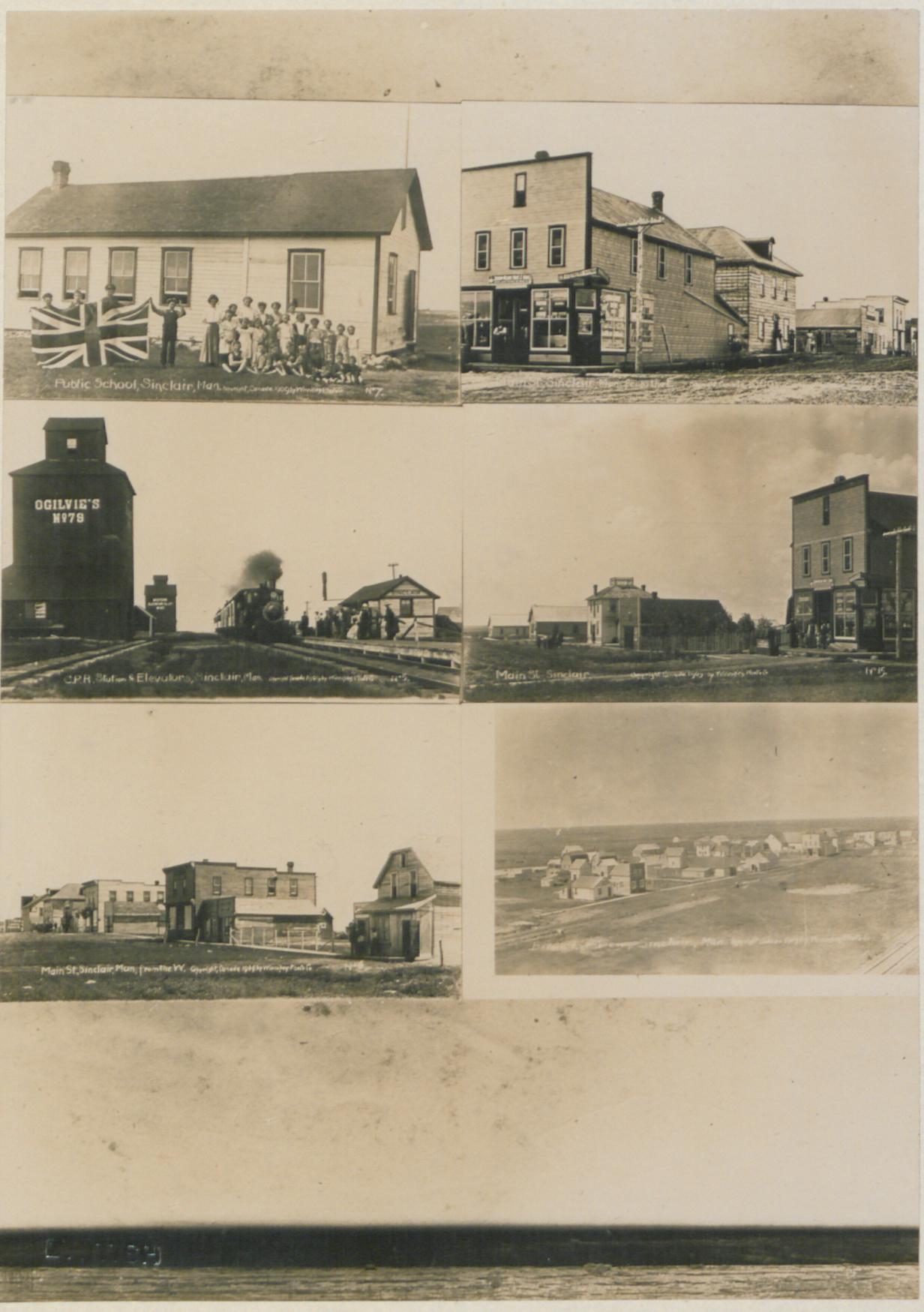
Views of Sinclair, 1909.

Sinclair is a community in the Canadian province of Manitoba, approximately 10 km (6.2 mi) east of the Saskatchewan border and approximately 14 kilometers (9 miles) west of Reston, Manitoba, in the Rural Municipality of Pipestone.
