= Cromer, Manitoba =

Community in Manitoba, Canada

Cromer
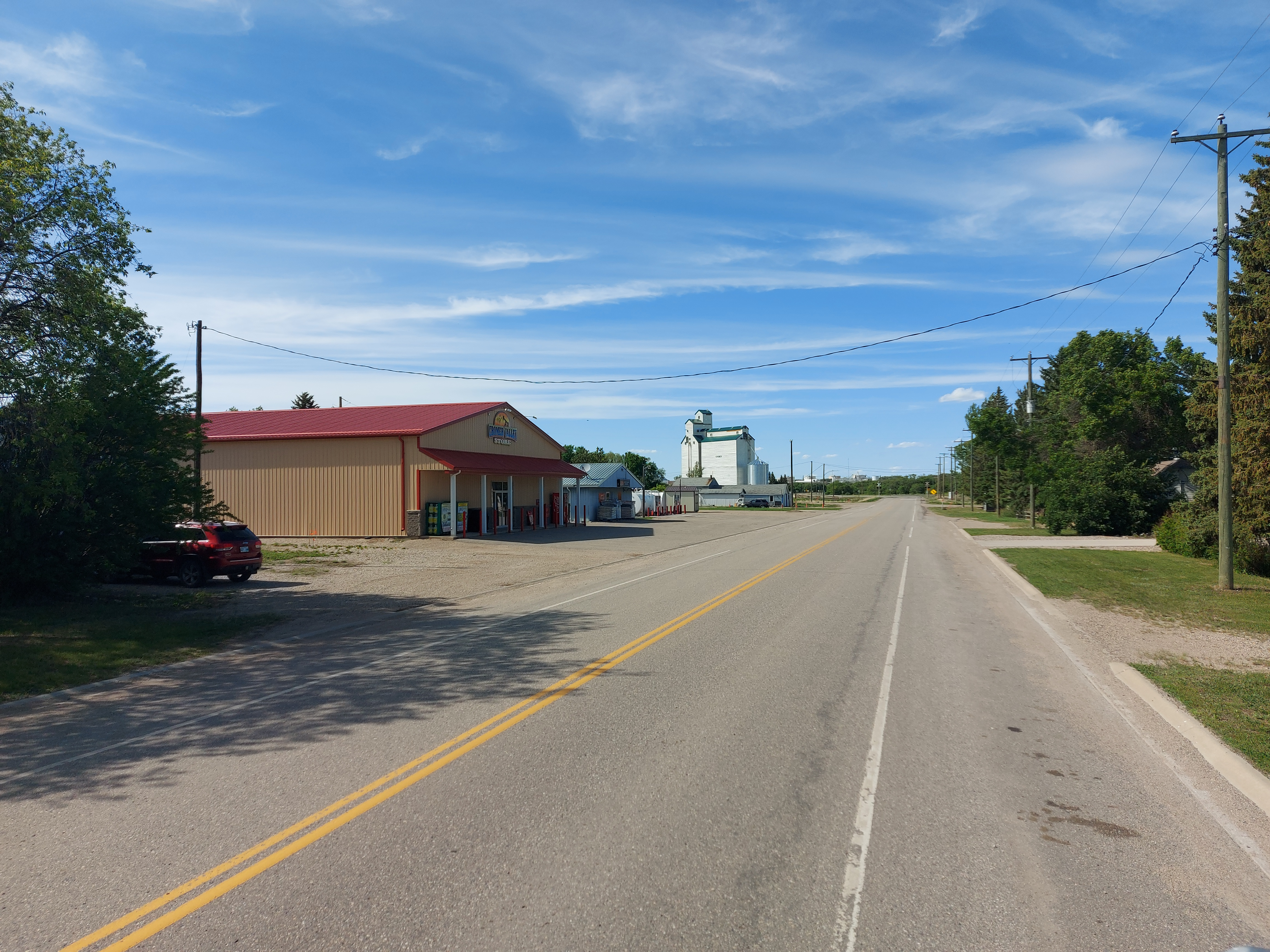
- Cromer, Manitoba

- Location of Cromer in Manitoba
- Coordinates: 49°43′53″N 101°14′6″W
- Country: Canada
- Province: Manitoba
- Region: Westman Region
- Census Division: No. 6

Government
  - Governing Body: Rural Municipality of Pipestone Council
  - MP: Grant Jackson
  - MLA: Greg Nesbitt
- Time zone: UTC−6 (CST)
  - Summer (DST): UTC−5 (CDT)
- Postal Code: R0M 0J0
- Area code: 204
- NTS Map: 062F11
- GNBC Code: GAFUR

Cromer, Manitoba is a village in the Rural Municipality of Pipestone, in south-western Manitoba, Canada, in a region called Westman.

In 1884, the Post Office was opened at LSD 26-8-28W and was known as Elm Valley. The name was changed to Cromer when the Canadian Northern Railway came through in 1907.

The community is situated alongside Pipestone Creek in the Pipestone Valley. The valley was formed almost 20,000 years ago during the melting of the last glaciation. The melting waters formed the Pipestone Spillway, which is the valley seen today. The village sits at the intersections of Provincial Roads 256 and 255 and consists of several businesses, residences, and churches. There is also an ice rink and a 9-hole golf course.

Enbridge Line 2B starts just north of the village at the Tundra Oil & Gas plant.

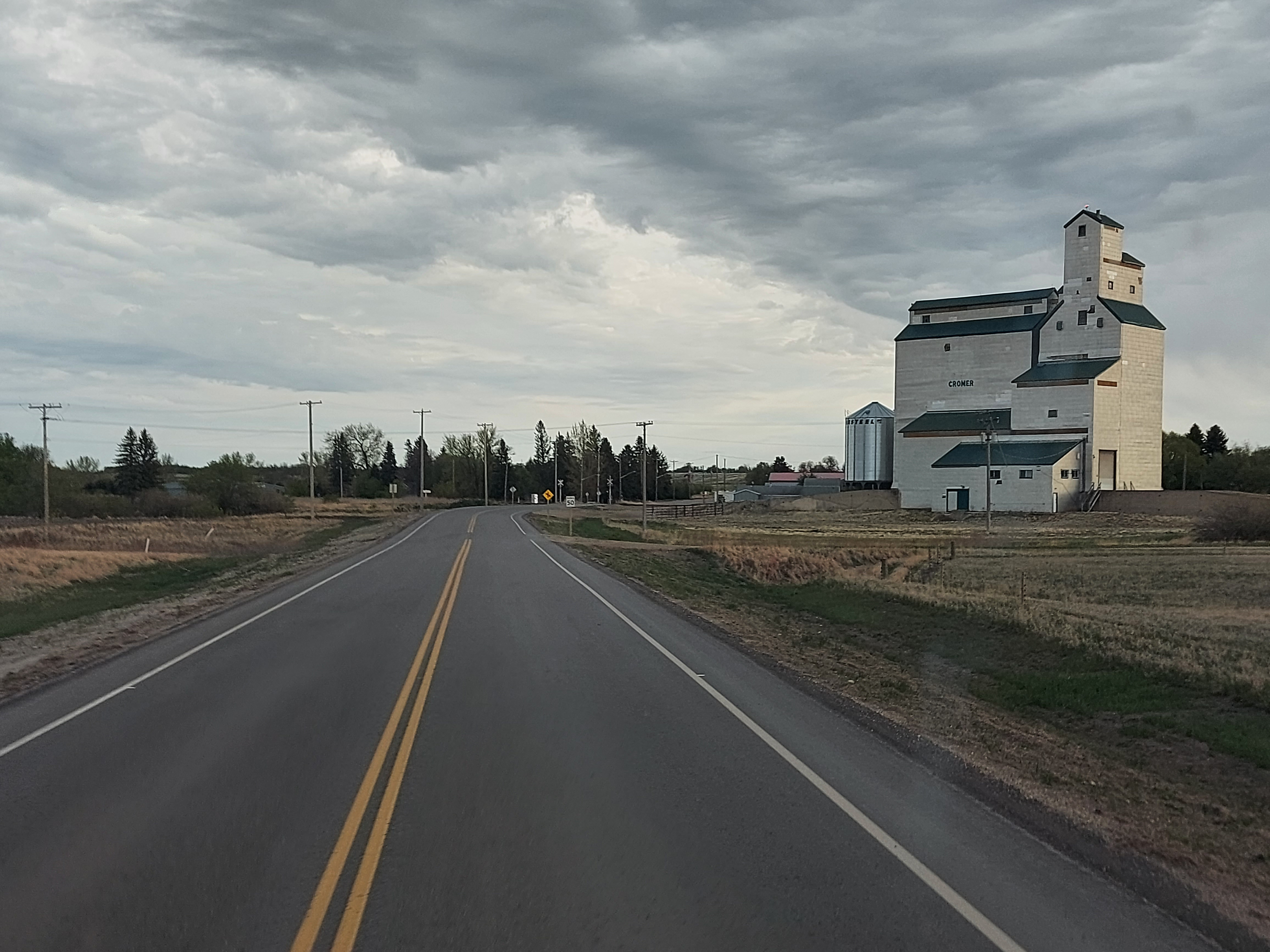
Going south into Cromer on highway 256 by the grain elevator

== Cromer United Church ==
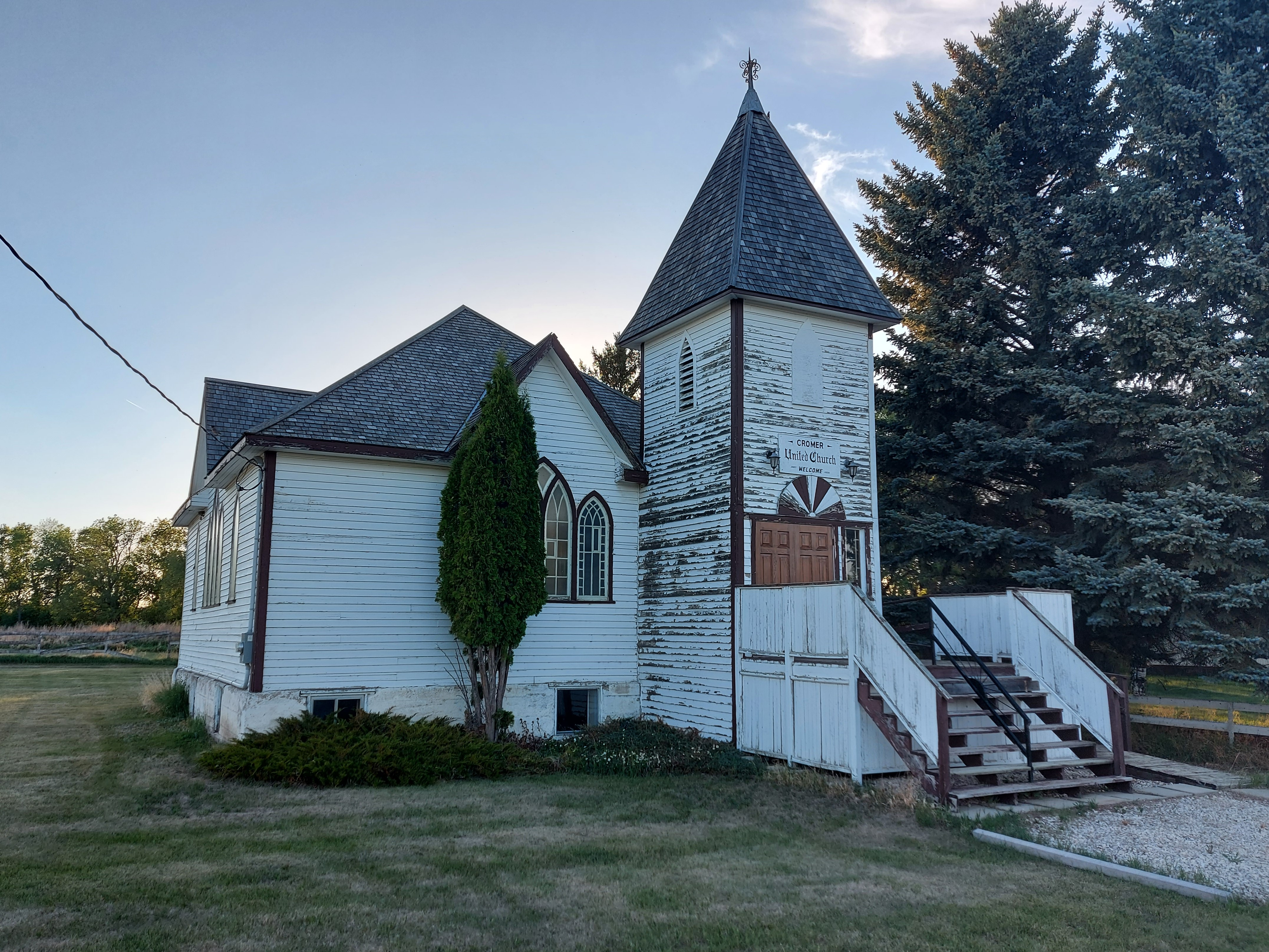
The Cromer United church, Manitoba Municipal Heritage Site No. 89

The Cromer United Church, built in 1911, is designated "Manitoba Municipal Heritage Site No. 89" and part of the Canadian Register of Historic Places. It was originally called Cromer Methodist Church and was built for the Methodist congregation and its architecture is a modest Gothic Revival-style wooden church. As a heritage site, it was recognised on 10 December 1992 and was listed in the Canadian Register on 17 February 2006.

== Notable residents ==
- Mary Carter, judge

== See also ==
- List of historic places in Westman Region, Manitoba
- List of oil pipelines
- Cromer, England
