= Ewart, Manitoba =

Ewart
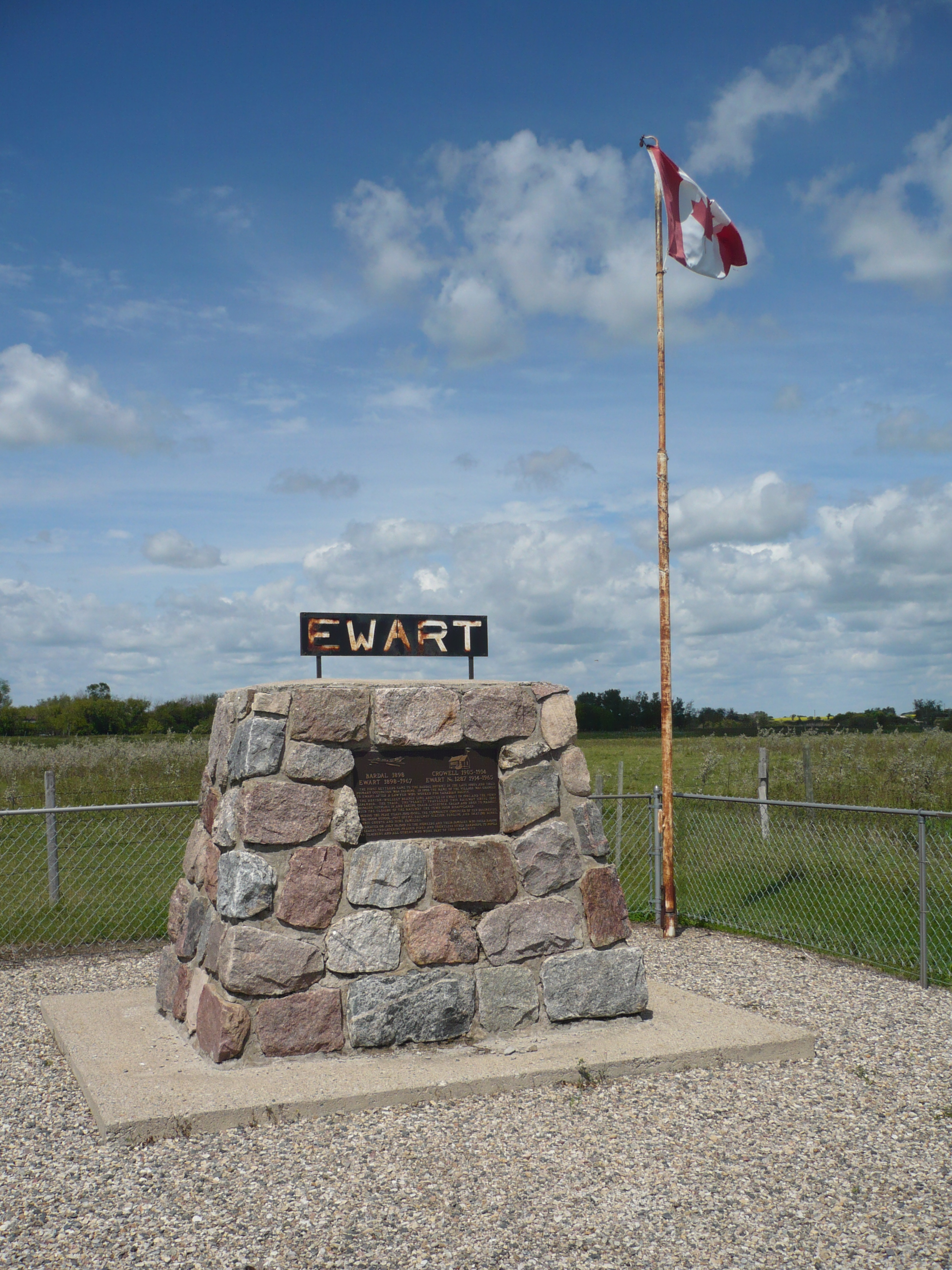
- Cairn commemorating Ewart

- Location of Ewart in Manitoba
- Coordinates: 49°38′48″N 101°12′58″W
- Country: Canada
- Province: Manitoba
- Region: Westman Region
- Census Division: No. 6

Government
  - Governing Body: Rural Municipality of Pipestone Council
  - MP: Grant Jackson
  - MLA: Greg Nesbitt
- Time zone: UTC−6 (CST)
  - Summer (DST): UTC−5 (CDT)
- Area code: 204
- NTS Map: 062F11
- GNBC Code: GAHWZ

Ewart is a locality in southwestern Manitoba, Canada. All that remains of the settlement is a cairn, an abandoned house, and the former schoolhouse. Little is known about the schoolhouse but it did exist as early as 1914.

The Crowell School District was formed in March, 1904 encompassing the area that became known as Ewart. The arrival of the railway led to the establishment of a post office on June 10, 1907. The post office was initially named Bardal Station, as this railway stop served the nearby district of Bardal. On March 1, 1908, the post office's name was changed to Haanel. The post office was renamed Ewart on January 1, 1909, in honour of the constitutional lawyer John Skirving Ewart. Crowell School District was renamed Ewart School District in 1914.

The closure of the railway caused the rapid decline of Ewart. Ewart School District dissolved in December, 1965 and the Post Office closed permanently on October 31, 1967.

Ewart is located approximately 31 kilometers (19 miles) southwest of Virden, Manitoba in the Rural Municipality of Pipestone.

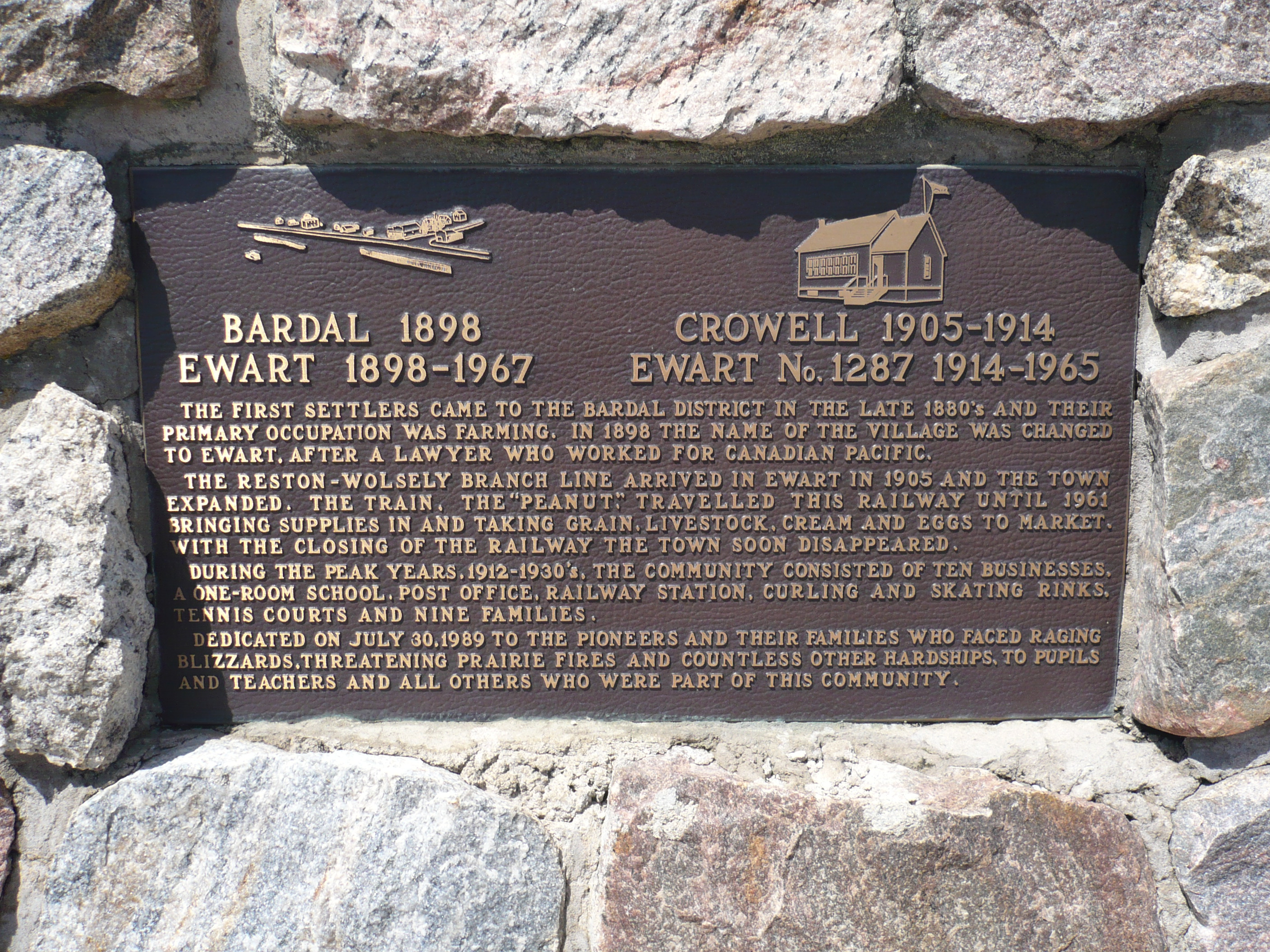
Plaque in the Cairn at Ewart
