= Findlay, Manitoba =

Findlay
- Location of Findlay in Manitoba
- Coordinates: 49°34′5″N 100°45′27″W
- Country: Canada
- Province: Manitoba
- Region: Westman Region
- Census Division: No. 6

Government
  - Governing Body: Rural Municipality of Sifton Council
  - MP: Grant Jackson
  - MLA: Colleen Robbins
- Time zone: UTC−6 (CST)
  - Summer (DST): UTC−5 (CDT)
- Area codes: 204, 431
- NTS Map: 062F10
- GNBC Code: GAIEE

Findlay is a locality within the Rural Municipality of Sifton in southwestern Manitoba, Canada. It is located approximately 34 kilometers (21 miles) southeast of Virden, Manitoba.
