= Woodnorth, Manitoba =

Woodnorth
- Location of Woodnorth in Manitoba
- Coordinates: 49°43′57″N 101°4′52″W
- Country: Canada
- Province: Manitoba
- Region: Westman Region
- Census Division: No. 6

Government
  - Governing Body: Rural Municipality of Pipestone Council
  - MP: Grant Jackson
  - MLA: Greg Nesbitt
- Time zone: UTC−6 (CST)
  - Summer (DST): UTC−5 (CDT)
- Area code: 204
- NTS Map: 062F11
- GNBC Code: GBENL

Woodnorth is an unincorporated community in southwestern Manitoba, Canada. It is located approximately 17 kilometers (11 miles) southwest of Virden, Manitoba in the Rural Municipality of Pipestone.
