= Two Creeks, Manitoba =

Two Creeks
- Location of Two Creeks in Manitoba
- Coordinates: 50°1′34″N 101°2′5″W
- Country: Canada
- Province: Manitoba
- Region: Westman Region
- Census Division: No. 6

Government
  - Governing Body: Rural Municipality of Wallace Council
  - MP: Grant Jackson
  - MLA: Greg Nesbitt
- Time zone: UTC−6 (CST)
  - Summer (DST): UTC−5 (CDT)
- Area code: 204
- NTS Map: 062K03
- GNBC Code: GBCIO
- Website: link label

Two Creeks is an unincorporated community in southwestern Manitoba, Canada. It is located approximately 21 kilometers (13 miles) northwest of Virden, Manitoba in the Rural Municipality of Wallace.
