= Hargrave, Manitoba =

Hargrave
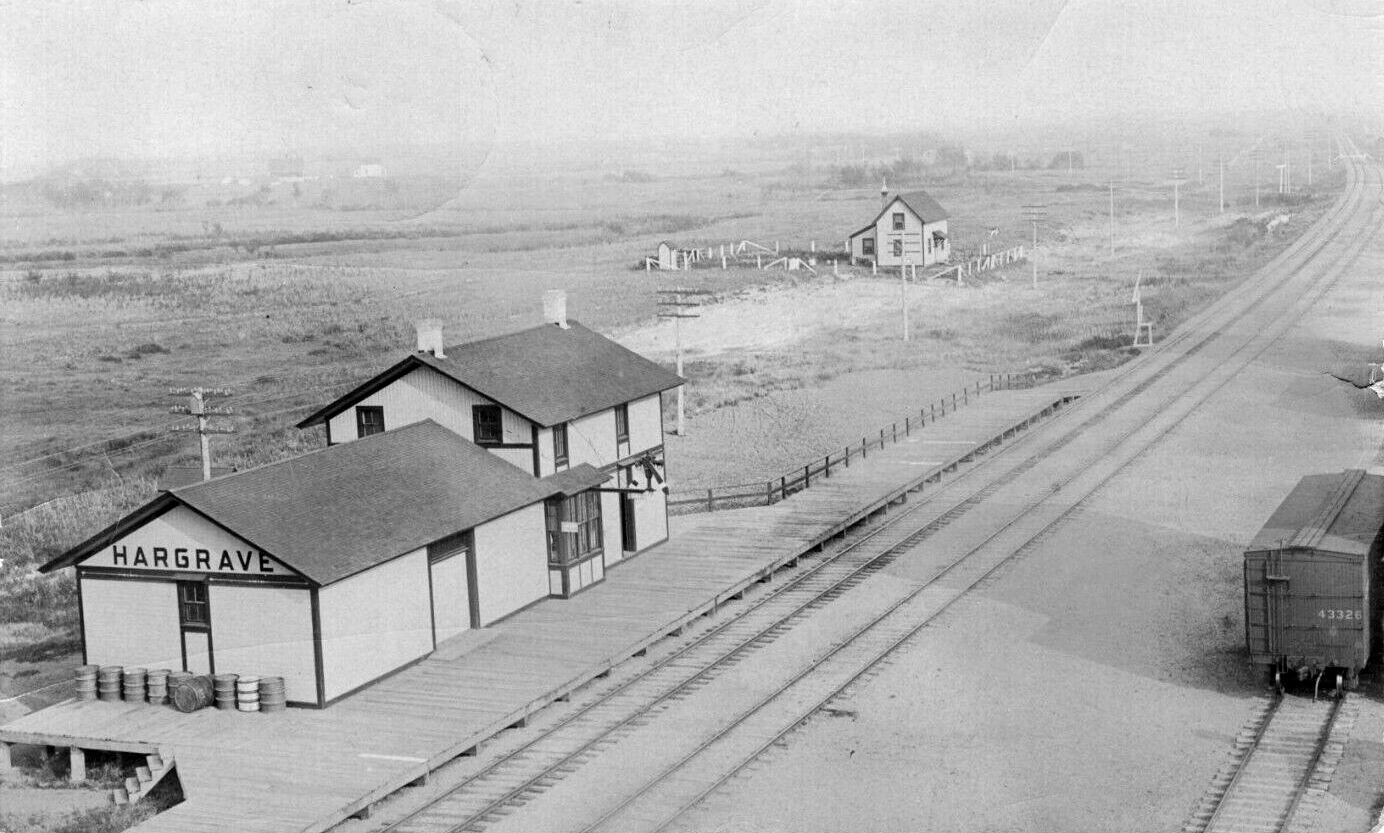
- Hargrave, 1911

- Location of Hargrave in Manitoba
- Coordinates: 49°55′2″N 101°4′19″W
- Country: Canada
- Province: Manitoba
- Region: Westman Region
- Census Division: No. 6

Government
  - Governing Body: Rural Municipality of Wallace Council
  - MP: Greg Nesbitt
  - MLA: Vacant
- Time zone: UTC−6 (CST)
  - Summer (DST): UTC−5 (CDT)
- Postal Code: R0M 0W0
- Area code: 204
- NTS Map: 062F14
- GNBC Code: GAKIO

Hargrave is an unincorporated settlement in southwestern Manitoba, Canada. It is situated on the Trans-Canada Highway approximately 12 kilometers (8 miles) northwest of Virden, Manitoba in the Rural Municipality of Wallace.
