= James Frame =

Canadian politician

James Findlay Frame
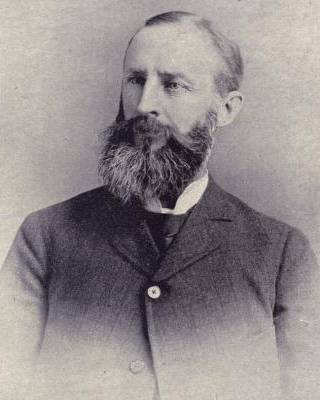

Member of the Legislative Assembly of Manitoba for Dennis
- In office July 23, 1892 – January 15, 1896
- Preceded by: Daniel Dennis McLean
- Succeeded by: Watson Montgomery Crosby

2nd Reeve of the Rural Municipality of Wallace, Manitoba
- In office 1888–1891
- Preceded by: Adam Gerrond McDougall
- Succeeded by: William Mair Cushing

Personal details
- Born: September 4, 1841 New York City, New York
- Died: September 28, 1923 (aged 82) Vancouver, British Columbia

James Findlay Frame (September 4, 1841 – September 28, 1923) was an American-born merchant and political figure in Manitoba. He represented Dennis from 1892 to 1895 in the Legislative Assembly of Manitoba as a Conservative.

He was born in New York City, the son of John Frame and Mary Findlay, both natives of Scotland, and was educated in Simcoe County, Ontario, at Williamsville Academy in New York and at a business college in Poughkeepsie, New York. After completing his schooling, Frame operated a sawmill in Glencairn until 1876. During the American Civil War, he served in the Collingwood company which protected the Canada–US border against possible raids. Frame came west to Winnipeg in 1882, soon afterwards settling in Virden. There, he established a general hardware and lumber business in partnership with G. N. Miller. Frame served as reeve of the Rural Municipality of Wallace from 1887 to 1891. In 1888, he married Abbey E. Layton. Frame was defeated when he ran for reelection to the Manitoba assembly in 1896.

In 1911, Frame retired to Vancouver. He died in Point Grey, Vancouver at the age of 82.
