= Two Creeks =

Two Creeks may refer to:

- Two Creeks, Alberta, Canada
- Two Creeks, Manitoba, Canada
- Two Creeks, Wisconsin, United States, a town
  - Two Creeks, Wisconsin (community), within the above town
  - Two Creeks Air Force Station
