= Watson Montgomery Crosby =

Canadian politician

Reeve of The Rural Municipality of Wallace, Manitoba
- In office 1893–1896
- Preceded by: William M. Cushing
- Succeeded by: George A. Freeman

Member of the Legislative Assembly of Manitoba for Dennis
- In office January 15, 1896 – March 19, 1897
- Preceded by: James Frame
- Succeeded by: William James Kennedy

Personal details
- Born: June 10, 1857 French River, Prince Edward Island
- Died: March 19, 1897 (aged 39) Winnipeg, Manitoba

Watson Montgomery Crosby (June 10, 1857 – March 19, 1897) served as the reeve of the Rural Municipality of Wallace and as a member of the Legislative Assembly of Manitoba for the constituency of Dennis.

Crosby was born at French River, Prince Edward Island, the son of Charles Crosby. His grandfather, Donald Montgomery, served as member of the Legislative Assembly of Prince Edward Island and represented Prince Edward Island as a member of the Senate of Canada.

Crosby moved to Manitoba in 1879 and settled on a farm near Virden. He was elected as a Councillor for the Rural Municipality of Wallace and served as Reeve from 1893 to 1896. He was elected to the Legislative Assembly of Manitoba representing the Constituency of Dennis in the Province of Manitoba's Ninth General Election on January 15, 1896. He was a candidate for the Patrons of Industry.

Crosby held his seat in the Legislative Assembly of Manitoba until his death. He died in Winnipeg, unmarried, of typhoid fever on March 19, 1897.
