= William James Kennedy (politician) =

Canadian politician

Member of the Legislative Assembly of Manitoba for Dennis
- In office 1897–1899

Personal details
- Born: June 9, 1857 Chatham-Kent, Province of Canada
- Died: December 22, 1912 (aged 55) Winnipeg, Manitoba
- Party: Liberal
- Spouse: Sarah Jane Brady

William James Kennedy (June 9, 1857 – December 22, 1912) was a Canadian farmer, merchant and politician in Manitoba. He represented Dennis from 1897 to 1899 in the Legislative Assembly of Manitoba as a Liberal.

== Early life ==
He was born in Chatham-Kent, Province of Canada, the son of George Kennedy, a native of County Antrim Northern Ireland. He was educated there and came to Manitoba in 1882.

== Career ==
He served as mayor of Virden, Manitoba. Kennedy ran unsuccessfully for a seat in the Manitoba assembly in 1896 and then was elected in an 1897 by-election held following the death of Watson Crosby. He was defeated when he ran for election to the assembly in 1899 in the newly created riding of Virden.

From 1901 to 1912, he was an employee of the Immigration, Refugees and Citizenship Canada in Winnipeg, Manitoba.

== Personal life ==
Kennedy was married to Sarah Jane Brady. Kennedy died at home in Winnipeg in 1912.
