= Reston, Manitoba =

Community in Manitoba, Canada

Reston
- Downtown Reston

- Location of Reston in Manitoba Reston (Canada)
- Coordinates: 49°33′27″N 101°5′36″W
- Country: Canada
- Province: Manitoba
- Region: Westman Region
- Census Division: No. 6

Government
  - Governing Body: Rural Municipality of Pipestone Council
  - MP: Grant Jackson
  - MLA: Greg Nesbitt

Area
  - City: 5.34 km^{2} (2.06 sq mi)

Population (2016 Census)
  - Urban: 569
  - Urban density: 106.6/km^{2} (276/sq mi)
- Time zone: UTC−6 (CST)
  - Summer (DST): UTC−5 (CDT)
- Postal Code: R0M 1X0
- Area code: 204
- NTS Map: 062F11
- GNBC Code: GAWXR

Reston is an unincorporated community recognized as a local urban district in southwestern Manitoba, Canada, located near the border of Saskatchewan on the west and North Dakota on the south. It is the largest community in the Rural Municipality of Pipestone. It is situated along Highway 2 at the intersection with Provincial Road 252.

== History ==
The name of the community was derived from the area where many of the original settlers came from, which was Reston Junction in Berwickshire, Scotland. The post office opened in 1890 on land location 9-7-27W. It was also a Canadian Pacific railway point and there was a school district which had the name Lanark and a district named Reston was later located on 9-7-27W.

In October 2012, Reston sold lots in the community for $10 in order to attract families and businesses.

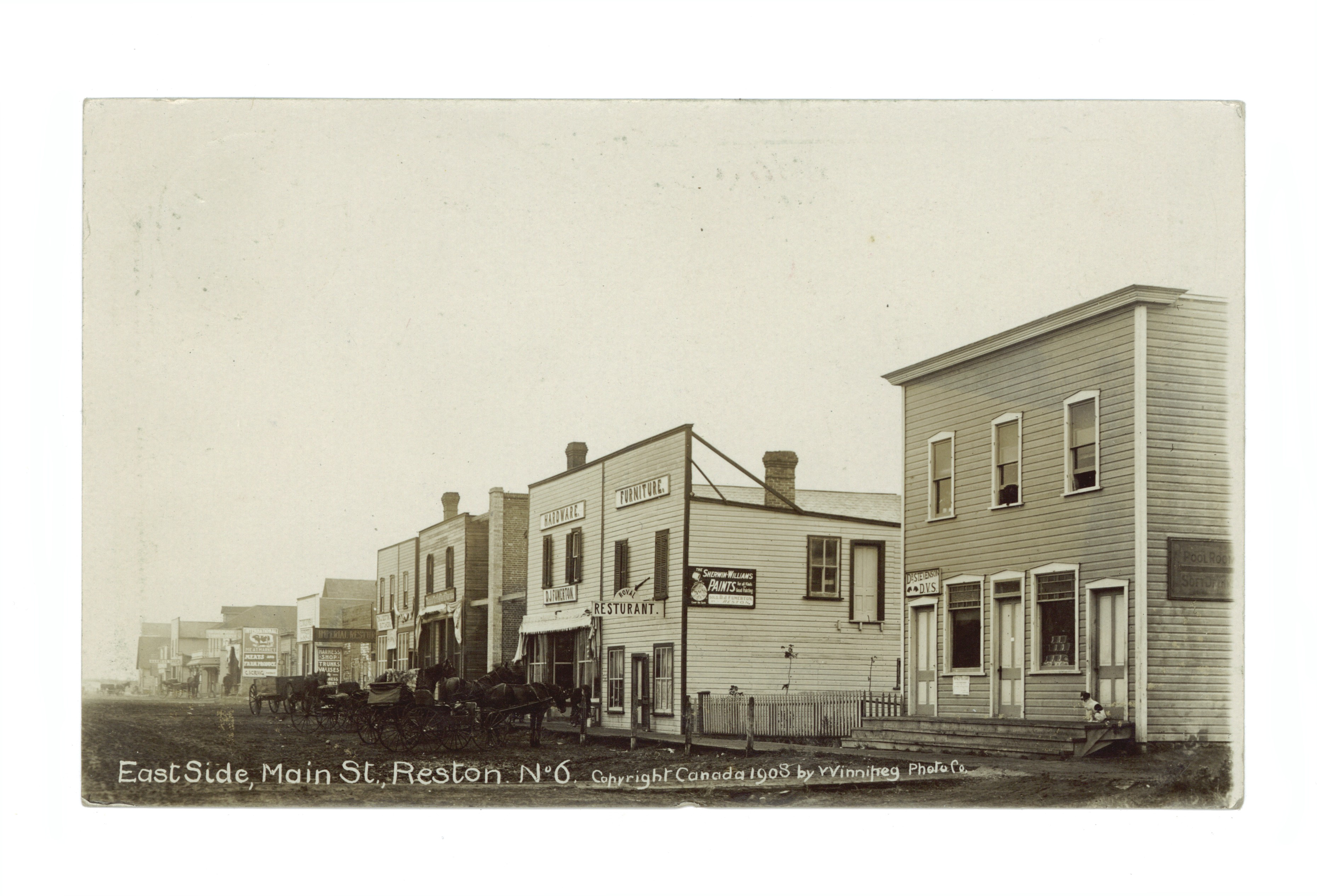
Main Street, 1909

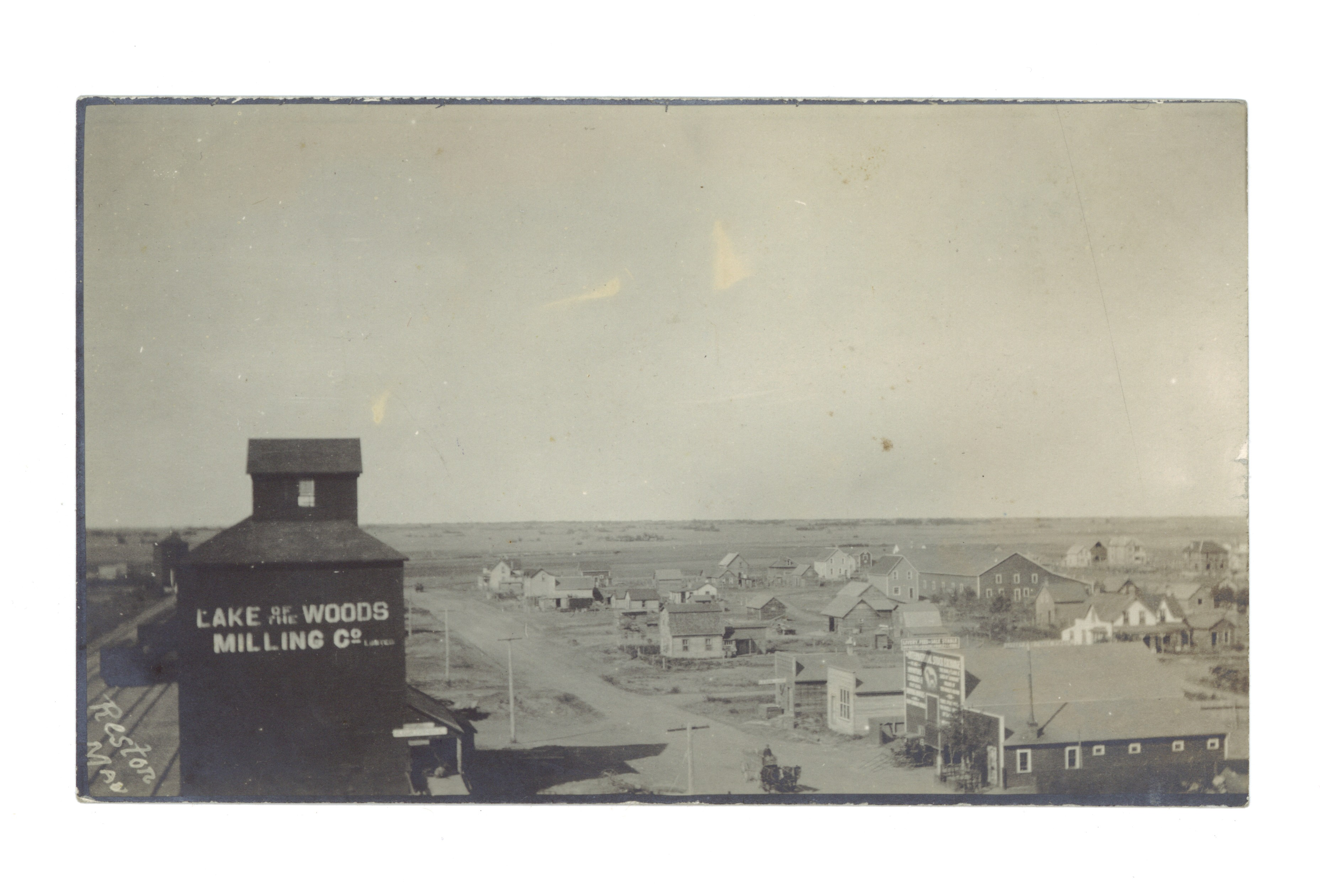
Reston, c. 1920

== Reston Memorial Park ==
The site for Reston Memorial Park is purchased in 1921, Work on the memorial was supervized by Alf Archer. The War Memorial was erected in Reston Memorial Park and was unveiled by Sir James Aikins, Lieutenant Governor of Manitoba, on June 30, 1922. The Reston War Memorial was erected in commemoration of the 23 fallen soldiers and 143 total enlistees from Reston during WW1. In 1956 bronze plaques were added to the memorial, Inscribed in the plaques on one side are the names of the 23 fallen soldiers from WW1 and on the other side are the names of the 17 fallen soldiers from WW2. The memorial is made up of Italian marble and topped by the figure of a Canadian soldier. The cost of the statue was $3,600.

== Reston Lake ==
In September 2018, The RM of Pipestone approved the construction of a man-made lake in Reston. The project was estimated to cost roughly $340,000; the lake officially opened June 15, 2019. In 2020 the community added a floating dock and waterslide on the lake costing an additional $25,000.

== Demographics ==
In the 2021 Census of Population conducted by Statistics Canada, Reston had a population of 659 living in 305 of its 336 total private dwellings, a change of 15.8% from its 2016 population of 569. With a land area of 5.32 km^{2} (2.05 sq mi), it had a population density of 123.9/km^{2} (320.8/sq mi) in 2021.

== Arts and culture ==
Reston was featured during season 3 of the CBC program Still Standing. The episode originally aired on August 8, 2017.
