= Pipestone, Manitoba =

Community in Manitoba, Canada

Pipestone
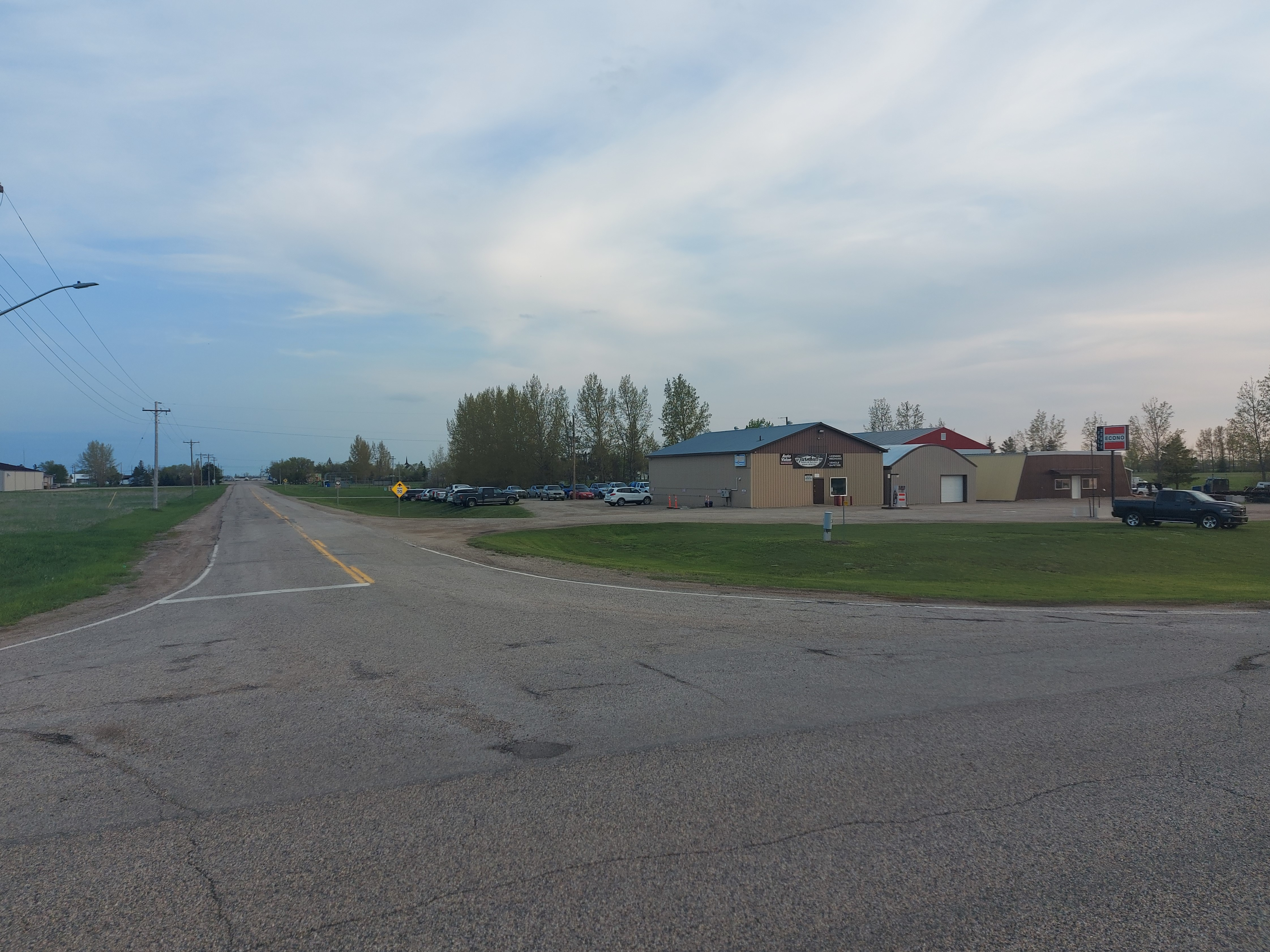
- Pipestone, Manitoba

- Location of Pipestone in Manitoba Pipestone (Canada)
- Coordinates: 49°33′28″N 100°56′44″W
- Country: Canada
- Province: Manitoba
- Region: Westman Region
- Census Division: No. 6

Government
  - Governing Body: Rural Municipality of Pipestone Council
  - MP: Grant Jackson
  - MLA: Greg Nesbitt

Population (2006 Census)
  - Total: 1,458
- Time zone: UTC−6 (CST)
  - Summer (DST): UTC−5 (CDT)
- Postal Code: R0M 1T0
- Area code: 204
- NTS Map: 062F10
- GNBC Code: GAVTR

Pipestone is a community in southwestern Manitoba, Canada. Located at the corner of Highways 2 and 83, Pipestone is approximately 35 kilometres (22 mi) from either Virden or Melita, approximately 70 kilometres (43 mi) to the United States border and approximately 36 kilometres (22 mi) to the Saskatchewan border. It is mainly an agricultural area with some oil drilling nearby. Pipestone is part of the Rural Municipality of Pipestone.

== History ==
More than 100,000 litres (22,000 imp gal; 26,000 US gal) of oil seeped into farmland near Pipestone as a result of a broken pipe in January 2012.

== 2007 tornado ==
A very large, violent, multi-vortex tornado touched down in Pipestone on June 23, 2007. This tornado was officially rated F3, and was a part of the same outbreak as the 2007 Elie tornado. This tornado did not hit anything of note, nor were there any fatalities.

== Notable people ==
Pipestone was the birthplace of John Hamilton Roberts, who commanded the landing forces in the Dieppe Raid in 1942.

== See also ==
- List of communities in Manitoba
- Pipestone Creek (Saskatchewan)
