= Pipestone Creek (Saskatchewan) =

River in Western Canada

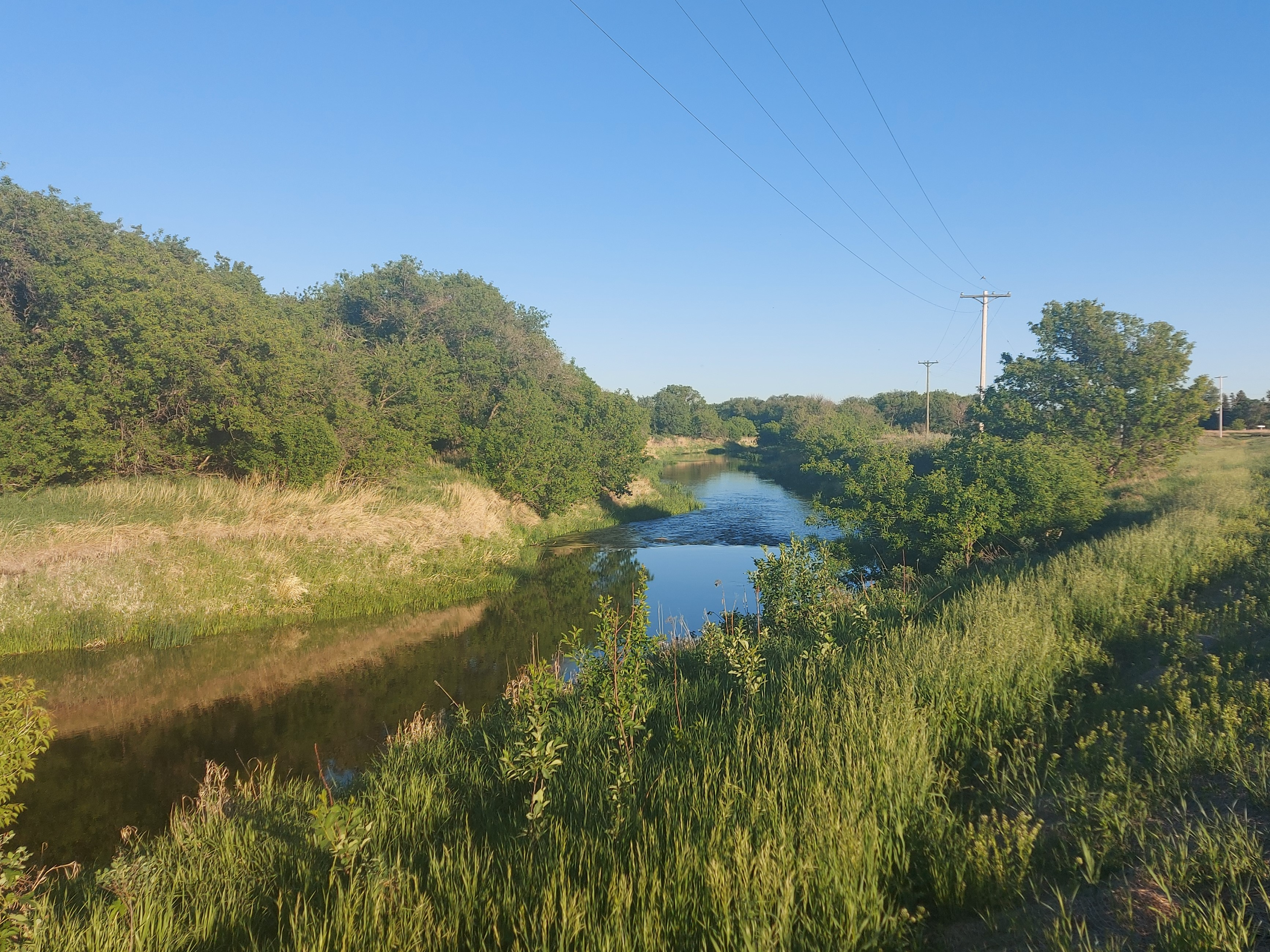
- Pipestone Creek near Cromer, Manitoba

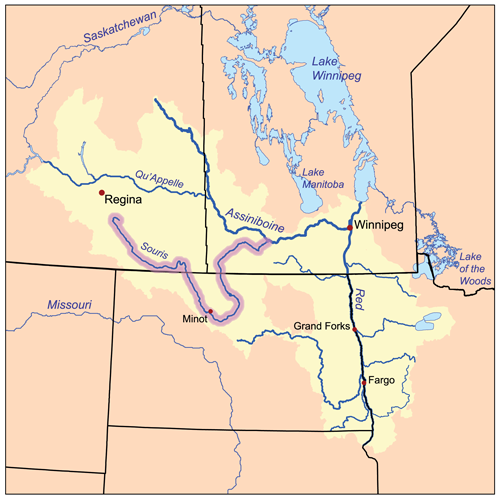
- The Red River drainage basin, with the Souris River highlighted

Location
- Countries: Canada
- Provinces: Manitoba; Saskatchewan
- Communities: Ochapowace Nation, SK; Saint Hubert Mission, SK; Kola, MB; Butler, MB; Cromer, MB; Oak Lake Reserve, MB

Physical characteristics
- Source: South of Grenfell
  - location: Saskatchewan
- Mouth: Oak Lake
  - location: Manitoba, Canada
  - elevation: 426 m (1,398 ft)
- Basin size: 2,242 km^{2} (866 sq mi)

Basin features
- River system: Red River drainage basin
- Tributaries
  - left: Little Pipestone Creek
  - right: Montgomery Creek

Pipestone Creek is a river in the Souris River watershed. Its flow begins in southeastern Saskatchewan, just south of the town of Grenfell and travels in a southeasterly direction into Manitoba in the Westman Region where it empties into Oak Lake through the Oak Lake Marsh.

The Pipestone Creek is in a region called the Prairie Pothole Region of North America, which extends throughout three Canadian provinces and five U.S. states. It is also within Palliser's Triangle. The topographical basin of Pipestone Creek's watershed ranges from 804 to 426 metres above sea level (asl), with a mean elevation of 650 asl.

"The Pothole Region is the result of the last Pleistocene glaciation and it is estimated that there are between 5 and 8 million wetlands or small depressions, which have an important biological role and impact on the ecosystem. It is estimated that the Pipestone Creek has a GDA (Gross Drainage Area) and EDA (Effective Drainage Area) of 2,242 km^{2} (866 sq mi) and 559 km^{2} (216 sq mi), respectively, and that near 11% of the watershed is covered by wetlands."

Most of the waters that flow into the Pipestone Creek depend upon rains and melting snow. There are no large natural lakes in its watershed. Saskatchewan and Manitoba have waterflow agreements regulating how much water Saskatchewan must allow to flow down Pipestone Creek into Manitoba. Saskatchewan has always met its requirements. Pipestone Creek and nearby Stony Creek are the two main tributaries to Oak Lake Aquifer, which is an important source of water in south-west Manitoba.

== Course ==
The Pipestone Creek follows the path of the Pipestone Spillway, which is a valley that was created during the melting of the last glaciation about 15,000 years ago. The headwater for the spillway was glacial Lake Indian Head. From its headwaters, the creek travels in a south-easterly direction and flows through Ochapowace Nation then into Pipestone Lake, a man-made lake with an earthen dam. From there it winds its way past St. Hubert Mission, an early French colony. South of the town of Moosomin, Saskatchewan, the creek flows into another man-made lake, Moosomin Lake. Moosomin Dam, owned and operated by the Saskatchewan Water Security Agency, is also an earthen dam that was completed in 1955. From Moosomin Lake, the creek continues south-east where is crosses the border into Manitoba. Just across the border, the creek winds past Kola and Butler on its way to Cromer. From Cromer, it continues in a more southerly direction until it nears Reston where it heads east towards the communities of Pipestone and Oak Lake Indian Reserve. From there it heads north-east through Oak Lake Marsh and into Oak Lake through the Pipestone Creek Diversion. Oak Lake flows into the Plum Lakes which flow into the Souris River via the Plum Creek.

=== Tributaries ===
- Montgomery Creek, starts in the Moose Mountain Upland near Highway 711 and flows due north past Kennedy and Highway 48 until it meets Pipestone Creek just downstream from Pipestone Lake.
- Little Pipestone Creek, starts in Moose Mountain Upland and flows in a generally eastward direction past Wawota and into the south-west corner of Moosomin Lake.

== Gallery ==
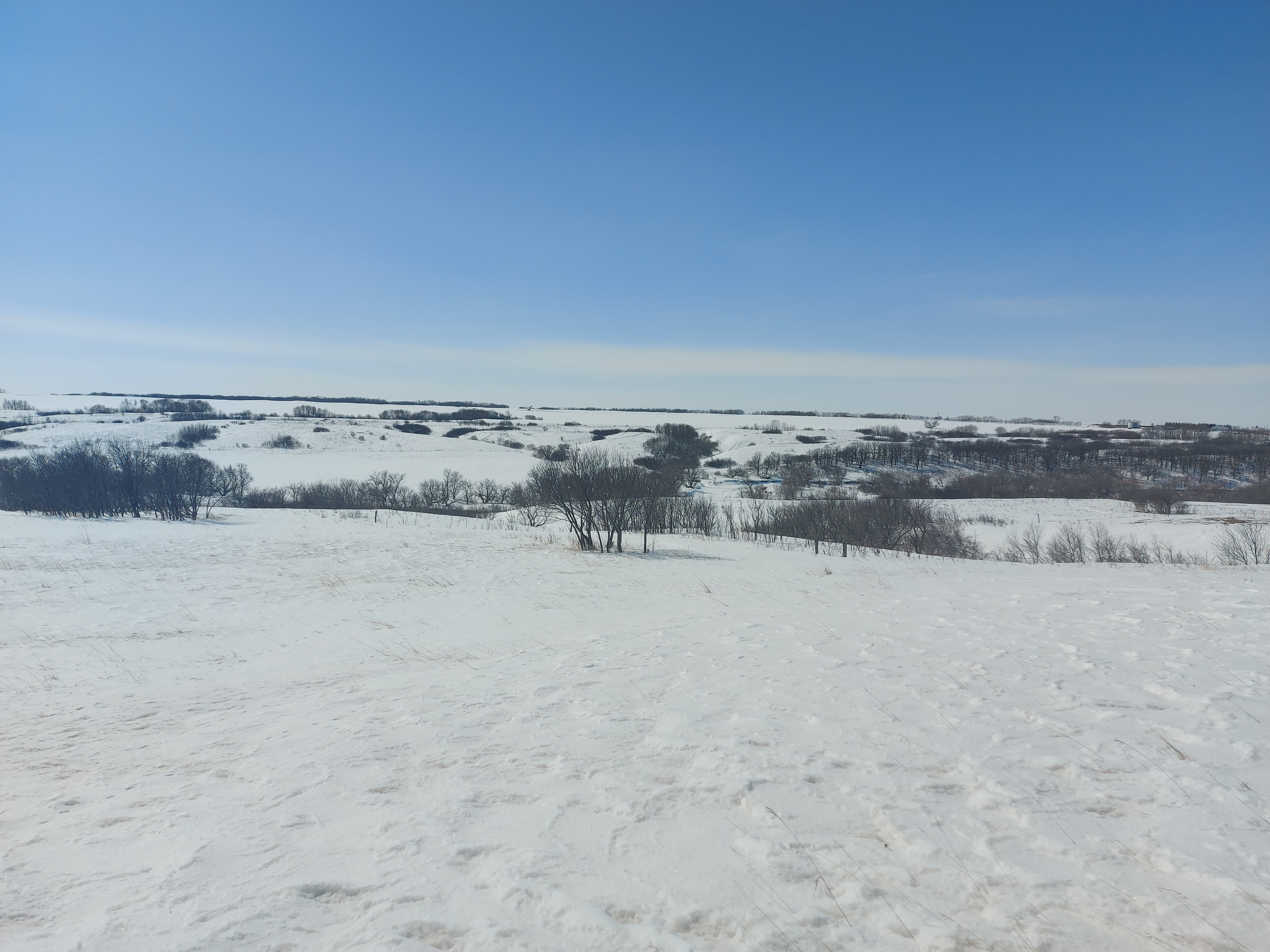
Pipestone Creek Valley in the RM of Pipestone.

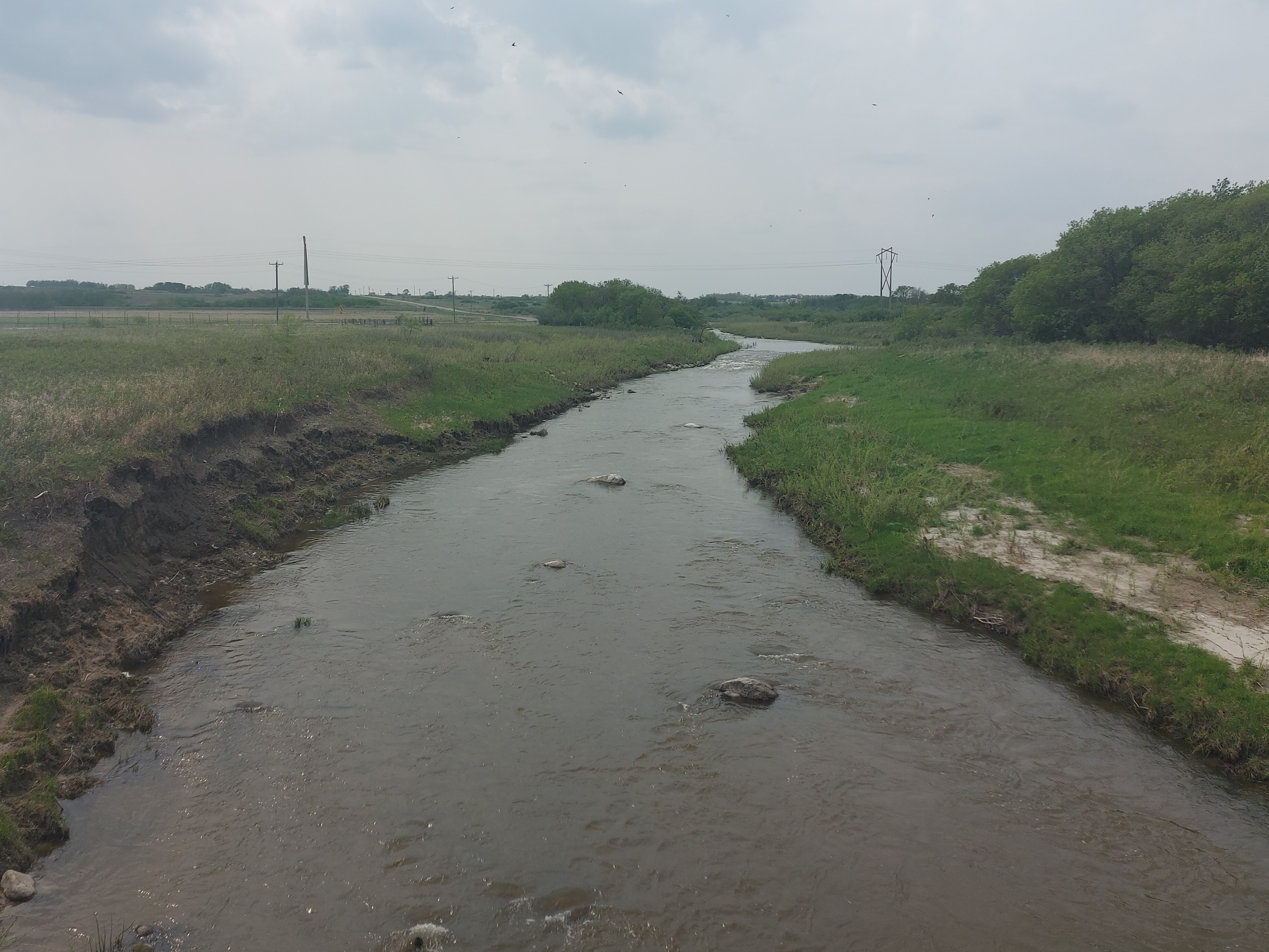
Pipestone Creek viewed from the bridge on Manitoba Provincial Road 256, near Cromer

== See also ==
- List of rivers of Saskatchewan
- List of rivers of Manitoba
- Moose Mountain Upland
