= Rural Municipality of Wallace =

Rural municipality in Manitoba, Canada

Coordinates: 49°55′51″N 101°09′38″W

The Rural Municipality of Wallace is a former rural municipality (RM) in the Canadian province of Manitoba. It was originally incorporated as a rural municipality on December 22, 1883. It ceased on January 1, 2015 as a result of its provincially mandated amalgamation with the RM of Woodworth and the Village of Elkhorn to form the Rural Municipality of Wallace – Woodworth.

The former RM surrounds the Town of Virden.

== Communities ==
- Hargrave
- Harmsworth
- Kirkella
- Kola
- Maples
- Two Creeks

== Reeves ==
Name	In Office
Adam Gerrond McDougall	1884–1887
James Findlay Frame	1888–1891
William M. Cushing	1892
Watson Montgomery Crosby	1893–1896
George A. Freeman	1897–1899
John Joslin	1900–1902
Amos Odell	1903–1904
Christopher Stinson	1905–1907
Charles E. Ivens	1908–1943
Harvey Cecil Odell	1944–1967
Maxwell James Edgar	1968–1983
Keith Kinnaird	1984–1992
Alex Gabrielle	1993–1997
Jim Penner	1998–2001
Vince Heaman	2002–2010
Richard Murphy	November 9, 2010 – August 9, 2011
Don Neufeld	August 2011 – dissolution
