= Adam Gerrond McDougall =

1st Reeve of The Rural Municipality of Wallace, Manitoba
- In office 1884–1885

Adam Gerrond McDougall (June 5, 1836 – April 29, 1907) served as the first reeve of the Rural Municipality of Wallace.

== Biography ==
McDougall was born at Gatehouse of Fleet, Kirkcudbrightshire, Scotland. His family moved to Liverpool where he completed his education at the Liverpool Collegiate Institution. He was employed for four years as a clerk in the British and North American Royal Mail Steam-Packet Company, which later became Cunard Line. He married Marian Laidlaw of Wavertree in October 1861.

McDougall emigrated to Seaforth, Ontario where he operated a general store and produce business for 17 years. While in business in Seaforth, McDougall was appointed and served as a Magistrate for Huron and Bruce counties. He married Nellie Jones of Seaforth February 5, 1879. McDougall's marriages produced 10 children.

In February 1882, McDougall moved to Manitoba and built the first house and store at what is now Virden. He also established a farm in south Virden. The Rural Municipality of Wallace incorporated in November, 1883, and McDougall was elected as the first Reeve. He served as Reeve for 2 years. McDougall also served as Secretary-Treasurer for the Town of Virden and the Dennis County Agricultural Society.

McDougall died in Virden on April 29, 1907.
