= Westman Region =

Region in Manitoba, Canada

Coordinates: 49°52′30″N 100°20′00″W

- Region of Manitoba
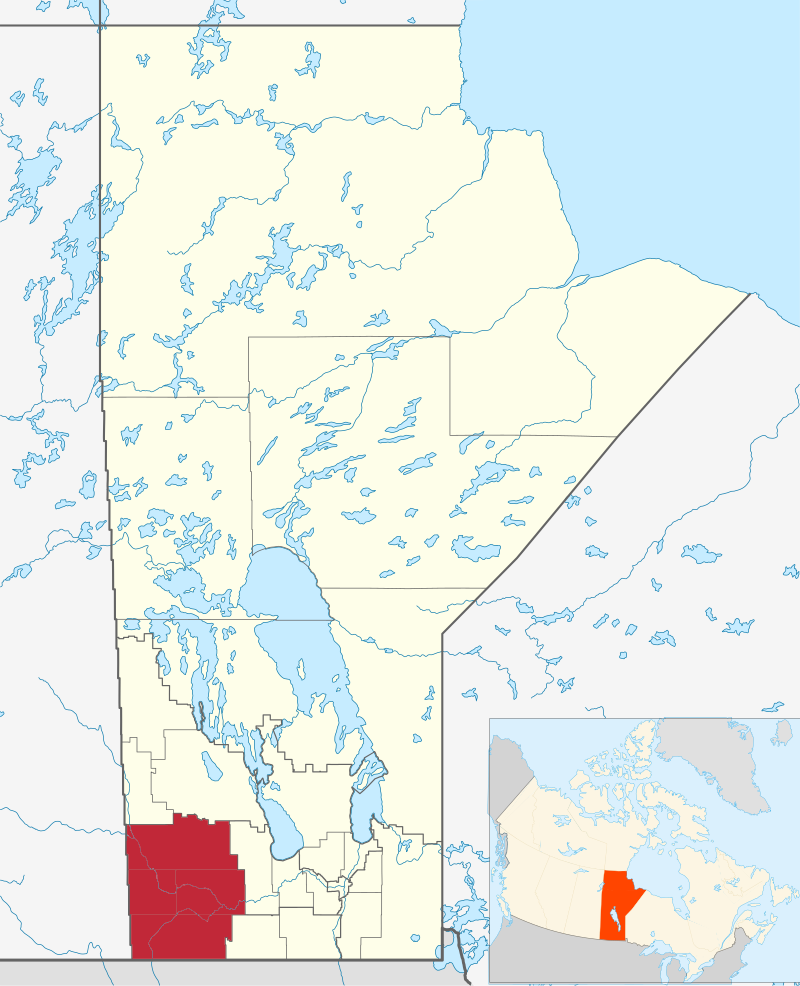
- Map of the Westman Region in Manitoba.
- Country: Canada
- Province: Manitoba

Area
  - Total: 27,384.24 km^{2} (10,573.11 sq mi)

Population (2021)
  - Total: 117,432
  - Density: 4.28831/km^{2} (11.1067/sq mi)

The Westman Region (also known as Western Manitoba or simply Westman) is an informal geographic region of the Canadian province of Manitoba located in the southwestern corner of the province.

The city of Brandon is the largest urban centre in the Westman Region. Primary economic industries in the region include agriculture, food processing, manufacturing, education, petroleum, transportation, and tourism. Riding Mountain National Park and eight provincial parks are located within Westman. As of 2021, the region had a recorded population of 117,432 people.

Together with the Parkland Region to the north, Westman composes the broader Prairie Mountain health region, and is provided healthcare services by Prairie Mountain Health.

== Major communities ==
=== Cities and towns ===
Name of Population Centre	Population (2021)	Status
Brandon	51,313	City
Carberry	1,818	Town
Melita	1,041	Town
Minnedosa	2,741	Town
Neepawa	5,685	Town
Virden	3,118	Town

=== Rural municipalities and unincorporated communities ===
Rural municipality	Unincorporated communities	Census division	Population (2021)
Boissevain–Morton	Boissevain**; Whitewater	5	2,309
Brenda–Waskada	Goodlands; Leighton; Medora; Napinka; Waskada	5	650
Clanwilliam–Erickson	Crocus; Erickson**; Hilltop; Kerrs Lake; Scandinavia	15	1,239
Cornwallis	Chater; Cottonwoods; Sprucewoods	7	4,568
Deloraine–Winchester	Deloraine**; Dand; Mountainside; Regent	5	1,478
Ellice–Archie	Chillon; Manson; McAuley; St. Lazare; Victor; Wattsview; Willen	15	831
Elton	Douglas; Forrest; Justice	7	1,276
Glenboro–South Cypress	Ashdown; Aweme; Glenboro**; Skalholt; Stockton; Treesbank	7	1,123
Grassland	Argue; Bunclody; Elgin; Fairfax; Hartney**; Grande-Clairière; Lauder; Minto; Regent; Underhill	5	1,583
Hamiota	Decker; Hamiota**; Lavinia; McConnell; Oakner; Pope	15	1234
Harrison Park	Crawford Park; Horod; Newdale; Onanole; Rackham; Rogers; Sandy Lake; Seech	15	1,852
Killarney–Turtle Mountain	Bannerman; Enterprise; Holmfield; Killarney**; Lena; Ninga^; Rhodes; Wakopa	5	3,429
Minto–Odanah	Bethany; Clanwilliam	15	1,121
North Cypress–Langford	Brookdale; Edrans; Fairview; Firdale; Gregg; Hallboro; Harte; Ingelow; Melbourne; Mentmore; Oberon; Wellwood	7 / 15	3,011
Oakland–Wawanesa	Carroll; Methven; Nesbitt; Rounthwaite; Wawanesa	7	1,758
Oakview	Brumlie; Basswood; Cardale; Norman; Oak River; Rapid City^	15	1,928
Pipestone	Butler; Cromer; Ebor; Ewart; Linklater; Pipestone; Reston^; Scarth; Sinclair; Woodnorth	6	1,422
Prairie Lakes	Belmont^; Dunrea; Hartney Junction; Hilton; Margaret; Ninette^	5	1,625
Prairie View	Arrow River; Beulah; Birtle**; Crandall; Foxwarren; Isabella; Miniota; Quadra; Reeder; Solsgirth; Uno	15	2,161
Riverdale	Bradwardine; Levine; Myra; Rivers**; Wheatland	7	1,803
Rosedale	Birnie; Eden; Franklin; Kelwood^; Mountain Road; Polonia; Riding Mountain	15	1,524
Sifton	Algar; Belleview; Deleau; Findlay; Griswold; Oak Lake**; Oak Lake Beach; Ralston; Routledge	6	1,239
Souris–Glenwood	Hayfield; Menteith; Newstead; Schwitzer; Souris**	7	2,547
Two Borders	Bede; Bernice; Broomhill; Coulter; Dalny; Elva; Lyleton; Pierson; Tilston	5	1,120
Wallace–Woodworth	Elkhorn^; Harding; Hargrave; Harmsworth; Kenton^; Kirkella; Kola; Lenore; Maples; Two Creeks	6	2,748
Whitehead	Alexander^; Ashbury; Beresford; Kemnay; Villette; Roseland	7	1,679
Yellowhead	Elphinstone; Glenforsa; Glossop; Ipswich; Kelloe; Menzie; Oakburn; Shoal Lake**; Strathclair	15	1,679

** Unincorporated Urban Community
^ Local Urban District

=== First Nations and reserves ===
- Birdtail Sioux First Nation
- Canupawakpa Dakota First Nation
- Gambler First Nation
- Keeseekoowenin Ojibway First Nation
- Rolling River First Nation
- Sioux Valley Dakota Nation
- Waywayseecappo First Nation

=== Canadian Forces ===
- CFB Shilo

== Points of interest ==
=== National parks ===
- Riding Mountain National Park

=== Provincial parks ===
- Criddle/Vane Homestead Provincial Park
- Grand Valley Provincial Park
- Oak Lake Provincial Park
- Rivers Provincial Park
- Seton Provincial Park
- Spruce Woods Provincial Park
- Turtle Mountain Provincial Park
- William Lake Provincial Park

=== Other parks ===
- International Peace Garden

== Transport ==
=== Airports ===
- Brandon Municipal Airport (primary)
- Deloraine Airport
- Erickson Municipal Airport
- Glenboro Airport
- Killarney Municipal Airport
- Melita Airport
- Minnedosa Airport
- Neepawa Airport
- Reston/R.M. of Pipestone Airport
- Riding Mountain Airport
- Shoal Lake Airport
- Shoal Lake Water Aerodrome
- Souris Glenwood Industrial Air Park
- Strathclair Airport
- Virden (Gabrielle Farm) Airport
- Virden/R.J. (Bob) Andrew Field Regional Aerodrome

=== Railways ===
- Rivers station (VIA Rail)

=== Highways ===
- PTH 1 (Trans-Canada Highway)
- PTH 2
- PTH 3
- PTH 5
- PTH 10
- PTH 16 (Yellowhead Highway)
- PTH 18
- PTH 21
- PTH 23
- PTH 41
- PTH 42
- PTH 45
- PTH 83
