= Rural Municipality of Pipestone =

Rural municipality in Manitoba, Canada

Pipestone
- Rural municipality
- Rural Municipality of Pipestone
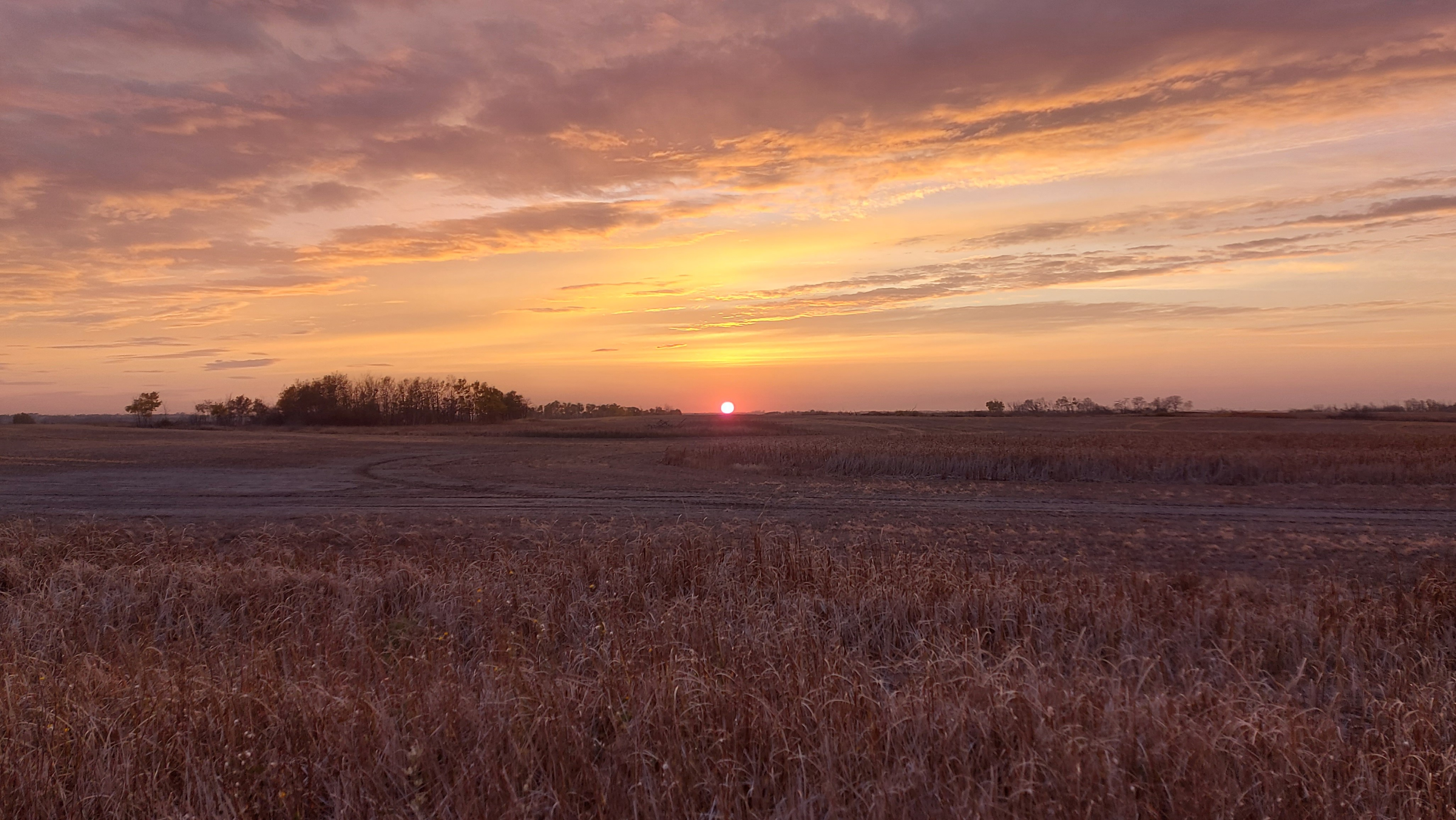
- An autumn sunset in a field in the RM of Pipestone

- Location of Pipestone in Manitoba
- Coordinates: 49°39′55″N 101°08′40″W
- Country: Canada
- Province: Manitoba
- Region: Westman

Population (2021)
  - Total: 1,422
- Time zone: UTC-6 (CST)
  - Summer (DST): UTC-5 (CDT)
- Website: rmofpipestone.com

Pipestone is a rural municipality (RM) in the southwestern part of the province of Manitoba in Western Canada

== Communities ==
- Butler
- Cromer
- Ebor
- Ewart
- Linklater
- Pipestone
- Reston
- Scarth
- Sinclair
- Woodnorth

== Demographics ==
In the 2021 Census of Population conducted by Statistics Canada, Pipestone had a population of 1,422 living in 593 of its 677 total private dwellings, a change of −2.5% from its 2016 population of 1,458. With a land area of 1,149.86 km^{2} (443.96 sq mi), it had a population density of 1.2/km^{2} (3.2/sq mi) in 2021.

== See also ==
- Pipestone Creek
