= Rural Municipality of Whitewater =

Rural municipality in Manitoba, Canada

Coordinates: 49°26′37″N 100°06′17″W

The Rural Municipality of Whitewater is a former rural municipality (RM) in the Canadian province of Manitoba. It was originally incorporated as a rural municipality on December 22, 1883. It ceased on January 1, 2015, as a result of its provincially mandated amalgamation with the RM of Cameron and the Town of Hartney to form the Municipality of Grassland.

== Communities ==
- Elgin
- Fairfax
- Minto
- Regent
- Bunclody
