= Rural Municipality of Elton =

Rural municipality in Manitoba, Canada

Elton
- Rural municipality
- Rural Municipality of Elton
- Location of Elton in Manitoba
- Coordinates: 49°58′30″N 99°51′57″W
- Country: Canada
- Province: Manitoba
- Region: Westman
- Incorporated: 1883

Area
  - Total: 570.97 km^{2} (220.45 sq mi)

Population (2021)
  - Total: 1,276
  - Density: 2.235/km^{2} (5.788/sq mi)
- Time zone: UTC-6 (CST)
  - Summer (DST): UTC-5 (CDT)
- Website: http://www.rmofelton.ca/

Elton is a rural municipality in the Canadian province of Manitoba, located to the north of the city of Brandon. The community was incorporated in 1883, and its first officials took office the following year.

Its population in 2001 was 1,321.

== Communities ==
- Douglas
- Forrest
- Justice

== Demographics ==
In the 2021 Census of Population conducted by Statistics Canada, Elton had a population of 1,276 living in 468 of its 503 total private dwellings, a change of 0.2% from its 2016 population of 1,273. With a land area of 576.14 km^{2} (222.45 sq mi), it had a population density of 2.2/km^{2} (5.7/sq mi) in 2021.
