= Grant Jackson (politician) =

Canadian politician

Grant Jackson MP

Member of Parliament for Brandon—Souris
- Incumbent
- Assumed office April 28, 2025
- Preceded by: Larry Maguire

Member of the Legislative Assembly of Manitoba for Spruce Woods
- In office October 3, 2023 – March 24, 2025
- Preceded by: Cliff Cullen
- Succeeded by: Colleen Robbins

Personal details
- Born: 1996 (age 29–30) Souris, Manitoba, Canada
- Party: Conservative
- Other political affiliations: Progressive Conservative
- Education: Brandon University (BA)

Grant Jackson MP (born 1997) is a Canadian politician, who currently serves as a Conservative Party of Canada Member of Parliament for the riding Brandon—Souris, having been elected in the 2025 federal election. Jackson previously served in the Legislative Assembly of Manitoba, having been elected at the 2023 Manitoba general election to represent the district of Spruce Woods as a member of the Progressive Conservative Party of Manitoba.

Jackson graduated with a Bachelor of Arts degree from Brandon University. He previously worked for Larry Maguire, the Member of Parliament for Brandon—Souris, his predecessor.

On October 24, 2023, he was appointed as the Shadow Minister for Manitoba Hydro and as the Shadow Minister for the Public Utilities Board. On March 24, 2025, Jackson resigned his Legislative Assembly seat in order to run federally.

== Electoral record ==
2025 Canadian federal election: Brandon—Souris
Party	Candidate	Votes	%	±%	Expenditures
Conservative	Grant Jackson	28,624	62.19	+2.82	
Liberal	Ghazanfar Ali Tarar	10,766	23.39	+11.45	
New Democratic	Quentin Robinson	6,637	14.42	−5.97	
Total valid votes/expense limit		46,027	99.19		
Total rejected ballots		376	0.81		
Turnout		46,403	69.56		
Eligible voters		66,710			
Conservative notional hold		Swing		−4.32	
Source: Elections Canada
Note: number of eligible voters does not include voting day registrations.

2023 Manitoba general election: Spruce Woods
Party	Candidate	Votes	%	±%	Expenditures
Progressive Conservative	Grant Jackson	4,986	61.81	-6.26	$13,312.67
New Democratic	Melissa Ghidoni	1,936	24.00	+8.13	$168.00
Liberal	Michelle Budiwski	1,145	14.19	+7.98	$6,413.47
Total valid votes/expense limit		8,067	99.23	–	$56,314.00
Total rejected and declined ballots		63	0.77	+0.24	
Turnout		8,130	56.54	-0.21	
Eligible voters		14,379			
Progressive Conservative hold		Swing		-7.19	
Source(s) Source: Elections Manitoba
