= Greg Nesbitt =

Canadian politician

Greg Nesbitt MLA

Minister of Natural Resources and Northern Development
- In office June 9, 2022 – October 18, 2023
- Premier: Heather Stefanson
- Preceded by: Alan Lagimodiere
- Succeeded by: Jamie Moses

Member of the Legislative Assembly of Manitoba for Riding Mountain
- Incumbent
- Assumed office April 19, 2016
- Preceded by: Leanne Rowat

Personal details
- Born: December 7, 1957 (age 68)
- Party: Progressive Conservative

Greg Nesbitt is a Canadian provincial politician, who was elected as the Member of the Legislative Assembly of Manitoba for the riding of Riding Mountain in the 2016 election. He is a member of the Progressive Conservative party, and held the seat after incumbent MLA Leanne Rowat did not stand for re-election. He was re-elected in the 2019 and 2023 elections. On October 24, 2023, he was appointed as the Shadow Minister for Environment and Climate Change and the Shadow Minister for Efficiency Manitoba.

In May 2025, Nesbitt apologized for suggesting that a mental health contract for workers who had searched a landfill for victims of the 2022 Winnipeg serial killings was for NDP Finance Minister Adrien Sala's personal use.

== Electoral record ==
2016 Manitoba general election: Riding Mountain
Party	Candidate	Votes	%	±%	Expenditures
Progressive Conservative	Greg Nesbitt	5,311	68.80	10.34	$12,173.26
Liberal	Jordan Fleury	1,028	13.32	9.76	$2,702.78
Green	Mark Olenick	779	10.09	6.60	$0.00
New Democratic	Béla Gyarmati	601	7.79	-26.69	$146.90
Total valid votes		7,719	–	–	
Rejected		93	–		
Eligible voters / turnout		14,075	55.50	1.49	
Source(s) Source: Manitoba. Chief Electoral Officer (2016). Statement of Votes for the 41st Provincial General Election, April 19, 2016 (PDF) (Report). Winnipeg: Elections Manitoba. "Election Returns: 41st General Election". Elections Manitoba. 2016.

2019 Manitoba general election: Riding Mountain
Party	Candidate	Votes	%	±%	Expenditures
Progressive Conservative	Greg Nesbitt	6,126	65.91	-2.89	$3,171.65
New Democratic	Wayne Chacun	1,970	21.20	13.41	$7,438.18
Green	Mary Lowe	726	7.81	-2.28	$0.00
Liberal	Jordan Fleury	472	5.08	-8.24	$0.00
Total valid votes		9,294	–	–	
Rejected		46	–		
Eligible voters / turnout		16,761	55.72	0.22	
Source(s) Source: Manitoba. Chief Electoral Officer (2019). Statement of Votes for the 42nd Provincial General Election, September 10, 2019 (PDF) (Report). Winnipeg: Elections Manitoba. "Candidate Election Returns". Elections Manitoba. Elections Manitoba.

2023 Manitoba general election: Riding Mountain
Party	Candidate	Votes	%	±%	Expenditures
Progressive Conservative	Greg Nesbitt	5,644	63.02	-2.89	$12,575.91
New Democratic	Wayne Chacun	2,895	32.32	+11.13	$4,259.75
Liberal	Eileen Smerchanski	417	4.66	-0.42	$0.00
Total valid votes/expense limit		8,956	99.16	–	$62,186.00
Total rejected and declined ballots		76	0.84	–	
Turnout		9,032	57.42	+1.69	
Eligible voters		15,730			
Progressive Conservative hold		Swing		-7.01	
Source(s) Source: Elections Manitoba
