= Division No. 6, Manitoba =

Census division in Canada

Coordinates: 49°48′N 100°57′W

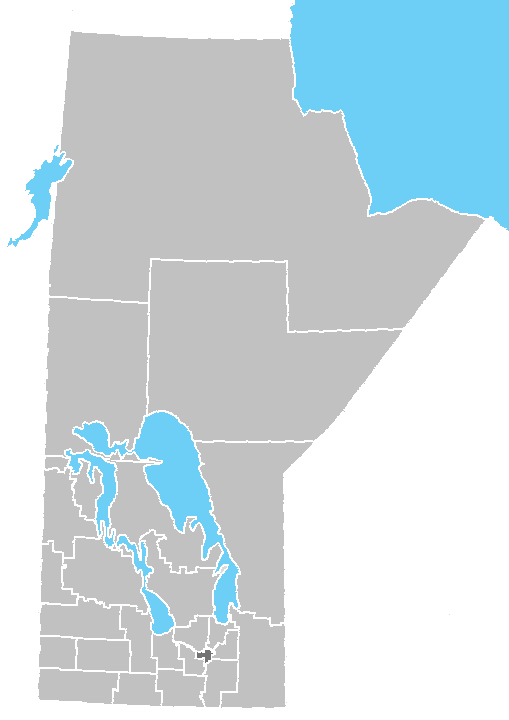

Division No. 6 (Virden) is a census division located within the Westman Region of south west Manitoba, Canada. Unlike in some other provinces, census divisions do not reflect the organization of local government in Manitoba. These areas exist solely for the purposes of statistical analysis and presentation; they have no government of their own.

Note that the Dakota have never signed a treaty in Canada. The major service centre for the area is the Town of Virden. The area population as of 2001 was 10,110. The economy of the area is mixed farming, livestock and crude oil production. Also included in the division are the Canupawakpa Dakota First Nation and the Sioux Valley First Nation.

== Demographics ==
In the 2021 Census of Population conducted by Statistics Canada, Division No. 6 had a population of 9,906 living in 3,965 of its 4,563 total private dwellings, a change of −4% from its 2016 population of 10,317. With a land area of 4,024.15 km^{2} (1,553.73 sq mi), it had a population density of 2.5/km^{2} (6.4/sq mi) in 2021.

== Towns ==
- Virden

== Unincorporated communities ==
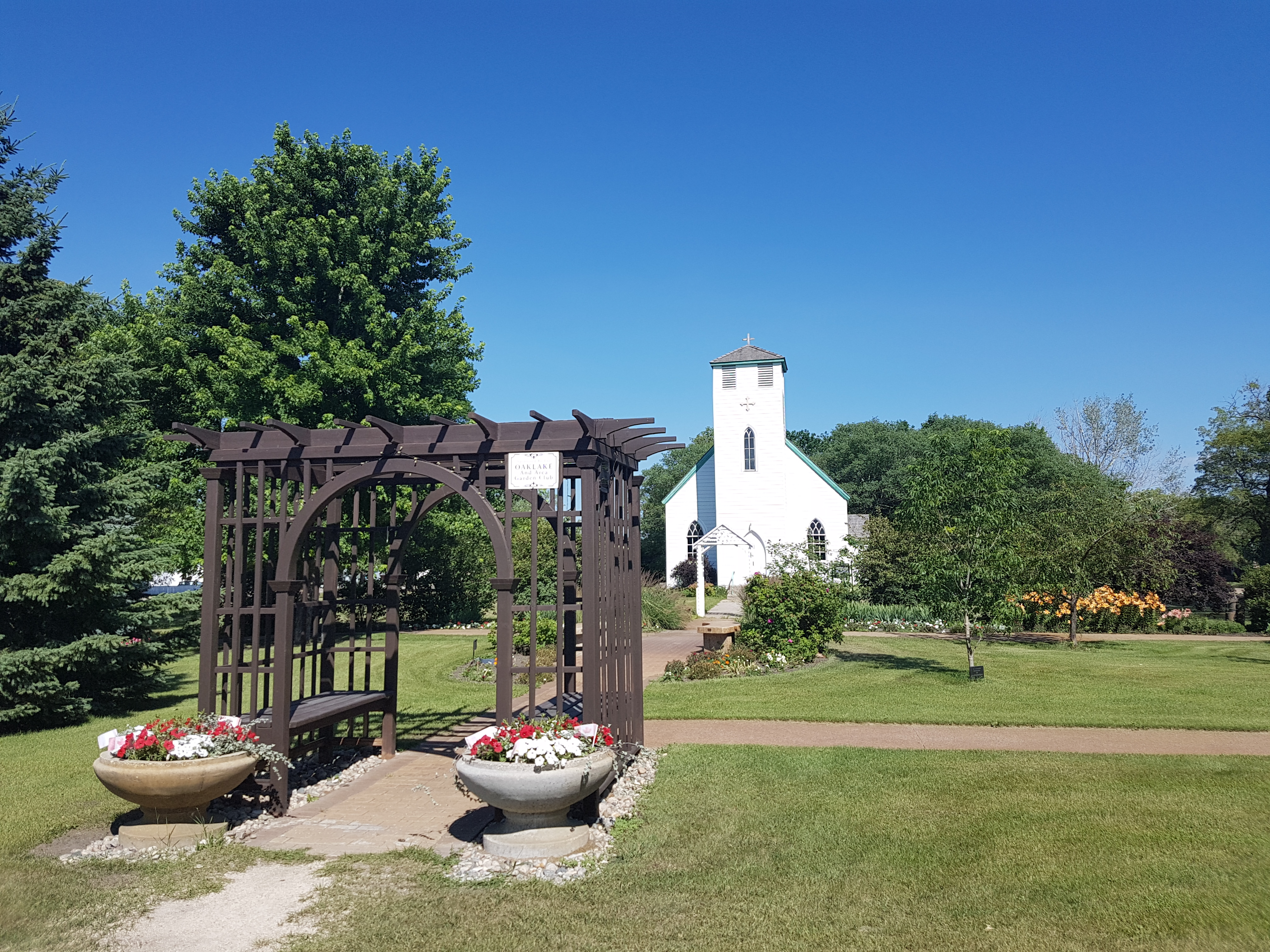
Church and gardens in Oak Lake

- Elkhorn
- Oak Lake

== Rural municipalities ==
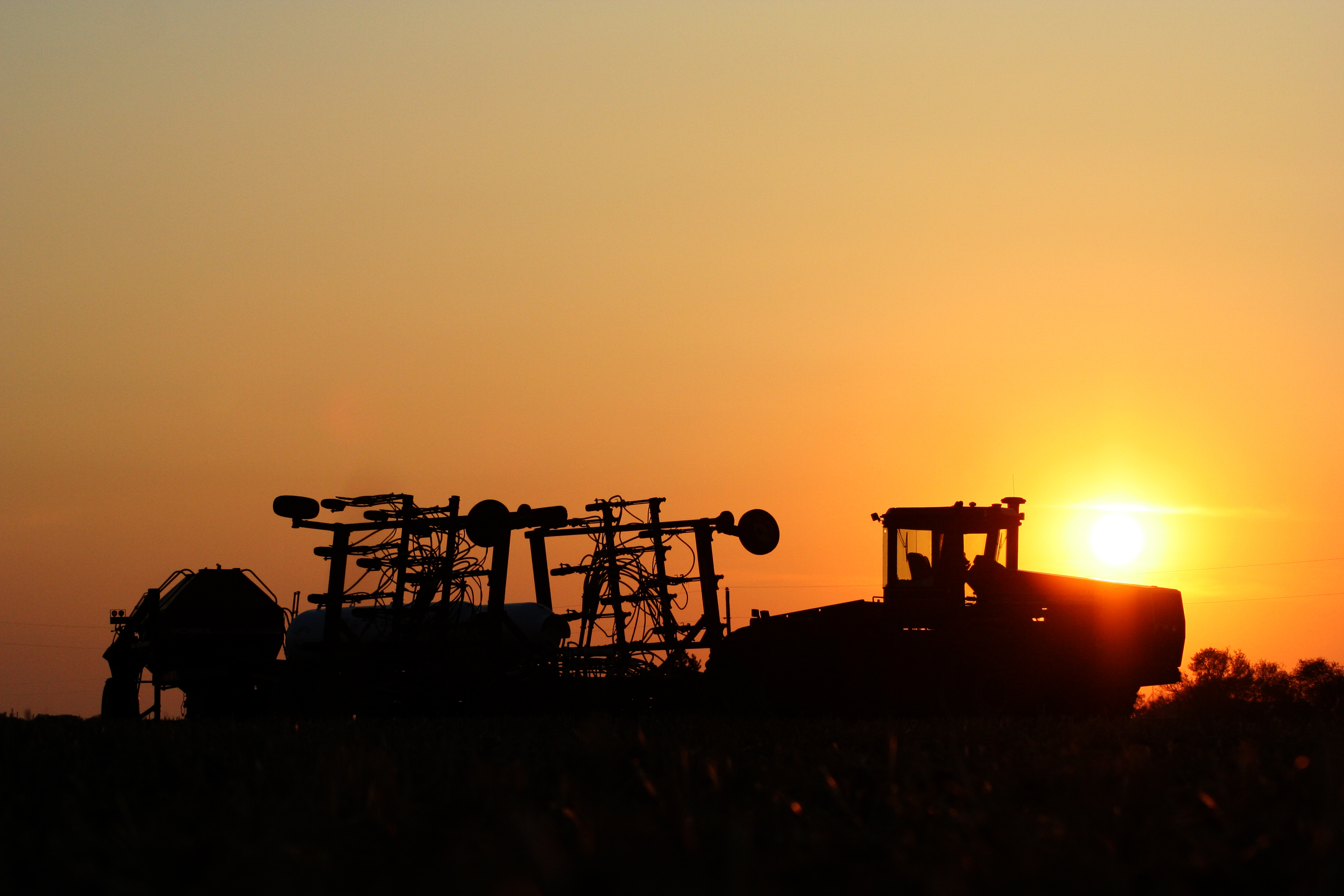
Rural Municipality of Wallace – Woodworth

- Pipestone
- Sifton
- Wallace – Woodworth

== First Nations ==
- Canupawakpa Dakota First Nation
- Sioux Valley Dakota Nation
