= Manitoba Provincial Road 251 =

Provincial Road in Manitoba, Canada

Provincial Road 251
- PR 250 highlighted in red
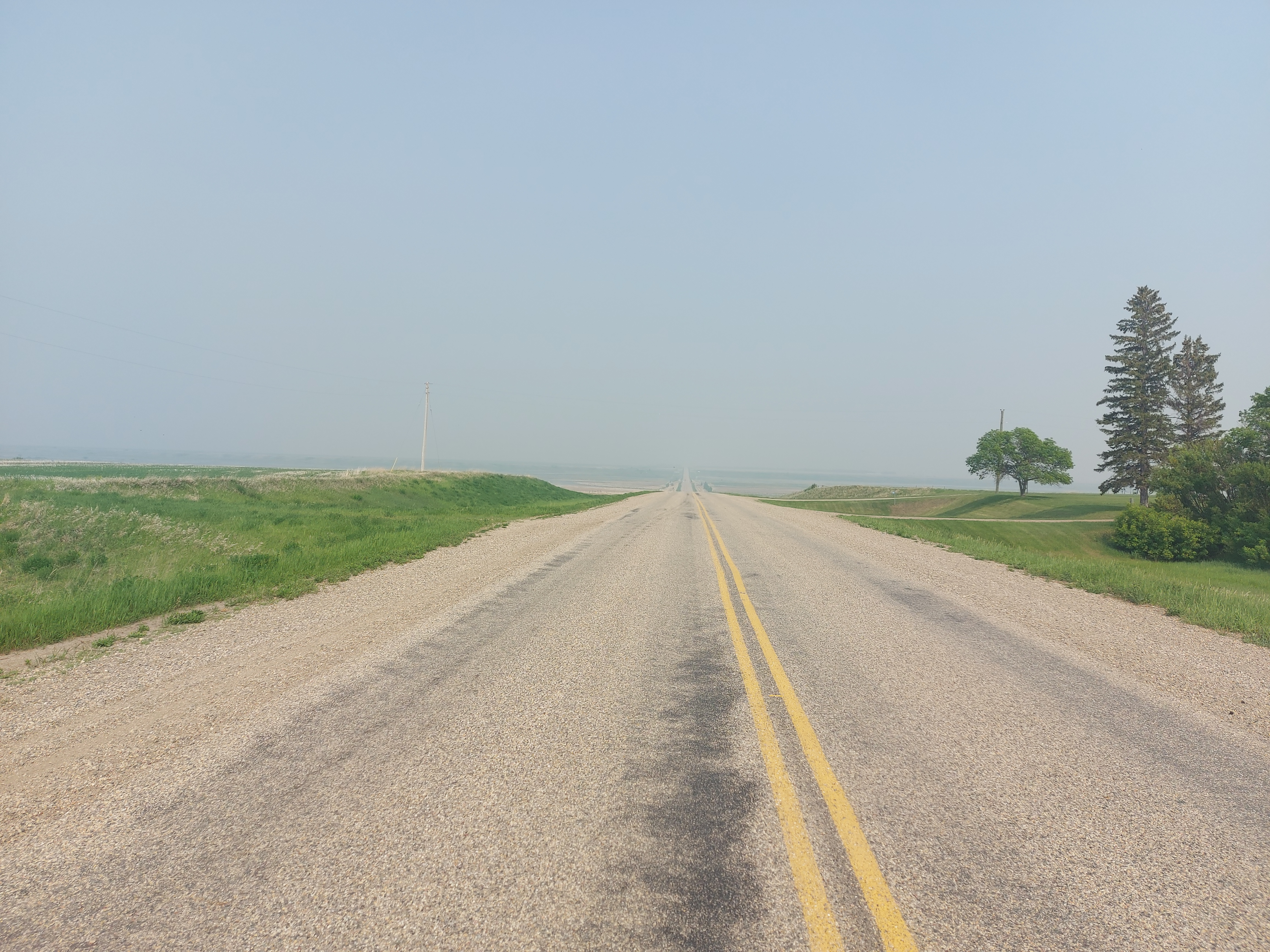
- PR 251 descending into the Souris River Valley

Route information
- Maintained by Department of Infrastructure
- Length: 55.7 km (34.6 mi)
- Existed: 1966–present

Major junctions
- West end: PR 256 near the Antler-Lyleton Border Crossing
- PTH 83 near Coulter; PR 452 in Waskada; PR 254 near Goodlands
- East end: PTH 21 near Goodlands

Location
- Country: Canada
- Province: Manitoba
- Rural municipalities: Two Borders, Brenda-Waskada, Deloraine-Winchester

Highway system
- Provincial highways in Manitoba; Winnipeg City Routes
← PR 250	→ PR 252

Provincial Road 251 (PR 251) is a 55.7-kilometre-long (34.6 mi) east–west highway in the Westman Region of Manitoba. It serves as the primary road access to the hamlets of Lyleton, Coulter, Waskada, and Goodlands in the very southwest corner of the province.

== Route description ==
PR 251 begins in the Municipality of Two Borders at an intersection with PR 256, 10 kilometres (6.2 mi) north of the Antler-Lyleton Border Crossing. It heads east through rural areas for several kilometres, passing through the Lyleton community along Railway Avenue before joining Provincial Trunk Highway 83 (PTH 83) in a short concurrency (overlap). The highway now crosses the Antler River and travels past the Linear Mounds National Historic Site before passing through the hamlet of Coulter and crossing the Souris River.

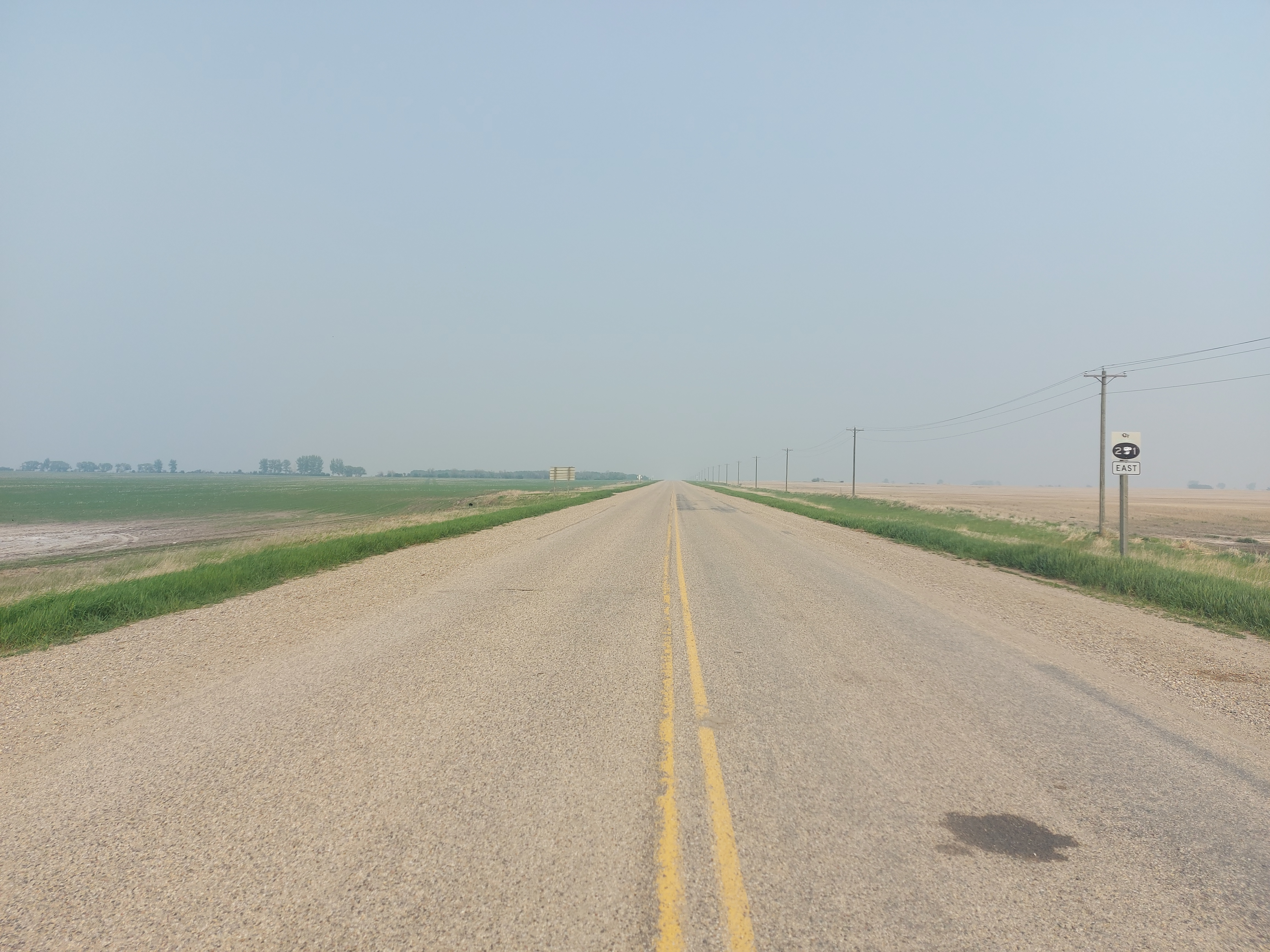
Manitoba Highway 251 East at the junction with Highway 83

PR 251 enters the Municipality of Brenda-Waskada after several kilometres of rural farmland, immediately making a sharp left turn as it enters the town of Waskada. It travels through the centre of town along Park Street, clipping the western edge of downtown at an intersection with Railway Avenue. After passing through neighbourhoods, the highway makes a sharp right at a junction with PR 452 before leaving Waskada and continuing east through rural farmland. PR 251 has an intersection with the southern end of PR 254 and travels along the northern edge of Goodlands before coming to an end along the border with the Municipality of Deloraine-Winchester at an intersection with PTH 21. The entire length of PR 251 is a paved, two-lane highway.

== Major intersections ==
Division	Location	km	mi	Destinations	Notes
Two Borders		0.0	0.0	PR 256 – Antler-Lyleton Border Crossing, Antler, ND, Pierson	Western terminus
Two Borders		14.7	9.1	PTH 83 south – Westhope-Coulter Border Crossing, Westhope, ND	Western end of PTH 83 concurrency
Two Borders		18.0	11.2	PTH 83 north – Melita	Eastern end of PTH 83 concurrency
Two Borders		20.8	12.9	Bridge over the Antler River	
Two Borders		21.3	13.2	Road 158W – Linear Mounds National Historic Site	
Two Borders		25.3– 25.4	15.7– 15.8	Bridge over the Souris River	
Two Borders		27.9	17.3	Road 154W – Dalny	Former PR 458 north
Brenda-Waskada	Waskada	37.7	23.4	PR 452 north – Melita	Southern terminus of PR 452
Brenda-Waskada		45.9	28.5	PR 254 north – Medora	Southern terminus of PR 254
Brenda-Waskada		52.5	32.6	Road 140W – Goodlands	
Brenda-Waskada – Deloraine-Winchester boundary		55.7	34.6	PTH 21 – Carbury-Goodlands Border Crossing, Bottineau, ND, Deloraine	Eastern terminus; road continues as Road 7N
1.000 mi = 1.609 km; 1.000 km = 0.621 mi: Concurrency terminus
