= Manitoba Provincial Road 254 =

Provincial Road in Manitoba, Canada

Provincial Road 254
- PR 254 highlighted in red

Route information
- Maintained by Department of Infrastructure
- Length: 118.7 km (73.8 mi)
- Existed: 1966–present

Major junctions
- South end: PR 251 near Goodlands
- PTH 3 in Medora; PTH 2 near Deleau; PTH 1 (TCH) in Oak Lake
- North end: PR 259 near Virden

Location
- Country: Canada
- Province: Manitoba
- Rural municipalities: Brenda-Waskada, Grassland, Sifton, Wallace-Woodworth

Highway system
- Provincial highways in Manitoba; Winnipeg City Routes
← PR 253	→ PR 255

Provincial Road 254 (PR 254) is a 118.7-kilometre-long (73.8 mi) north–south highway in the Westman Region of Manitoba. It connects the communities of Medora, Lauder, Grande-Clairière, Oak Lake Beach, and the town of Oak Lake. It also provides access to Oak Lake and Oak Lake Provincial Park. PR 254 does cross bridges over both the Souris River and the Assiniboine River. Besides two short paved sections, one in downtown Medora and the other being between Oak Lake Beach and the Trans-Canada Highway, the highway is entirely an unpaved two-lane gravel road.

== Route description ==
PR 254 begins in the Municipality of Brenda-Waskada at an intersection with PR 251 just east of Goodlands. It heads north as an unpaved gravel road, going through a switchback before travelling through Medora along Third Street, where it crosses a small creek, a railroad, and has a short concurrency (overlap) with PTH 3 (Boundary Commission Trail). Entering the Municipality of Grassland, the highway travels past the community of Lauder before a junction with PR 345. PR 254 now makes a sharp left turn to travel just north of the Maple Grove Colony and cross the Souris River. It now winds its way back and forth as it traverses the Lauder Sand Hills and passes through Grande-Clairière, where it makes a sharp turn to the north at an intersection with PR 541.

Entering the Rural Municipality of Sifton, PR 254 intersects PTH 2 (Red Coat Trail) just west of Deleau before traversing marshland to an intersection with PR 543. Shortly thereafter, it makes a sharp left turn to enter the town of Oak Lake Beach, travelling past Oak Lake Provincial Park to make a sharp right turn to follow along the coastline of Oak Lake. Now a paved two-lane highway, the highway passes by Cherry Point to an intersection with PR 255 and run concurrently with PTH 1 (Trans-Canada Highway) for a few kilometres to the town of Oak Lake, where it turns north as a gravel road to again through farmland for several kilometres to cross the Assiniboine River into the Rural Municipality of Wallace-Woodworth. Continuing through rural farmland, PR 254 makes a sharp left turn at an intersection with PR 463, before heading west through a switchback and coming to an end at an intersection with PR 259 just a few kilometres east of Virden.

== History ==
Provincial Road 264
- Location: Crandall–Cracknell
- Length: 119.2 km (74.1 mi)
- Existed: 1992–present

Prior to 1992, PR 254 continued for an additional 148.4 kilometres (92.2 mi) northward, following a short concurrency with PR 259 past Lenore before splitting off and following what is now Road 67N and Road 145W to Crandall. From there, it followed the entirety of what is now PR 264.

== Major intersections ==
Division	Location	km	mi	Destinations	Notes
Brenda-Waskada		0.0	0.0	PR 251 – Goodlands, Waskada	Southern terminus; road continues south as Road 144W
Brenda-Waskada	Medora	16.9	10.5	PTH 3 east (Boundary Commission Trail) – Deloraine	Southern end of PTH 3 concurrency
Brenda-Waskada	Medora	17.3	10.7	PTH 3 west (Boundary Commission Trail) – Melita	Northern end of PTH 3 concurrency
Brenda-Waskada		25.2	15.7	Road 22N – Napinka	Former PR 447 west
Grassland		31.7	19.7	Railway Avenue – Lauder	
Grassland		33.4	20.8	PR 345 – Tilston, Hartney	
Grassland		37.0– 37.1	23.0– 23.1	Bridge over the Souris River	
Grassland		55.8	34.7	PR 541 east – Hartney	Western terminus of PR 541
Sifton		64.2	39.9	PTH 2 (Red Coat Trail) – Weyburn, Souris	
Sifton		73.9	45.9	PR 543 east	Western terminus of PR 543
Sifton	Oak Lake Beach	81.9	50.9	Oak Lake Provincial Park	Access road into park; southern end of paved section
Sifton		84.6	52.6	Cherry Point Road – Cherry Point	
Sifton		87.0	54.1	PR 255 west – Scarth	Eastern terminus of PR 255
Sifton		92.2	57.3	PTH 1 (TCH) west – Virden	Southern end of PTH 1 concurrency
Sifton	Oak Lake	97.4	60.5	PTH 1 (TCH) east – Brandon; Oxcart Trail – Oak Lake	Northern end of PTH 1 concurrency; northern end of paved section
Sifton–Wallace-Woodworth boundary		100.1– 100.2	62.2– 62.3	Bridge over the Assiniboine River	
Wallace-Woodworth		108.8	67.6	PR 463 east – Griswold	Western terminus of PR 463
Wallace-Woodworth		118.7	73.8	PR 259 – Virden, Lenore	Northern terminus
1.000 mi = 1.609 km; 1.000 km = 0.621 mi: Concurrency terminus
