= Manitoba Provincial Road 452 =

Provincial Road in Manitoba, Canada

Provincial Road 452

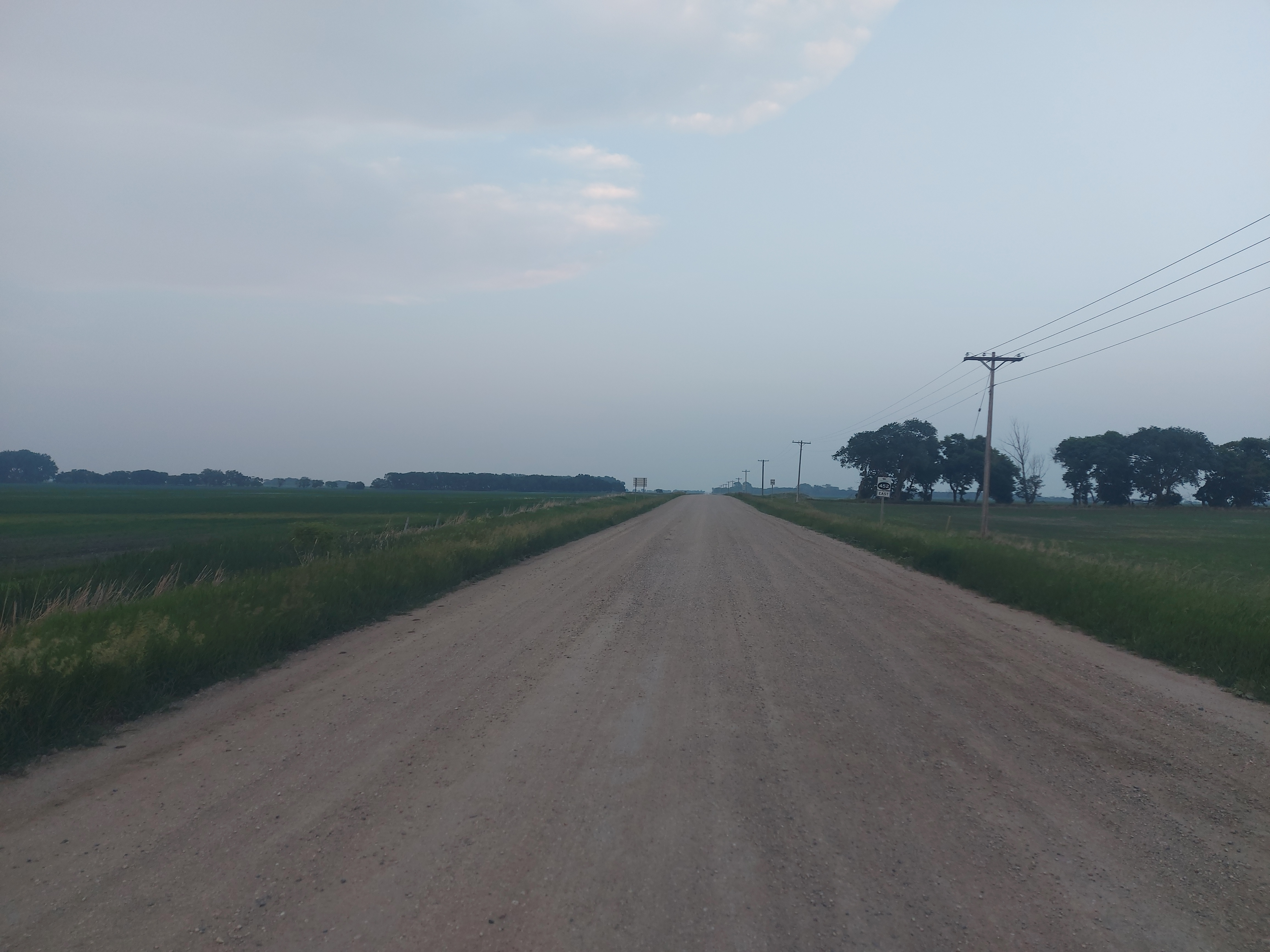
- Provincial Road 452

Route information
- Maintained by Department of Infrastructure
- Length: 36.4 km (22.6 mi)
- Existed: 1966–present

Major junctions
- South end: PR 251 in Waskada
- PTH 3 near Napinka
- North end: PTH 83 near Melita

Location
- Country: Canada
- Province: Manitoba
- Rural municipalities: Brenda-Waskada, Two Borders

Highway system
- Provincial highways in Manitoba; Winnipeg City Routes
← PR 450	→ PR 453

Provincial Road 452 (PR 452) is a 36.4-kilometre-long (22.6 mi) north–south highway in the Westman Region of Manitoba. It connects the towns of Waskada and Napinka with both the Boundary Commission Trail (PTH 3) and PTH 83.

== Route description ==
PR 452 begins in the Municipality of Brenda-Waskada at an intersection with PR 251 on the northern end of Waskada, with the road continuing south into downtown as Park Street. It heads due north out of town as a paved two-lane highway, travelling through farmland and rural areas for several kilometres. After joining PTH 3 (Boundary Commission Trail) westbound, the two run concurrently for 3.3 kilometres (2.1 mi) before turning north along the border with the Municipality of Two Borders, bouncing back and forth between asphalt and gravel sections to enter Napinka at a railway crossing. The highway has an intersection with Railway Avenue, which leads into downtown, before becoming fully paved again as it makes a sharp left turn at an intersection with Dufferin Avenue (former PR 447 eastbound, leads to PR 254). Leaving town, PR 452 crosses a bridge over the Souris River before turning to gravel and heading due west through rural farmland, coming to an end shortly thereafter at an intersection with PTH 83, just north of Melita.

== History ==
Provincial Road 447
- Road 22N, Dufferin Avenue
- Location: Napinka
- Length: 19.2 km (11.9 mi)
- Existed: 1966–1992

Prior to 1992, PR 452's northern terminus was in Napinka at the intersection between Dufferin Avenue and Road 22N, which at that time was designated as Provincial Road 447 (PR 447), a 19.2-kilometre-long (11.9 mi) east-west highway stretching from PTH 83 north of Melita, through Napinka, to PR 254 several kilometres to the east. PR 452's section between PTH 3 and Napinka was still fully paved at this time. When PR 447 was decommissioned in 1992, PR 452 was extended along the former's section between Napinka and PTH 83. PR 452's original length was 28.1 kilometres (17.5 mi).

== Major intersections ==
Division	Location	km	mi	Destinations	Notes
Brenda-Waskada	Waskada	0.0	0.0	PR 251 (Park Street / Road 7N) – Waskada, Goodlands	Southern terminus; southern end of paved section
Brenda-Waskada		18.2	11.3	PTH 3 east (Boundary Commission Trail) – Medora	Southern end of PTH 3 concurrency
Brenda-Waskada–Two Borders boundary		21.5	13.4	PTH 3 west (Boundary Commission Trail) – Melita	Northern end of PTH 3 concurrency; northern end of paved section
Brenda-Waskada–Two Borders boundary	Napinka	27.3	17.0	Railway Avenue – Napinka	
Brenda-Waskada–Two Borders boundary	Napinka	28.1	17.5	Dufferin Avenue (Road 22N) – Napinka	Former PR 447 east; southern end of paved section
Two Borders		29.1– 29.2	18.1– 18.1	Bridge over the Souris River	
Two Borders		29.2	18.1	Northern end of paved section	
Two Borders		36.4	22.6	PTH 83 – Melita, Virden	Northern terminus; road continues west as Road 22N
1.000 mi = 1.609 km; 1.000 km = 0.621 mi
