= Manitoba Provincial Road 252 =

Provincial road in Manitoba, Canada

Provincial Road 252
- PR 200 highlighted in red
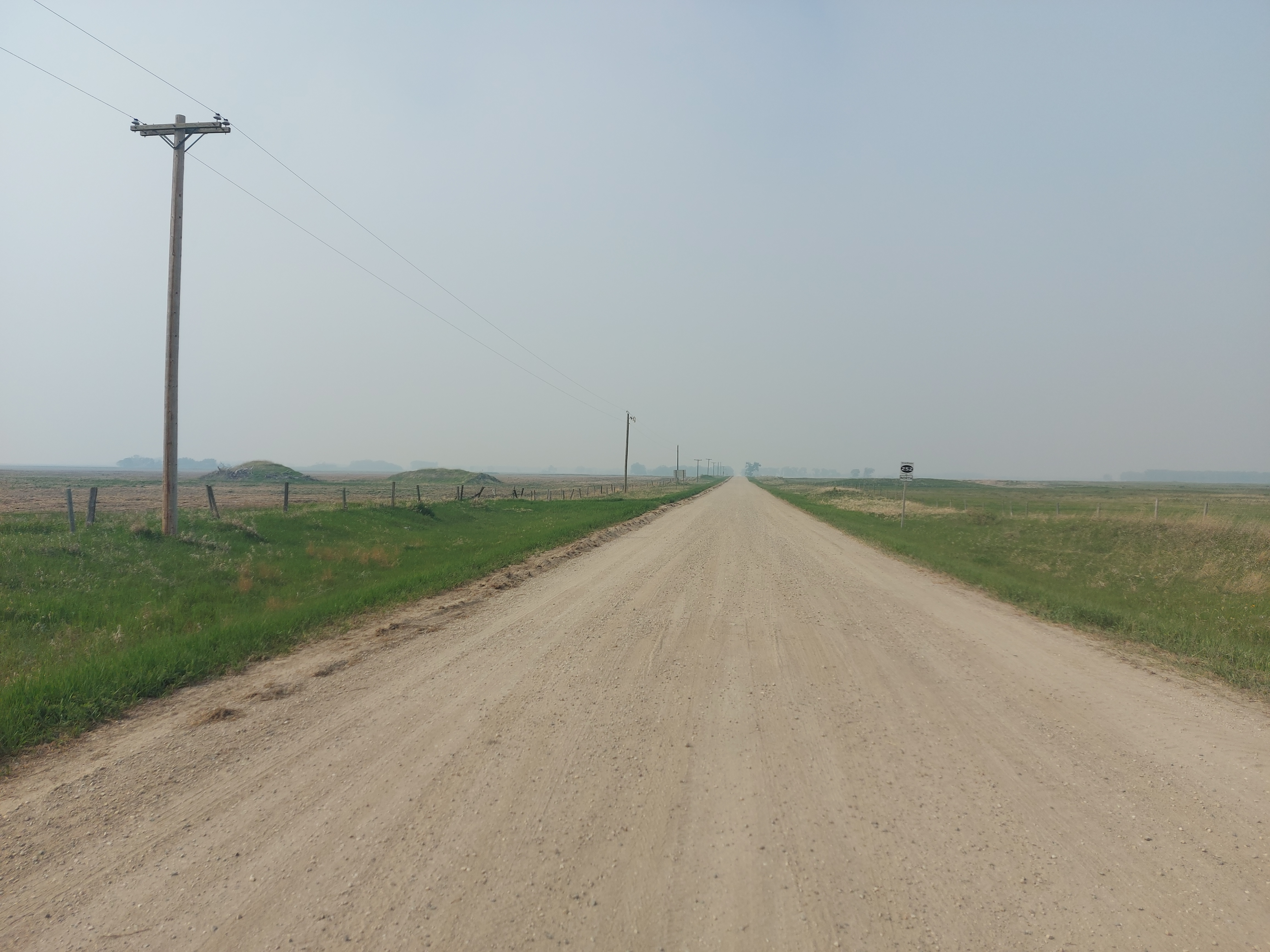
- Provincial Road 252 at its southern terminus

Route information
- Maintained by Department of Infrastructure
- Length: 24.7 km (15.3 mi)
- Existed: 1966–present

Major junctions
- South end: PTH 3 near Elva
- PR 445 near Melita
- North end: PR 345 near Broomhill

Location
- Country: Canada
- Province: Manitoba
- Rural municipalities: Two Borders

Highway system
- Provincial highways in Manitoba; Winnipeg City Routes
← PR 251	→ PR 253

Provincial Road 252 (PR 252) is a 24.7-kilometre-long (15.3 mi) north-south gravel road in the Westman Region of Manitoba. Located entirely in the Municipality of Two Borders, it serves as the primary road access to the community of Elva, as well as a connection to Broomhill for PTH 3 (Boundary Commission Trail).

== Route description ==
PR 252 begins at an intersection with PTH 3 (Boundary Commission Trail) roughly halfway between Pierson and Melita. It heads due north to cross a railway line and travel through the western side of the community of Elva. The highway continues north through rural farmland for several kilometres to cross PR 445 before coming to an end at a junction with PR 345, 2.0 kilometres (1.2 mi) west of Broomhill. The entire length of Manitoba Provincial Road 252 is a two-lane gravel road.

== History ==
Prior to 1992, PR 252 continued north for an additional 61.8 kilometres (38.4 mi), following short concurrencies with PR 345 west of Broomhill and PTH 2 (Red Coat Trail) in Reston, it crossed Pipestone Creek before traveling through Woodnorth to have intersections with PR 255 and PR 257 before coming to an end at an intersection with PTH 1 (Trans-Canada Highway) at Hargrave. This section was a two-lane gravel road as well, travelling through the Rural Municipalities of Pipestone and Rural Municipality of Wallace-Woodworth.

== Major intersections ==
Division	Location	km	mi	Destinations	Notes
Two Borders		0.0	0.0	PTH 3 (Boundary Commission Trail) – Pierson, Melita	Southern terminus
Two Borders	Elva	4.2	2.6	Railway Avenue – Elva	
Two Borders	Elva	4.4	2.7	McRae Avenue – Elva	
Two Borders		9.9	6.2	PR 445 – Melita	
Two Borders		24.7	15.3	PR 345 – Tilston, Lauder	Northern terminus
1.000 mi = 1.609 km; 1.000 km = 0.621 mi
