= Manitoba Provincial Road 256 =

Provincial road in Manitoba, Canada

Provincial Road 256
- PR 256 highlighted in red

Route information
- Maintained by Department of Infrastructure
- Length: 164.5 km (102.2 mi)
- Existed: 1966–present

Major junctions
- North end: ND 256 at the U.S. border near Lyleton
- PTH 3 at Pierson; PTH 2 near Sinclair; PTH 1 (TCH) at Elkhorn
- South end: PTH 41 near McAuley

Location
- Country: Canada
- Province: Manitoba
- Rural municipalities: Ellice – Archie; Pipestone; Two Borders; Wallace – Woodworth

Highway system
- Provincial highways in Manitoba; Winnipeg City Routes
← PR 255	→ PR 257

Provincial Road 256 (PR 256) is a provincial road in the southwest corner of the Canadian province of Manitoba. At a length of 164.5 kilometres (102.2 mi), it is among the longer provincial roads in Manitoba.

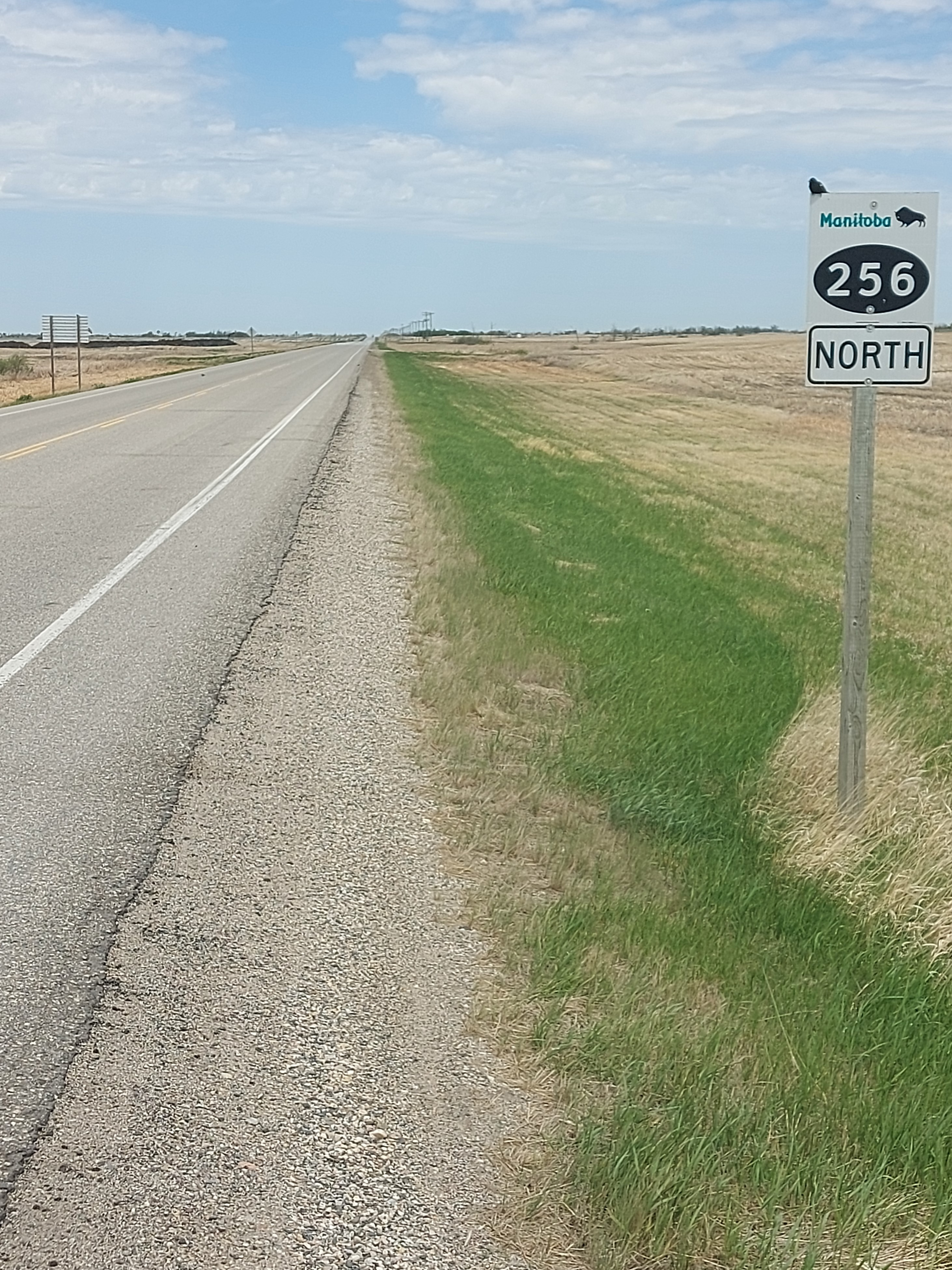
Road 256 marker, 17 km south of Cromer at the intersection of 256 and Highway 2

PR 256 begins as a gravel road at PTH 41 near McAuley and winds its way south, staying within 16 kilometres (10 mi) of the Saskatchewan border. After it crosses the Trans-Canada Highway at Elkhorn, PR 256 becomes a paved, two-lane highway and continues south to the Lyleton Port of Entry at the Antler–Lyleton Border Crossing on the Canada–United States border, located south of Pierson, in the extreme southwest corner of Manitoba.

After crossing the international border, PR 256 becomes North Dakota Highway 256 (ND 256).

In 2014, the Canada Border Services Agency moved into a new state-of-the-art facility at Lyleton, which is the most westerly Port of Entry into Manitoba, located only three miles from the Saskatchewan boundary.

== Major intersections ==
Division	Location	km	mi	Destinations	Notes
Two Borders		0.0	0.0	ND 256 south – Antler	Antler-Lyleton Border Crossing; southern terminus; continuation south into North Dakota
Two Borders		5.0	3.1	Road 3N	Former PR 251 west
Two Borders		9.8	6.1	PR 251 east – Lyleton	Western terminus of PR 251
Two Borders		12.3	7.6	Bridge over Gainsborough Creek	
Two Borders	Pierson	23.0	14.3	Government Road Allowance – Pierson	
Two Borders	Pierson	23.2	14.4	PTH 3 east (Boundary Commission Trail) – Melita	Southern end of PTH 3 concurrency
Two Borders	Pierson	23.8	14.8	PTH 3 west (Boundary Commission Trail) – Estevan; Railway Avenue – Pierson	Northern end of PTH 3 concurrency
Two Borders		33.2	20.6	PR 445 east – Melita	Western terminus of PR 445
Two Borders		44.3	27.5	Bridge over Jackson Creek	
Two Borders		48.0	29.8	PR 345 east – Lauder	Southern end of PR 345 concurrency
Two Borders		49.7	30.9	Bridge over Jackson Creek	
Two Borders		51.3	31.9	PR 345 west – Tilston	Northern end of PR 345 concurrency
Two Borders		56.6	35.2	Bridge over Jackson Creek	
Pipestone	Sinclair	70.6	43.9	Railway Avenue – Sinclair	
Pipestone	Sinclair	71.5	44.4	PTH 2 west (Red Coat Trail) – Weyburn	Southern end of PTH 2 concurrency
Pipestone	Sinclair	72.3	44.9	Road 168W – Sinclair	
Pipestone		75.6	47.0	PTH 2 east (Red Coat Trail) – Reston	Northern end of PTH 2 concurrency
Pipestone	Cromer	93.5	58.1	PR 255 west – Ebor	Southern end of PR 255 concurrency
Pipestone	Cromer	93.6	58.2	Bridge over Pipestone Creek	
Pipestone	Cromer	93.8	58.3	PR 255 east – Woodnorth	Northern end of PR 255 concurrency
Wallace-Woodworth		105.1	65.3	PR 257 – Kola, Virden	
Wallace-Woodworth	Elkhorn	121.0	75.2	PTH 1 (TCH) – Regina, Virden	Southern end of unpaved section
Wallace-Woodworth		141.4	87.9	PR 467 west – Manson	Southern end of PR 467 concurrency
Wallace-Woodworth	Willen	143.1	88.9	PR 467 east – Miniota	Northern end of PR 467 concurrency
Wallace-Woodworth	McAuley	164.5	102.2	PTH 41 – Kirkella, St. Lazare	Northern terminus; northern end of unpaved section; road continues as Railway Avenue
1.000 mi = 1.609 km; 1.000 km = 0.621 mi: Concurrency terminus; Route transition

== Related route ==
Provincial Road 445
- Road 18N
- Location: Melita
- Length: 19.2 km (11.9 mi)
- Existed: 1966–present

Provincial Road 445 (PR 445) is a 19.2-kilometre-long (11.9 mi) east-west spur of PR 256 in the Municipality of Two Borders, providing access to the town of Melita. It is entirely a paved two-lane highway, with no other settlements along the highway as it travels through rural farmland.

Prior to 1992, PR 445 continued west a further 9.9 kilometres (6.2 mi) past PR 256 along a gravel section of Road 18N to the Saskatchewan border, where it continued for a short distance as Township Road 40 to come to an end at an intersection with Saskatchewan Highway 600 (Hwy 600) between Fertile and Gainsborough.

Division	Location	km	mi	Destinations	Notes
Two Borders		−9.9	−6.2	Township Road 40 to Highway 600 – Fertile, Gainsborough	Former western terminus prior to 1992
Two Borders		0.0	0.0	PR 256 – Pierson, Tilston	Western terminus; road continues west as Road 18N
Two Borders		9.9	6.2	PR 252 – Broomhill, Elva	
Town of Melita		19.0	11.8	Front Street – Downtown	
Town of Melita		19.2	11.9	PTH 3 (Boundary Commission Trail) / PTH 83 – Minot, Pierson, Virden	Eastern terminus
1.000 mi = 1.609 km; 1.000 km = 0.621 mi: Closed/former
