= Manitoba Provincial Road 345 =

Provincial road in Manitoba, Canada

Provincial Road 345
- PR 345 highlighted in red

Route information
- Maintained by Manitoba Infrastructure
- Length: 65.6 km (40.8 mi)
- Existed: 1966–present

Major junctions
- West end: Highway 361 at the Saskatchewan provincial line
- PTH 83 in Bede
- East end: PTH 21 north of Dand

Location
- Country: Canada
- Province: Manitoba
- Rural municipalities: Two Borders, Grassland

Highway system
- Provincial highways in Manitoba; Winnipeg City Routes
← PR 344	→ PR 346

Provincial Road 345 (PR 345) is a west–east provincial road in southwestern Manitoba, Canada. The roadway is 65.6 kilometres (40.8 mi) long.

== Route description ==
The route begins by straddling the Saskatchewan border going north, before curving eastward into Manitoba. The route continues west as Saskatchewan Highway 361. The road is unpaved for its first 4.5 kilometres (2.8 mi) or so before becoming paved just west of Tilston. PR 345 traverses mainly rural areas between the Saskatchewan province line and PTH 21, while traversing the towns of Tilston, Broomhill, Bede, Bernice, and Lauder.

== Major intersections ==
Division	Location	km	mi	Destinations	Notes
Two Borders		0.0	0.0	Highway 361 west – Storthoaks, Alida	Continuation into Saskatchewan; western terminus
Two Borders		4.5	2.8	Pavement begins	
Two Borders	Tilston	7.0	4.3	Morris Street – Tilston	
Two Borders		7.9	4.9	PR 256 north – Sinclair	Western end of PR 256 concurrency
Two Borders		11.1	6.9	PR 256 south – Pierson	Eastern end of PR 256 concurrency
Two Borders		21.0	13.0	PR 252 south – Elva	Northern terminus of PR 252
Two Borders	Broomhill	22.7	14.1	Road 161W – Reston	Former PR 252 north
Two Borders	Broomhill	24.2	15.0	Main Street – Broomhill	
Two Borders	Bede	32.8	20.4	PTH 83 – Melita, Virden	
Grassland		52.4	32.6	PR 254 – Medora, Grande-Clairière	
Grassland		54.1	33.6	Railway Avenue – Lauder	
Grassland		65.6	40.8	PTH 21 – Hartney, Deloraine	Eastern terminus; road continues east as Road 27N
1.000 mi = 1.609 km; 1.000 km = 0.621 mi: Concurrency terminus
