= Graham Creek (Manitoba) =

River in Western Canada

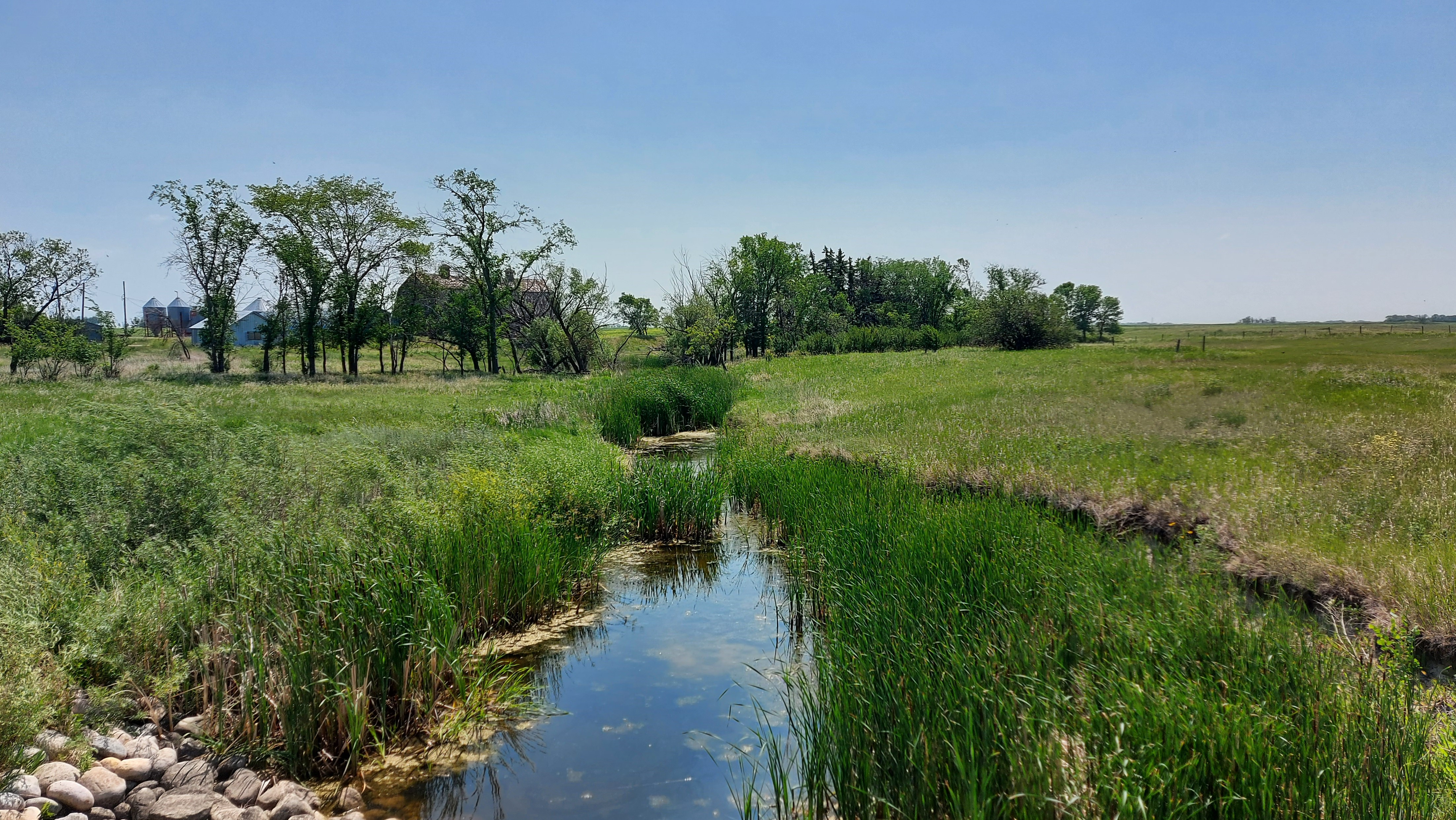
- Graham Creek crossing into Manitoba from Saskatchewan

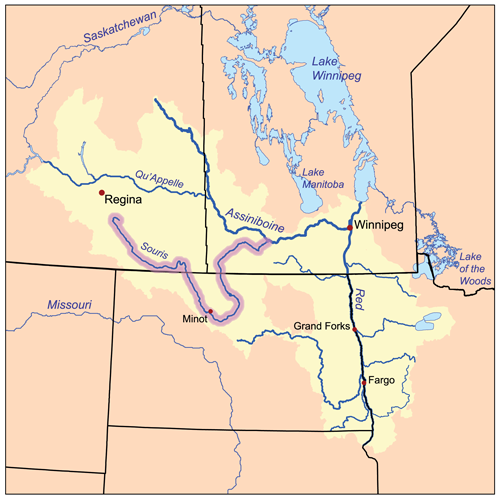
- The Red River drainage basin, with the Souris River highlighted

Location
- Countries: Canada
- Provinces: Saskatchewan; Manitoba
- Towns: Melita

Physical characteristics
- Source: about 11 km south of Maryfield, near Highway 600
  - location: Saskatchewan
- Mouth: Souris River
  - location: Manitoba
  - coordinates: 49°30′00″N 101°23′32″W
- Discharge
  - location: Souris River, west of Melita

Basin features
- River system: Red River drainage basin

Graham Creek, a tributary of the Souris River, is a stream that flows from Saskatchewan near Maryfield into Manitoba where it meets the Souris River on the west side of Melita, Manitoba. The Souris River, in turn, drains into the Assiniboine River, which is part of the Red River drainage basin in a region called the Prairie Pothole Region of North America. That region extends throughout three Canadian provinces and five U.S. states. It is also within Palliser's Triangle and the Great Plains ecoregion.

== Stream course ==
Graham Creek starts about 11 kilometres south of Maryfield, near Highway 600. From there, the stream heads towards the Manitoba border in a south-southeast direction where it crosses the border from Saskatchewan into Manitoba under the exact spot where Saskatchewan Highway 13 becomes Manitoba Highway 2. It continues in a south-southeast direction crossing Road 345 west of Tilston. Near the intersection of Road 256 and Road 445, it heads east along 445 until it meets the Souris River at Melita.

== Concrete Beam Bridge ==
In the Municipality of Two Borders, an historic bridge, Concrete Beam Bridge No. 1351, crosses Graham Creek. It was constructed in 1927 by John Kenward and Company for $6,443 and is on the Canadian Register of Historic Places.

== See also ==
- List of rivers of Saskatchewan
- List of rivers of Manitoba
- List of historic places in Westman Region, Manitoba
