= Bernice, Manitoba =

Bernice
- Location of Bernice in Manitoba
- Coordinates: 49°23′46″N 100°52′30″W
- Country: Canada
- Province: Manitoba
- Region: Westman Region
- Census Division: No. 5

Government
  - MP: Grant Jackson
  - MLA: Doyle Piwniuk
- Time zone: UTC−6 (CST)
  - Summer (DST): UTC−5 (CDT)
- Area code: 204
- NTS Map: 062F07
- GNBC Code: GACGQ

Bernice is an unincorporated place in the Municipality of Two Borders, 115 kilometres (71 mi) south-west of Brandon, Manitoba, Canada.

== History ==
A school was organized in 1888 named Gould School on SW22-5-26W. It was relocated to SE23-5-26 and renamed Bernice School No. 547. The school operated in that location until 1965 when the students were transferred to Napinka Consolidated School No. 2369.

In 1906, the locality was a station on the CP Rail Alida subdivision linking Alida, Saskatchewan and Lauder, Manitoba. The station was closed in 1952. The line was abandoned in 1978 after a flood in 1976 washed out the Bernice bridge.

A post office was established in 1910 and closed in 1916.

== Geography ==
The community is located on Highway 345 between the communities of Bede and Lauder. It is 24 kilometres (15 mi) north-east of the Town of Melita.

The area surrounding the community was greatly affected by wind erosion during the drought years of the 1930's Some farmland abandoned at that time has been brought back into cultivation, while other areas are used for pasture or provide wildlife habitat.

== Points of Interest ==
A monument was erected in 1988 near the one room building that held Bernice School No. 547 to commemorate the teachers, students and families.

Bernice Wildlife Management Area is one of a number of nearby protected areas providing opportunities to view wildlife.

== See also ==
- List of communities in Manitoba
