= Rural Municipality of Albert =

Rural municipality in Manitoba, Canada

Coordinates: 49°26′37″N 101°07′15″W

The Rural Municipality of Albert is a former rural municipality (RM) in the Canadian province of Manitoba. It was originally incorporated as a rural municipality on December 1, 1905. It ceased on January 1, 2015 as a result of its provincially mandated amalgamation with the RM of Arthur and the RM of Edward to form the Municipality of Two Borders.

It had a population of 339 in the 2006 census and was located in the Westman Region of the province.

This primarily agricultural municipality was formed in 1905 by a subdivision of the Rural Municipality of Arthur. The new entity was named after Albert Edward, Prince of Wales (later King Edward VII).

The population declined by 11.3% from 2001 to 2006. It had a land area of 769.55 square kilometres and ranked 3,544th in terms of population in Canada prior to amalgamation. It was located directly east of Manitoba's border with Saskatchewan.

== Climate ==
Climate data for Pierson (19 km south of the RM of Albert)
Month	Jan	Feb	Mar	Apr	May	Jun	Jul	Aug	Sep	Oct	Nov	Dec	Year
Record high °C (°F)	8.9 (48.0)	17.5 (63.5)	23.9 (75.0)	34 (93)	39.4 (102.9)	41.7 (107.1)	42.8 (109.0)	40 (104)	37.2 (99.0)	33 (91)	22.8 (73.0)	17.2 (63.0)	42.8 (109.0)
Mean daily maximum °C (°F)	−10.6 (12.9)	−6.3 (20.7)	−0.4 (31.3)	11.3 (52.3)	19.4 (66.9)	23.8 (74.8)	26.5 (79.7)	26.2 (79.2)	19.7 (67.5)	11.9 (53.4)	−0.1 (31.8)	−8 (18)	9.5 (49.1)
Mean daily minimum °C (°F)	−21.2 (−6.2)	−16.5 (2.3)	−9.8 (14.4)	−1.8 (28.8)	5.2 (41.4)	10.1 (50.2)	12.2 (54.0)	10.9 (51.6)	5.4 (41.7)	−1.1 (30.0)	−9.6 (14.7)	−18 (0)	−2.9 (26.8)
Record low °C (°F)	−44.4 (−47.9)	−47.8 (−54.0)	−45 (−49)	−26.1 (−15.0)	−12.2 (10.0)	−6.1 (21.0)	−2.2 (28.0)	−6.1 (21.0)	−12.2 (10.0)	−22.2 (−8.0)	−33.3 (−27.9)	−42 (−44)	−47.8 (−54.0)
Average precipitation mm (inches)	22.6 (0.89)	17.9 (0.70)	21.7 (0.85)	31.4 (1.24)	54.7 (2.15)	76.8 (3.02)	67.6 (2.66)	51.8 (2.04)	46.8 (1.84)	32.3 (1.27)	21.9 (0.86)	21.7 (0.85)	467.2 (18.39)
Source: Environment Canada

== Communities ==
- Bede
- Bernice
- Broomhill
- Tilston

== See also ==
- Royal eponyms in Canada
