= Bede, Manitoba =

Bede
- Location of Bede in Manitoba
- Coordinates: 49°23′56″N 100°58′7″W
- Country: Canada
- Province: Manitoba
- Region: Westman Region
- Census Division: No. 5

Government
  - MP: Grant Jackson
  - MLA: Doyle Piwniuk
- Time zone: UTC−6 (CST)
  - Summer (DST): UTC−5 (CDT)
- Area code: 204
- NTS Map: 062F07
- GNBC Code: GACBL

Bede is a community in the Municipality of Two Borders, Manitoba, Canada. The community is located at the intersection of Highway 345 & Highway 83 between the communities of Broomhill and Bernice, approximately 115 km south-west of Brandon, Manitoba only 16 km north of the Town of Melita. Very little remains of Bede, only a historic school house and the community cemetery remain.

The first Post Office, located on 30-5-26W, was opened under the name of Shilson in 1897. It became Ruth in 1908 and was located on 18-5-26W. The P.O. became Bede in 1925. It became a Canadian Pacific railway point in 1906.

== Infrastructure ==
Bede is served by Manitoba highways 345 and 83.

== See also ==
- List of communities in Manitoba
