= Division No. 5, Manitoba =

Census division in Canada

Coordinates: 49°16′00″N 100°22′30″W

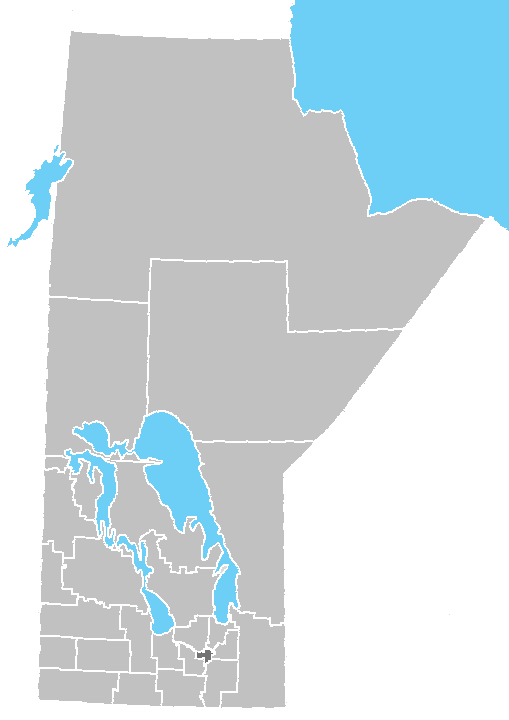

Division No. 5 (Southwestern area) is a census division located within the Westman Region in the south west area of the province of Manitoba, Canada. Unlike in some other provinces, census divisions do not reflect the organization of local government in Manitoba. These areas exist solely for the purposes of statistical analysis and presentation; they have no government of their own.

The major industry of Westman is agriculture. However, there is also some oil production in the southwest area of the region.

== Demographics ==
In the 2021 Census of Population conducted by Statistics Canada, Division No. 5 had a population of 13,326 living in 5,553 of its 7,027 total private dwellings, a change of 1.1% from its 2016 population of 13,176. With a land area of 8,282.38 km^{2} (3,197.84 sq mi), it had a population density of 1.6/km^{2} (4.2/sq mi) in 2021.

== Towns ==
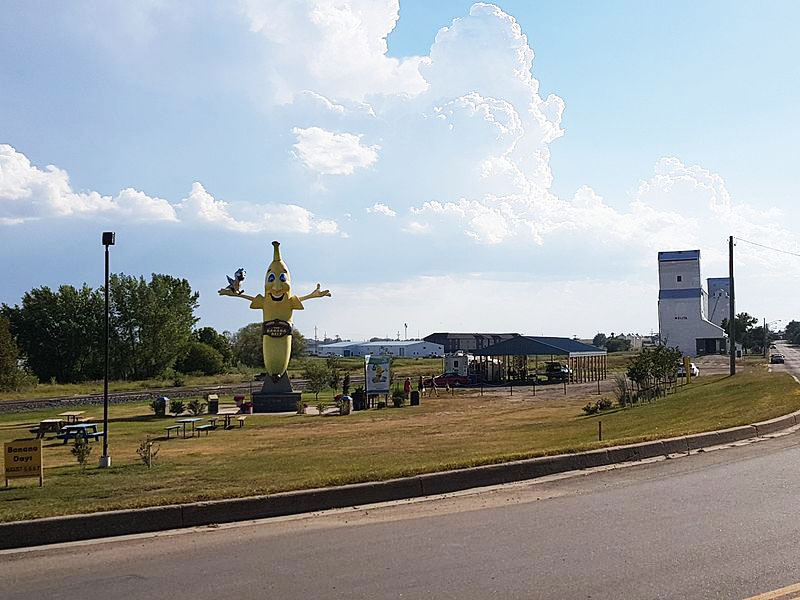
Front Street in Melita

- Melita

== Unincorporated Urban Communities ==
- Boissevain
- Deloraine
- Hartney
- Killarney
- Waskada

== Rural municipalities ==
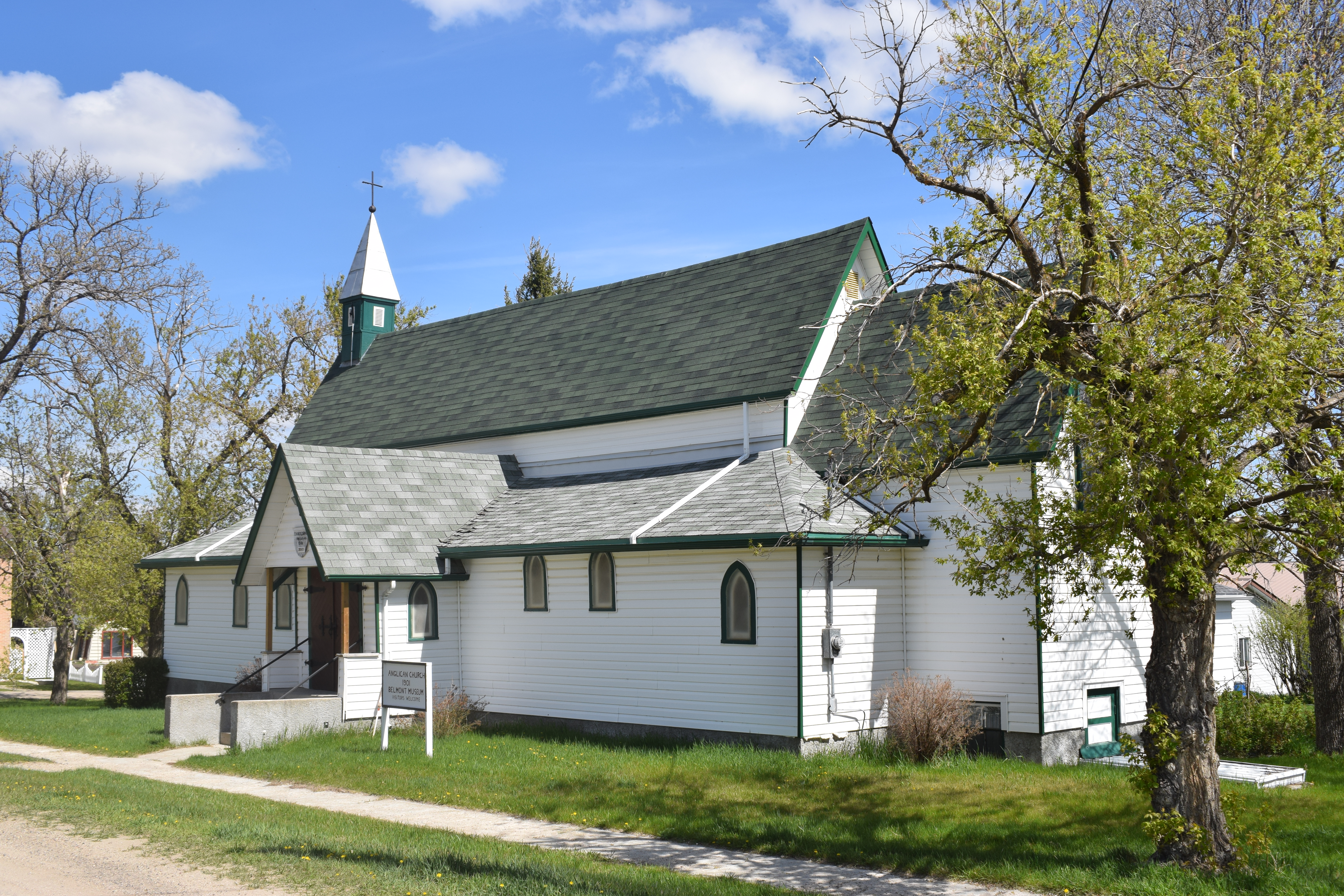
Belmont Anglican Church in the Rural Municipality of Prairie Lakes

- Boissevain – Morton
- Brenda – Waskada
- Deloraine – Winchester
- Grassland
- Killarney – Turtle Mountain
- Prairie Lakes
- Two Borders

== Former rural municipalities ==
- Albert (amalgamated with the RMs of Arthur and Edward in 2015)
- Arthur (amalgamated with the RMs of Albert and Edward in 2015)
- Brenda (amalgamated with the Village of Waskada in 2015)
- Cameron (amalgamated with the Town of Hartney and RM of Whitewater in 2015)
- Edward (amalgamated with the RMs of Albert and Arthur in 2015)
- Turtle Mountain (amalgamated with the Town of Killarney in 2007)
- Morton (amalgamated with the Town of Boissevain in 2015)
- Riverside (amalgamated with the RM of Strathcona in 2015)
- Strathcona (amalgamated with the RM of Riverside in 2015)
- Whitewater (amalgamated with the Town of Hartney and RM of Cameron in 2015)
- Winchester (amalgamated with the Town of Deloraine in 2015)
