= Bernice Wildlife Management Area =

Wildlife management area in Manitoba, Canada

- Interactive map of Bernice Wildlife Management Area
- Coordinates: 49°22′50″N 100°51′20″W
- Area: 65 ha (160 acres)
- Established: 1974

Bernice Wildlife Management Area is a wildlife management area located northeast of Melita, Manitoba, Canada. It is 65 hectares (0.25 sq mi) in size.

== History ==
Bernice Wildlife Management Area was established in 1974 under the Manitoba Wildlife Act.

The WMA is in an area known locally as 'Poverty Plains'. Farming in the area was abandoned during the drought in the 1930s and the land is now reclaimed for wildlife habitat.

== Geography ==
The area lies southeast of Bernice. Its eastern boundary is adjacent to Corner Diamond Road. There are no facilities for visitors. It is within the Souris River Watershed.

== Ecology ==
The area is within the Oak Lake Ecodistrict within the Aspen Parkland Ecoregion in the Prairies Ecozone.

Bird species found in the WMA include:

- Sharp-tailed grouse
- Ruffed grouse
- Gray partridge
- Baird's sparrow
- Loggerhead shrike
- Sprague's pipit
- Savannah sparrow
- Lark bunting
- Chestnut-collared longspur

Mammal species found in the WMA include:

- Short-tailed weasel
- Red fox
- Badger
- Long-tailed weasel
- Coyote
- White-tailed deer

== See also ==
- List of wildlife management areas in Manitoba
- List of protected areas of Manitoba
