= Broomhill, Manitoba =

Broomhill
- Location of Broomhill in Manitoba
- Coordinates: 49°23′35″N 101°5′15″W
- Country: Canada
- Province: Manitoba
- Region: Westman Region
- Census Division: No. 5

Government
  - MP: Grant Jackson
  - MLA: Doyle Piwniuk
- Time zone: UTC−6 (CST)
  - Summer (DST): UTC−5 (CDT)
- Area code: 204
- NTS Map: 062F06
- GNBC Code: GADSV

Broomhill is a community in the Municipality of Two Borders, Manitoba, Canada. The community is located on Highway 345 between the communities of Tilston and Bede, approximately 124 km south-west of Brandon, Manitoba only 25 km north-west of the Town of Melita. The town was named for the abundance of Broom plants that were seen growing on the sandhills in the area. This area is commonly known for its rare mix of grasslands and wildlife.

== Infrastructure ==
Broomhill was served by the Canadian Pacific Railway on its Alida subdivision until a storm in the spring of 1976 washed out the bridge over the Souris River near Lauder Manitoba. The bridge was never repaired and the line was salvaged beginning in 1978. It is currently accessible via Highway 345.

== See also ==
- List of communities in Manitoba
