= Rural Municipality of Arthur =

Rural municipality in Manitoba, Canada

Coordinates: 49°10′39″N 100°58′20″W

The Rural Municipality of Arthur is a former rural municipality (RM) in the Canadian province of Manitoba. It was originally incorporated as a rural municipality on December 22, 1883. In 1891, the subdistrict of Arthur had a population of 666. It ceased on January 1, 2015 as a result of its provincially mandated amalgamation with the RM of Albert and the RM of Edward to form the Municipality of Two Borders.

The RM was located in the southwestern part of the province, along its border with the state of North Dakota in the United States. The 2006 Census showed a population of 440 persons, a decline from its 2001 population of 480. The administratively separate town of Melita is surrounded by its territory.

== Geography ==
According to Statistics Canada, the rural municipality has an area of 765.77 km^{2} (295.67 sq mi). The administratively separate town of Melita is enclaved by the Rural Municipality of Arthur, at a little north of its centre.

=== Communities ===
- Coulter
- Dalny
- Elva

=== Adjacent municipalities ===
- Rural Municipality of Edward - (west)
- Rural Municipality of Albert - (north)
- Rural Municipality of Brenda - (east)
- Bottineau County, North Dakota - (south)

== See also ==
- Royal eponyms in Canada
