= Rural Municipality of Edward =

Rural municipality in Manitoba, Canada

Coordinates: 49°10′39″N 101°14′32″W

The Rural Municipality of Edward is a former rural municipality (RM) in the Canadian province of Manitoba. It was originally incorporated as a rural municipality on December 1, 1905. It ceased on January 1, 2015 as a result of its provincially mandated amalgamation with the RM of Albert and the RM of Arthur to form the Municipality of Two Borders.

The RM was located at the southwesternmost part of the province, bordering the province of Saskatchewan in Canada and the state of North Dakota in the United States. The population was 621 persons at the 2006 Census, a decline from 679 in the 2001 Census. It included the unincorporated communities of Pierson and Lyleton.

== Geography ==
According to Statistics Canada, the RM had an area of 769.14 km^{2} (296.97 sq mi).

=== Adjacent municipalities ===
- Storthoaks No. 31, Saskatchewan (northwest)
- Argyle No. 1, Saskatchewan - (west)
- Rural Municipality of Albert - (north)
- Rural Municipality of Arthur - (east)
- Bottineau County, North Dakota - (south)
