= Napinka =

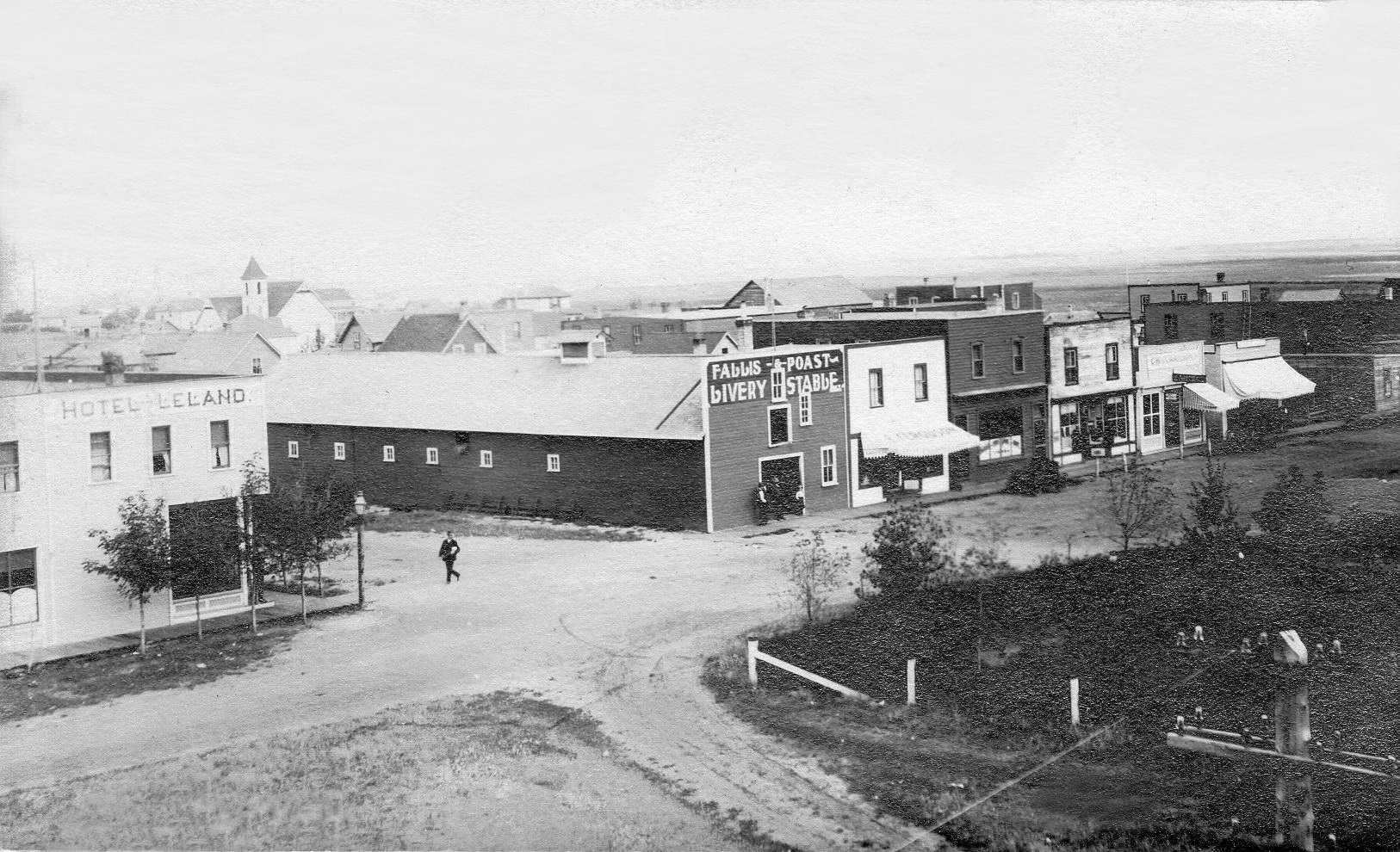
- Napinka, circa 1910

- Location of Napinka in Manitoba
- Coordinates: 49°19′21″N 100°50′28″W
- Country: Canada
- Province: Manitoba
- Region: Westman Region
- Census Division: No. 5
- Established,: 1882
- Incorporated: 1908
- Dissolved: 1986

Government
  - MP: Grant Jackson
  - MLA: Doyle Piwniuk
- Time zone: UTC−6 (CST)
  - Summer (DST): UTC−5 (CDT)
- Postal Code: R0M 1N0
- Area code: 204
- NTS Map: 062F07
- GNBC Code: GASUJ

Napinka is an unincorporated community in southwestern Manitoba, Canada. The village of Napinka was incorporated on May 1, 1908. On January 1, 1986 the village dissolved and Napinka became part of the Rural Municipality of Brenda (now the Municipality of Brenda – Waskada).
