= Elva, Manitoba =

Elva
- Location of Elva in Manitoba
- Coordinates: 49°12′58″N 101°6′55″W
- Country: Canada
- Province: Manitoba
- Region: Westman
- Census Division: No. 5

Government
  - MP: Grant Jackson
  - MLA: Doyle Piwniuk
- Time zone: UTC−6 (CST)
  - Summer (DST): UTC−5 (CDT)
- Area codes: 204, 431
- NTS Map: 062F03
- GNBC Code: GAHSS

Elva is an unincorporated community located within the Municipality of Two Borders in south-western Manitoba, Canada. It is located approximately 10 kilometers (6 miles) southwest of Melita, Manitoba. Manitoba Provincial Road 252 (PR 252) passes through the community, as does a railroad line.
