= Lauder, Manitoba =

Community in Manitoba, Canada

Lauder
- Location of Lauder in Manitoba
- Coordinates: 49°23′26″N 100°40′37″W
- Country: Canada
- Province: Manitoba
- Region: Westman Region
- Census Division: No. 5

Government
  - Governing Body: Rural Municipality of Cameron Council
  - MP: Grant Jackson
  - MLA: Doyle Piwniuk
- Time zone: UTC−6 (CST)
  - Summer (DST): UTC−5 (CDT)
- Postal Code: R0M 1C0
- Area code: 204
- NTS Map: 062F07
- GNBC Code: GAOGM

Lauder is a small community in the Rural Municipality of Grassland in the Canadian province of Manitoba. The community is located at the junction of Highway 254 and Highway 345, approximately 100 km south-west of Brandon only 22 km south-west of the Town of Hartney. Lauder is about 3 miles south of the Souris River and the Lauder Sand Hills.

Lauder was established in 1891 by the Canadian Pacific Railway and named after Archdeacon John Strutt Lauder, rector of Christ Church in Ottawa. The first survey laid out blocks 1-3 then in 1903, the CPR surveyors laid out blocks 4-7. About the only type of business the town didn't have in its long history was a fire department. The first of several devastating fires was "the great fire of 1894". 125 years after its establishment, there is only one business left in town and most of the buildings are gone but the community spirit is strong.

== Infrastructure ==
Lauder is served by the Canadian Pacific Railway, as well Manitoba Highways 254 & 345.

== Attractions ==
- Lauder Sand Hills

== Notable people ==
- Robert Fulton Logan (1889-1959), a painter, illustrator, and specialist in copper etchings.
- Gordon G. Phillips (1927-1992), helped design and build the Alouette communication satellites. In 1965 he went to work in the Canadian Patent Office.

== See also ==
- List of communities in Manitoba
