= Antler–Lyleton Border Crossing =

Border crossing between Canada and the United States

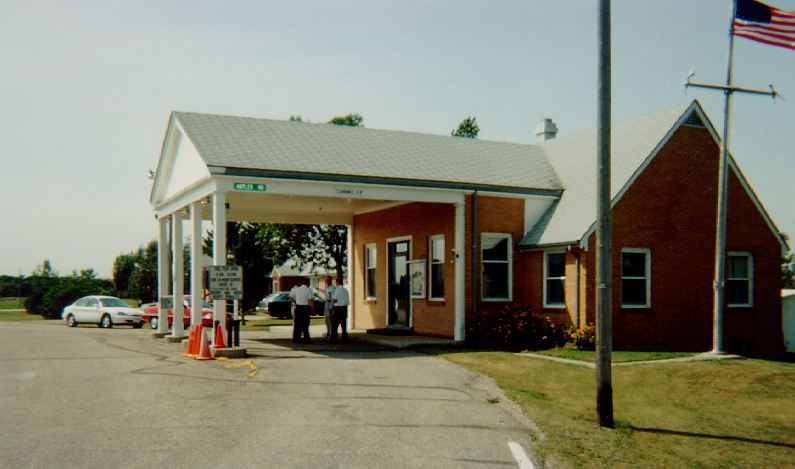
- US Border Inspection Station at Antler, North Dakota as seen in 1998

Locaiton
- Country: United States; Canada
- Location: ND 256 / PR 256; US Port: 10945 Hwy 256, Antler, ND 58711; Canadian Port: Manitoba Provincial Road 256, Pierson, Manitoba R0M 0S0
- Coordinates: 48.999469°N 101.296502°W

Details
- Opened: 1938

Website
- https://www.cbp.gov/contact/ports/antler-north-dakota-3413

The Antler–Lyleton Border Crossing connects the cities of Antler, North Dakota, Pierson, Manitoba, and Lyleton, Manitoba on the Canada–United States border. It is reached by North Dakota Highway 256 in Bottineau County on the American side and Manitoba Provincial Road 256 in the Municipality of Two Borders on the Canadian side. This is the westernmost international border crossing in Manitoba; the Manitoba-Saskatchewan-North Dakota tripoint is located only 4.5 kilometers (2.8 miles) west of this border crossing.

The United States replaced its border station in 2011. Canada replaced the Lyleton border station in 2013.

== See also ==
- List of Canada–United States border crossings
