= Westhope–Coulter Border Crossing =

Border crossing between Canada and the United States

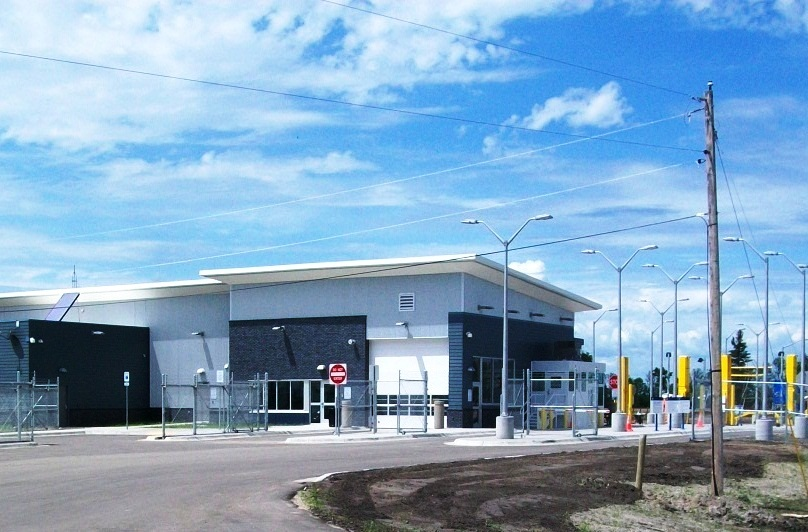
- US Border Inspection Station at Westhope, North Dakota

Locaiton
- Country: United States; Canada
- Location: US 83 / PTH 83; US Port: 10923 US Route 83, Westhope, North Dakota 58793; Canadian Port: Manitoba Highway 83, Melita, Manitoba R0M 1L0
- Coordinates: 48°59′59″N 101°01′05″W

Details
- Opened: 1930

Website
- US Canadian

The Westhope–Coulter Border Crossing connects the towns of Westhope, North Dakota and Melita, Manitoba on the Canada–United States border. U.S. Route 83 on the American side joins Manitoba Highway 83 on the Canadian side.

== Canadian side ==
The initial inspection station was established at Melita about 32 kilometres (20 mi) north of the present crossing. A.M. Reekie was the inaugural customs officer 1900–1916. Under the administrative oversight of the Port of Brandon, the office handled goods received by road. Inconveniently located and vulnerable to smuggling, the office moved to the border in 1930, adopting the name of Coulter, the nearest post office. That year, a combined residence/office was erected.

The building was replaced in 1947, then in 2014.

In 2020, the former border hours of 8am–9pm reduced, becoming 8am–4pm.

== US side ==
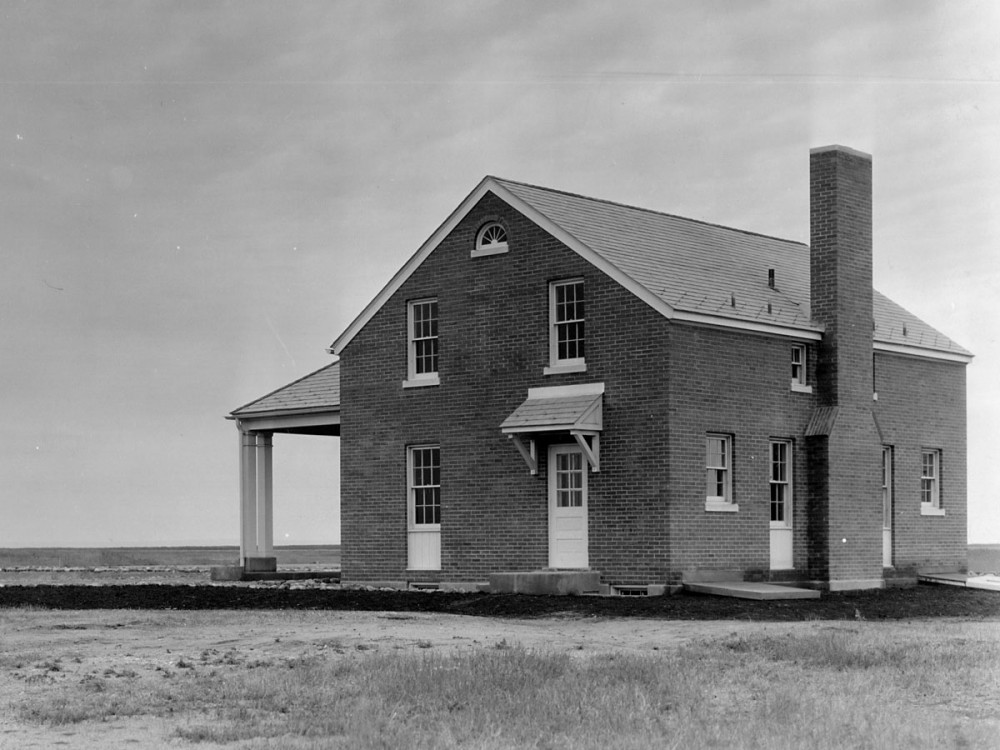
Westhope North Dakota border inspection station, 1937

The US first built a permanent inspection station at the border in 1937. That brick veneer roadside border station was replaced by a new building in the 1974, which in turn was replaced by a large modern border station in 2011.

== See also ==
- List of Canada–United States border crossings
