= Goodlands, Manitoba =

Unincorporated community in Manitoba, Canada

Goodlands
- Village
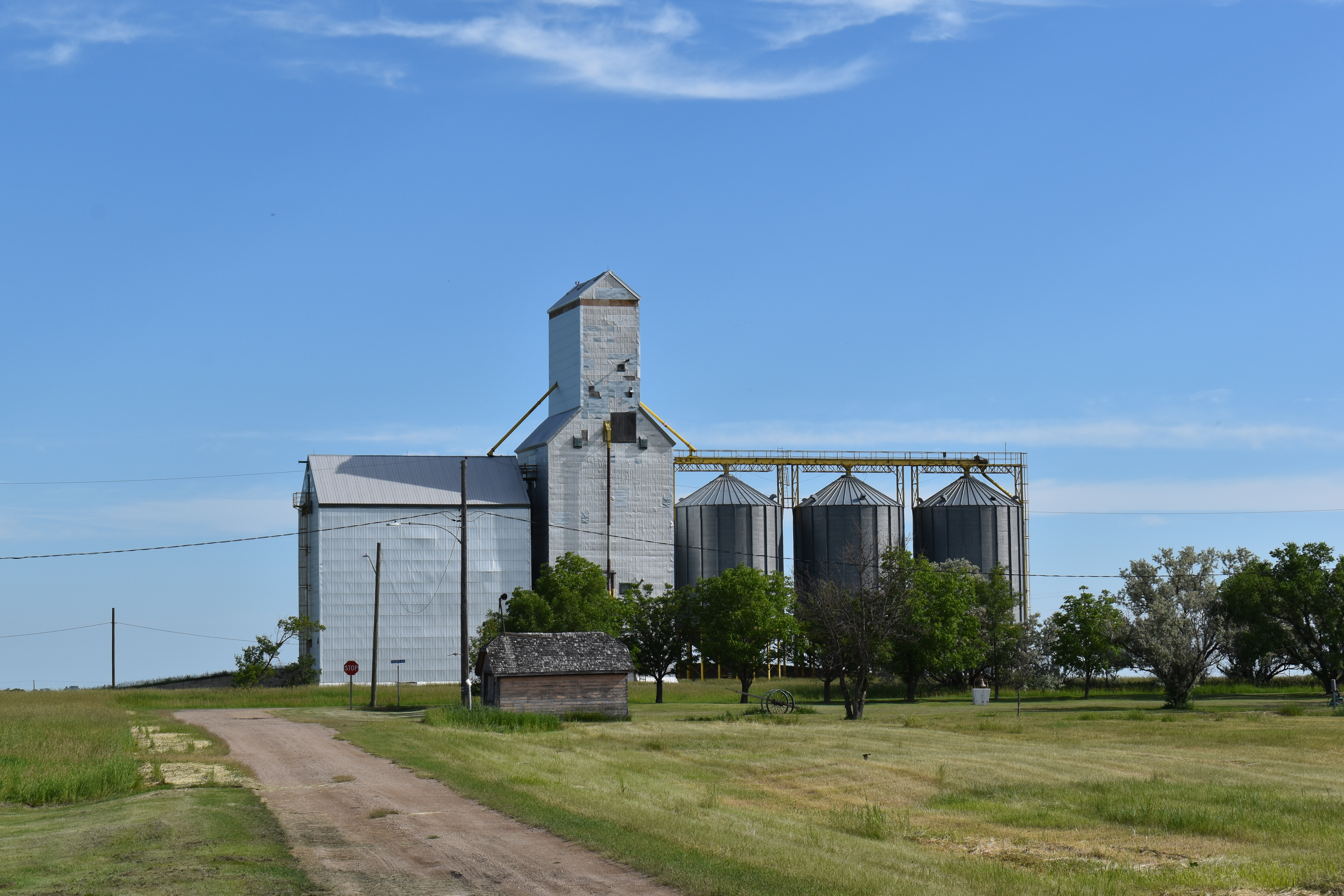
- Goodland's Grain Elevator
- Motto: West of the Turtles
- Location of Goodlands in Manitoba
- Coordinates: 49°05′40″N 100°36′14″W
- Rural Municipality: Brenda-Waskada

Government
  - MP (Brandon-Souris): Grant Jackson (CPC)

Goodlands is an unincorporated rural community in the Municipality of Brenda-Waskada within the Canadian province of Manitoba. The community is located east of Waskada and west of the Turtle Mountains. The Carbury–Goodlands Border Crossing is located a short distance to the south. Goodlands has a grain elevator which used to be served by the Canadian Pacific Railway Lyleton Line until 1996, when the local railway was abandoned.

== Notable people ==
- Chris Nielsen - Former NHL hockey player
