= Tilston, Manitoba =

Tilston
- Location of Tilston in Manitoba
- Coordinates: 49°23′37″N 101°18′46″W
- Country: Canada
- Province: Manitoba
- Region: Westman Region
- Census Division: No. 5

Government
  - MP: Grant Jackson
  - MLA: Doyle Piwniuk
- Time zone: UTC−6 (CST)
  - Summer (DST): UTC−5 (CDT)
- Postal Code: R0M 2B0
- Area code: 204
- NTS Map: 062F06
- GNBC Code: GBBVK

Tilston is a small community in the Municipality of Two Borders, Manitoba, Canada. The community is located at the junction of Road 256 and Road 345, approximately 144 km south-west of Brandon, Manitoba only 58 kilometers south-west of the Town of Hartney.

On July 27, 2015, the longest-documented tornado in Canadian history touched down near Tilston, staying on the ground for 2.5 to 3 hours. It was rated EF2.

== Infrastructure ==
Tilston was served by the Canadian Pacific Railway until a spring storm in 1976 washed out the rail bridge near Lauder Manitoba. The bridge was not repaired and the line was salvaged beginning in 1978. Two grain elevators remain standing and some of the ties on the former siding are still in place. Manitoba Highways 256 & 345 are the main travel routes to and from Town.

== See also ==
- List of communities in Manitoba
