= Municipality of Brenda-Waskada =

Rural municipality in Manitoba, Canada

Brenda-Waskada
- Rural municipality
- Municipality of Brenda-Waskada
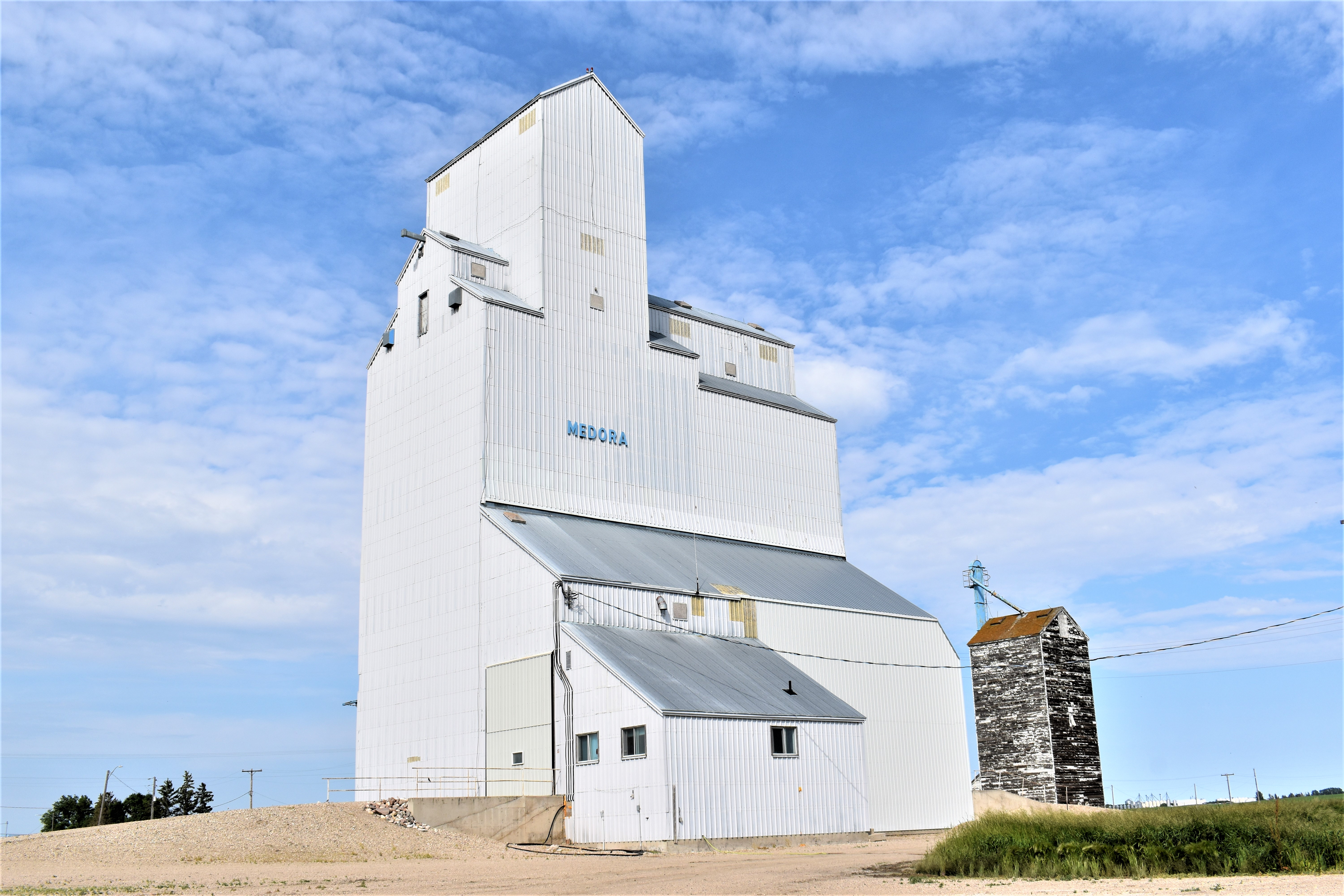
- The Medora grain elevator.

- Location of Brenda-Waskada in Manitoba
- Coordinates: 49.096°N 100.800°W
- Country: Canada
- Province: Manitoba
- Region: Westman
- Incorporated (amalgamated): January 1, 2015

Area
  - Total: 775.64 km^{2} (299.48 sq mi)

Population (2021)
  - Total: 650
  - Density: 0.84/km^{2} (2.2/sq mi)
- Time zone: UTC-6 (CST)
  - Summer (DST): UTC-5 (CDT)
- Website: www.waskada.org

The Municipality of Brenda-Waskada is a rural municipality (RM) in the Canadian province of Manitoba.

== History ==
The RM was incorporated on January 1, 2015 via the amalgamation of the RM of Brenda and the Village of Waskada. It was named after Major Adoniram Cates' daughter, Brenda Cates (1888-1964), though the municipality was incorporated in 1888, four years before she was born. It was formed as a requirement of The Municipal Amalgamations Act, which required that municipalities with a population less than 1,000 amalgamate with one or more neighbouring municipalities by 2015. The Government of Manitoba initiated these amalgamations in order for municipalities to meet the 1997 minimum population requirement of 1,000 to incorporate a municipality.

== Geography ==
The RM is located in the southwest corner of Manitoba. It southern boundary is the Canada–United States border opposite Bottineau County, North Dakota, however, there is no direct access to the U.S. from the RM.

=== Communities ===
- Goodlands
- Medora
- Napinka
- Waskada

== Demographics ==
In the 2021 Census of Population conducted by Statistics Canada, Brenda-Waskada had a population of 650 living in 277 of its 332 total private dwellings, a change of −3.6% from its 2016 population of 674. With a land area of 775.64 km^{2} (299.48 sq mi), it had a population density of 0.8/km^{2} (2.2/sq mi) in 2021.
