= Rural Municipality of Brenda =

Rural municipality in Manitoba, Canada

Coordinates: 49°10′39″N 100°42′07″W

The Rural Municipality of Brenda is a former rural municipality (RM) in the Canadian province of Manitoba. It was originally incorporated as a rural municipality on December 22, 1883. It ceased on January 1, 2015 as a result of its provincially mandated amalgamation with the Village of Waskada to form the Municipality of Brenda – Waskada.

The RM was located in the southwestern part of the province, along the border with the state of North Dakota in the United States. It had a 2006 Census population of 549 persons, a decline from the 2001 Census figure of 616 persons.

== Geography ==
According to Statistics Canada, the rural municipality had an area of 766.00 km^{2} (295.75 sq mi). The main settlements within the RM were Goodlands, Leighton, Medora, and Napinka.

=== Adjacent municipalities ===
- Rural Municipality of Arthur - (west)
- Rural Municipality of Cameron - (north)
- Rural Municipality of Winchester - (east)
- Bottineau County, North Dakota - (south)
