= Pierson, Manitoba =

Pierson
- Local urban district
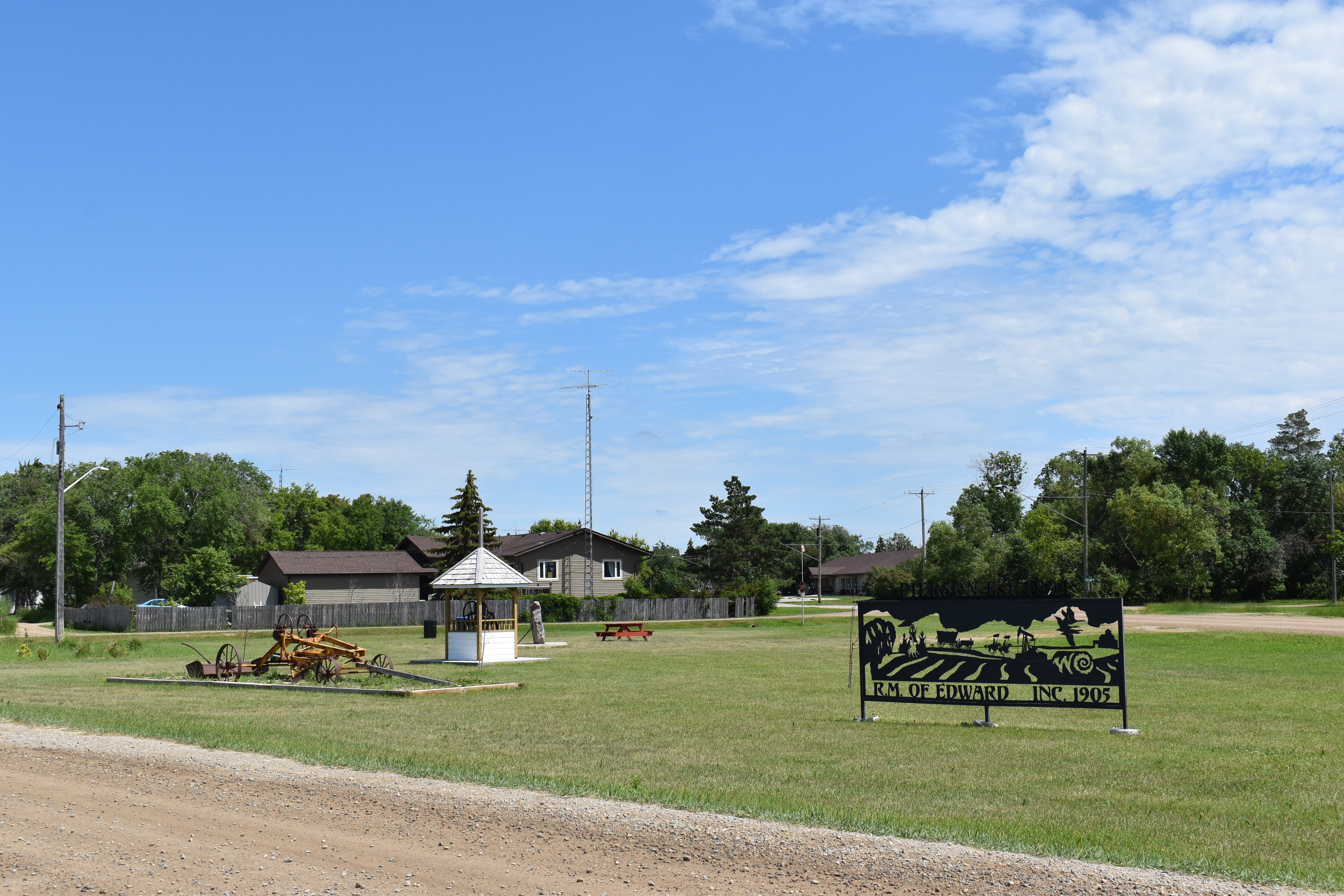
- Welcome sign in Pierson, still indicating the RM of Edward.

- Location of Pierson in Manitoba
- Coordinates: 49°10′48″N 101°15′45″W
- Country: Canada
- Province: Manitoba
- Region: Westman
- Rural Municipality: Municipality of Two Borders

Government
  - MLA: Doyle Piwniuk

Area
  - Total: 1.94 km^{2} (0.75 sq mi)
- Elevation: 253.6 m (832 ft)

Population (2021)
  - Total: 174
  - Density: 89.7/km^{2} (232/sq mi)
- Time zone: UTC-6 (CST)
  - Summer (DST): UTC-5 (CDT)
- Area code: 204

Pierson is an unincorporated community recognized as a local urban district located in the Municipality of Two Borders in southwestern Manitoba, Canada. The Antler–Lyleton Border Crossing is located south of Pierson.

Pierson is home to the Carnival of Crafts which averages an attendance of 1,700 people. This event takes place at the Edward Sports Centre on the first Saturday in October.

== Demographics ==
In the 2021 Census of Population conducted by Statistics Canada, Pierson had a population of 174 living in 85 of its 106 total private dwellings, a change of −8.4% from its 2016 population of 190. With a land area of 1.94 km^{2} (0.75 sq mi), it had a population density of 89.7/km^{2} (232.3/sq mi) in 2021.

== Climate ==
Pierson has a humid continental climate (Dfb) with great differences between summer and winter. The regime is typical of southern Manitoba, the northern edges of North Dakota and the surrounding border region.

Climate data for Pierson
Month	Jan	Feb	Mar	Apr	May	Jun	Jul	Aug	Sep	Oct	Nov	Dec	Year
Record high °C (°F)	8.9 (48.0)	17.5 (63.5)	23.9 (75.0)	34.0 (93.2)	39.4 (102.9)	41.7 (107.1)	42.8 (109.0)	40.0 (104.0)	37.2 (99.0)	33.0 (91.4)	22.8 (73.0)	17.2 (63.0)	42.8 (109.0)
Mean daily maximum °C (°F)	−9 (16)	−5.7 (21.7)	0.9 (33.6)	12.1 (53.8)	19.1 (66.4)	23.6 (74.5)	26.7 (80.1)	26.6 (79.9)	20.2 (68.4)	11.6 (52.9)	0.5 (32.9)	−7 (19)	10 (50)
Daily mean °C (°F)	−14.2 (6.4)	−11.0 (12.2)	−4.2 (24.4)	5.3 (41.5)	11.9 (53.4)	16.8 (62.2)	19.6 (67.3)	18.9 (66.0)	12.9 (55.2)	5.1 (41.2)	−4.5 (23.9)	−11.9 (10.6)	3.7 (38.7)
Mean daily minimum °C (°F)	−19.5 (−3.1)	−16.2 (2.8)	−9.1 (15.6)	−1.6 (29.1)	4.7 (40.5)	10.1 (50.2)	12.3 (54.1)	11.2 (52.2)	5.6 (42.1)	−1.4 (29.5)	−9.4 (15.1)	−16.8 (1.8)	−2.5 (27.5)
Record low °C (°F)	−44.4 (−47.9)	−47.8 (−54.0)	−45.0 (−49.0)	−26.1 (−15.0)	−12.2 (10.0)	−9.4 (15.1)	−2.2 (28.0)	−6.1 (21.0)	−12.2 (10.0)	−22.2 (−8.0)	−33.3 (−27.9)	−42.0 (−43.6)	−47.8 (−54.0)
Average precipitation mm (inches)	22.9 (0.90)	13.9 (0.55)	23.1 (0.91)	27.5 (1.08)	55.1 (2.17)	77.7 (3.06)	70.4 (2.77)	51.6 (2.03)	37.3 (1.47)	33.2 (1.31)	22.7 (0.89)	21.9 (0.86)	457.3 (18.00)
Source: Environment Canada
