= Waskada =

Unincorporated urban community in Manitoba, Canada

- Former village
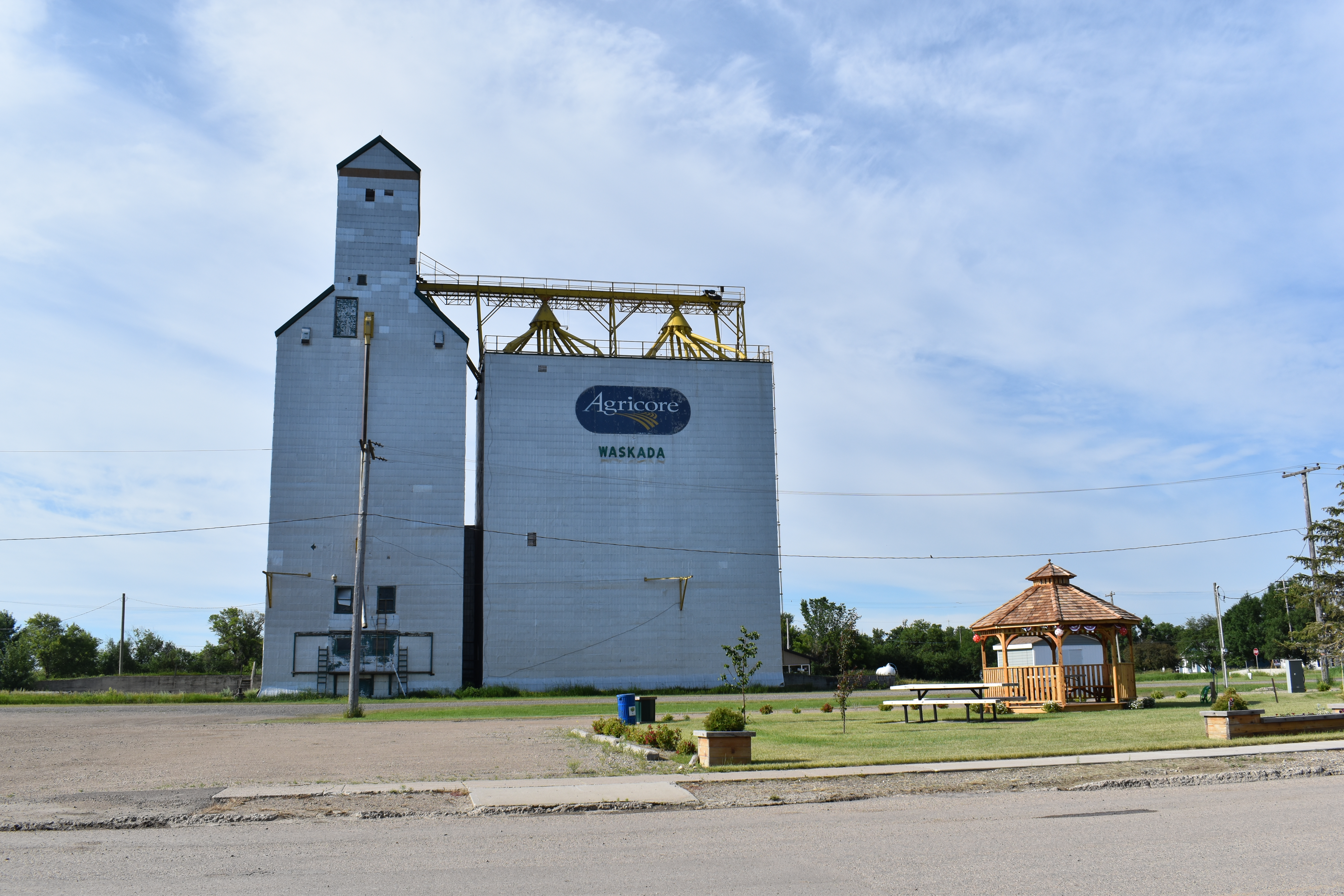
- The former grain elevator and park in Waskada.

- Location of Waskada in Manitoba
- Coordinates: 49°05′51″N 100°48′05″W
- Country: Canada
- Province: Manitoba
- Region: Westman
- Municipality: Brenda – Waskada
- Incorporated: 31 December 1948
- Amalgamated: 1 January 2015

Area
  - Total: 0.77 km^{2} (0.30 sq mi)

Population (2011)
  - Total: 183
  - Density: 238.5/km^{2} (618/sq mi)
  - Change 2006-11: ▼8.0%
- Time zone: UTC-6 (Central (CST))
  - Summer (DST): UTC-5 (Central (CDT))
- Area code: 204
- Website: www.waskada.org

Waskada is an unincorporated urban community in the Municipality of Brenda – Waskada within the Canadian province of Manitoba that held village status prior to January 1, 2015. It is located in the southwest corner of the province, close to the United States and Saskatchewan borders. It was settled as early as 1883 and incorporated as a village in 1948. Waskada has a population of 183, and covers a land area of 0.77 km^{2}. Though traditionally a farming community, since 2010 an oil boom has also brought economic activity to the area.

== History ==
There are different theories about the origin of the name of Waskada. One states that it was given by the federal government, being an Aboriginal word meaning "the best of everything," and another, attributed to Manitoba politician Robert Stirton Thornton, states that it was derived by a Sioux expression, "wa-sta-daow," meaning "better further on," which was told to settlers in hopes that they would keep moving on and not settle in the area.

One of the earliest signs of settlement in Waskada is the local post office, which was established in the area in 1883, and the rest of the town was built around. The settlement was incorporated as a village on 31 December 1948, but was amalgamated into the Municipality of Brenda – Waskada on 1 January 2015, as part of a requirement of the Manitoba government's Municipal Amalgamations Act.

In recent times, an oil boom in the Waskada area, which lies within the Lower Amaranth oil deposit, occurred in 2011, contributing to the local economy.

An aviation accident occurred in the area in the winter of 2013, when the pilot of a Cessna 210 single-engined aircraft crash-landed 5 km (3.1 mi) outside a private airstrip, in whiteout conditions. The pilot, as well as all three passengers, were killed.

== Geography ==
Waskada lies in the southwest corner of the Westman Region, itself at the southwest corner of Manitoba. It is located in the Canadian Prairies, an ecoregion characterized by its flat terrain and grasslands, as well as Palliser's Triangle. Waskada is, by highway, 142 km (88 mi) from the Westman region's largest city, Brandon, 47 km (29 mi) from the Saskatchewan border, and 10.7 km (6.6 mi) from the North Dakota border.

Climate data for Waskada (1951−1980 normals, extremes 1924−1987)
Month	Jan	Feb	Mar	Apr	May	Jun	Jul	Aug	Sep	Oct	Nov	Dec	Year
Record high °C (°F)	9.4 (48.9)	13.3 (55.9)	24.4 (75.9)	36.5 (97.7)	39.0 (102.2)	42.8 (109.0)	43.3 (109.9)	39.4 (102.9)	39.5 (103.1)	32.8 (91.0)	22.8 (73.0)	17.8 (64.0)	43.3 (109.9)
Mean daily maximum °C (°F)	−12.8 (9.0)	−7.8 (18.0)	−1.2 (29.8)	10.0 (50.0)	18.7 (65.7)	23.6 (74.5)	26.9 (80.4)	25.9 (78.6)	19.5 (67.1)	13.1 (55.6)	0.5 (32.9)	−7.5 (18.5)	9.1 (48.4)
Daily mean °C (°F)	−18.5 (−1.3)	−14.1 (6.6)	−7.3 (18.9)	4.1 (39.4)	11.7 (53.1)	16.7 (62.1)	19.6 (67.3)	17.9 (64.2)	12.4 (54.3)	6.0 (42.8)	−4.8 (23.4)	−13.0 (8.6)	2.6 (36.7)
Mean daily minimum °C (°F)	−24.7 (−12.5)	−20.5 (−4.9)	−13.3 (8.1)	−2.1 (28.2)	4.3 (39.7)	9.6 (49.3)	12.1 (53.8)	9.9 (49.8)	5.0 (41.0)	−1.1 (30.0)	−10.4 (13.3)	−19.1 (−2.4)	−4.2 (24.4)
Record low °C (°F)	−42.8 (−45.0)	−51.7 (−61.1)	−41.7 (−43.1)	−27.2 (−17.0)	−12.2 (10.0)	−5.6 (21.9)	−0.6 (30.9)	−2.8 (27.0)	−11.7 (10.9)	−21.7 (−7.1)	−33.9 (−29.0)	−45.0 (−49.0)	−51.7 (−61.1)
Average precipitation mm (inches)	22.8 (0.90)	19.8 (0.78)	22.3 (0.88)	32.0 (1.26)	46.2 (1.82)	82.9 (3.26)	64.3 (2.53)	63.1 (2.48)	47.4 (1.87)	20.6 (0.81)	14.0 (0.55)	17.6 (0.69)	453.0 (17.83)
Average rainfall mm (inches)	0.3 (0.01)	0.4 (0.02)	2.0 (0.08)	22.8 (0.90)	45.7 (1.80)	82.9 (3.26)	64.3 (2.53)	63.1 (2.48)	46.9 (1.85)	17.5 (0.69)	1.6 (0.06)	0.5 (0.02)	348.0 (13.70)
Average snowfall cm (inches)	22.4 (8.8)	19.4 (7.6)	20.6 (8.1)	9.0 (3.5)	0.8 (0.3)	0.0 (0.0)	0.0 (0.0)	0.0 (0.0)	0.4 (0.2)	4.7 (1.9)	12.4 (4.9)	17.1 (6.7)	106.8 (42.0)
Average precipitation days (≥ 0.2 mm)	4	3	3	5	8	9	7	7	6	3	2	3	60
Average rainy days (≥ 0.2 mm)	0	0	0	3	7	9	7	7	6	3	0	0	42
Average snowy days (≥ 0.2 cm)	4	4	3	2	0	0	0	0	0	1	2	4	20
Source: ECCC

== Demographics ==
In the 2021 Census of Population conducted by Statistics Canada, Waskada had a population of 161 living in 79 of its 106 total private dwellings, a change of −3.6% from its 2016 population of 167. With a land area of 0.8 km^{2} (0.31 sq mi), it had a population density of 201.3/km^{2} (521.2/sq mi) in 2021.

In the 2011 Canadian census, the median age was 50.8 years old, 10.2 years older than the national average of 40.6. There were 103 private dwellings, 80 of which were occupied.

English is generally the only language used in Waskada, being the first official language of all of the population, and also being the mother tongue of its vast majority (97.3%). The remaining 2.7% have German as their mother tongue, and 2.7% of residents also knows French as a second language.

Of those in Waskada aged 15 or older, 75.9% are married or living with a common-law partner, 10.3% have never been married, 3.4% are separated, 3.4% are divorced, and 10.3% are widowed.

== Infrastructure ==
Waskada's infrastructure includes water and sewer facilities, as well as a volunteer-run fire hall, garbage service and recycling depot. High-speed cable Internet service is provided to the settlement by MTS.

Waskada has several facilities for sports, including a fitness centre, a community hockey/skating rink, a park and a golf course.

=== Culture ===
The Waskada Museum is a museum spanning multiple historical buildings in the former village. The museum started permanently after residents of the area put their items on display as part of festivities for the Canadian and Manitoban Centennials. It displays various artifacts from the village's past, including pioneer home and farm artifacts, clothing, photographs, vehicles and war memorabilia. It also contains a blacksmith shop.

The Bren Del Win Centennial Library, whose main branch is in nearby Deloraine, has had a branch in Waskada since 2005. In addition to its collection, the branch also offers public-access computers and wireless Internet services.

=== Highways ===
Waskada is located along Manitoba Provincial Road 251, which connects to Manitoba Highway 21 at its eastern terminus, allowing access to the former town of Deloraine, as well as other communities along the highway. West of Waskada, the provincial road connects the former village to several other small communities in the area.

== Education ==
Waskada has one K-12 school, Waskada School. In the 2011-12 school year, it had 93 students.

== Notable people ==
- Roger Millions, Calgary Flames sportscaster on Sports Network West.
