= Municipality of Two Borders =

Rural municipality in Manitoba, Canada

Two Borders
- Rural municipality
- Municipality of Two Borders
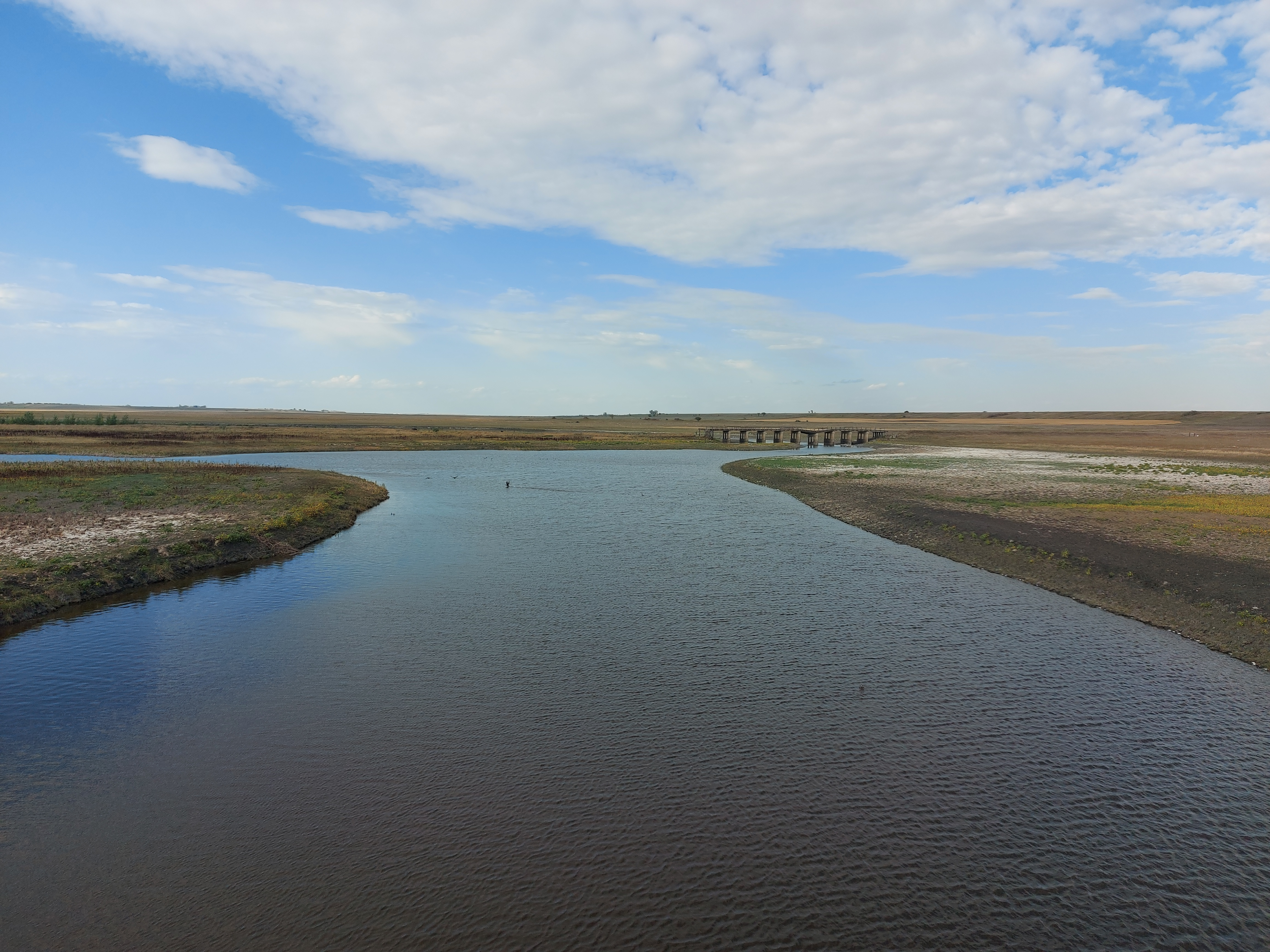
- Souris River in the Municipality of Two Borders

- Location of the Municipality of Two Borders in Manitoba
- Coordinates: 49.245°N 101.003°W
- Country: Canada
- Province: Manitoba
- Region: Westman
- Incorporated (amalgamated): 1 January 2015

Area
  - Total: 2,321.73 km^{2} (896.42 sq mi)

Population (2021)
  - Total: 1,120
  - Density: 0.482/km^{2} (1.25/sq mi)
- Time zone: UTC-6 (CST)
  - Summer (DST): UTC-5 (CDT)
- Website: twoborders.ca

The Municipality of Two Borders is a rural municipality (RM) in the Canadian province of Manitoba. It is located in the extreme south-west corner of the province in the Westman Region.

The rural municipality's name is a reference to its location abutting Manitoba's western border with the province of Saskatchewan and Manitoba's southern international border with the American state of North Dakota which makes it a tripoint. The town of Melita is located within the municipality, but is a separate urban municipality.

== History ==
The municipality was created on 1 January 2015, via the amalgamation of the RMs of Albert, Arthur and Edward. It was formed as a requirement of The Municipal Amalgamations Act, which required that municipalities with a population less than 1,000 amalgamate with one or more neighbouring municipalities by 2015. The Government of Manitoba initiated these amalgamations in order for municipalities to meet the 1997 minimum population requirement of 1,000 to incorporate a municipality. The amalgamation did not include the Town of Melita, which is surrounded by Two Borders.

=== Concrete Beam Bridge ===
In the municipality, an historic bridge, Concrete Beam Bridge No. 1351, crosses Graham Creek about 3 kilometres (1.9 mi) west of Melita. It was constructed in 1927 by John Kenward and Company for $6,443 and is on the Canadian Register of Historic Places.

== Communities ==
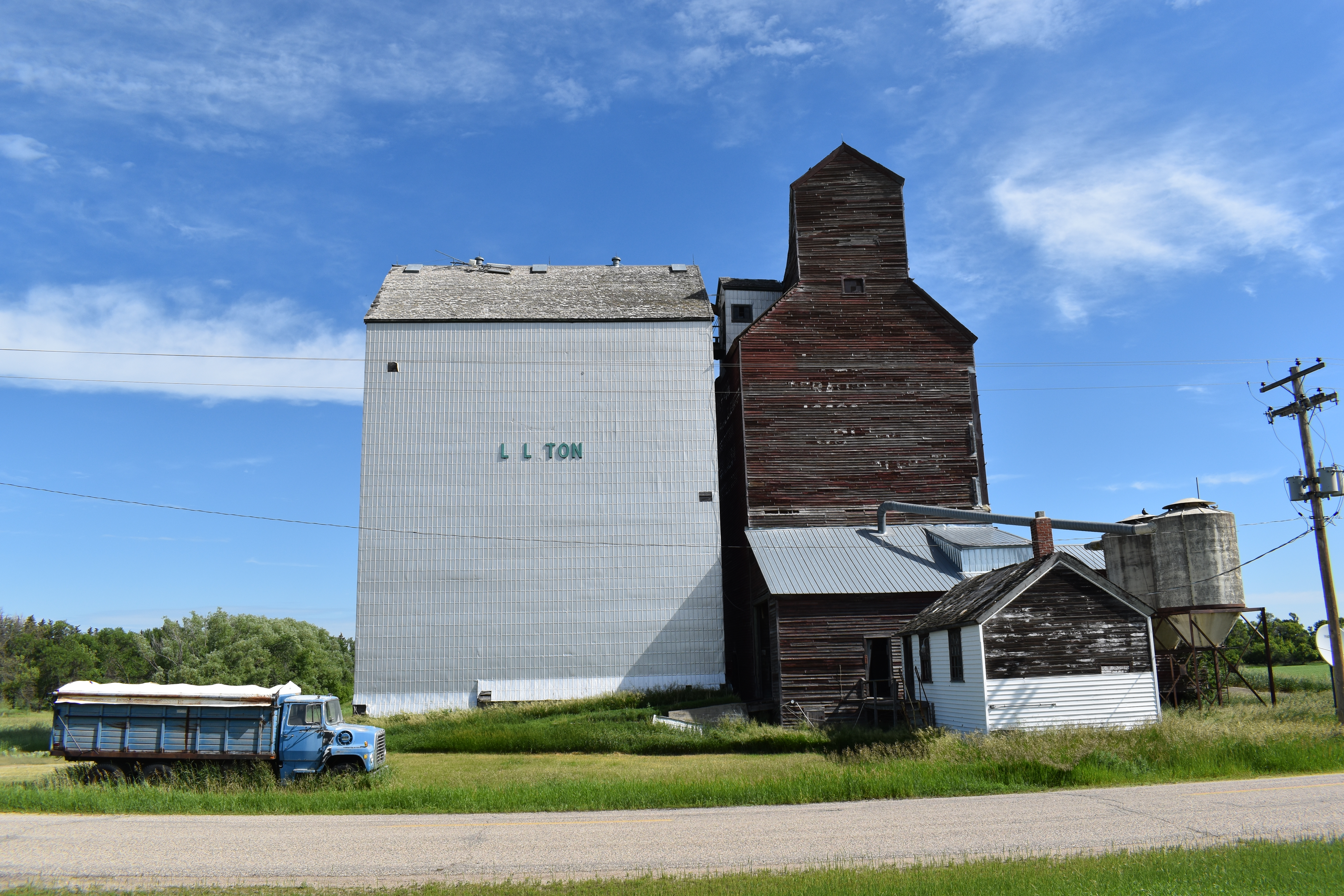
Grain elevator in Lyleton, Manitoba

- Bede
- Bernice
- Broomhill
- Elva
- Lyleton
- Pierson
- Tilston

== Demographics ==
In the 2021 Census of Population conducted by Statistics Canada, Two Borders had a population of 1,120 living in 484 of its 588 total private dwellings, a change of −4.7% from its 2016 population of 1,175. With a land area of 2,321.73 km^{2} (896.42 sq mi), it had a population density of 0.5/km^{2} (1.2/sq mi) in 2021.

== See also ==
- Antler–Lyleton Border Crossing
- Westhope–Coulter Border Crossing
- List of historic places in Westman Region, Manitoba
