= Doyle Piwniuk =

Canadian politician (born 1967)

Doyle Piwniuk MLA

Minister of Transportation and Infrastructure
- In office January 18, 2022 – October 17, 2023
- Premier: Heather Stefanson
- Preceded by: Reg Helwer
- Succeeded by: Lisa Naylor

Member of the Legislative Assembly of Manitoba for Turtle Mountain Arthur-Virden 2014-2019
- Incumbent
- Assumed office September 10, 2019
- Preceded by: first member
- In office January 28, 2014 – August 12, 2019
- Preceded by: Larry Maguire
- Succeeded by: riding dissolved

Personal details
- Born: March 7, 1967 (age 59)
- Party: Progressive Conservative
- Education: Red River College Polytechnic
- Occupation: Insurance broker

Doyle Piwniuk (/pɪˈnjuːk/ pin-YOOK) is a Canadian politician, who was elected to the Manitoba Legislative Assembly in a by-election on January 28, 2014. He represents the electoral district of Turtle Mountain as a member of the Progressive Conservative Party of Manitoba (PCs).

Prior to his election to the legislature, Piwniuk was an insurance broker and financial planner in Virden. He began his political service in opposition, and served in the party's shadow cabinet as critic for multiculturalism and literacy. He was re-elected in provincewide general elections in 2016 and 2019, in which the PCs won government, and in 2023 when the party lost government to the NDP. On October 24, 2023, he was appointed as the Shadow Minister for Manitoba Public Insurance.

== Electoral record ==
2023 Manitoba general election: Turtle Mountain
| Party | Candidate | Votes | % | ±% | Expenditures |
|---|---|---|---|---|---|
| Progressive Conservative | Doyle Piwniuk | 4,806 | 55.05 | -12.43 | $12,216.90 |
| New Democratic | Lorna Canada-Vanegas Mesa | 1,993 | 22.83 | +11.93 | $1,865.92 |
| Keystone | Kevin Friesen | 1,507 | 17.26 | – | $5,551.67 |
| Liberal | Ali Tarar | 425 | 4.87 | -1.85 | $2,444.23 |
| Total valid votes/expense limit | | 8,731 | 99.36 | – | $61,679.00 |
| Total rejected and declined ballots | | 56 | 0.64 | – | |
| Turnout | | 8,787 | 55.64 | -1.65 | |
| Eligible voters | | 15,794 | | | |
| Progressive Conservative hold | | Swing | | -12.18 | |
Source(s) Source: Elections Manitoba

2019 Manitoba general election: Turtle Mountain
| Party | Candidate | Votes | % | ±% | Expenditures |
|---|---|---|---|---|---|
| Progressive Conservative | Doyle Piwniuk | 6,210 | 67.48 | -8.7 | $6,900.23 |
| Green | David Neufeld | 1,372 | 14.91 | 11.5 | $124.08 |
| New Democratic | Angie Herrera-Hildebrand | 1,003 | 10.90 | 2.2 | $636.58 |
| Liberal | Richard Davies | 618 | 6.72 | 2.3 | $435.68 |
| Total valid votes | | 9,203 | – | – | |
| Rejected | | 80 | – | | |
| Eligible voters / turnout | | 16,206 | 57.28 | 2.89 | |
Source(s) Source: Manitoba. Chief Electoral Officer (2019). Statement of Votes for the 42nd Provincial General Election, September 10, 2019 (PDF) (Report). Winnipeg: Elections Manitoba. "Candidate Election Returns". Elections Manitoba.

2016 Manitoba general election: Arthur-Virden
| Party | Candidate | Votes | % | ±% | Expenditures |
|---|---|---|---|---|---|
| Progressive Conservative | Doyle Piwniuk | 6,006 | 80.59 | +12.39 | $20,684.63 |
| Manitoba | Frank Godon | 846 | 11.35 | +11.35 | $4,340.23 |
| New Democratic | Lorne M. Topolniski | 600 | 8.05 | -2.38 | $146.90 |
| Total valid votes/expense limit | | 7,452 | 100.0 | | $ |
| Eligible voters | | – | | | |
Source: Elections Manitoba

Manitoba provincial by-election, January 28, 2014: Arthur-Virden
| Party | Candidate | Votes | % | ±% | Expenditures |
|---|---|---|---|---|---|
| Progressive Conservative | Doyle Piwniuk | 3,137 | 68.20 | +2.23 | 15,355.65 |
| Liberal | Floyd Buhler | 738 | 16.04 | +12.23 | 6,463.77 |
| New Democratic | Bob Senff | 480 | 10.43 | -19.78 | 6,318.45 |
| Green | Kate Storey | 245 | 5.33 | | 0.00 |
| Total valid votes | | 4,600 | 100.00 | | |
| Rejected and declined votes | | 10 | | | |
| Turnout | | 4,610 | 33.55 | | |
| Electors on the lists | | 13,739 | | | |
| Progressive Conservative hold | | Swing | | -5.00 | |
