= Melita, Manitoba =

Town in Manitoba, Canada

Melita
- Town
- Aerial view (2026)

- Town boundaries

- Location within Manitoba
- Coordinates: 49°16′05″N 100°59′45″W
- Country: Canada
- Province: Manitoba

Area
  - Metro: 2.97 km^{2} (1.15 sq mi)

Population (2016)
  - Town: 1,042
  - Density: 342.7/km^{2} (888/sq mi)
- Time zone: UTC−5 (CST)
  - Summer (DST): UTC−6 (CDT)

Melita (/məˈlɪtə/) is a town located in the south-western corner of the Canadian province of Manitoba. It is surrounded by the Municipality of Two Borders and occupies a bend of the Souris River. Graham Creek runs along the west side of town and into the Souris River. The population at the 2016 census was 1,042. It sits at the junction of Highways 3 and 83, approximately 320 km southwest of Winnipeg. Melita is known as the "Grasslands Bird Capital of Manitoba" and is located in Manitoba's banana belt.

== History ==
Evidence of First Nations habitation in the area includes the Linear Mounds Archaeological Site and the Brockinton Archaeological Site, which have provided artifacts dating back to 800 AD. The site has been designated a National Historic Site of Canada.

Charles West was the first recorded European settler, in 1879. The early inhabitants chose the name "Melita" for the town after hearing a Bible reading (Acts 28:1) about St. Paul's shipwreck on the island of Malta (Melita is an older name for the island).

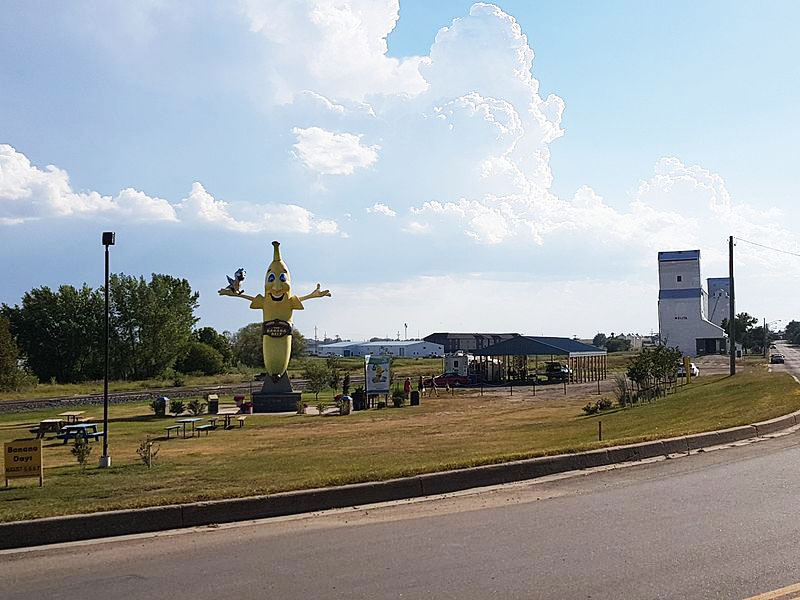
Front Street

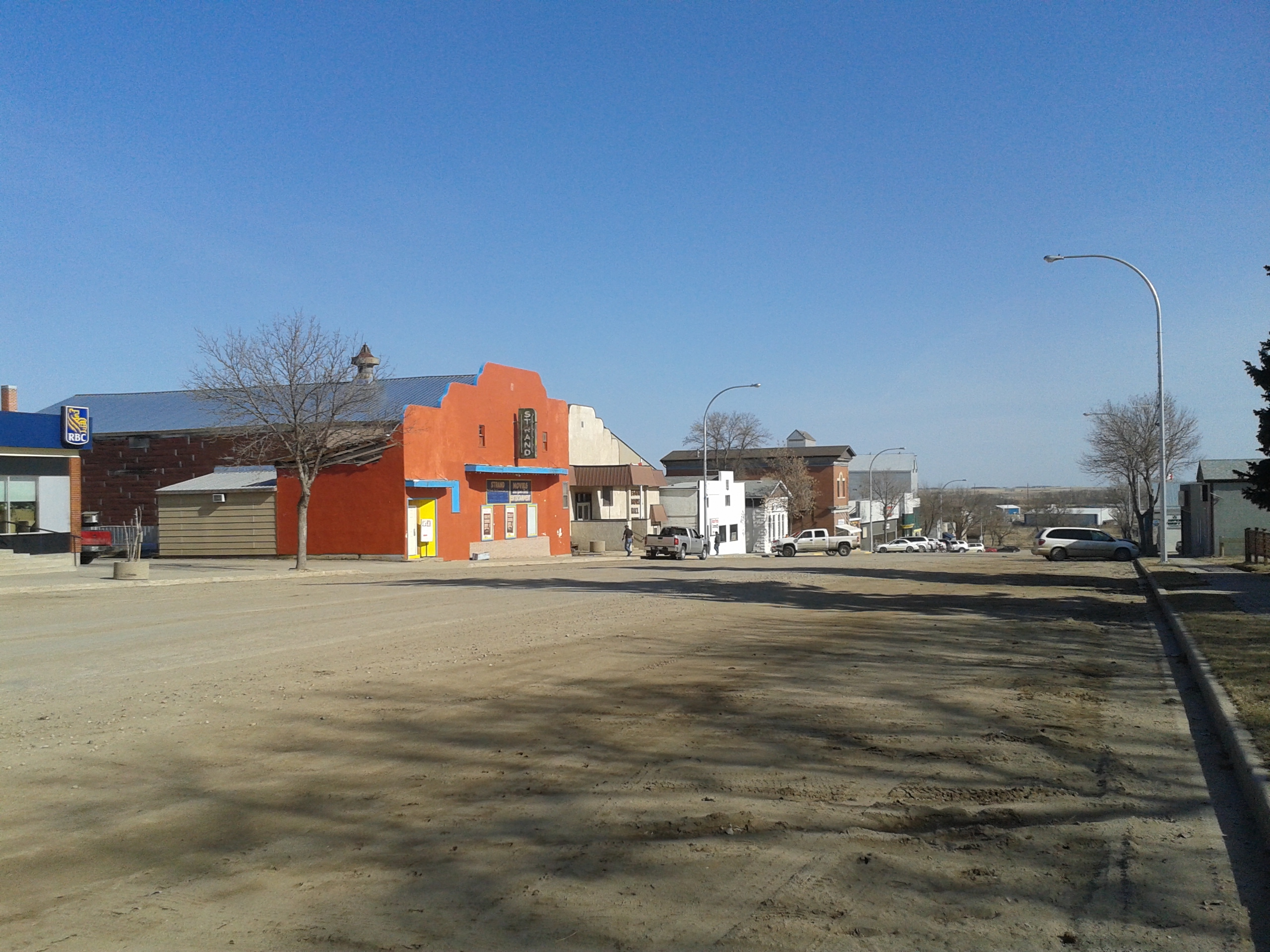
Main Street (2014)

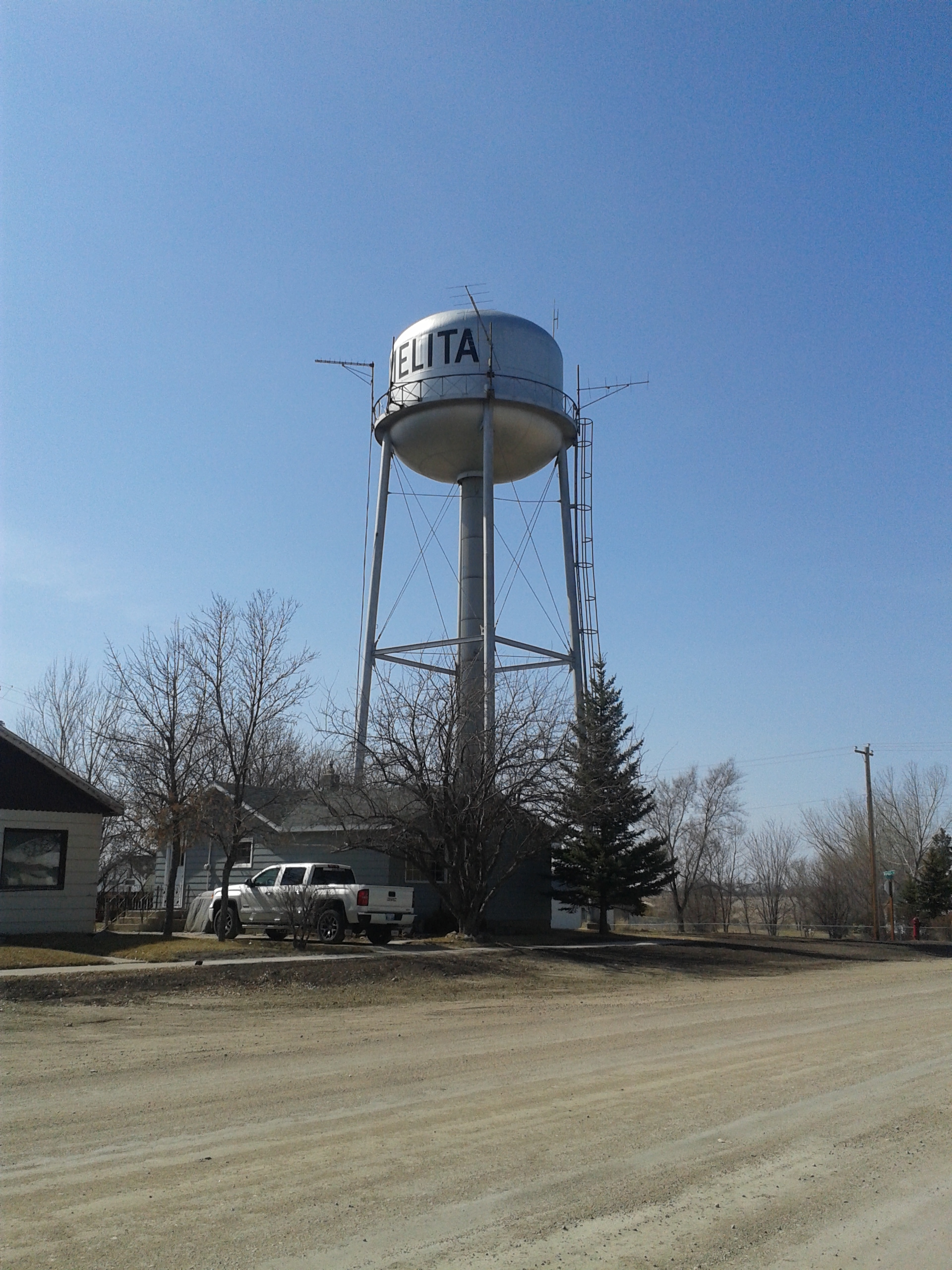
Water tower

== Demographics ==
In the 2021 Census of Population conducted by Statistics Canada, Melita had a population of 1,041 living in 465 of its 548 total private dwellings, a change of −0.1% from its 2016 population of 1,042. With a land area of 3.19 km^{2} (1.23 sq mi), it had a population density of 326.3/km^{2} (845.2/sq mi) in 2021.

== Notable people ==
- James Breakey, politician
- John Cobb, politician
- Jim Downey, politician
- Betty Fox, cancer research activist and mother of Terry Fox; raised in Melita
- Wayne Hall, professional hockey player
- Kory Karlander, professional hockey player
- J. Arthur Ross, politician

== See also ==
- Melita Airport
- Westhope–Coulter Border Crossing
