= 106.5 FM =

FM radio frequency

The following radio stations broadcast on FM frequency 106.5 MHz:

== Argentina ==
- El Signo in Rosario, Santa Fe
- LRM437 del Rey in Reconquista, Santa Fe
- LRM700 Sytlo in Gobernador Crespo, Santa Fe
- Radio María in Juan José Castelli, Chaco

== Australia ==
- 3MRR in Wodonga, Victoria
- 4ISA in Mount Isa, Queensland
- Hit Western Australia in Albany, Western Australia
- 2WFM in Sydney, New South Wales
- Ultra106five in Hobart, Tasmania

== Brazil ==
- Novabrasil Fortaleza (ZYC 421) in Fortaleza, Ceará

== Canada (Channel 293) ==
- CBHM-FM in Middleton, Nova Scotia
- CBYV-FM in Vernon, British Columbia
- CFEI-FM in St-Hyacinthe, Quebec
- CFPT-FM in Toronto, Ontario
- CHBV-FM in Houston, British Columbia
- CHBY-FM in Barry's Bay, Ontario
- CHMN-FM in Canmore, Alberta
- CHMN-FM-1 in Banff, Alberta
- CIFN-FM in Island Lake, Saskatchewan
- CIRO-FM in Osoyoos, British Columbia
- CIXK-FM in Owen Sound, Ontario
- CJJJ-FM in Brandon, Manitoba
- VF2497 in Cranbrook, British Columbia
- VF2555 in Dawson Creek, British Columbia
- VF6010 in Prince George, British Columbia
- VF8022 in Crabtree, Quebec

== China ==
- CNR China Traffic Radio in Taiyuan
- CNR Music Radio in Yanji

== Indonesia ==
- Sing FM in Batam & Singapore

== Israel ==
- Galei Yisrael in the Judea and Samaria Area

== Malaysia ==
- Melody in Kedah, Perlis & Penang

== Mexico ==
- XHDFM-FM in Mexico City
- XHGV-FM in Querétaro, Querétaro
- XHIG-FM in Iguala, Guerrero
- XHLK-FM in Zacatecas, Zacatecas
- XHSCCK-FM in Salina Cruz, Oaxaca
- XHSCJB-FM in Tepakán, Calkiní Municipality, Campeche
- XHXP-FM in San Juan Bautista Tuxtepec, Oaxaca
- XHZCN-FM in Saltillo, Coahuila
- XHZUL-FM in Cerro Azul, Veracruz

== United Kingdom ==
- Capital Manchester and Lancashire in Preston
- Hits Radio Bristol & The South West in Bristol
- Welsh Coast Radio in Swansea
- WK-END - Pirate Radio in London

== Turkey ==
- TRT Radyo Haber in Karaman

== United States (Channel 293) ==
- KAHS-LP in Aberdeen, Washington
- KALT-FM in Alturas, California
- KAVI-LP in La Junta, Colorado
- KBVA in Bella Vista, Arkansas
- KCQQ in Davenport, Iowa
- KEAL in Taft, California
- KEGT in San Miguel, California
- KEGX in Richland, Washington
- KELD-FM in Hampton, Arkansas
- KEND in Roswell, New Mexico
- KESW-LP in Whitehall, Montana
- KEZR in San Jose, California
- KFMC-FM in Fairmont, Minnesota
- KGIH-LP in Abilene, Kansas
- KHUK in Granite Shoals, Texas
- KITC-LP in Gilchrist, Oregon
- KITT in Meridian, Texas
- KIXA in Lucerne Valley, California
- KKIK in Horseshoe Bend, Arkansas
- KKMR in Arizona City, Arizona
- KLDU-LP in Laredo, Texas
- KLFN in Sunburg, Minnesota
- KLNQ in Atlanta, Louisiana
- KLNV in San Diego, California
- KMCX-FM in Ogallala, Nebraska
- KMKP-LP in Holdrege, Nebraska
- KMMT in Mammoth Lakes, California
- KOOI in Jacksonville, Texas
- KOVE-FM in Galveston, Texas
- KPEP in Eldorado, Texas
- KQWZ-LP in Seatac, Washington
- KQXL-FM in New Roads, Louisiana
- KRJB in Ada, Minnesota
- KRYL in Haiku, Hawaii
- KSEJ-LP in Victoria, Texas
- KSNE-FM in Las Vegas, Nevada
- KFIO in Dishman, Washington
- KTLS-FM in Holdenville, Oklahoma
- KTMO (FM) in New Madrid, Missouri
- KUDL in Sacramento, California
- KUOM-FM in Saint Louis Park, Minnesota
- KVVC-LP in Vallejo, California
- KWFG-FM in Knox City, Texas
- KWHL in Anchorage, Alaska
- KWPZ in Lynden, Washington
- KXXF in Springer, New Mexico
- KYRK in Taft, Texas
- KXTQ-FM in Lubbock, Texas
- KXZX-LP in Juilliard, Texas
- KYPX in Helena Valley SE, Montana
- KYQQ in Arkansas City, Kansas
- WAGE-LP in Oak Hill, West Virginia
- WAID in Clarksdale, Mississippi
- WARH in Granite City, Illinois
- WAVH in Daphne, Alabama
- WBMW in Pawcatuck, Connecticut
- WBTJ in Richmond, Virginia
- WBTP in Sarasota, Florida
- WCFT-FM in Bloomsburg, Pennsylvania
- WCJX in Five Points, Florida
- WDAF-FM in Liberty, Missouri
- WDSN in Reynoldsville, Pennsylvania
- WEND in Salisbury, North Carolina
- WFHC-LP in Hendersonville, North Carolina
- WFMP-LP in Louisville, Kentucky
- WHBZ in Sheboygan Falls, Wisconsin
- WHII-LP in Warminster, Pennsylvania
- WHJX in Ponte Vedra Beach, Florida
- WHLK in Cleveland, Ohio
- WJDT in Rogersville, Tennessee
- WJEC (FM) in Vernon, Alabama
- WJVA-LP in Portsmouth, Virginia
- WKCH in Whitewater, Wisconsin
- WKDZ-FM in Cadiz, Kentucky
- WKKM-LP in Harrison, Michigan
- WKRH in Fair Haven, New York
- WLFF in Georgetown, South Carolina
- WLVS-FM in Clifton, Tennessee
- WMCD in Rocky Ford, Georgia
- WMEF in Fort Kent, Maine
- WNHI in Farmington, New Hampshire
- WNIK-FM in Arecibo, Puerto Rico
- WOYS in Carrabelle, Florida
- WPPM-LP in Philadelphia, Pennsylvania
- WPYX in Albany, New York
- WQCB in Brewer, Maine
- WQLX in Chillicothe, Ohio
- WRBG-LP in Millsboro, Delaware
- WRDY-LP in Eagleville, Pennsylvania
- WRLV-FM in Salyersville, Kentucky
- WSFL-FM in New Bern, North Carolina
- WSKZ in Chattanooga, Tennessee
- WTHJ in Bass River Township, New Jersey
- WTKD in Greenville, Ohio
- WTOD in Delta, Ohio
- WVFM in Kalamazoo, Michigan
- WWBL in Washington, Indiana
- WWLW in Clarksburg, West Virginia
- WWMX in Baltimore, Maryland
- WXMP-LP in Cordova, Tennessee
- WXNU in Saint Anne, Illinois
- WYRK in Buffalo, New York
- WYTE in Marshfield, Wisconsin
- WZIQ in Smithville, Georgia
- WZNJ in Demopolis, Alabama
