= Oak Lake, Manitoba =

Oak Lake
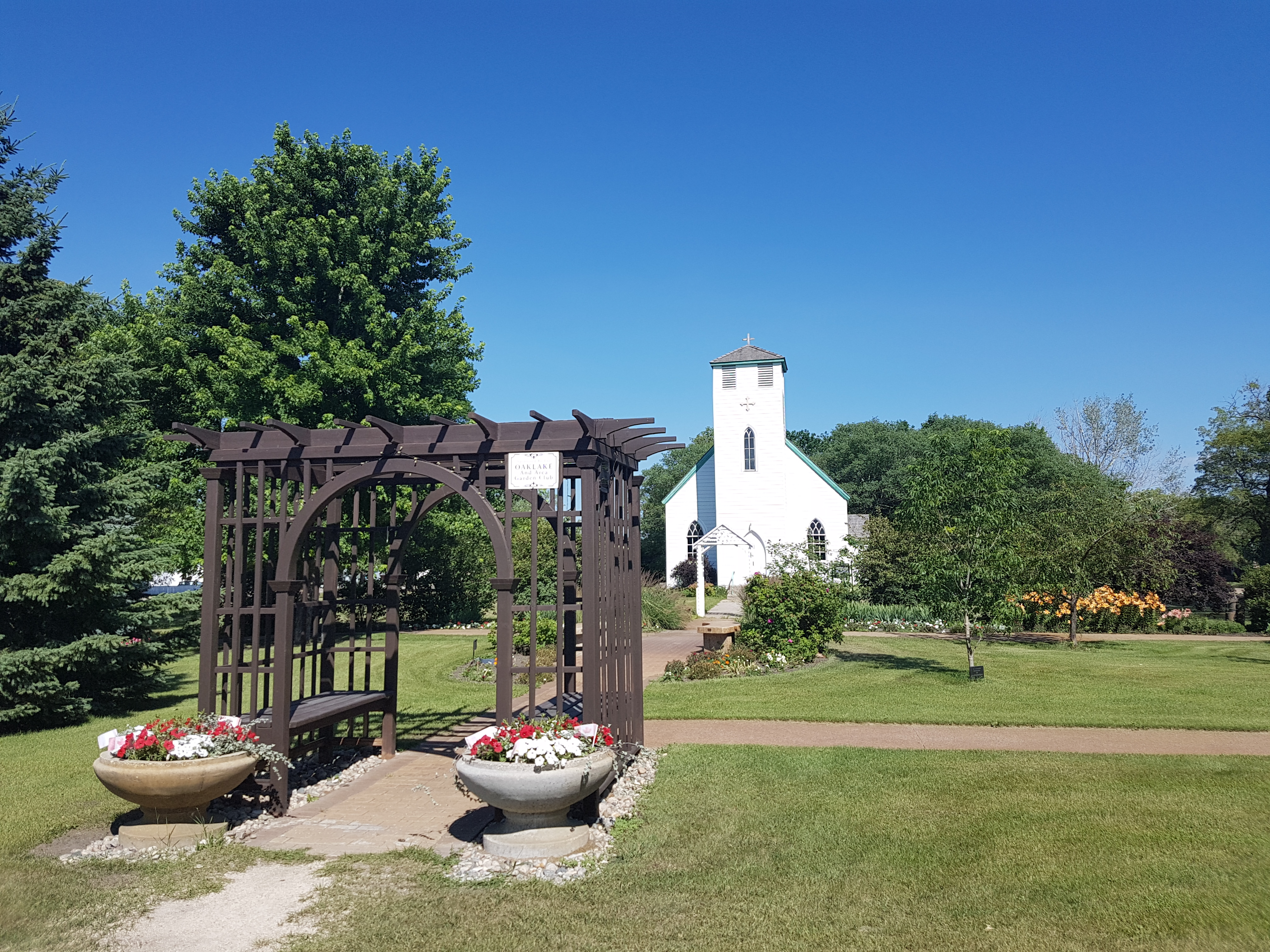

- Location within Manitoba
- Coordinates: 49°45′59″N 100°37′41″W
- Country: Canada
- Province: Manitoba
- Region: Westman Region
- Rural municipality: R.M. of Sifton
- Established: 1882
- Incorporated: July 15, 1907
- Annexation: January 1, 2015

Government
  - MP: Grant Jackson - Conservative
  - MLA: Colleen Robbins

Area
  - Total: 2.63 km^{2} (1.02 sq mi)

Population (Canada 2016 Census)
  - Total: 407
  - Density: 154.7/km^{2} (401/sq mi)
- Time zone: UTC-6 (Central (CST))
  - Summer (DST): UTC-5 (Central (CDT))
- Postal code: R0M 1P0
- Area codes: 204, 431

Oak Lake is an unincorporated urban community in the Rural Municipality of Sifton within the Canadian province of Manitoba that held town status prior to January 1, 2015. It is located 52 km (32 mi) west of Brandon along the Trans-Canada Highway. The lake after which it was named is in the rural municipality's western area.

During the late 19th century, the area around Oak Lake was a popular stopping point for fur traders and settlers due to the large number of big oak trees (revered for their strength) located around the lake that could be used to repair their wagons.

In the fall of 1881, work crews on the transcontinental Canadian Pacific Railway had reached Flat Creek to the east of the current townsite. In the spring they moved the camp west and built a siding and station (now long gone) where the community's flags and flower garden are now located.

== Geography and climate ==
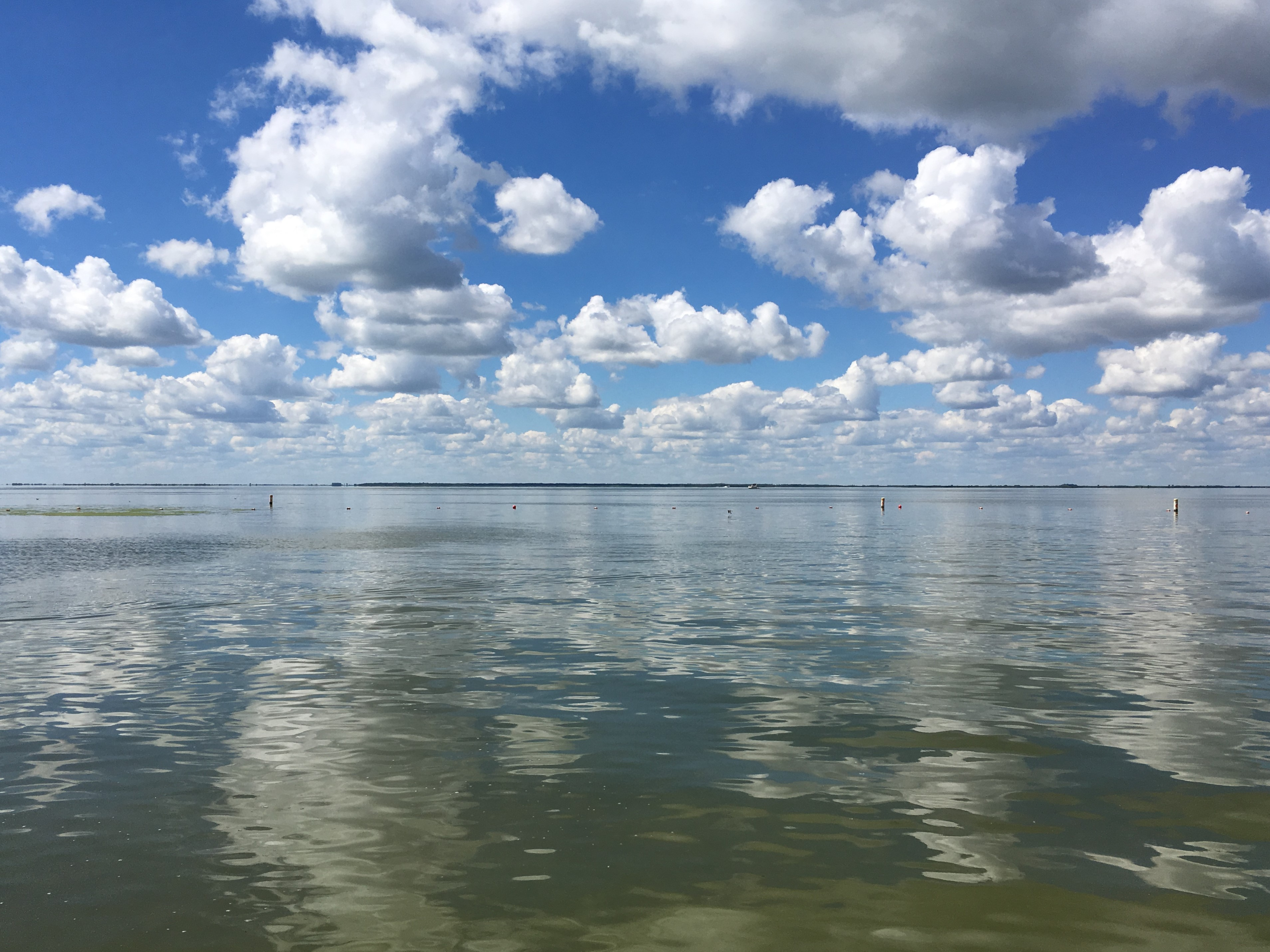
Oak Lake, Manitoba

The area around Oak Lake is dominated by the Assiniboine River, the nearby lake by the same name, areas of flat farm land, and to the north, large, rolling hills left by receding glaciers. Oak Lake's location in the middle of the Canadian prairies means that Oak Lake experiences an extreme continental climate. The area is known for its long, cold winters owing to its northerly location. There is often much snowfall during the winter, with the possibility for blizzards that can drop in excess of 35 cm (~14 inches) of snow at once, which can be blown into drifts that are much deeper. The community can be cut off for a day or more while snow is cleared from the highways.

Temperatures during the coldest winter months of December, January and February can reach -35 °C (-31 °F), though colder temperatures occasionally occur. Windchills during the winter can reach as cold as -45 °C (-49 °F), making outdoor activity difficult on those days. The average winter temperature is a more moderate -12 °C (10.4 °F). Winters are often characterized by extreme shifts in temperature with near 0 °C (32 °F) changing to frigid temperatures within the span of a few days. Summers are often very warm with the possibility of temperatures in excess of 35 °C (95 °F), though the average summer temperature is 26 °C (78.8 °F). Year round, Oak Lake has an abundance of clear, sunny skies.

== Economy ==
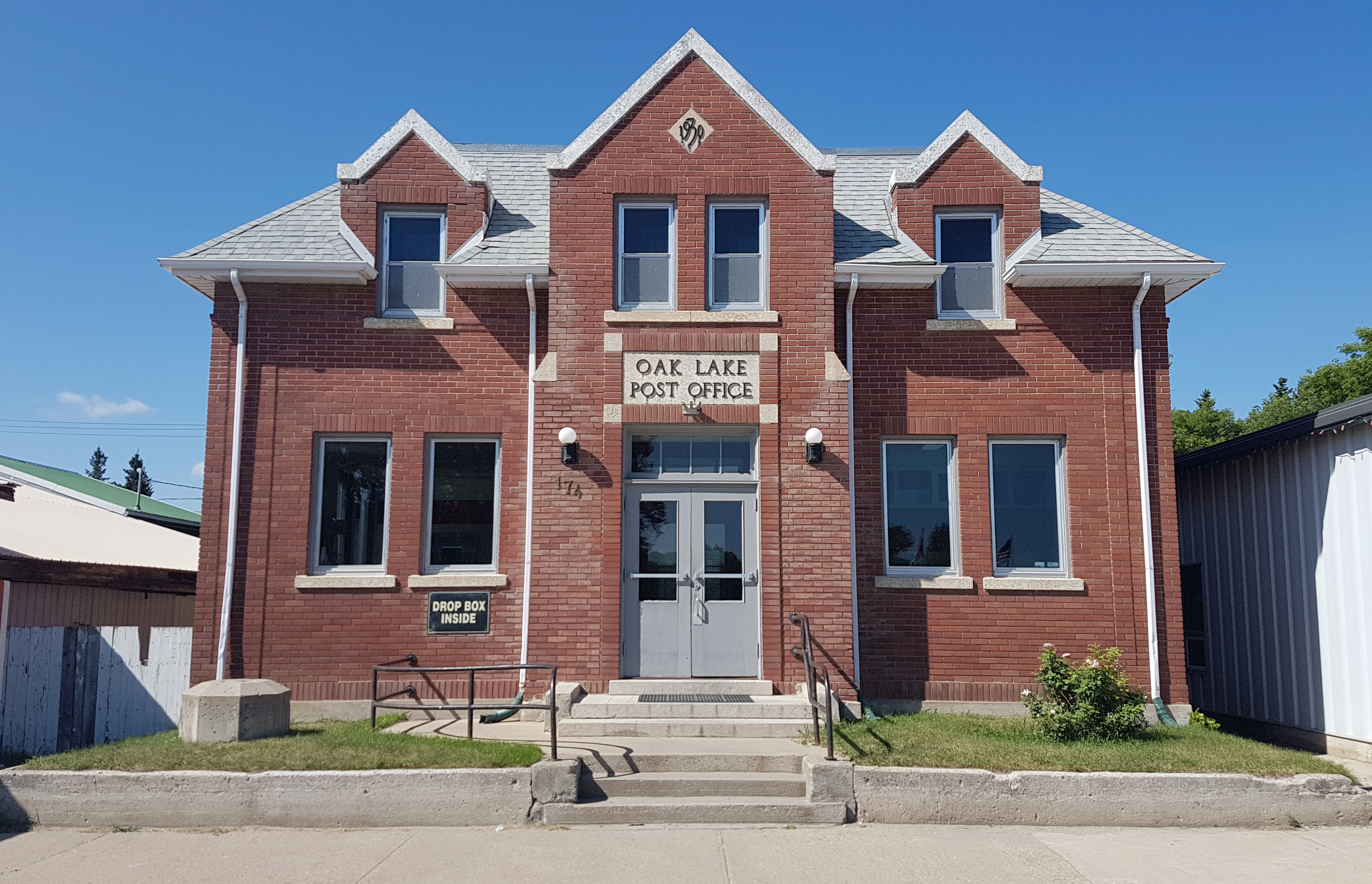
The Post Office building in Oak Lake, constructed in 1930.

The economy of the Oak Lake area is dominated by farming, although nearby Virden has a booming oil economy. The rural municipality office is located in Oak Lake, which employs a handful of people to manage the running of public services. Other employers include the Valleyview CO-OP grocery store, Golden Embers restaurant, Dandy's confectionery, and several smaller, personal businesses.

Basic groceries and household items can be purchased from the Co-op. Other locations for shopping are Virden, 15 minutes away, Brandon, 30 minutes away, and for rare items, Winnipeg and Minot each 2 1/2 hours away. Oak Lake has the seasonal Dandy's Drive In and Golden Embers. Virden and Brandon have a number of casual and fine dining restaurants as well.

== Demographics ==
In the 2021 Census of Population conducted by Statistics Canada, Oak Lake had a population of 381 living in 155 of its 172 total private dwellings, a change of −6.4% from its 2016 population of 407. With a land area of 2.61 km^{2} (1.01 sq mi), it had a population density of 146.0/km^{2} (378.1/sq mi) in 2021.

Oak Lake's population is mostly white, with few visible minorities other than a small Indigenous population. The nearby Sioux Valley Dakota Nation and Canupawakpa Dakota Nation are homes to a large community of First Nations people.

== Education ==
Oak Lake Community School is the only school in Oak Lake. It is part of the Fort La Bosse School Division, and has grades K-8. Students in their senior years (grades 9-12) take a daily 15 minute bus ride to nearby Virden Collegiate Institute in Virden. The closest post secondary educational facilities are in Brandon; Brandon University (BU) and Assiniboine Community College (ACC).

== Transportation ==
The main method of transportation in Oak Lake is car. For people who live and work in community, walking or biking is common when the weather permits. The nearest domestic airport is Virden/R.J. (Bob) Andrew Field Regional Aerodrome, and the nearest one with scheduled service is Brandon Municipal Airport. The closest international airport is the Winnipeg James Armstrong Richardson International Airport, although Regina International Airport in Regina, Saskatchewan is only marginally further away. There is no commuter rail service to Oak Lake, although Via Rail has a stop in Brandon.

== Sports and recreation ==
Oak Lake Golf Course is nine holes long with cart and club rentals available. Camping is available in the community. During the winter, there are plenty of opportunities for snowmobiling, skating (including figure skating), skiing and ice fishing.

=== Hockey ===
Hockey is the biggest sport in the community, with an active minor league program. The local arena and hockey program has greatly benefited from the installation of an ice plant. Ice rentals by teams from Brandon are common. Oxen Cart Bandits is the moniker used by teams in younger age groups. The Oak Lake Icemen participate in the Manitoba North Central Hockey League senior level. There are junior hockey programs available in Virden and Souris. Virden Collegiate has a male high school hockey program.

The closest major hockey franchise is the Brandon Wheat Kings who play in the Western Hockey League. The nearest NHL franchise is the Winnipeg Jets.

=== Baseball ===
Oak Lake formerly had a baseball program, but it has seen decline in recent years. The closest active baseball program can be found in Virden. Virden Collegiate has male and female high school baseball programs.

Gymnastics: Sifton Gymnastic's started in 2022 and runs from fall to spring with short 8 sessions and multiple classes that run throughout the program. Rachelle Stannage coaches all the teams that range from toddlers(3 years of age) to 14 years of age.

=== Football ===
Brandon has a youth football team, while Virden Collegiate Institute's Golden Bears football team participates in the Rural Manitoba Football League.

=== Curling ===
There are several regional curling competitions in Oak Lake and surrounding communities. Virden Collegiate also fields a curling team for high school competition.

=== Volleyball ===
Volleyball is a school sport at both Oak Lake Community School (whose team name is the Oak Lake Raptors) and at Virden Collegiate. There is also a regional league for males and females.

=== Basketball ===
Basketball is a school sport at both Oak Lake Community School and Virden Collegiate.

== Entertainment and media ==
=== Television ===
Oak Lake is serviced by Persona Communications cable television, which offers 25 channels. Reception of satellite TV is excellent, due to the flat landscape devoid of large obstructions, therefore services such as Bell Satellite TV work for more channels. Over the air reception is available from the following stations:

- Channel 2 – CKND-2 - Global, a repeater of Global Winnipeg.
- Channel 4 – CKYB - CTV, a repeater of CKY-TV Winnipeg.
- Channel 21 – CBWFT - Societé Radio-Canada, a repeater of CBWFT Winnipeg.

=== Radio ===
- 91.5 CIWM – NCI – Native Communications Inc. (community/aboriginal)
- 92.7 CBWS – CBC Radio 2 – classical music
- 94.7 CKLF – Star FM – adult contemporary
- 96.1 CKX-FM – 96.1 BOB FM – adult hits
- 97.9 CBWV – CBC Radio One – News/Information
- 99.5 CKSB-8 – Première Chaîne – French News/Information
- 101.1 CKXA – 101 The Farm – country
- 103.3 CJVM – CJ103 Radio – country and local news
- 106.5 CJJJ – CJ106 – Assiniboine Community College campus radio
- 880 CKLQ – country – official sportscast of the Brandon Wheat Kings

=== Newspapers ===
The Oak Lake Town and Country News is the community's current paper detailing local happenings. The Brandon Sun is the only home delivered regional, national and international newspaper in the area.

=== Theatres ===
Virden's Aud theatre is the closest live performance theatre.

== Notable people ==
- Maurice Strong (born April 29, 1929 - died November 28, 2015) - industrialist, diplomat and Under-Secretary General of the UN, first Executive Director of the United Nations Environment Programme, recipient of the Tyler Prize for Environmental Achievement
- Ted Taylor (born February 25, 1942) - hockey player, played in the WHA and NHL
- Don Larway (born February 12, 1954) - hockey player, played in the WHA, signed to NHL but never played
