= KITC =

KITC may refer to:

- KITC-LP, a low-power radio station (106.5 FM) licensed to Gilchrist, Oregon, United States
- Kingston Institute of Tamil Culture
- Korea International Travel Company, North Korea's state-run tourism bureau; see Tourism in North Korea
