= Oak Lake (Manitoba) =

Lake in Manitoba, Canada

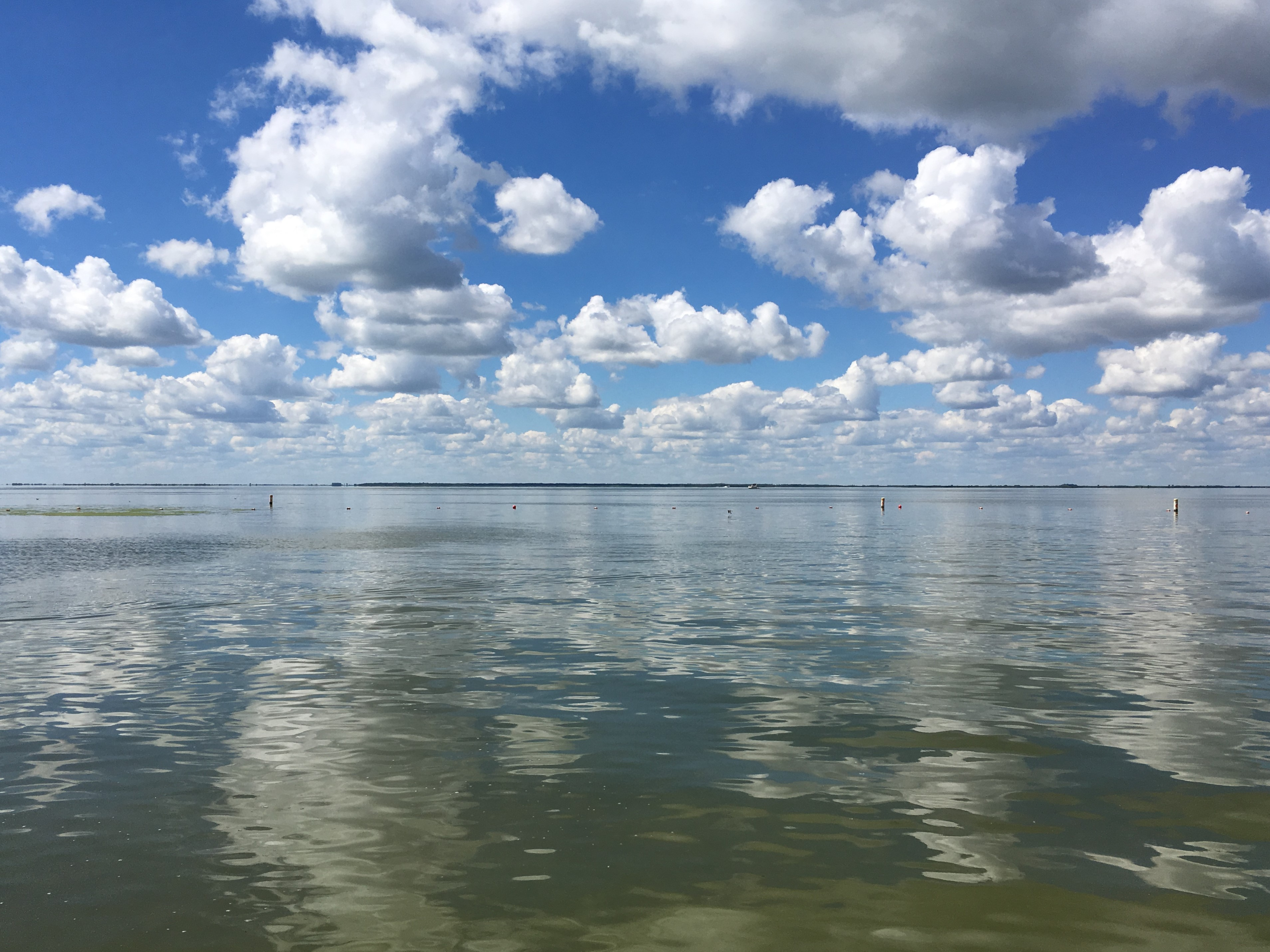
- Oak Lake

- Location of the lake in Manitoba Oak Lake (Canada)
- Location: Manitoba
- Coordinates: 49°40′17″N 100°44′34″W
- Primary inflows: Pipestone Creek
- Primary outflows: Plum Lakes
- Basin countries: Canada
- Max. length: 8 km (5.0 mi)
- Surface area: 39 km^{2} (15 sq mi)
- Max. depth: 2.5 m (8 ft 2 in)
- Surface elevation: 426 m (1,398 ft)
- Settlements: Oak Lake Beach

Oak Lake (Dakota: Wiyaṭeca Kaksiza) is a lake in the southwestern region of the Canadian province of Manitoba.

Oak Lake is a kettle lake and is an aquifer supplier for numerous nearby residential areas and farms. The lake is in the RM of Sifton and sits at an elevation of 426 metres (1,398 ft) above sea level. Provincial Road 254 provides access to the lake.

At 39 km^{2} (15 sq mi), Oak Lake is the largest lake in the region and its primary surface inflow is Pipestone Creek, which originates in Saskatchewan. Pipestone Creek enters the lake in the northwest corner through Oak Lake Marsh, which itself is four times the size of Oak Lake.

At the southern end of the lake is Oak Lake Dam (49°38′27″N, 100°45′8″W). While Oak Lake is not a man-made lake, the dam is used to regulate water levels. Water flows past the dam and into the Plum Lakes, which in turn are drained by Plum Creek and on into the Souris River. The Souris River is part of the Red River drainage basin, which is part of the Hudson Bay drainage basin.

There are no large settlements on the lake. On the north shore is Cherry Point and along the eastern shore is Oak Lake Beach. The community of Oak Lake is about 10 km (6.2 mi) away as the crow flies, or about 16 km (9.9 mi) by car. Brandon, the closest major city, is 70 kilometres (43 mi) away.

The traditional name of this lake in the Dakota language is Wiyaṭeca Kaksiza, which can be translated as "Cranberry Hollow".

== Parks and recreation ==
Besides the two communities on the lake, there is Oak Lake Provincial Park, a marina, and Oak Island Resort. The resort features full-service camping, 18-hole mini golf, a swimming pool, and an 18-hole golf course. The provincial park is a day-use park that has two playgrounds for kids, beach access, walking trails, baseball diamonds, a basketball court, beach volleyball, and group shelters for picnics.

Oak Lake Beach, the marina, Oak Island Resort, and Oak Lake Provincial Park, are all on Oak Lake Island, which is an island that makes up much of the eastern side of the lake. It is connected to the mainland by a causeway. The whole lake itself is designated Oak Lake Canada Goose Refuge and at the south end of the lake is Oak Lake Game Bird Refuge.

Nearby, to the east are the Oak Lake Sand Hills, which are a Nature Conservancy of Canada protected site; to the south are the Lauder Sand Hills, which are a Wildlife Management Area; and to the south-east are the Souris Sand Hills.

Oak Lake, Oak Lake Marsh, Maple Lake, Plum Lakes, and Lauder Sand Hills, are all part of Important Bird Area (IBA) Canada called Oak Lake / Plum Lakes Area. This IBA is a very important breeding ground and stop-over for migrating birds and it covers 654.07 km^{2} (252.54 sq mi) of habitat.

== Oak Lake Aquifer ==
Oak Lake Aquifer is an aquifer in the Westman Region of Manitoba. It rests on sandy silt, which is underlain by clay and shale bedrock. The total area covered by the aquifer is 2,072 km^{2} (800 sq mi) and it contains over 3 million acre-feet of water. The aquifer stretches from the Assiniboine River near the community of Oak Lake in the north to the Souris River and Broomhill in the south to Souris in the east and Virden, Reston, and Tilston in the west. Major bodies of water on the surface above the aquifer include Oak Lake, Oak Lake Marsh, Plum Lakes, Plum Creek, Maple Lake, Pipestone Creek, and Stony Creek. Besides rain and snow melt, Pipestone and Stony Creeks supply most of the water to the aquifer.

Oak Lake Aquifer supplies drinking water to 3,800 people in several communities, tens of thousands of livestock, and irrigates farmland. The region falls under the Souris River Watershed Conservation District to ensure the stability and management of water levels and quality.

== See also ==
- List of lakes of Manitoba
