= WWBL =

- Washington, Indiana, US; United States
- Frequency: 106.5 MHz
- Branding: The Bullet 106.5

Programming
- Format: Real Country

Ownership
- Owner: The Original Company

History
- First air date: 1948
- Former call signs: WRTB-FM

Technical information
- Licensing authority: FCC
- Facility ID: 50239
- Class: B
- ERP: 50 kWs
- HAAT: 104 meters (341 ft)

Links
- Public license information: Public file; LMS
- Website: WWBL Website

WWBL is an FM radio station licensed to the city of Washington, Indiana, United States. The station broadcasts the Real Country format from ABC Radio Networks. WWBL is branded as The Bullet 106.5.

WWBL signed on in 1948.

== History ==
WwBL began as WFML, owned by Paul & Helen Bausman, who also owned the local newspaper. The facility was upgraded for a more powerful service to the 50 kW signal used today by 1979.

In 1986, WFML was sold to Greene Broadcasting, who installed a Top 40 format and the call sign WRTB.

After Robert Greene's death in 1991, the station was sold again to Old Northwest Broadcasting, who changed the format to country and call sign to the present WWBL in 1993.
