= XHIG-FM =

Radio station in Iguala, Guerrero, Mexico

Iguala, Guerrero; Mexico
- Frequency: 106.5 MHz
- Branding: La Grande de Iguala

Programming
- Format: Full-service

Ownership
- Owner: Radio Cadena Nacional; (Radio Iguala, S.A. de C.V.)

History
- First air date: August 6, 1960 (concession)
- Call sign meaning: First two letters of Iguala

Technical information
- ERP: 12.5 kW
- HAAT: -137.7 m
- Transmitter coordinates: 18°19′47″N 99°30′32″W

Links
- Website: www.lagrandedeiguala.com

XHIG-FM is a radio station on 106.5 FM in Iguala, Guerrero, Mexico. It is a known as La Grande de Iguala Full-service format.

== History ==
XEIG-AM 1430 received its concession on August 6, 1960. It was owned by Rafael Cutberto Navarro and affiliated to his Radio Cadena Nacional, broadcasting with 1,000 watts during the day and 100 at night. In 1964, Cutberto Navarro placed the station under the control of Radio Iguala, S.A. The 1990s saw XEIG move to 880 kHz and begin broadcasting with 2.5 kW day and 1 kW night. Today's RCN still owns the station.

XEIG was cleared for AM-FM migration in 2010 as XHIG-FM 106.5.

The station switched on November 13, 2023, from its longtime La Grande de Iguala name to the La Mejor network. On June 17, 2024, La Grande de Iguala returned.
