= XHGV-FM =

Radio station in Querétaro

- Querétaro, Querétaro; Mexico
- Broadcast area: Querétaro, Querétaro
- Frequency: 106.5 FM
- Branding: Mix

Programming
- Format: Adult hits

Ownership
- Owner: Grupo ACIR; (Radio XHGV, S. de R.L. de C.V.)

History
- First air date: July 14, 1977 (concession)

Technical information
- Class: AA
- ERP: 1.5 kW
- HAAT: 79.65 m
- Transmitter coordinates: 20°36′20.8″N 100°22′08.5″W

Links
- Website: 106.5 Mix Website

XHGV-FM is a radio station on 106.5 FM in Querétaro, Querétaro, Mexico. The station is owned by Grupo ACIR and carries an adult hits format known as 106.5 Mix.

== History ==
XHGV began as XEGV-AM 1120, awarded to Juana María Infante Dardon on July 14, 1977. It was initially based in the town of El Pueblito in Villa Corregidora Municipality and broadcast as a 500-watt daytimer.

In 1994, the station was sold to Radio XEGV de Querétaro, S.A. By this time the station had upgraded to 1,000 watts day and 500 watts night. In 2000, the concession was brought under the fold of Radio Integral, the concessionaire for Grupo ACIR.

In October 2011, XEGV received approval to migrate to FM on 106.5 MHz. At some point after, the Mix format moved from XHQTO-FM 97.9 to this station.
