= Oak Lake Beach =

Community in Manitoba, Canada

Coordinates: 49.678°N 100.711°W

Oak Lake Beach is a community in the Canadian province of Manitoba, located on the shore of Oak Lake. It is located within the Rural Municipality of Sifton.

== See also ==
- List of communities in Manitoba
