= Conservation Districts (Manitoba) =

The Manitoba Watershed District Program is a provincial-municipal partnership directed to the conservation and management of water and soil resources. There are 14 watershed districts including more than 130 municipalities covering almost all of the agricultural areas of Manitoba, Canada. The Province provides substantial funding and general guidance but the programs are developed and administered locally. The districts spend more than $8 million each year on a wide variety of conservation programs.

== Whitemud Watershed District ==
The Whitemud Watershed District created in 1972 was the first district formed in Manitoba. The district covers about 2,450 square miles (6,350 km^{2}) in south central Manitoba. It includes all or portions of 15 rural municipalities and three towns. It includes all the area that drains into the Whitemud River. The district's goal is to promote soil and water stewardship and to facilitate agricultural land drainage on a watershed basis. The District is responsible for over 1,100 miles (1,800 km) of drainage infrastructure and 1,200 crossings. Major activities include maintenance and replacement of infrastructure, as well as proactive soil and water conservation projects such as forage assistance, shelterbelts, grassed runways, water retention, shale traps, habitat preservation, conservation corridors, stream bank stabilization and riparian management.

== West Lake Watershed District ==
The West Lake Watershed District was born in 1978 as the Alonsa Conservation District, in 2020 it expanded and the name was changed. It is on the west shore of Lake Manitoba. The beef cattle industry dominates the local economy as well as commercial fishing in the winter months. The District has been involved in soil and water management. Some of the major projects include channel construction, improvements and maintenance, water level and flood control, land drainage, forage seed assistance, waterfowl nesting grounds, waterfowl enhancement and school conservation education programs.

== Northeast Red Watershed District ==
The Northeast Red Watershed District was started in 1979 as the Cooks Creek Conservation District in 2020 the name and boundaries were changed to watershed boundaries. The municipalities include Springfield, Tache, Ste. Anne, Brokenhead and Reynolds. Water management is the most important issue in the District. The District places emphasis on the maintenance and upgrading of agricultural drainage channels. Other initiatives include sealing abandoned wells, crossing replacements and repairs and public education.

== Pembina Watershed District ==
The Pembina Waterhhed District was formed in 1989 as the Pembina Valley Conservation District. The name and boundaries were changed in 2020. The District includes portions of the Turtle Mountain, Pembina Valley, Tiger Hills, Red River Valley and Pembina Escarpment. municipalities included in the District are Killarney Turtle Mountain, Boissevaine-Morton, Lorne, Thompson, Cartwright-Roblin, Louise, Stanley and Pembina. Towns included are Killarney, Pilot Mound and Manitou, in addition to the Village of Crystal City. The District's priorities are conservation farming and water management.

== Souris River Watershed District ==
The Souris River Watershed District was incorporated in 1995 as the West Souris Conservation District. The name and boundaries were changed in 2020 absorbing about half of the Turtle Mountain Conservation District. Is located in southwest corner of Manitoba. The municipalities included are Deloraine-winchester, Brenda-Waskada, Grassland, Boissevain-Morton, Two Borders, Pipestone, Sifton, Cameron and Wallace. Water and soil management programs are priorities of the District. Programs include water storage, sealing abandoned wells, well development, shelterbelt planting, riparian management, forage rotation, zero tillage and habitat conservation initiatives.

The district recognizes the important links between human health and watershed health. Through education, innovative leadership, community input and partnerships the district strives to manage the watershed as a complex sustainable system emphasizing prevention and protection programs. The District places a particular focus on public education.

Major streams found in the district include Gopher, Pipestone, Stoney, Jackson, Graham, Gainsborough, Antler, Medora and the Souris River. Major water bodies include Whitewater, Maple, Oak and Plum Lakes.

== Assiniboine West Watershed District ==
This district, was created in 2020 combining the Lake of the Prairies, Upper Assiniboine and Little Saskatchewan River Conservation Districts

The district can be divided into three distinct landscapes: uplands, plains and river valleys. From the Newdale Plain to the border of Riding Mountain National Park, the undulating topography can vary over 200 meters. The dominant feature is the Assiniboine River meandering through the area. In places the valley is more than 1 mile (2 km) wide and over 75 meters deep with steep slopes. The Assiniboine River Valley is one of the most scenic aspects but also presents a major resource management issue.

== Inter-Mountain Watershed District ==
The Intermountain Conservation District was formed in 1997. In 2020, the Turtle River Watershed Conservation District, formed in 1975, was added and renamed the Inter-Mountain Watershed District. Riding Mountain National Park, Duck Mountain Provincial Forest, Crown Territory and Lakes Dauphin and Winnipegosis surround the District. The municipalities included in this District are Ste. Rose, McCreary, Dauphin, Ethelbert, Gilbert Plains, Grandview, Mossey River and Mountain. The Villages of McCreary, Ste Rose du lac, Winnipegosis and Ethelbert, the towns of Grandview and Gilbert Plains and the City of Dauphin are also included. Water management is the highest priority. Soil conservation and public education are priorities as well. IMWD is the only watershed district in the program with a responsibility to maintain waterway infrastructure (bridges/crossings and drains) in only some municipalities within the District.

== Kelsey Watershed District ==
The Kelsey Conservation District was born in 1999 and the name was changed in 2020. It is located in the west-central Manitoba and includes the Pasquia hills and Carrot River drainage basins. The District is most interested in developing programs that educate the public about prudent resource management, soil and water conservation practices and local decision-making as a means to maintain a healthy rural landscape. Some projects include off-site watering, exclusion fencing, forage assistance, abandoned well capping, well disinfecting, tree planting and wildlife habitat enhancement.

== Central Assiniboine Watershed District ==
The Central Assiniboine District was formed in 2020. It covers 1,759 square miles (4,560 km^{2}). It includes the municipalities of Argyle, Victoria, Glenwood, Cornwallis, Prairie Lakes and South Cypress and the Village of Glenboro and Wawanesa and the town of Souris. The board has stressed soil conservation, water management and conservation education programs.

== Seine Rat Roseau Watershed District ==
The Seine Rat Roseau Watershed District is made up of three main watersheds; the Roseau River, the Seine River and the Rat River Watersheds. The five sub-watersheds that all drain into the Seine River Watershed are the Upper Seine River, the Lower Seine River, the Seine River Diversion, the Tourond Creek and the Manning Canal. The two sub-watersheds that contribute to the Rat River Watershed are the Upper Rat River and the Lower Rat River/Joubert Creek watersheds.

The district includes the municipalities of La Broquerie, Ste. Anne, Hanover, De Salaberry, Ritchot, Stuartburn, Reynolds, Montcalm, City of Steinbach, Town of Ste. Anne, the Village of t. Pierre-Jolys, Emerson-Franklin, the Town of Niverville, Piney, Springfield and Tache. The only outstanding municipalities are the City of Winnipeg and Morris, who have yet to join and complete the entire watershed as a unified voice of water management together over southeastern Manitoba. The district operates under the board of directors, made up of municipal appointed rate-payers and councilors who are all working together for the overall health of the watershed. Decision-making processes are based on watershed boundaries and local grassroots knowledge, with the leader of each sub-watershed taking a position on the main district board. All recommendations are made by the local sub-watershed committees and are brought before the main board for approval.

The Seine Rat Roseau Watershed District covers an area southeast of Winnipeg, over 7,000km2 and is home to approximately 68,000 people. The district offers a full line of water management programs with a particular focus on surface and groundwater management initiatives. One of the main objectives lies in creating water retention projects to hold back water during spring run-off to alleviate flooding downstream and provide greater aquifer recharge areas, as groundwater is a major drinking water supply to residents. Both objectives increase water quality on the surface and sub-surface overall. The district also provides funding to seal old and abandoned wells that present a point of contamination to groundwater; for livestock producers to purchase alternative watering systems & riparian fencing to keep livestock out of dugout, creeks and rivers; and to monitor well water in rural homes throughout the district are among the most popular programs. More information can be found at www.srrcd.ca

== Redboine Watershed District ==
The Redboine Watershed District was established in 2020, formerly the LaSalle Redboine Conservation Districy. It includes all or parts of the municipalities of Dufferin, Grey, South Norfolk, Cartier and Victoria. It also includes Carman, St. Claude and Treherne. Their programs include grassed waterways, off channel watering systems, cover programs, rotational grazing systems and pasture pipelines.

== East Interlake Watershed District ==
The East Interlake Watershed District was renamed in 2020, originally incorporated as East Interlake Conservation District in 2005. The district covers about 3,900 square miles (10,000 km^{2}) and is home to 55,000 residents. The District includes all or parts of the municipalities of Armstrong, Bifrost, Fisher, Gimli, St. Andrews, West St. Paul, Rockwood, Rosser, City of Selkirk, Towns of Arborg, Stonewall, Teulon and Winnipeg Beach, Villages of Riverton and Dunnottar. The district offers a wide range of programs, such as riparian management, well inventory, sealing abandoned wells, benthic invertebrate monitoring, culvert assessment and inventory, and water quality monitoring.

== West Interlake Watershed District ==
The West Interlake Watershed District started in 2008 as a conservation district changed name to watershed district in 2020. The District covers 1,761 square miles (4,560 km^{2}) and is home to more than 6,500 people. The District is located along the eastern shores of Lake Manitoba. Municipalities include Armstrong, Coldwell, Eriksdale, Siglunes, St. Laurent, and Woodlands. The district develops and deliver programs to address priority land and water management issues and public education.

== Swan Lake Watershed District ==
The Swan Lake Watershed District is the dedicated to regional land and water issues in a co-operative, long-term planning. It was formed in 2006, is about 1,630 square miles (4,220 km^{2}). The District is located in western Manitoba between the Duck Mountain Provincial Park and forest and Porcupine Provincial Forest. Municipal partners include the rural municipalities of Minitonas, Mountain and Swan River, the towns of Birch River, Minitonas and Swan River and the villages of Benito and Bowsman.
