= Plum Creek (Manitoba) =

River in Manitoba

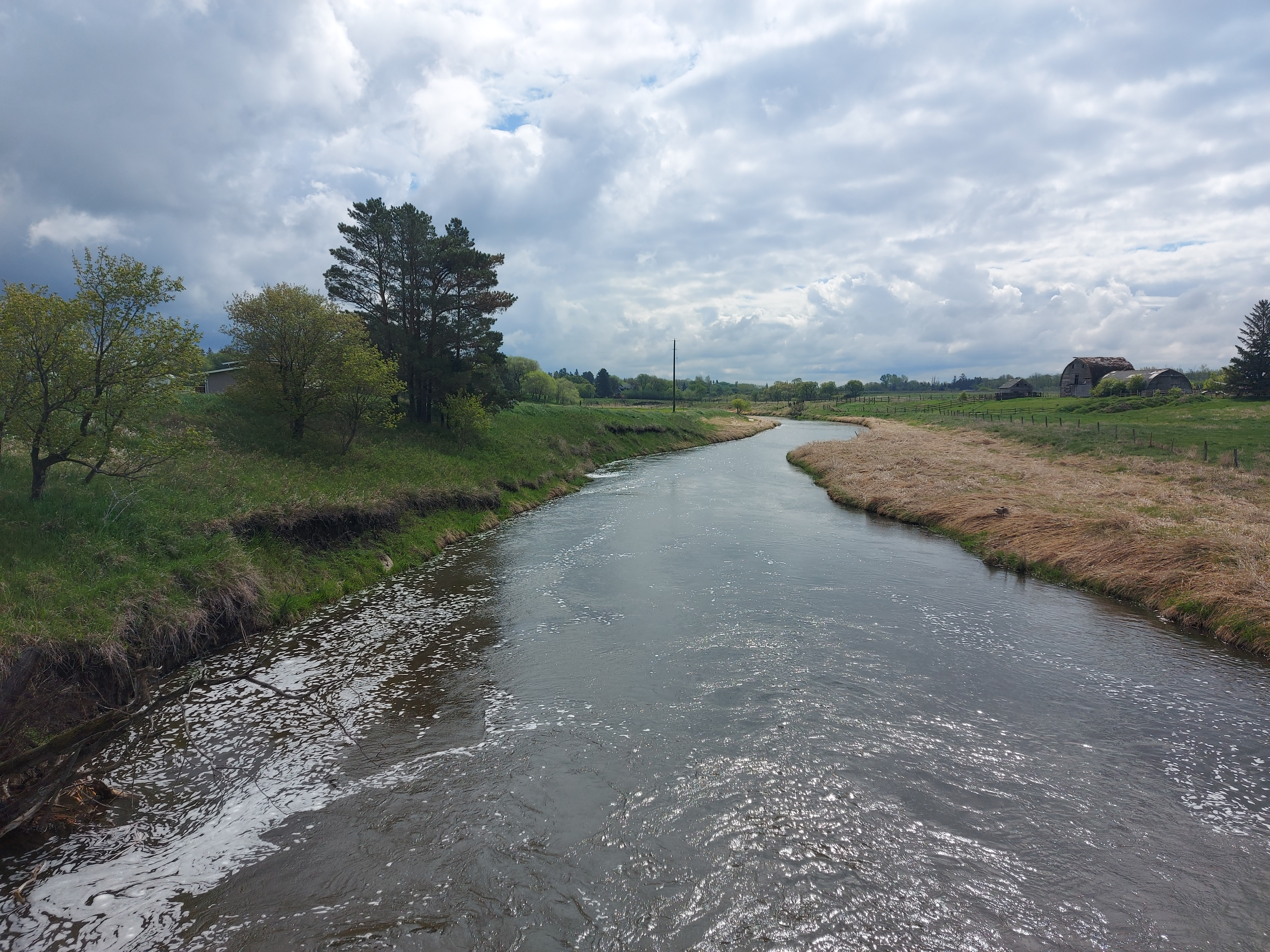
- Plum Creek

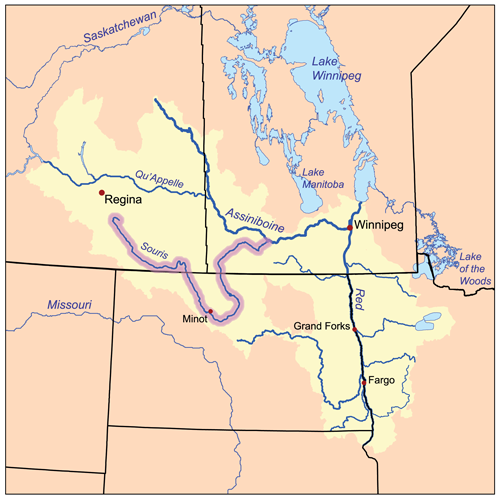
- The Red River drainage basin, with the Souris River highlighted

- Location of mouth in Manitoba Plum Creek (Manitoba) (Canada)

Location
- Countries: Canada
- Provinces: Manitoba
- Towns: Souris

Physical characteristics
- Source: Plum Lakes
  - location: Manitoba
- Mouth: Souris River, at the community of Souris
  - location: Manitoba
  - coordinates: 49°36′51″N 100°15′20″W
- Discharge
  - location: Souris River

Basin features
- River system: Red River drainage basin

Plum Creek is the primary outflow for the Plum Lakes (49°37′51″N, 100°43′39″W) and travels in an easterly direction for about 28 kilometres until it meets up with the Souris River, which is part of the Hudson Bay drainage basin, at the community of Souris in the Canadian province of Manitoba. Plum Lakes and the beginning of Plum Creek are in the Rural Municipality of Sifton and the mouth is in the Municipality of Souris – Glenwood.

== Description ==
The course of Plum Creek flows north-east past the Souris Sand Hills then back east-southeast towards the Souris River in a gentle arc. While Plum Creek itself is relatively short with no notable tributaries along its course, it has a large drainage basin that goes as far west and north as Grenfell, Saskatchewan.

The source for Plum Creek is Plum Lakes. The inflows for the Plum Lakes, which are a group of lakes to the south and east of Oak Lake, include Maple Lake (fed by Stony Creek), Bell Creek, and Oak Lake. Oak Lake, through Oak Lake Dam (49°38′27″N, 100°45′8″W), is the primary inflow for the Plum Lakes. Along the western side of Oak Lake is Oak Lake Marsh, which is where Oak Lake's primary inflow, Pipestone Creek, enters the lake. With a basin size of 2,242 km^{2} (866 sq mi), Pipestone Creek and its tributaries make up the bulk of the land area in Plum Creek's overall watershed. Pipestone Creek drains much of the northern and eastern portions of Moose Mountain Upland in Saskatchewan and as far north and west as Grenfell, Saskatchewan.

Maple Lake, Plum Lakes, Lauder Sand Hills, Oak Lake, Oak Lake Marsh (which is almost 4 times the size of Oak Lake itself), and Plum Creek are all part of Important Bird Area (IBA) Canada called Oak Lake / Plum Lakes Area. This IBA is a very important breeding ground and stop-over for migrating birds and it covers 654.07 km^{2} (252.54 sq mi) of habitat.

== Concrete Bowstring Arch Bridge No. 734 ==
The Concrete Bowstring Arch Bridge No. 734 is an abandoned concrete arch bridge over Plum Creek, west of Souris in the Municipality of Souris-Glenwood. It was built in 1921 as part of Provincial Trunk Highway #2 and is now part of the Canadian Register of Historic Places and on the list of historic places in Manitoba. Highway 2 has since been relocated farther south.

== See also ==
- List of rivers of Manitoba
- List of protected areas of Manitoba
- Oak Lake Aquifer
