= XHLK-FM =

Radio station in Zacatecas, Mexico

- Zacatecas, Zacatecas; Mexico
- Frequency: 106.5 FM
- Branding: Digital 106.5

Programming
- Format: Pop

Ownership
- Owner: Grupo Radiofónico ZER; (Radio Publicidad Zacatecana, S.A. de C.V.)

History
- First air date: December 3, 1939 (concession)

Technical information
- Licensing authority: CRT
- Class: B
- ERP: 10 kW
- HAAT: 403 m (1,322 ft)
- Transmitter coordinates: 22°43′59″N 102°33′00″W

Links
- Webcast: XHLK-FM

XHLK-FM is a radio station on 106.5 FM in Zacatecas, Zacatecas, Mexico. It is owned by Grupo Radiofónico Zer and known as Digital 106.5 with a pop format.

== History ==
XELK-AM 1080 received its concession on December 3, 1939. The 100-watt station was owned by Jesús Macías Guerrero and José Miguel Acevedo. In 1961, XELK was sold to Victoria Graciela Alba de Llamas. XELK remained on 1280 kHz into the 1960s, with 500 watts, but by the 1980s it was on 830 kHz.

Radio Publicidad Zacatecana bought the station in 2000. By the 2000s, daytime power was 10,000 watts.

XELK migrated to FM in November 2010. It is the last station to carry the Digital format from ACIR; since 2013, ACIR's own pop stations have used the Radio Disney format. Grupo ZER's contract with ACIR expired in early 2017.

In 2018, the IFT approved a power increase and class upgrade for XHLK-FM.
