= KHUK =

- Granite Shoals, Texas; United States
- Broadcast area: Texas Hill Country
- Frequency: 106.5 MHz

Programming
- Format: Smooth Jazz
- Affiliations: Air-Com Radio Network

Ownership
- Owner: Robert Little and Mark St Clair; (River Radio LLC)

History
- First air date: September 29, 2000
- Former call signs: KBAE (2000–2004); KQBT (2004–2005); KAJZ (2005–2024)
- Former frequencies: 96.3 MHz (2000–2014)

Technical information
- Licensing authority: FCC
- Facility ID: 87996
- Class: C3
- ERP: 7,000 watts
- HAAT: 174.7 meters (573 ft)
- Transmitter coordinates: 30°41′12″N 98°34′16″W
- Translators: K271BC (102.1 MHz, Burnet)

Links
- Public license information: Public file; LMS
- Website: KAJZradio.com

KHUK (106.5 MHz) is a commercial FM radio station licensed to Granite Shoals, Texas, United States. The station is owned by Robert Little and Mark St Clair, through licensee River Radio LLC. KHUK airs a smooth jazz radio format. The station is largely automated, mixing instrumental contemporary jazz songs along with some jazz, pop and R&B vocals.

== History ==
The station first signed on as KBAE on September 29, 2000. It originally broadcast at 96.5 MHz, with 2,900 watts of power.

On August 2, 2004, the station changed its call sign to KQBT, trying a rhythmic contemporary format known as "The Beat." On October 19, 2005, it switched to smooth jazz and the call sign KAJZ.

The station changed its call sign to KHUK on March 30, 2024.
