= KEAL =

- Taft, California; United States
- Broadcast area: Bakersfield metropolitan area
- Frequency: 106.5 MHz
- Branding: Radio Lazer 106.5

Programming
- Format: Regional Mexican

Ownership
- Owner: Lazer Licenses, LLC

History
- First air date: 2009

Technical information
- Licensing authority: FCC
- Facility ID: 164120
- Class: A
- ERP: 6,000 watts
- HAAT: 87 meters (285 ft)
- Transmitter coordinates: 35°5′39″N 119°27′40″W

Links
- Public license information: Public file; LMS

KEAL (106.5 FM) is a radio station broadcasting a Regional Mexican format licensed to Taft, California, United States. The station is currently owned by Lazer Licenses, LLC.
