= Ultra106five =

Australian radio station

ultra106five (7HFC)
- Hobart, Tasmania; Australia
- Broadcast area: Hobart
- Frequency: 106.5 MHz

Programming
- Format: Contemporary Christian, adult contemporary

Ownership
- Owner: Hope Foundation Communicators Inc

History
- First air date: 30 March 1980

Technical information
- Licensing authority: ACMA
- ERP: 18,000 watts
- HAAT: 406 m

Links
- Public licence information: Profile
- Website: ultra106five.com

Ultra106five is a Christian radio station in Hobart, Tasmania. Ultra106five is Hobart's only Christian radio station, and was one of the first of its kind in Australia. The station provides a mixed format of Christian, Easy Listening and Hot Adult Contemporary music.

== About ==
Ultra106.5fm is Hobart's only Christian radio station. The station has been on the air since 1980, and was one of the first Christian radio stations to operate in Australia.

The format of ultra106five is described as "Contemporary Christian Radio", which is Christian-infused mainstream light contemporary radio. The program format is designed to reach out to the wider community as well as the Christian community. This is achieved with "family friendly" and accessible music with a positive or relational message, whether performed by Christian or non-Christian artists and regardless of whether or not the music is intentionally carrying a Christian message.

== History ==
Ultra106five began in the 1970s with a group of people who had a vision of a Christian radio station in Hobart. Neville and Joan Brown and a friend of theirs had the initial idea for a Christian radio station in Hobart immediately after a time of prayer.

It was 1974, and Neville had just left his job as a supervising engineer at the ABC.

After making some initial enquiries, they discovered that no radio licences were being offered at that stage, so they left for an overseas trip thinking they had missed it. When Neville and Joan went overseas, everywhere they went, they came across Christian radio, and so the idea of a Christian radio station in Hobart just wouldn't go away!

Finally, in 1978, the opportunity to apply for a public broadcasting licence came. The Browns were due to go overseas in just a few days when they heard about the opportunity. They quickly gathered together their meagre resources to apply for the licence. There were Christian licences being offered in every state and each group had to go before a tribunal to present their case.

In the end, only two licences were offered. One in Sydney to what is now known as Hope 103.2, and 7HFC in Hobart! Once the licence was acquired, it was still a little bit longer before the 7HFC team could get the radio station on the air.

Initially, a studio was set up in the corner of Neville and Joan's New Town home so that they could get the station off the ground.

Then, at 2 PM on Sunday 30 March 1980, 7HFC (Hope Foundation Communicators) went to air in Hobart for the very first time!

In the 1990s, Neville developed Parkinson's Disease, and so he began to focus on training. In 1996, he handed the station over to others. Neville died in 2004. Joan died in 2012.
