= Rural Municipality of Sifton =

Rural municipality in Manitoba, Canada

Sifton
- Rural municipality
- Rural Municipality of Sifton
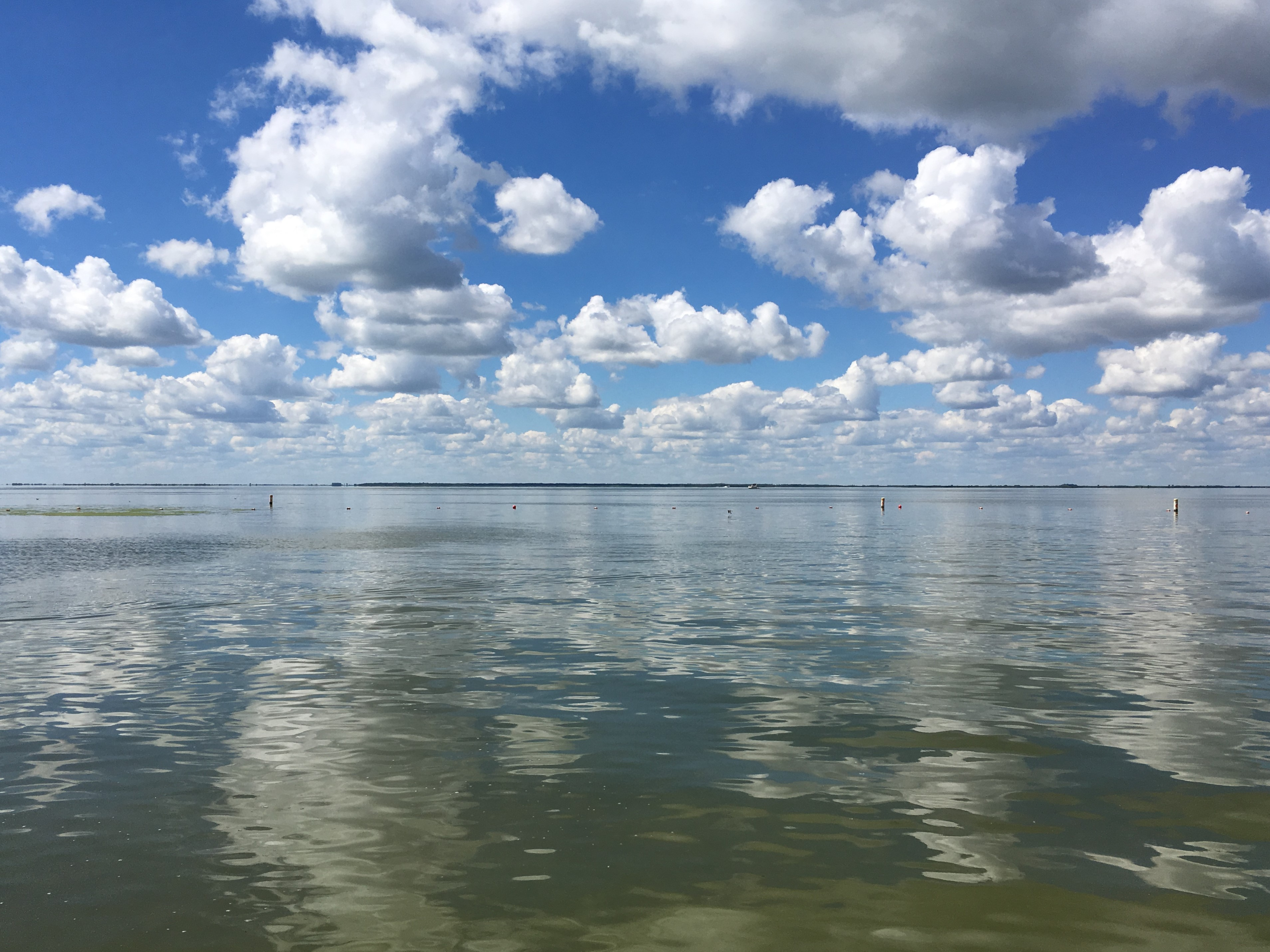
- Oak Lake

- Location of the RM of Sifton in Manitoba
- Coordinates: 49°39′55″N 100°40′04″W
- Country: Canada
- Province: Manitoba
- Region: Westman
- Incorporated: December 22, 1883
- (Amalgamation): January 1, 2015

Area
  - Total: 768 km^{2} (297 sq mi)

Population (2021)
  - Total: 1,239
  - Density: 1.61/km^{2} (4.18/sq mi)
- Time zone: UTC-6 (CST)
  - Summer (DST): UTC-5 (CDT)
- Area code: +1-204
- Website: www.rmofsifton.com

The Rural Municipality of Sifton is a rural municipality (RM) in the south-west portion of the Canadian province of Manitoba.

== History ==
The RM was incorporated in 1883. The former town of Oak Lake, located within Sifton, annexed by the RM on January 1, 2015, as a requirement of The Municipal Amalgamations Act, which required municipalities with a population less than 1,000 to amalgamate with neighbouring municipalities. The Government of Manitoba initiated these amalgamations in order for municipalities to meet the 1997 minimum population requirement of 1,000 to incorporate a municipality.

== Geography ==
The most prominent geographical feature in the RM is Oak Lake. Other lakes include the Plum Lakes and Maple Lake. The Assiniboine River runs near the northern border of the RM and at the extreme south-east corner of the RM is the Souris River. Other notable rivers include Pipestone Creek and Plum Creek.

=== Communities ===
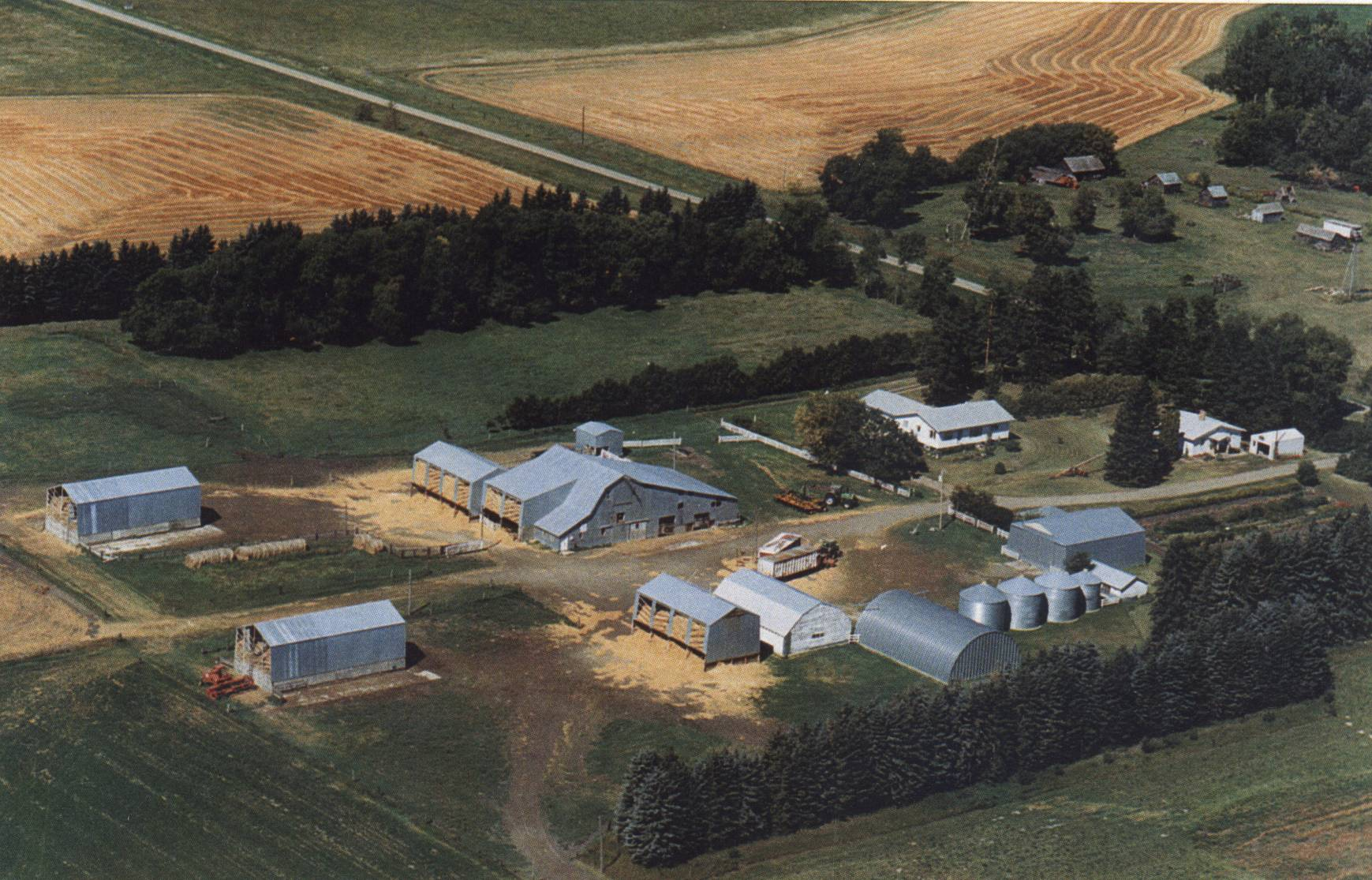
A farm in Sifton near Deleau

- Algar
- Belleview
- Deleau
- Findlay
- Griswold
- Oak Lake
- Oak Lake Beach
- Ralston
- Routledge

== Demographics ==
In the 2021 Census of Population conducted by Statistics Canada, Sifton had a population of 1,239 living in 502 of its 771 total private dwellings, a change of −1.4% from its 2016 population of 1,256. With a land area of 839.5 km^{2} (324.1 sq mi), it had a population density of 1.5/km^{2} (3.8/sq mi) in 2021.

== Conservation ==
In 2016, the Nature Conservancy of Canada bought 127 acres of land on the Oak Lake Sand Hills, east of Oak Lake. The property is a mixture of wetlands and rolling sandy hills and contains eleven uncommon and at-risk species.

== Transportation ==
The following is a list of highways in the RM:

- Manitoba Highway 1
- Manitoba Highway 2, also known as the Red Coat Trail
- Manitoba Highway 21
- Manitoba Provincial Road 254
- Manitoba Provincial Road 255
- Manitoba Provincial Road 543
