= KALT-FM =

- Alturas, California; United States
- Frequency: 106.5 MHz

Programming
- Format: Classic rock

Ownership
- Owner: Woodrow Michael Warren

History
- First air date: 1990

Technical information
- Licensing authority: FCC
- Facility ID: 82294
- Class: A
- ERP: 500 watts
- HAAT: 83 meters (272 ft)
- Transmitter coordinates: 41°29′57″N 120°37′30″W

Links
- Public license information: Public file; LMS

KALT-FM (106.5 FM) is a radio station broadcasting a classic rock format licensed to Alturas, California, United States. The station is currently owned by Woodrow Michael Warren.
