= WAGE-LP =

- Oak Hill, West Virginia; United States
- Broadcast area: Metro Oak Hill
- Frequency: 106.5 MHz
- Branding: WAGE 106.5

Programming
- Format: Variety

Ownership
- Owner: Southern Appalachian Labor School

History
- First air date: May 2016
- Call sign meaning: Hourly wage

Technical information
- Licensing authority: FCC
- Facility ID: 194270
- Class: L1
- ERP: 21 watts
- HAAT: 65.8 meters (216 ft)
- Transmitter coordinates: 37°58′28.58″N 81°8′59.17″W

Links
- Public license information: LMS

WAGE-LP is a variety formatted broadcast radio station licensed to and serving Oak Hill, West Virginia. WAGE-LP is owned and operated by Southern Appalachian Labor School.
