= WJVA-LP =

- Portsmouth, Virginia; United States
- Frequency: 106.5 MHz
- Branding: WJVA radio

Programming
- Format: Variety

Ownership
- Owner: Juneteenth Festival Company

Technical information
- Licensing authority: FCC
- Facility ID: 197612
- Class: LP1
- ERP: 86 watts
- HAAT: 32 metres (105 ft)
- Transmitter coordinates: 36°49′10.9″N 76°27′34.5″W

Links
- Public license information: LMS
- Website: wjvaradio.org/home/

WJVA-LP (106.5 FM, "WJVA radio") is a radio station licensed to serve the community of Portsmouth, Virginia. The station is owned by Juneteenth Festival Company and airs a variety format.

The station was assigned the WJVA-LP call letters by the Federal Communications Commission on October 31, 2014.
