= CIFN-FM =

Defunct
- Island Lake, Saskatchewan; Canada
- Frequency: 106.5 MHz

Programming
- Format: First Nations community radio

Ownership
- Owner: Island Lake First Nations Radio Inc.

History
- First air date: 2011

Technical information
- Transmitter coordinates: 54.0494°N 109.669°W

CIFN-FM was a radio station which broadcast a First Nations community radio programming on the frequency of 106.5 FM in Island Lake, Saskatchewan, Canada.

Owned by Island Lake First Nations Radio Inc., the station received CRTC approval on January 10, 2011. Its licence was renewed in 2017 but only on condition of presenting several years of annual returns and implementing Alert Ready, and the station was thereafter deleted from databases.

On July 28, 2023, the CRTC renewed the broadcasting licences for the radio programming undertakings and their transmitters set out in Appendix 1 to this decision from 1 September 2024 to 31 August 2026. CIFN-FM Island Lake was included in the renewals.
