= WAVH =

- Daphne, Alabama; United States
- Broadcast area: Mobile metropolitan area
- Frequency: 106.5 MHz
- Branding: FM Talk 106-5

Programming
- Format: Talk
- Network: Townhall News
- Affiliations: Compass Media Networks; Premiere Networks; Radio America

Ownership
- Owner: Bigler Broadcasting LLC

History
- First air date: 1993; 33 years ago
- Former call signs: WUIF (1990–1990); WFMI (1990–1994)

Technical information
- Licensing authority: FCC
- Facility ID: 3636
- Class: C2
- ERP: 50,000 watts
- HAAT: 142 meters (466 feet)
- Transmitter coordinates: 30°44′44″N 88°05′40″W

Links
- Public license information: Public file; LMS
- Webcast: Listen Live
- Website: FMtalk1065.com

WAVH (106.5 FM, "FM Talk 106-5") is a commercial radio station licensed to Daphne, Alabama, and serving the Mobile metropolitan area. The station airs a talk radio format and is owned by Bigler Broadcasting, LLC. The studios and offices are located at 900 Western America Circle Suite #106 Interstate 65/Airport Boulevard interchange in Mobile.

WAVH has an effective radiated power (ERP) of 50,000 watts. The transmitter is on Shelton Beach Road Extension at Pallister Place West in the Beau Terra neighborhood of Mobile.

== Programming ==
FM Talk 1065 airs local talk shows during the day on weekdays, averaging 40 hours a week of live shows produced by WAVH. Weekdays begin with Mobile Mornings hosted by Dan Brennan and Dalton Orwig. Jeff Poor is heard in late mornings. Midday Mobile with Sean Sullivan airs in early afternoons. The rest of the weekday schedule is syndicated programs: The Paul Finebaum Show focusing on SEC sports, The Michael Berry Show, The Joe Pags Show, The Dana Loesch Show and This Morning, America's First News with Gordon Deal.

Weekends on FM Talk 1065 feature specialty shows including local home improvement expert Danny Lipford, local high school sports talk with the Prep Sports Report, local hunting and fishing talk with FM Talk 1065 Outdoors, South Alabama food and drink talk with Sip and Chew, Plain Gardening on the Gulf Coast with Bill Finch and local golf talk with Randy Burgan and Tee Time. Syndicated weekend programs include The Kim Komando Show and Free Talk Live. Most hours begin with an update from Townhall News.

== History ==
=== Early years ===
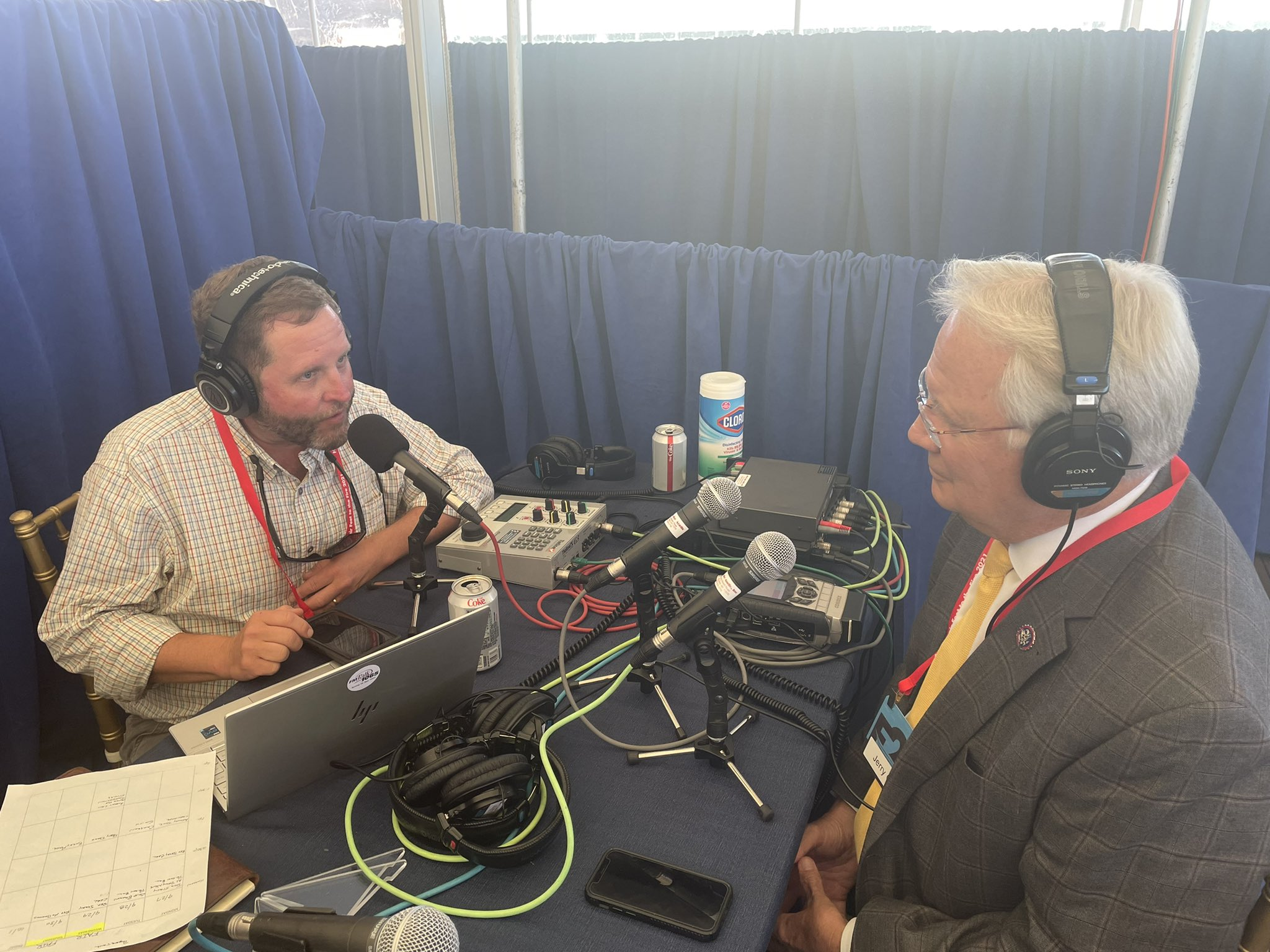
Jerry Carl live on WAVH during a remote broadcast in Washington D.C. in 2021.

This station received its original construction permit from the Federal Communications Commission (FCC) on March 5, 1990. Its original city of license was Bay Minette, Alabama. The new station was assigned the call letters WUIF by the FCC on May 3, 1990. Just over a month later, on June 4, 1990, the station was assigned new call letters WFMI. The new station began broadcasting a soft adult contemporary music format in mid-1993 under program test authority. The station had the moniker "LiteMix 106.5".

After several extensions, renewals, and changes, WFMI received its license to cover from the FCC on August 25, 1993. The station was assigned the current WAVH call letters on October 14, 1994. The FCC authorized WAVH to change its community of license to Daphne, Alabama, on November 29, 1996.

In June 1997, the Baldwin Broadcasting Company reached an agreement to sell this station to American General Media through its AGM-Nevada, LLC, subsidiary. The deal was approved by the FCC on August 5, 1997, but the transaction was never consummated and control of the station remained with Baldwin Broadcasting.

=== Financial problems ===
In November 2000, the Baldwin Broadcasting Company faced financial difficulties and an application was made to transfer control of WAVH to Baldwin Broadcasting Company, Debtor-In-Possession. The transfer was approved by the FCC on December 8, 2000, and the transaction was consummated on December 12, 2000.

In May 2002, Baldwin Broadcasting Company, Debtor-In-Possession, reached an agreement to sell this station to Cumulus Media through the Cumulus Licensing Corporation subsidiary for a reported $5.11 million. The deal was never gained FCC approval and the application was dismissed at the request of both parties to the transaction on November 15, 2004. At the time of the announcement, WAVH broadcast an oldies music format.

In March 2007, Baldwin Broadcasting Company, Debtor-In-Possession, reached an agreement to transfer the broadcast license for the station to Barry Wood, doing business as the Baldwin Broadcasting Company. The deal was approved by the FCC on May 15, 2007, and the transaction was consummated on May 23, 2007. Just a few months later, in October 2007, Barry Wood reached an agreement to sell this station to Donald Bigler's Bigler Broadcasting, LLC, for a reported $3.6 million. The deal was approved by the FCC on November 27, 2007, and the transaction was consummated on January 31, 2008.

The station used the moniker "Oldies 106" until August 2006. At that time, it began stunting by continuously playing songs by Jimmy Buffett. After the stunt, WAVH switched to adult hits format. Until April 2009, WAVH was branded as "106.5 The Pirate" with the slogan "70s, 80s, and Whatever We Want!"

=== Flip to talk ===
At the end of April 2009, "The Pirate" came to an end. A talk radio format, branded as "FM Talk 106-5", launched on May 1, 2009. Most of Mobile's other talk stations are on the AM radio dial.

WAVH broadcasts a mix of local talk and nationally syndicated talk programs. National hosts include Dana Loesch, Michael Berry and Joe Pags. In afternoon drive time, WAVH carries Paul Finebaum, discussing SEC sports. The talk format began with CBS Radio News updates each hour but the station later switched to Townhall News.
