= WXMP-LP =

- Cordova, Tennessee; United States
- Frequency: 106.5 MHz

Programming
- Format: Religious

Ownership
- Owner: Millington Community Center, Inc.

History
- Former call signs: WCVD-LP (2006–2019)
- Former frequencies: 106.7 MHz (2006–2016)

Technical information
- Licensing authority: FCC
- Facility ID: 133598
- Class: L1
- ERP: 36 watts
- HAAT: 47 meters (154 ft)
- Transmitter coordinates: 35°23′53.60″N 89°53′21.20″W

Links
- Public license information: LMS

WXMP-LP (106.5 FM) is a radio station licensed to Cordova, Tennessee, United States. The station has been owned since 2020 by Millington Community Center, Inc.
