= CJJJ-FM =

Campus radio station in Manitoba, Canada

Coordinates: 49°50′28″N 99°55′13″W

- Brandon, Manitoba; Canada
- Broadcast area: Westman Region
- Frequency: 106.5 MHz
- Branding: CJ 106.5

Programming
- Format: Campus/Community

Ownership
- Owner: Assiniboine Campus-Community Radio Society

History
- First air date: September 2003

Technical information
- Class: A
- ERP: 930 watts
- HAAT: 19.4 metres (63.6 feet)

Links
- Webcast: Listen Live
- Website: assiniboine.net/community/cj-106-fm/about-cj-106-fm

CJJJ-FM is the call sign of a campus radio station operating in Brandon, Manitoba, Canada. CJJJ operates at 106.5 MHz with an effective radiated power of 930 watts. Although predominantly alternative, CJJJ also features jazz, folk, classical, worldbeat, heavy metal, punk, Christian music and more.

== History ==
CJJJ officially launched in September 2003. Since then it has become the community voice of Assiniboine Community College. Students and community volunteers are the main voices of this radio station.

In addition to the music, CJJJ also offers a variety of sports call-in shows, documentaries, and local multicultural shows.
