= KITC-LP =

- Gilchrist, Oregon; United States
- Frequency: 106.5 MHz
- Branding: Community Supported Radio

Programming
- Format: Wheel-O-Format

Ownership
- Owner: Crescent/Gilchrist Community Action Team

Technical information
- Licensing authority: FCC
- Facility ID: 134468
- Class: L1
- ERP: 6 watts
- HAAT: 121.5 meters (399 ft)
- Transmitter coordinates: 43°27′48″N 121°40′5″W

Links
- Public license information: LMS
- Webcast: Listen live
- Website: kitcfm.com

KITC-LP (106.5 FM, "Community Supported Radio") is a low-power radio station. Licensed to Gilchrist, Oregon, United States, the station is currently owned by Crescent/Gilchrist Community Action Team.

KITC operates a rotating wheel of formats depending on the day: traditional oldies on Sunday, contemporary country music on Monday, soft rock on Tuesday, 1970s classic hits on Wednesday, classic rock on Thursday, alt-country/Americana on Friday and 1980s classic hits on Saturday.

The station is an affiliate of the syndicated Pink Floyd program "Floydian Slip."
