= Manitoba Provincial Road 322 =

Provincial Road in Manitoba, Canada

Provincial Road 322
- PR 322 highlighted in red

Route information
- Maintained by Department of Infrastructure
- Length: 41.6 km (25.8 mi)
- Existed: 1966–present

Major junctions
- South end: PTH 6 in Grosse Isle
- PR 321 in Grosse Isle PTH 67 near Warren PR 323 in Argyle
- North end: PR 415 near Erinview

Location
- Country: Canada
- Province: Manitoba
- Rural municipalities: Rosser, Rockwood, Woodlands

Highway system
- Provincial highways in Manitoba; Winnipeg City Routes
← PR 321	→ PR 323

Provincial Road 322 (PR 322) is a 41.6-kilometre-long (25.8 mi) north–south highway in both the Interlake and Winnipeg Metro regions of Manitoba, Canada. It connects the communities of Grosse Isle, Argyle, Woodroyd, and Erinview.

== Route description ==
PR 322 begins in the Rural Municipality of Rosser in the town of Grosse Isle at an intersection with PTH 6 (Northern Woods and Water Route. It heads north through town along Road 1E, crossing both the Prairie Dog Central Railway and PR 321, where it enters the Rural Municipality of Rockwood, before leaving Grosse Isle and continuing north through rural farmland for the several kilometres. After passing by the Manitoba Hydro training facility, the highway has a junction with PTH 67 before continuing on through more rural areas to enter Argyle and join a concurrency (overlap) with PR 323. The pair head due west through the centre of town before becoming unpaved as the road leaves Argyle and enters the Woodlands. PR 322 splits off and heads north shortly thereafter, trading farmland for forests to pass through Woodroyd, where it has an intersection with Road 85N (former PR 517), traverse some switchbacks to travel along eastern coastline of the Shoal Lakes, where it comes to an end just west of Erinview at an intersection with PR 415.

== Major intersections ==
Division	Location	km	mi	Destinations	Notes
Rosser	Grosse Isle	0.0	0.0	PTH 6 (NWWR) – Winnipeg, Ashern	Southern terminus; road continues south as Road 1E
Rosser	Grosse Isle	0.4	0.25	Prairie Dog Trail	Former PTH 6
Rosser / Rockwood boundary	Grosse Isle	0.8	0.50	PR 321 (Road 72N) – Stony Mountain	
Rockwood		7.4	4.6	PTH 67 – Warren, Stonewall	
Rockwood	Argyle	14.0	8.7	PR 323 east – Balmoral	Southern end of PR 323 concurrency
Rockwood	Argyle	15.5	9.6	Pavement ends	
Woodlands		17.2	10.7	PR 323 west – Woodlands	Northern end of PR 323 concurrency
Woodlands	Woodroyd	25.4	15.8	Road 85N – Balmoral	Former PR 517 east
Woodlands		41.6	25.8	PR 415 – Inwood, Teulon	Northern terminus
1.000 mi = 1.609 km; 1.000 km = 0.621 mi: Concurrency terminus
