= Manitoba Provincial Road 236 =

Provincial road in Manitoba, Canada

Provincial Road 236
- PR 236 highlighted in red

Route information
- Maintained by Department of Infrastructure
- Length: 34.5 km (21.4 mi)
- Existed: 1966–present

Major junctions
- South end: PTH 6 near Gordon
- PTH 67 in Stonewall
- North end: PTH 7 near Balmoral

Location
- Country: Canada
- Province: Manitoba
- Rural municipalities: Rosser, Rockwood
- Towns: Stonewall

Highway system
- Provincial highways in Manitoba; Winnipeg City Routes
← PR 234	→ PR 237

Provincial Road 236 (PR 236) is a 34.5-kilometre-long (21.4 mi) north–south highway in the Winnipeg Metropolitan Region of Manitoba. It connects the town of Stonewall with Winnipeg, Gordon, and Balmoral.

== Route description ==
PR 236 begins just 2 kilometres (1.2 mi) east of Gordon at a Roundabout with PTH 6 (Northern Woods and Water Route) in the Rural Municipality of Rosser, not even 1 kilometre (0.62 mi) away from the North Perimeter Highway (PTH 101). The highway heads north through rural farmland for several kilometres, traversing a bridge over a creek before crossing into the Rural Municipality of Rockwood at an intersection with PR 321. Passing through rural areas for a few more kilometres, it enters the town of Stonewall at an intersection with PR 67, becoming concurrent (overlapped) with PR 236 and the two head north along Fourth Street E through neighbourhoods and a business district as they bypass downtown along its eastern side. PTH 67 splits off shortly and PR 236 continues north, leaving Stonewall to have a junction with PR 323. The highway now travels through the centre of Balmoral, where it makes a sharp right turn, before coming to an end at an intersection with PTH 7. The entire length of Provincial Road 236 is a paved two-lane highway.

== Major intersections ==
Division	Location	km	mi	Destinations	Notes
Rosser		0.0	0.0	PTH 6 (NWWR) – Winnipeg, Ashern	Southern terminus; Roundabout
Rosser–Rockwood boundary		8.2	5.1	PR 321 (Road 72N) – Grosse Isle, Stony Mountain	
Rockwood	No major junctions				
Town of Stonewall		14.8	9.2	PTH 67 west – Warren	Southern end of PTH 67 concurrency
Town of Stonewall		16.4	10.2	PTH 67 east (Second Avenue N) – Selkirk	Northern end of PTH 67 concurrency
Rockwood		21.4	13.3	PR 323 – Argyle	
Rockwood	Balmoral	29.6	18.4	Road 85N – Woodroyd	Former PR 517 west
Rockwood		34.5	21.4	PTH 7 – Teulon, Stony Mountain	Northern terminus; road continues as Road 85N
1.000 mi = 1.609 km; 1.000 km = 0.621 mi: Concurrency terminus
