= Manitoba Provincial Road 321 =

Provincial Road in Manitoba, Canada

Provincial Road 321
- PR 321 highlighted in red

Route information
- Maintained by Department of Infrastructure
- Length: 31.9 km (19.8 mi)
- Existed: 1966–present

Major junctions
- West end: PTH 6 in Grosse Isle
- PR 236 near Stonewall; PTH 7 in Stony Mountain
- East end: PTH 8 near Parkdale

Location
- Country: Canada
- Province: Manitoba
- Rural municipalities: Rosser, Rockwood, West St. Paul

Highway system
- Provincial highways in Manitoba; Winnipeg City Routes
← PR 320	→ PR 322

Provincial Road 321 (PR 321) is a 31.9-kilometre-long (19.8 mi) east–west highway in the Winnipeg Capital Region of Manitoba, Canada. It connects the towns of Grosse Isle and Stony Mountain with Parkdale on the north side of Winnipeg.

== Route description ==
PR 321 begins in Grosse Isle at an intersection with PTH 6 (Northern Woods and Water Route) along the border between the Rural Municipality of Rosser and the Rural Municipality of Rockwood. It heads east through the centre of town, crossing the Prairie Dog Central Railway before having a junction with PR 322 (Road 1E), where the pavement turns to gravel. Leaving Grosse Isle behind, it continues east through rural farmland for several kilometres along Road 72N, crossing a small creek and PR 236. The highway makes a sharp left onto Summit Road for a short distance before making a sharp right onto Road 73N, fully entering the Rural Municipality of Rockwood. The highway joins a concurrency with PTH 7 along the outskirts of Stony Mountain, the two heading south as a four-lane divided highway for a few kilometers. PR 321 splits off and heads along the border with the Rural Municipality of Rosser once more along Fourth Base Line Road for a few kilometres through farmland to enter the Rural Municipality of West St. Paul as Rushman Road, becoming paved as it joins a short concurrency with PR 220 (Blackdale Road). Leaving PR 220 behind along Miller Road, PR 321 travels through rural areas for a few kilometres before coming to an end just south of Parkdale at an intersection with PTH 8 (McPhillips Street).

== Major intersections ==
Division	Location	km	mi	Destinations	Notes
Rosser–Rockwood boundary	Grosse Isle	0.0	0.0	PTH 6 (NWWR) – Winnipeg, Ashern	Western terminus; road continues as Road 72N (former PR 334 south)
Rosser–Rockwood boundary	Grosse Isle	0.9	0.56	PR 322 (Road 1E) – Argyle	Western end of unpaved section
Rosser–Rockwood boundary		9.1	5.7	PR 236 – Stonewall, Gordon	
Rockwood	Stony Mountain	17.1	10.6	PTH 7 north – Arborg; Road 73N – Stony Mountain	Western end of PTH 7 concurrency; eastern end of unpaved section
Rosser–Rockwood boundary		18.8	11.7	PTH 7 south – Winnipeg	Eastern end of PTH 7 concurrency; western end of unpaved section
Rockwood–West St. Paul boundary		25.4	15.8	PR 220 north (Blackdale Road)	Western end of PR 220 concurrency; eastern end of unpaved section
West St. Paul		27.0	16.8	PR 220 south (Blackdale Road)	Eastern end of PR 220 concurrency
West St. Paul		31.9	19.8	PTH 8 (McPhillips Street) – Gimli, Winnipeg	Eastern terminus; road continues east as Miller Road
1.000 mi = 1.609 km; 1.000 km = 0.621 mi: Concurrency terminus
