= Manitoba Provincial Road 323 =

Provincial Road in Manitoba, Canada

Provincial Road 323
- PR 323 highlighted in red

Route information
- Maintained by Department of Infrastructure
- Length: 26.5 km (16.5 mi)
- Existed: 1966–present

Major junctions
- West end: PTH 6 just south of Woodlands
- PR 322 in Argyle; PR 236 north of Stonewall
- East end: PTH 7 near Stonewall

Location
- Country: Canada
- Province: Manitoba
- Rural municipalities: Woodlands, Rockwood

Highway system
- Provincial highways in Manitoba; Winnipeg City Routes
← PR 322	→ PR 324

Provincial Road 323 (PR 323) is a 26.5-kilometre-long (16.5 mi) east-west highway in both the Interlake and Winnipeg Capital regions of Manitoba, Canada. It connects the towns of Woodlands and Stonewall via Argyle.

== Route description ==
PR 323 begins in the Rural Municipality of Woodlands at an intersection with PTH 6 (Northern Woods and Water Route) just south of the town of Woodlands. It heads due east as a two-lane gravel road through rural farmland for several kilometres, where it becomes concurrent with PR 322 just prior to entering the town of Argyle and the Rural Municipality of Rockwood. Being paved as it travels through the centre of town, PR 322 splits off and heads south shortly thereafter, with PR 323 becoming unpaved once more as it leaves Argyle and heads east through rural farmland. The highway crosses PR 236 just north of Stonewall before coming to an end at an intersection with PTH 7.

== History ==
Prior to 1992, PR 323 continued on further west past PTH 6 for 8 kilometres (5.0 mi) to come to an end at a junction with PR 248 north of Meadow Lea. It is now known as Road 80NW.

== Major intersections ==
Division	Location	km	mi	Destinations	Notes
Woodlands		0.0	0.0	PTH 6 (NWWR) – Warren, Woodlands; Road 80NW – St. Ambroise	Western terminus; road continues west as Road 80NW
Woodlands		0.0	0.0	PR 322 north – Erinview	Western end of PR 322 concurrency
Rockwood	Argyle	11.7	7.3	Meridian Road	Western end of paved section
Rockwood	Argyle	13.3	8.3	PR 322 south – Grosse Isle	Eastern end of PR 322 concurrency; eastern end of paved section
Rockwood		21.5	13.4	PR 236 – Stonewall, Balmoral	
Rockwood		26.5	16.5	PTH 7 – Teulon, Winnipeg	Eastern terminus; road continues east as Road 80N
1.000 mi = 1.609 km; 1.000 km = 0.621 mi: Concurrency terminus
