= Manitoba Highway 7 =

Highway in Manitoba

Provincial Trunk Highway 7
- PTH 7 highlighted in red

Route information
- Maintained by Manitoba Infrastructure
- Length: 104 km (65 mi)
- Existed: 1928–present

Major junctions
- South end: Route 90 in Winnipeg
- PTH 101 near Winnipeg; PTH 67 near Stonewall; PTH 17 at Teulon
- North end: PTH 68 at Arborg

Location
- Country: Canada
- Province: Manitoba
- Rural municipalities: Armstrong; Bifrost – Riverton; Rockwood; Rosser
- Major cities: Winnipeg
- Towns: Arborg; Teulon

Highway system
- Provincial highways in Manitoba; Winnipeg City Routes
← PTH 6	→ PTH 8

Provincial Trunk Highway 7 (PTH 7) is a provincial primary highway located in the Canadian province of Manitoba. It runs from the northern limit of the city of Winnipeg (where it meets with Route 90/Brookside Blvd.) north to Arborg, Manitoba where it intersects with PTH 68. The highway is twinned from Winnipeg to just north of PTH 67, an east–west route that provides access to the Town of Stonewall.

== Route description ==
PTH 7 begins in the Rural Municipality of Rosser at the Winnipeg city limits at an intersection with Mollard Road, with the road continuing south into Winnipeg as Winnipeg Route 90 (Route 90 / Brookside Boulevard). It heads north as a 4-lane divided Highway to immediately have a cloverleaf interchange with PTH 101 (North Perimeter Highway) just shortly before crossing into the Rural Municipality of Rockwood. The highway has a short concurrency (overlap) with PR 321 as it travels along the western side of Stony Mountain before traveling just to the east of Stonewall, where it has a junction with PTH 67. PTH 7 now narrows to 2-lanes and has intersections with PR 323 and PR 236 before the hamlet of Gunton and the town of Teulon, having intersections with PR 415 and PTH 17 as it bypasses downtown along its eastern side.

PTH 7 crosses into the Rural Municipality of Armstrong at an intersection with PR 229 in the community of Komarno, and continues traveling due northward to pass through the hamlets of Fraserwood, where it has a concurrency with PR 231, Meleb, and Silver before entering the Municipality of Bifrost - Riverton. It enters the town of Arborg shortly thereafter and comes to an end at an intersection with PTH 68 just southeast of downtown, near the banks of the Icelandic River.

== History ==
PTH 7 first appeared on the 1928 Manitoba Highway Map as a short feeder route connecting Stonewall and Winnipeg. When PTH 6 was opened to traffic in 1947, it incorporated a small portion of the original PTH 7. That same year, a second leg of PTH 7 was opened connecting Stony Mountain to Teulon.

PTH 7 was rerouted through Stony Mountain in 1951, bypassing Stonewall completely. It extended further north to the village of Komarno the following year, and to Fraserwood in 1955.

In 1956, PTH 7 was extended west of Fraserwood on to what is now PTH 17 as far as Narcisse. The highway was extended to Chatfield the following year, before reaching PTH 68 at Poplarfield in 1959. PTH 7 was extended to Fisher Branch in 1960.

In 1966, PTH 7 was reconfigured to its current northern terminus with PTH 68 at Arborg from Fraserwood, and the route between Fraserwood and Fisher Branch was redesignated as PTH 16. The original route was given its current PTH 17 designation in 1977.

PTH 7 formerly extended into the city of Winnipeg. Prior to 1966, PTH 7 followed present-day Winnipeg Route 90, under numerous different street names, to PTH 1 / PTH 4 (Portage Avenue), cosigned with PTH 6 for a 8-kilometre (5 mi) section between present-day PTH 101 and Logan Avenue. When the Winnipeg Metro Routes were established in c. 1966, the section of PTH 7 inside the Perimeter Highway was decommissioned; however, currently PTH 7 still exists between the Perimeter Highway and Winnipeg city limits.

== Major intersections ==
Division	Location	km	mi	Destinations	Notes
City of Winnipeg		−13.1	−8.1	Century Street (Route 90 south) PTH 1 / Portage Avenue (Route 85)	Former PTH 7 southern terminus; former PTH 1 / PTH 4 concurrency
City of Winnipeg		−10.6	−6.6	Wellington Avenue	To Winnipeg James Armstrong Richardson International Airport
City of Winnipeg		−7.9	−4.9	Logan Avenue (Route 47 east)	Former PTH 6 south; former south end of PTH 6 concurrency
City of Winnipeg		0.0	0.0	Route 90 ends Mollard Road	Winnipeg city limits; PTH 7 southern terminus; Route 90 northern terminus
Rosser		1.6	0.99	Perimeter Highway (PTH 101)	Interchange; PTH 101 exit 60; former PTH 6 north; former north end of PTH 6 concurrency
↑ / ↓		9.8	6.1	PR 321 east (Rushman Road)	South end of PR 321 concurrency
Rockwood	Stony Mountain	11.5	7.1	PR 321 west / Road 73N – Grosse Isle, Stony Mountain	North end of PR 321 concurrency
Rockwood		18.4	11.4	PTH 67 – Stonewall, Selkirk	
Rockwood		23.3	14.5	PR 323 west – Argyle	
Rockwood		31.5	19.6	PR 236 west – Balmoral	
Rockwood		38.1	23.7	Arundel Avenue (Road 89N) – Gunton	
Town of Teulon		44.6	27.7	PR 415 west	
Town of Teulon		46.3	28.8	PTH 17 – Fisher Branch	
Rockwood		57.5	35.7	First Street (Road 101N) – Komarno	
↑ / ↓		60.4	37.5	PR 229 – Inwood, Winnipeg Beach	
Armstrong		68.6	42.6	Main Street (Road 107N) – Malonton	
Armstrong	Fraserwood	75.2	46.7	PR 231 east – Gimli	South end of PR 231 concurrency
Armstrong		78.2	48.6	PR 231 west – Fisher Branch	North end of PR 231 concurrency
Armstrong	Meleb	89.0	55.3	Road 117N – Meleb	
Armstrong	Rembrandt	97.2	60.4	Road 122N – Rembrandt	Former PR 324 east
Armstrong	Silver	102.1	63.4	Road 125N – Silver	
Bifrost-Riverton	No major junctions				
Town of Arborg		104.4	64.9	PTH 68 – Poplarfield, Eriksdale, Hnausa	PTH 7 northern terminus
1.000 mi = 1.609 km; 1.000 km = 0.621 mi: Closed/former; Concurrency terminus; Route transition
