= Manitoba Highway 67 =

Provincial highway in Manitoba, Canada

Provincial Trunk Highway 67
- Fort Garry Road
- PTH 20 highlighted in red

Route information
- Maintained by Manitoba Infrastructure
- Length: 46 km (29 mi)
- Existed: 1963–present

Major junctions
- West end: PTH 6 near Warren
- PTH 7 near Stonewall; PTH 8 near Selkirk
- East end: PTH 9 at Lower Fort Garry

Location
- Country: Canada
- Province: Manitoba
- Rural municipalities: St. Andrews; Rockwood; Woodlands
- Towns: Stonewall

Highway system
- Provincial highways in Manitoba; Winnipeg City Routes
← PTH 60	→ PTH 68

Provincial Trunk Highway 67 (PTH 67) is a short provincial highway in the Canadian province of Manitoba. It runs as an east-west route just north of Winnipeg city limits between PTH 6 near the village of Warren to PTH 9 at the gate to Lower Fort Garry.

PTH 67 is the main highway through the town of Stonewall. The speed limit is 100 km/h (62 mph).

== History ==
Provincial Road 223
- Fort Garry Road
- Location: Stonewall - Lower Fort Garry
- Length: 24.5 km (15.2 mi)
- Existed: 1966–1983

PTH 67 first appeared on the 1963 Manitoba Highway Map. Originally, it was a short connector highway spanning 21 kilometres (13 mi) through Stonewall between PTH 6 and PTH 7. Between PTH 7 and PTH 9, the highway was known as Provincial Road 223 (PR 223) after the provincial government implemented the Secondary Highway system in 1966.

PTH 67 was extended on to PR 223 (which was decommissioned in its entirety) in 1983.

== Major intersections ==
Division	Location	km	mi	Destinations	Notes
Woodlands	Warren	0	0.0	PTH 6 (NWWR) – Ashern, Eriksdale, Thompson	Western terminus
Woodlands		6.6	4.1	PR 322 – Grosse Isle, Argyle	
Town of Stonewall		14.8	9.2	PR 236 south – Winnipeg	West end of PR 236 / Fourth Street East concurrency
Town of Stonewall		16.5	10.3	PR 236 north (Fourth Street E) – Balmoral	East end of PR 236 / Fourth Street East concurrency
Rockwood		21.4	13.3	PTH 7 – Arborg, Teulon, Winnipeg	
Rockwood		29.5	18.3	PR 220 – Oak Hammock Marsh	
St. Andrews		36.0	22.4	PTH 8 (Veterans Memorial Highway) – Gimli, Winnipeg	
St. Andrews		42.6	26.5	PR 230 (McPhillips Road) – Selkirk	
St. Andrews	Lower Fort Garry	45.9	28.5	PTH 9 (Main Street) – Selkirk, Winnipeg	Eastern terminus
1.000 mi = 1.609 km; 1.000 km = 0.621 mi: Concurrency terminus
