= Manitoba Provincial Road 220 =

Provincial road in Manitoba, Canada

Provincial Road 220
- Grassmere Road; Blackdale Road
- PR 220 highlighted in red

Route information
- Maintained by Manitoba Infrastructure
- Length: 21.1 km (13.1 mi)
- Existed: 1966–present

Major junctions
- South end: PTH 8 near Winnipeg
- PR 321 near Stony Mountain; PTH 67 near Oak Hammock Marsh
- North end: Oak Hammock Marsh

Location
- Country: Canada
- Province: Manitoba
- Rural municipalities: Rockwood; West. St. Paul

Highway system
- Provincial highways in Manitoba; Winnipeg City Routes
← PR 218	→ PR 221

Provincial Road 220 (PR 220) is a 21.1-kilometre-long (13.1 mi) north-south provincial road in both the Interlake and Winnipeg Metro regions of Manitoba. It connects suburbs on the northern edge of Winnipeg with PTH 8, PTH 67, and Oak Hammock Marsh. Between PTH 8 and PR 409, PR 220 is named Grassmere Road, with the rest of its length known as Blackdale Road.

== Route description ==
PR 220 begins at Provincial Trunk Highway (PTH) 8 approximately 1 kilometre (0.6 mi) north of the Winnipeg's Perimeter Highway. It runs northwest in concurrency with Grassemere Road to a junction with PR 409 and then turns north, heading to Provincial Trunk Highway (PTH) 67.

North of PTH 67, PR 220 continues 3.75 kilometres (2.33 mi) to Oak Hammock Marsh where its designated route terminates at the park's access road. The road itself continues a short distance as Municipal Road 14E. This section was added to PR 220 in the mid-1980s.

== Major intersections ==
Division	Location	km	mi	Destinations	Notes
West St. Paul		0.0	0.0	PTH 8 (McPhillips Street) – Winnipeg, Gimli	Southern terminus; road continues as Grassmere Road
West St. Paul		3.3	2.1	PR 409 west (Grassmere Road)	Eastern terminus of PR 409
West St. Paul		7.5	4.7	PR 321 east (Miller Road)	Southern end of PR 321 concurrency (overlap)
West St. Paul / Rockwood boundary		9.2	5.7	PR 321 west (Rushman Road) – Stony Mountain	Northern end of PR 321 concurrency; southern end of unpaved section
Rockwood		17.4	10.8	PTH 67 (Fort Garry Road) – Stonewall, Selkirk	Northern end of unpaved section
Rockwood	Oak Hammock Marsh	21.1	13.1	Snow Goose Bay – Oak Hammock Marsh	Northern terminus; road continues north for a short distance as Road 14E
1.000 mi = 1.609 km; 1.000 km = 0.621 mi: Concurrency terminus
