= Gunton, Manitoba =

Gunton
- Unincorporated community
- Location of Gunton in Manitoba
- Coordinates: 50°19′05″N 97°15′58″W
- Country: Canada
- Province: Manitoba
- Region: Winnipeg Capital Region
- Rural municipality: Rockwood

Population (2013)
  - Total: c.200
- Time zone: UTC-6 (CST)
  - Summer (DST): UTC-5 (CDT)
- Postal Code: R0C 1H0
- Area code: 204

Gunton is an unincorporated community located 40 km (25 mi) north of Winnipeg, Manitoba, Canada in the Rural Municipality of Rockwood. It has no major industry, as most residents work in Winnipeg or nearby communities. It has a bull test station (the only one in the Interlake Region) and an abandoned quarry.

The community's origin can be traced to 1904, when Donald Gunn started a limestone quarry on the south side of the current community's location. At one time when the quarry was operating it employed hundreds of people and the town had a population of approximately 3,000. In 1905, a post office with the name "Gunview" was opened, then name was changed to Gunton in 1906. The quarries closed during World War I, but the community remained as a farming community.

It was featured in the 1997 made-for-TV movie, Trucks.

== See also ==
- List of communities in Manitoba
