= Dale McFee =

Canadian police chief (born 1965)

Dale McFee OOM

Chief of the Edmonton Police Service
- In office February 1, 2019 – February 21, 2025
- Preceded by: Rod Knecht
- Succeeded by: Devin Laforce (interim) Warren Driechel (interim)

Personal details
- Born: 1965 (age 60–61) Grosse Isle, Manitoba, Canada
- Occupation: Police officer

Dale McFee is the former Chief of the Edmonton Police Service. He is the former president of the Canadian Association of Chiefs of Police and the former deputy minister of Corrections and Policing in Saskatchewan. McFee was the first Métis police chief in Alberta.

== Early life and education ==
McFee grew up in Grosse Isle, Manitoba, moving to St. Albert, Alberta at the age of 13.

== Hockey career ==
McFee was recruited to join the Prince Albert Raiders at the age of 16, playing from 1982 to 1986, winning the Memorial Cup in 1985. He was an assistant coach from 1990 to 1992, and served as president from 2007 to 2016. His sports career includes playing in provincial championship teams in hockey, baseball, and football.

== Policing career ==
McFee has served as a police officer since 1993. From 2011 to 2014 McFee was president of the Canadian Association of Chiefs of Police. McFree retired as the Chief of Police of the Edmonton Police Service in February 2025.

=== Prince Albert Police Service ===
McFee began his policing career at the Prince Albert Police Service. During his time as chief of police, McFee increased Indigenous officer representation by 38 percent.

=== Edmonton Police Service ===
McFee was hired as a reformer with a mandate to increase diversity within the Edmonton Police Service. In 2022, McFee faced criticism when it was revealed through a freedom of information request that he was the second-highest paid chief of police in Canada, at $340,000 a year.

== Scholarship ==
McFee is co-author on journal articles and chapters covering policing, mental health, and reconciliation.

== See also ==
- Edmonton Police Service
- The Métis
- Prince Albert Raiders
- Alex Decoteau
