= Silver, Manitoba =

Silver is an unincorporated community in the province of Manitoba, Canada. It is located approximately 8 km (5.0 mi) south of Arborg within the Rural Municipality of Armstrong.

Silver began as a Canadian Pacific Railway point in 1911 and was named after N. T. Silver, a contractor who shipped wood from the location. One map source from 1914 showed the locality as being named Silver Spur. The Post Office opened in 1918 on 35-21-2E. In its heyday, Silver was host to a few general stores. Cord wood and grain were the primary resources shipped by train, and passenger services included a morning train south to Winnipeg and a night train north to Arborg. The small community church of St. John's Ukrainian Catholic is located on the west side of Provincial Trunk Highway 7 but closed in the early 2010s due to low attendance. Approximately 3 km (1.9 mi) to the west is Silver's only cemetery, St. John's Parish Cemetery (50.834567°N 97.252196°W).

In 1991, a new community centre was built in Silver and serves as staging grounds for multiple events, including the Silver Western Days (last Saturday in May) and the Silver Picnic (second Sunday in August).

== Notable individuals ==
- Pte. Charles Rychlicki (1923 - July 20, 1944), born in Silver and served with The South Saskatchewan Regiment in World War II. Rychlicki was killed in action during the Battle of Verrières Ridge in Operation Atlantic. He is buried in Bretteville-sur-Laize Canadian War Cemetery in France. Rychlicki Lake in northern Manitoba was named after him (58.385278°N 98.779167°W) on January 31, 1975 by the Canadian Permanent Committee on Geographical Names. His name is also memorialized on a World War II commemorative cairn in Meleb-Park-Cumming Schools Reunion Park in nearby Meleb, Manitoba.

== Gallery ==
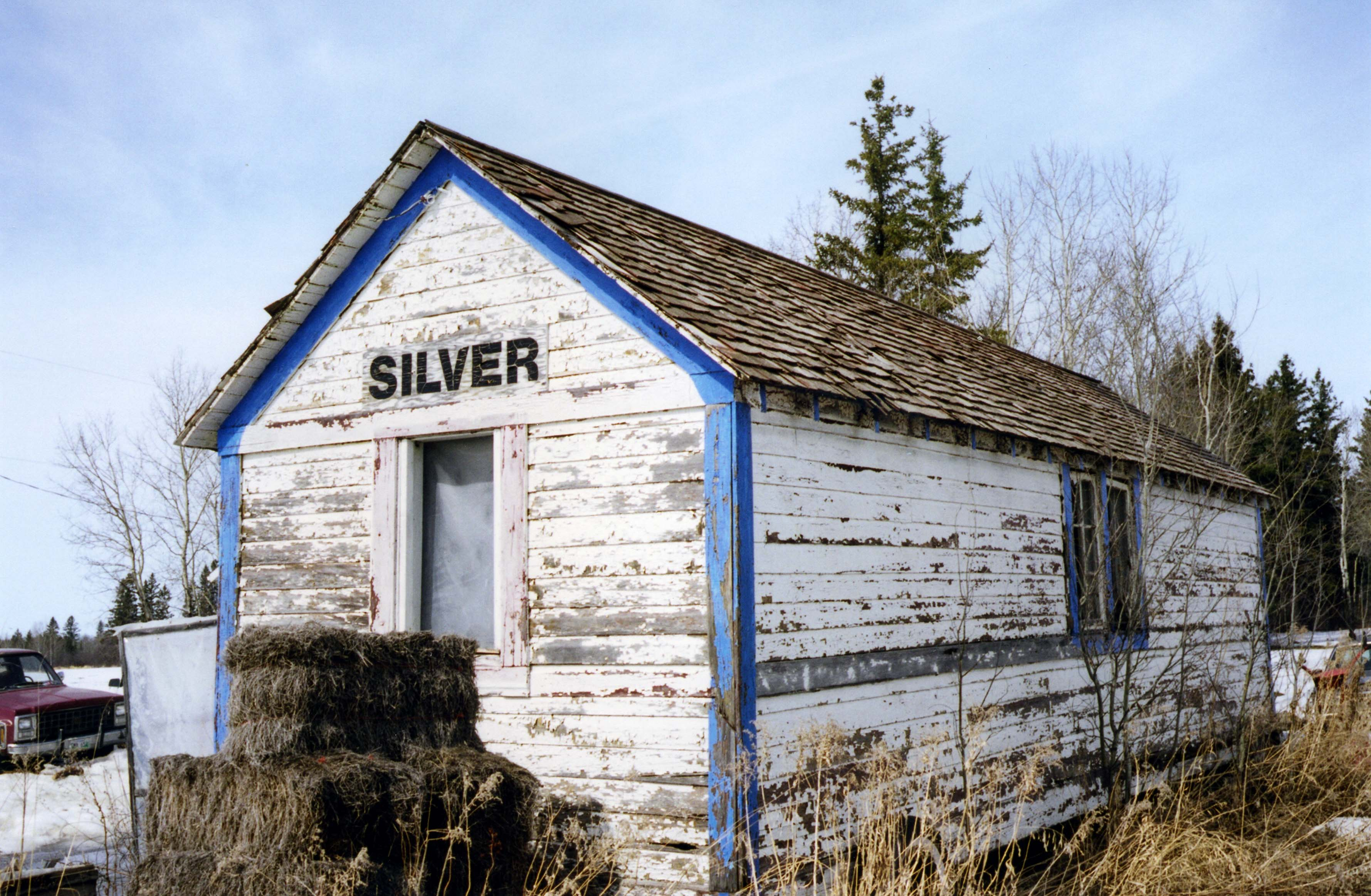
Silver Train Station, Silver, Manitoba, Canada

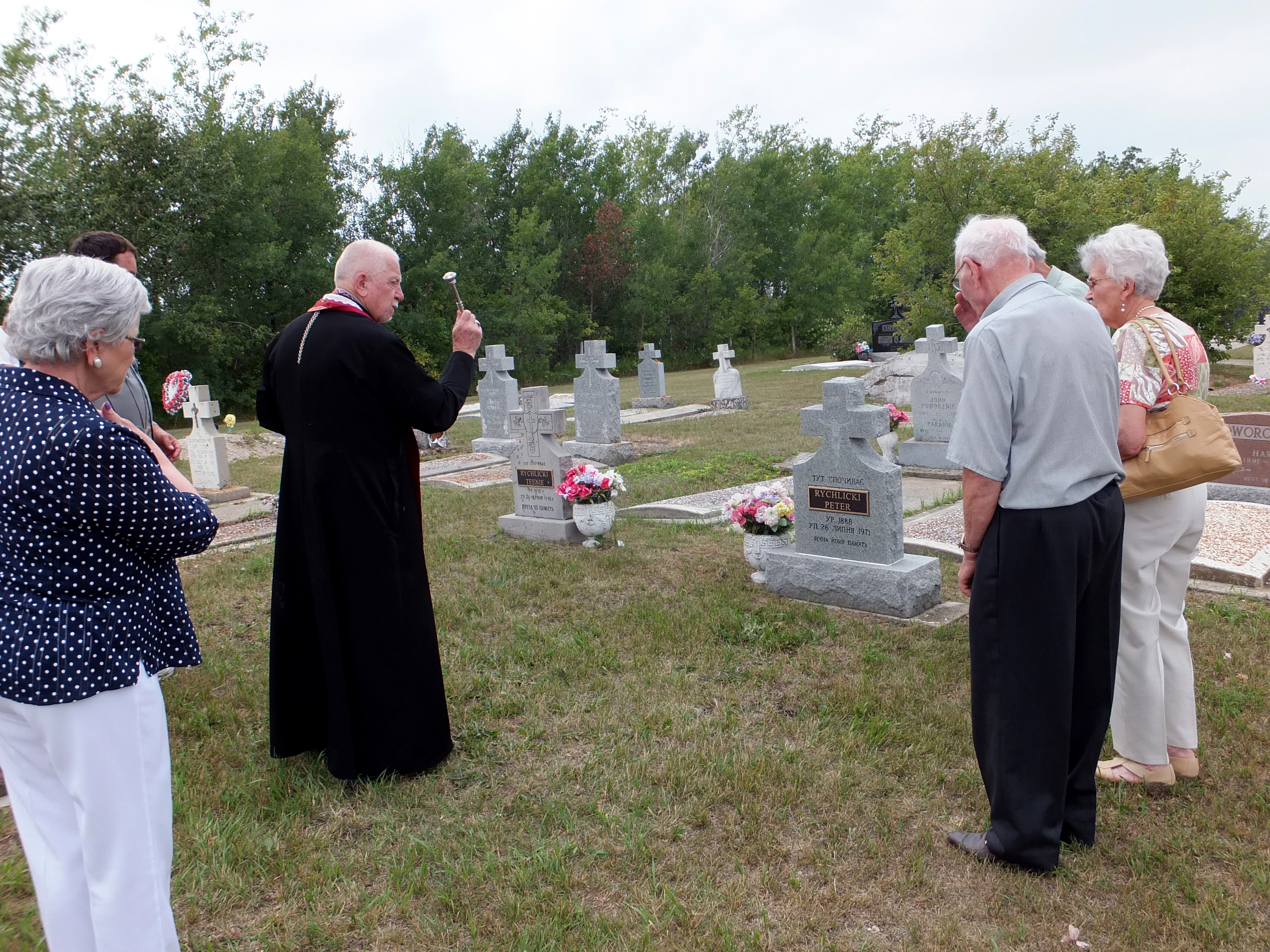
Ukrainian Catholic priest blessing graves, St. John's Cemetery

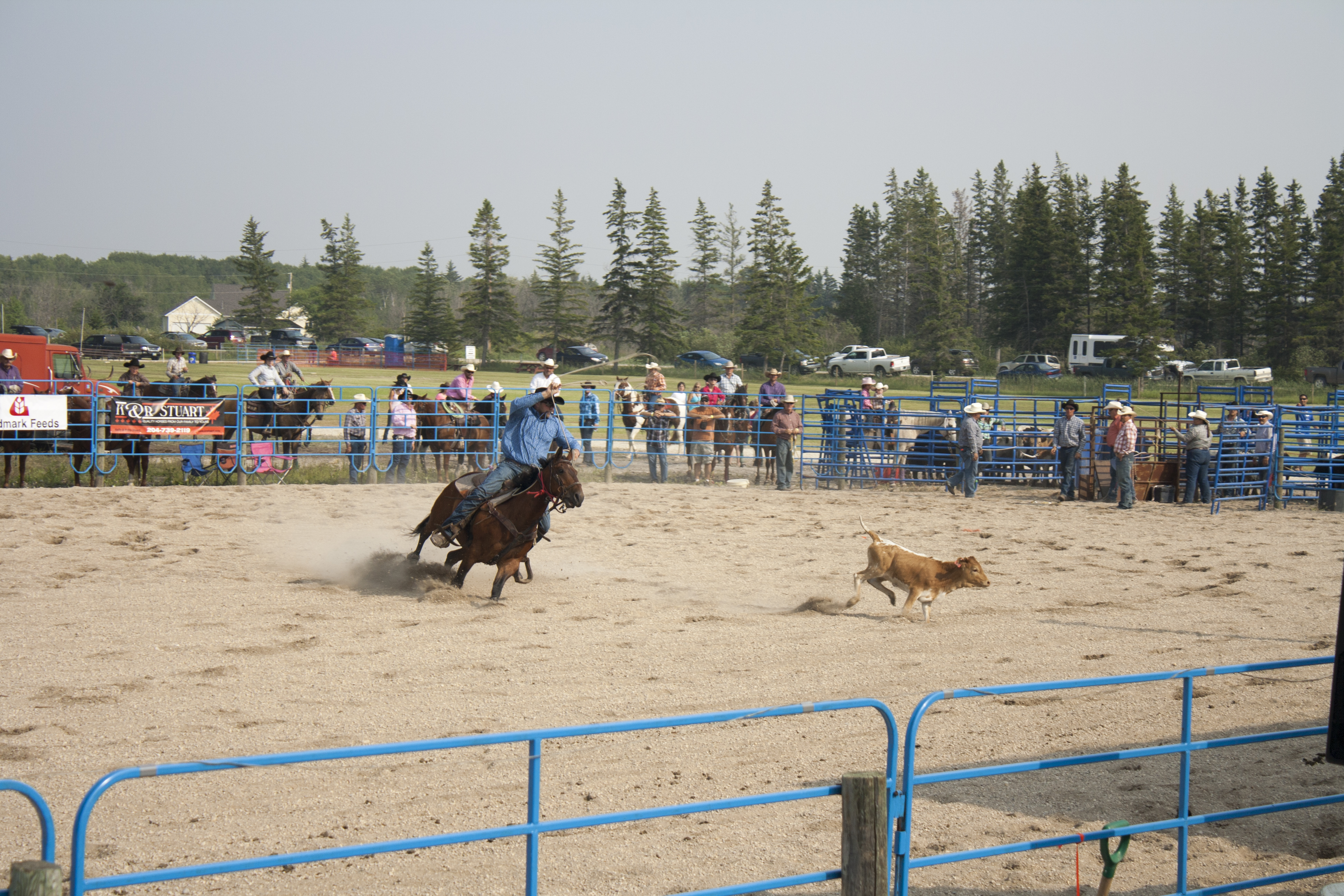
Arborg & District Agricultural Fair and Rodeo

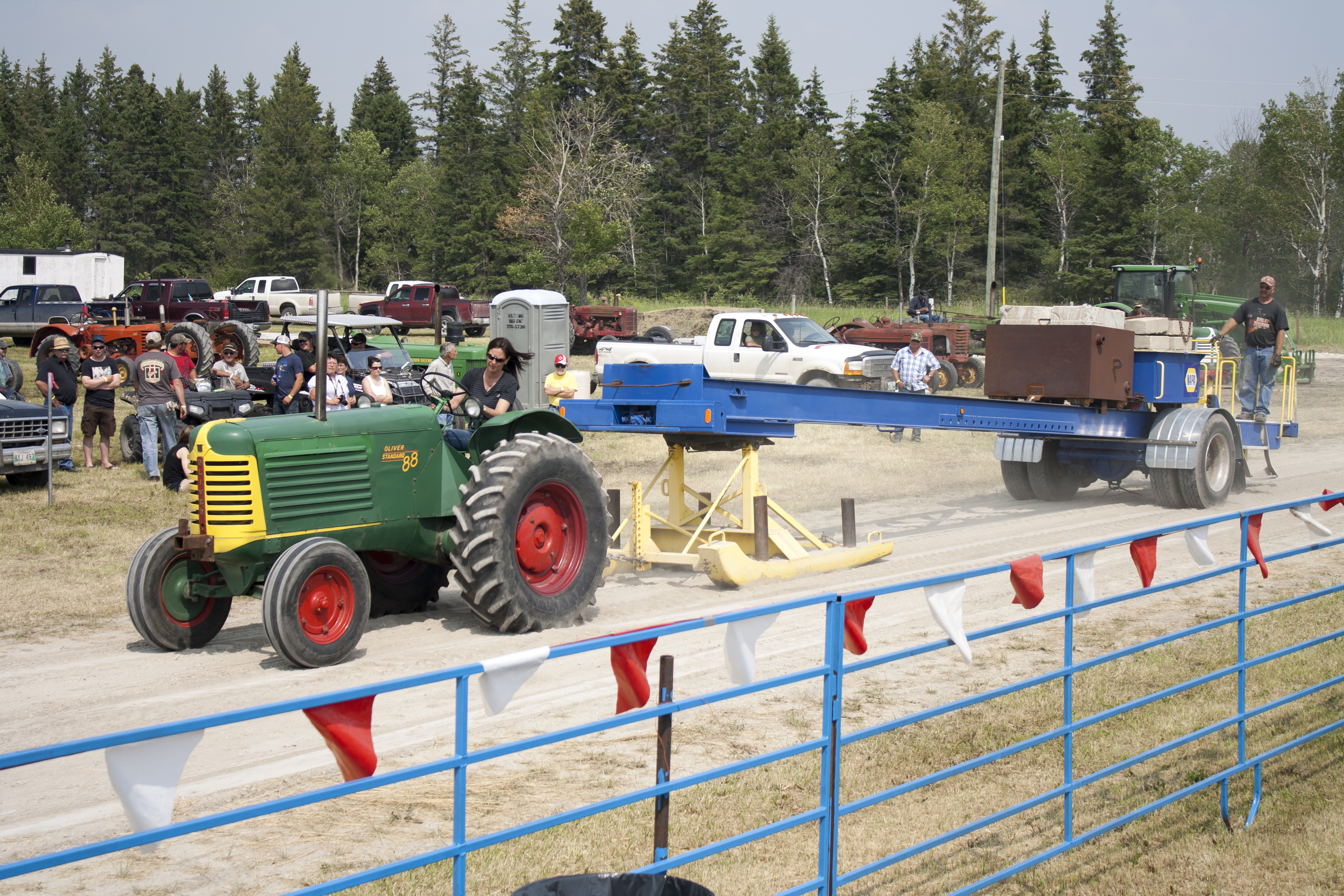
Arborg & District Agricultural Fair and Rodeo - Tractor pull contest
