= Gordon, Manitoba =

Gordon
- Village
- Location of Gordon in Manitoba
- Coordinates: 50°00′00″N 97°20′39″W
- Country: Canada
- Province: Manitoba

Government
  - MP (Selkirk—Interlake—Eastman): James Bezan (CPC)
  - MLA (Lakeside): Trevor King (PC)
  - Reeve (R.M. of Rosser): Frances Smee
- Elevation: 240 m (790 ft)
- Time zone: UTC-6 (CST)
  - Summer (DST): UTC-5 (CDT)
- Postal Code: R0H 1E0

Gordon is an unincorporated community in Manitoba, Canada, within the Rural Municipality of Rosser. The community is centred on PTH 6, approximately 3.5 kilometres (2.2 miles) north-west of Winnipeg and 9.5 kilometres (5.9 miles) south-east of Grosse Isle. It is named for James Gordon, who was in charge of leases in the General Manager's Office of the Canadian National Railway.

== History ==
The railway point on the CNR Oak Point subdivision, operated by the Canadian National Railway, was established in 1905. In 1928, a grain elevator was built by Manitoba Pool Elevators. It was closed in 1988 and demolished the next year. A post office was opened in 1929, but it was closed in 1952.
