= Prairie Dog Central Railway =

Heritage railway in Manitoba, Canada

Coordinates: 49.9513°N 97.2697°W

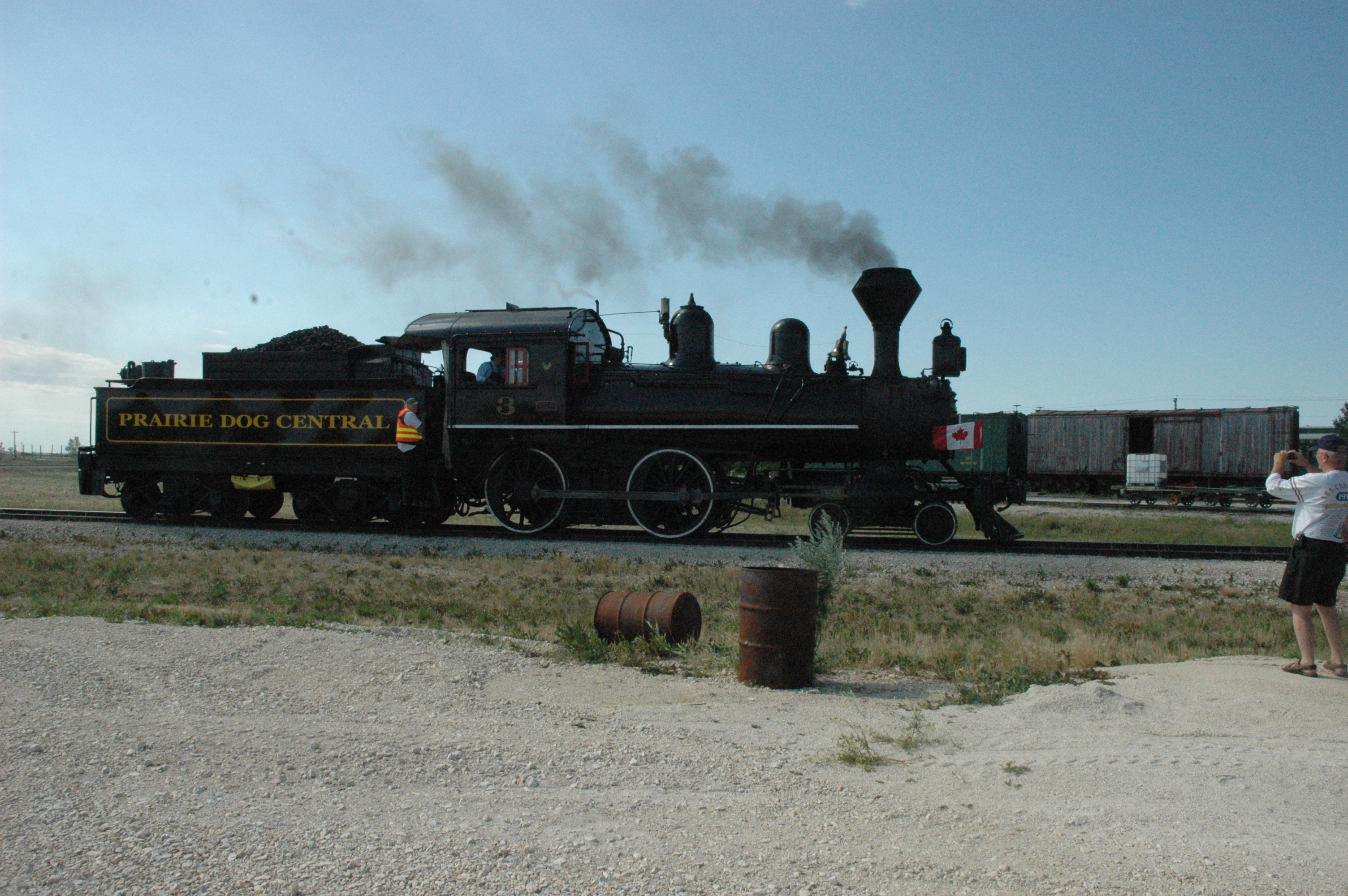

Commercial operations
- Built by: Canadian Northern Railway
- Original gauge: 4 ft 8 1/2 in (1,435 mm)

Preserved operations
- Owned by: The Vintage Locomotive Society Inc.
- Reporting mark: PDC
- Length: 9.3 miles (15 km)
- Preserved gauge: 4 ft 8 1/2 in (1,435 mm)

Commercial history
- Opened: 1905 / 1910; Current track

Preservation history
- 1970 to 1974: Prairie Dog Central Railway operated on the now abandoned Canadian National Cabot Subdivision
- 1975 to 1996: Prairie Dog Central Railway operated on the now abandoned Canadian National Railways Oak Point Subdivision
- 1999: Prairie Dog Central Railway purchases and moves to the former CN Oak Point Subdivision
- Headquarters: Winnipeg, Manitoba, Canada

Website
- Railway's website

The Prairie Dog Central Railway (reporting mark PDC) is a heritage railway just outside Winnipeg, Manitoba, Canada.

Regular trips are every Saturday, Sunday and Holiday Monday from May through September, and last almost four hours with one stop in the rural community of Grosse Isle. Special dinner excursions occur during the season, as well as the Howlin' Halloween Express Trains in October. Details of the operations can be found by reviewing the schedules. Private Charters, School Programs and Engineer for a Day are also available.

== History ==
Initiated in 1970 by The Vintage Locomotive Society Inc., the first operations were in July, 1970. From 1970–1974, the train operated out of Charleswood on the now-abandoned Canadian National Cabot Subdivision. From 1975 to 1996 the train operated out of St. James, immediately west of Polo Park on a now abandoned Canadian National Railways line.

In 1999 the station, now a Federal Heritage Site, was moved to its present location at Inkster Junction in Rosser. The Vintage Locomotive Society Inc. purchased the former Oak Point Subdivision from Canadian National Railways in 1999. Originally constructed between 1905 and 1910 by Mackenzie & Mann for the Canadian Northern Railway, it became part of the cross-Canada Canadian National Railways system in 1923.

The subdivision is connected to Canadian Pacific Railway’s east-west main line and the portion of the former subdivision used by the Prairie Dog Central extends to about 2 miles (3.2 km) north of Warren. The remainder of the original line has now been abandoned.

== Locomotives and rolling stock ==
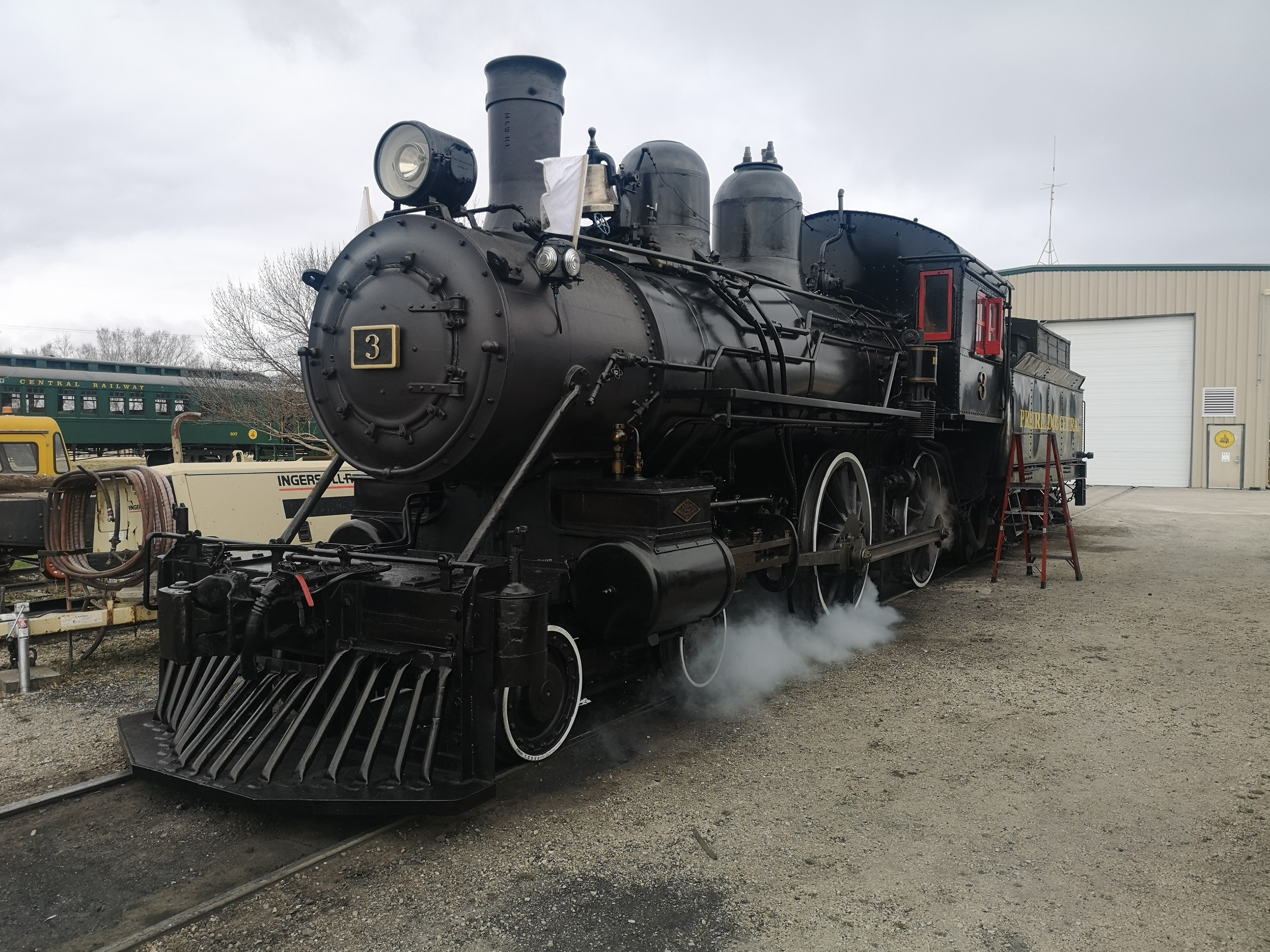
Heritage steam locomotive being steamed up

Locomotive No. 3 is a 4-4-0 built in 1882 by Dübs and Company in Glasgow, Scotland, for the Canadian Pacific Railway, and later for the City of Winnipeg Hydro. From 2001 to 2009, it underwent a complete frame-off overhaul, including the manufacture of a new boiler. No. 3 is the oldest operating steam locomotive in Canada.

Locomotive 4138 is a classic EMD GP9 diesel locomotive which was built in November 1958 by Electro-Motive Division of General Motors at La Grange, Illinois, for the Grand Trunk Western. A GP9 model, it has 1,750 horsepower (1,300 kW).

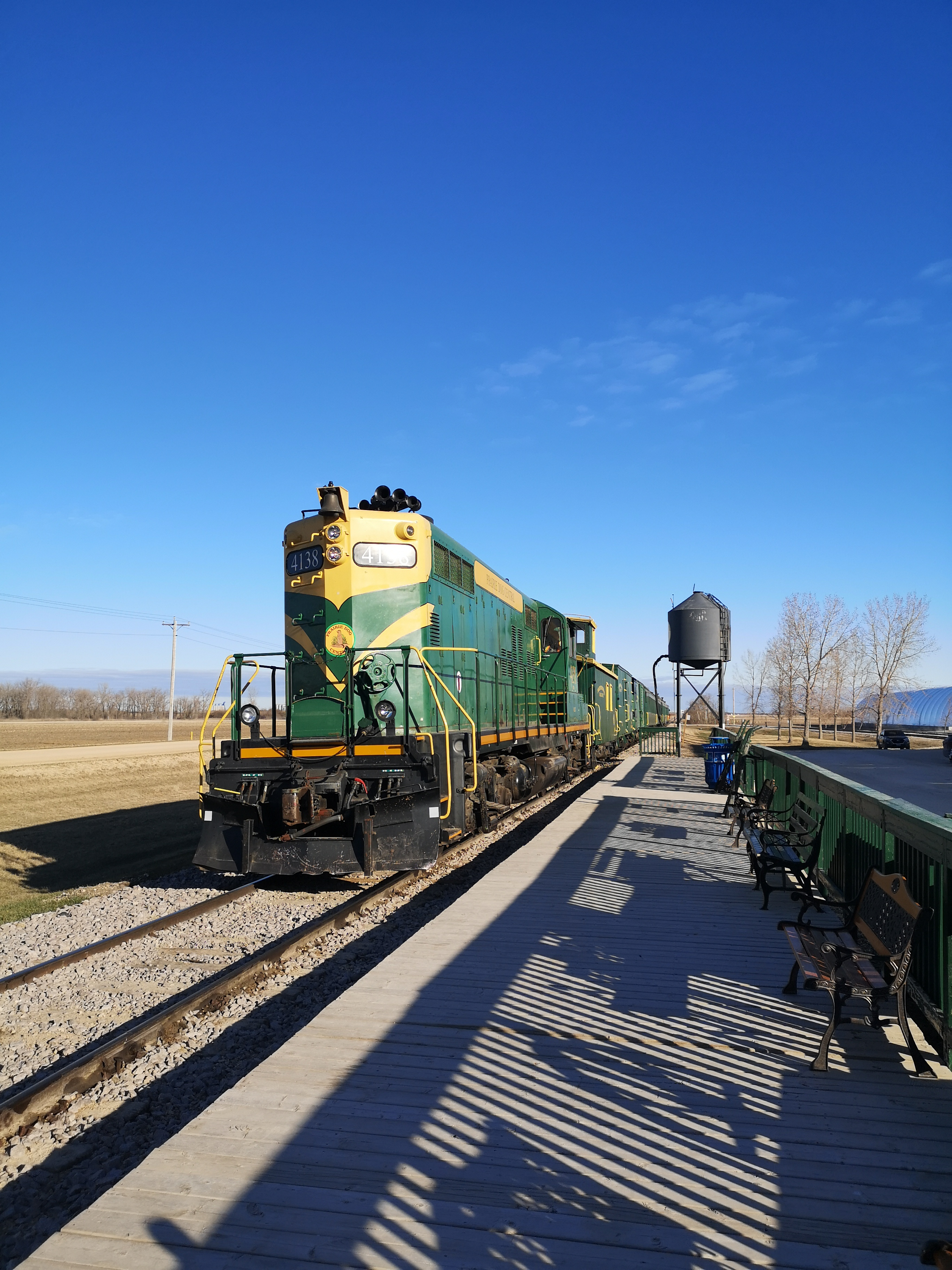
Vintage diesel locomotive at Prairie Dog Central

Locomotive 1685 is also an EMD GP9 diesel locomotive. It was built for the Midland Railway Company of Manitoba by General Motors at their Electromotive Division plant in London, Ontario. Completed in March 1957 with builders number A1091, it was sent directly to Winnipeg to replace Midland Railway Engine Number 1. 1685 served all of its time out of Winnipeg, and only went to the U.S. for heavy maintenance. Locally, 1685 switched in and around Winnipeg on the Midland trackage which served the fruit warehouses while they were serviced by rail.

During the years that 1685 ventured beyond Winnipeg, it regularly traveled to Emerson on the daily freight until that was discontinued. At times it assisted with the former Great Northern passenger train which ran between Minneapolis and Winnipeg. As built, 1685 originally had a steam generator for that purpose. 1685 was not substantially modified over the years. Other than carrying the Burlington Northern paint scheme when BN took over the Midland, and then again when she became BNSF 1685 in 1999, the only major modification was the removal of the steam generator. According to motive power rosters, 1685 was the last GP-9 owned by BNSF.

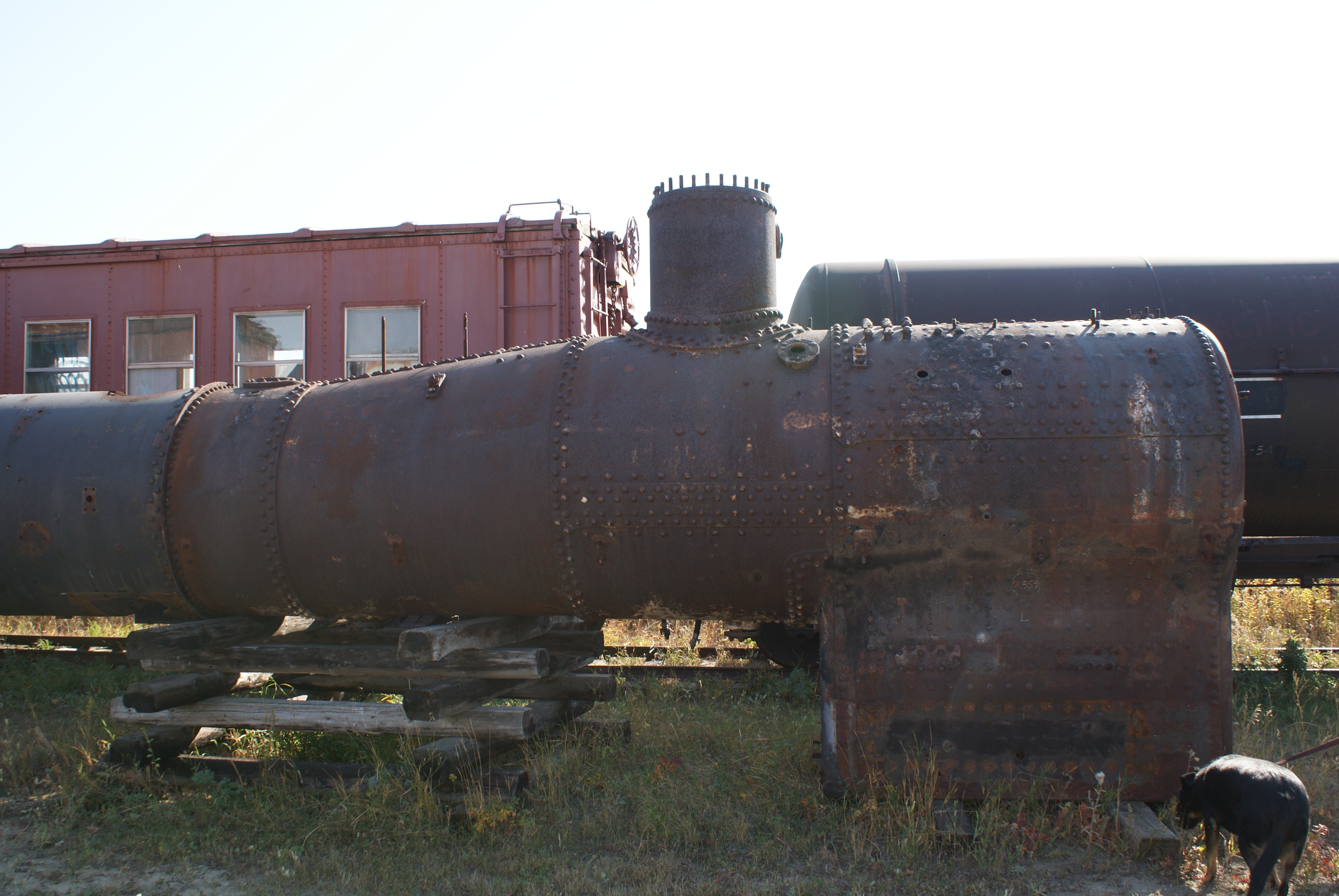
A boiler used by the Prairie Dog Central Railway

Coach 103 was built in 1908 by the Pullman Company of Chicago, Illinois, for the Keweenaw Central Railway of Calumet, Michigan. Ceasing operations a few years later it was purchased by the Winnipeg Light and Power Co. in 1920. It has remained the property of that organization, its successor City of Winnipeg Hydro (now Manitoba Hydro) and is leased to The Vintage Locomotive Society for use with the Prairie Dog Central Railway.

A "Combination Coach" has an area intended for baggage and the remainder is equipped with passenger seats. The baggage area is used for the train crew, and to accommodate special equipment required for operation.

This coach is always located immediately behind the locomotive in the train because Canadian federal operating regulations require that there be a buffer between a steam engine/tender and passenger area. The baggage compartment area satisfies this regulation.

It has been completely restored to its original condition featuring oak paneling, opaque vent windows, pot bellied stove, and lavatory.

A coach of this type was often used in mixed trains along with boxcars serving the freight and transportation needs of prairie villages. Coach 103 has a maximum seating capacity of 36 passengers and has been named "Gordon Younger" in honor of a founding member of The Vintage Locomotive Society Inc.

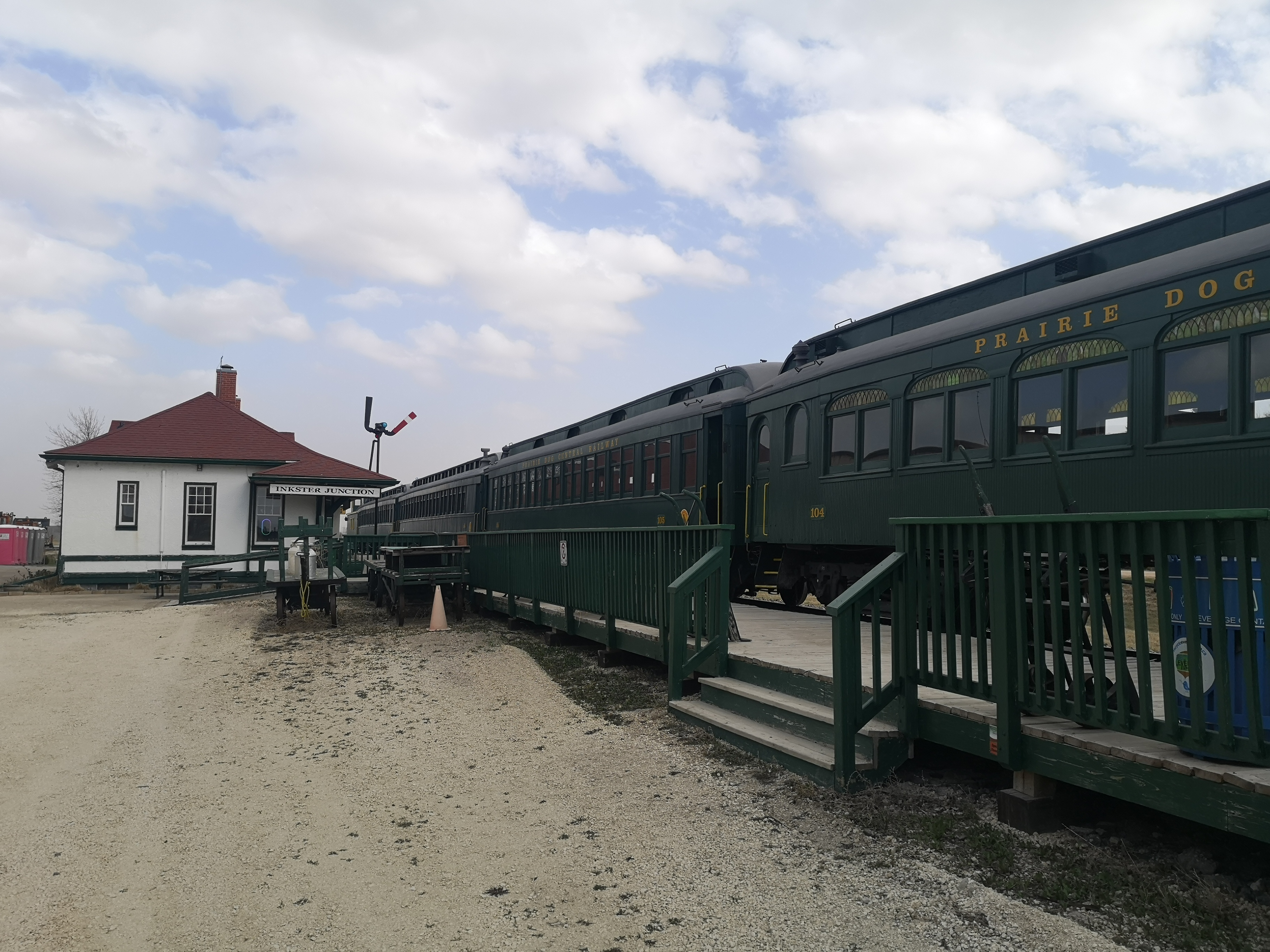
Rake of coaches at Prairie Dog Central heritage railway

Coach 104 was built in 1906 by the Crossen Coach Company of Cobourg, Ontario, for the Canadian Northern Railway, it remained in service until it was sold to the Greater Winnipeg Water District Railway (GWWD) in 1954. The Vintage Locomotive Society Inc. purchased it from GWWD in 1970.

This coach has been fully restored and features oak and mahogany panel interior, leaded windows, “pinch gas” light fixtures suspended from the ceiling, separate men's and women's lavatories, a coal stove and a smoking compartment.

Built in 1901 by the Barney and Smith Car Company of Dayton, Ohio, for the Canadian Northern Railway, Coach 105 is the oldest of the Prairie Dog Central Railway’s passenger equipment. It has been fully restored and features an arched interior clerestory roof, inlaid mahogany paneling, a distinctive smoking compartment, separate men's and women's lavatories, and a pot bellied coal stove.

Coach 106 was constructed in 1913 by the Canadian Pacific Railway at Angus Shops, Quebec. The Vintage Locomotive Society acquired it from the GWWD in 1969 and placed it into service in 1974. This wooden coach features mahogany paneling with oak accessories, a continuous brass rack above the seats, original stained glass in the vent windows and slider window blinds.

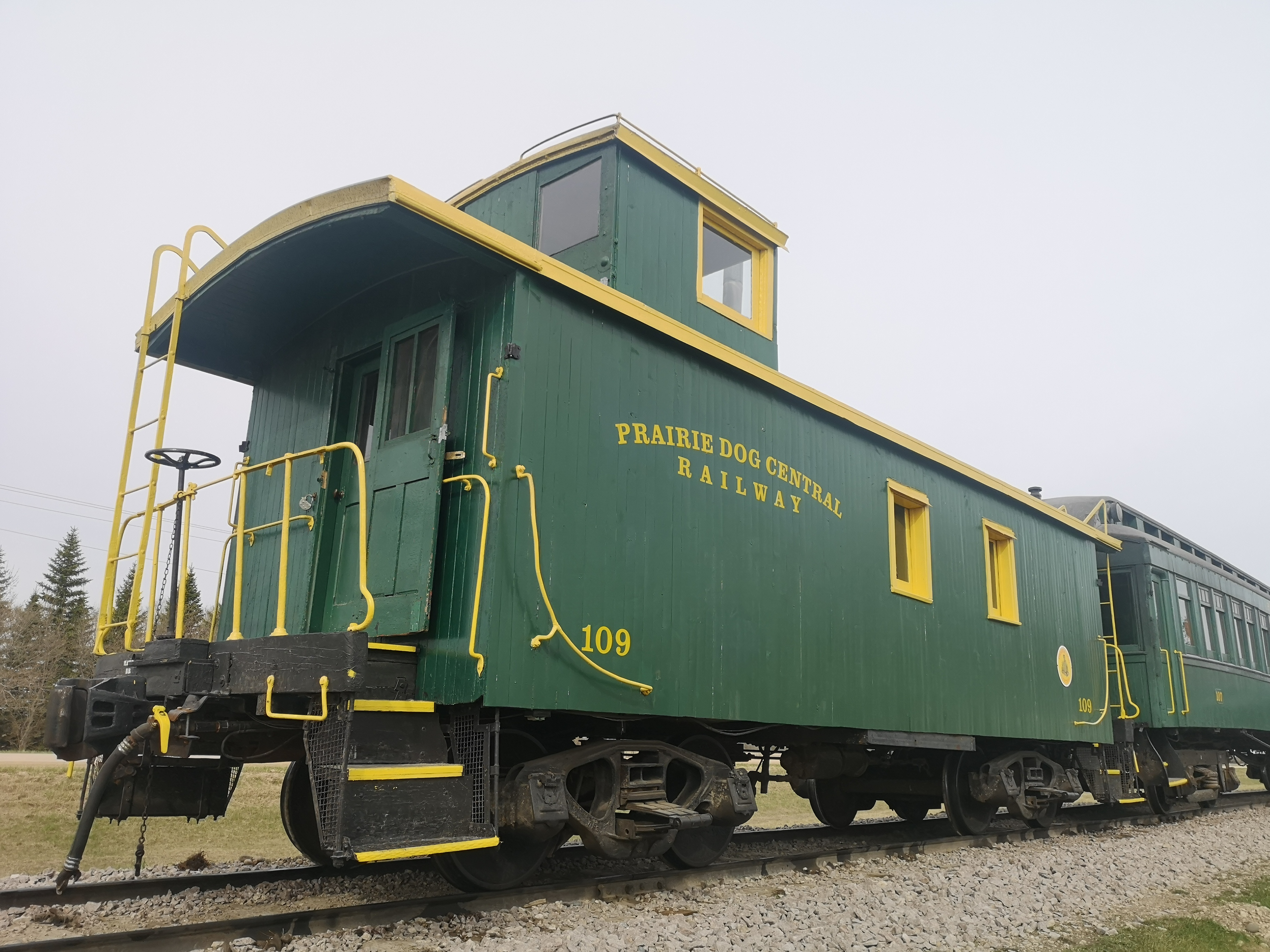
Caboose 109 running on Prairie Dog Central heritage railway

Built in 1911 by the Canadian Pacific Railway at Angus Shops, Quebec, Coach 107 was sold to the Greater Winnipeg Water District Railway (GWWD) in 1956, and became the property of the Vintage Locomotive Society Inc. in 1970 through an equipment trade with the GWWD and was placed in service in 1972.

Featuring mahogany and oak paneling, suspended “pinch gas” lamps, brass match striker plates at every seat, separate men's and women's lavatories and a pot bellied coal stove, it is always the last coach primarily because it has a full-width enclosed vestibule with windows looking back on the track. This area is useful for the Conductor and Trainman when the train is being operated in reverse as it permits a vantage point for safe backward movement under their control and in communication with the Locomotive Engineer.

== See also ==
- List of heritage railways in Canada
