= Teulon =

- Town
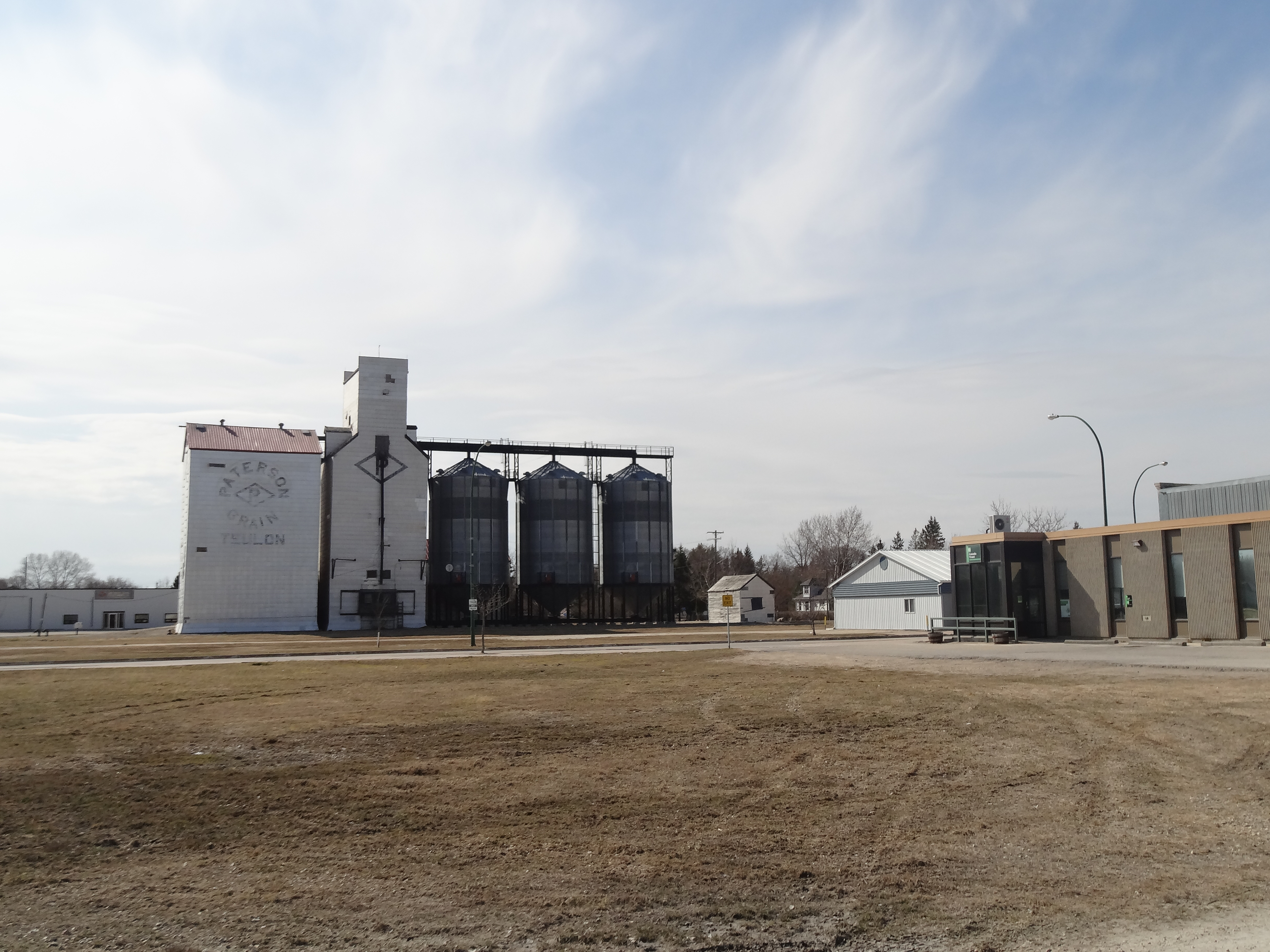

- Town boundaries

- Location within Manitoba
- Coordinates: 50°23′09″N 97°15′40″W
- Country: Canada
- Province: Manitoba
- Region: Winnipeg Capital Region
- Rural municipality: Rockwood
- Established: 1919
- Incorporated (Village): 1919
- Incorporated (Town): 1997

Government
  - Mayor: Todd Campbell

Area
  - Land: 3.23 km^{2} (1.25 sq mi)

Population (2016)
  - Total: 1,201
  - Density: 372.3/km^{2} (964/sq mi)
- Time zone: UTC-6 (CST)
  - Summer (DST): UTC-5 (CDT)
- Postal Code: R0C 3B0
- Area code: 204
- Website: www.teulon.ca

Teulon is a town located approximately 59 kilometres north of Winnipeg, Manitoba, Canada, on Provincial Trunk Highway 7. Located between Stonewall and Gimli, Teulon is commonly referred to as "The Gateway to the Interlake". Teulon is surrounded by the Rural Municipality of Rockwood.

== History ==
Teulon was founded in 1919, as a settlement for immigrant farmers, by Charles C. Castle, and was affectionately named after his wife's maiden name of "Teulon". Teulon soon became a village, and then became a town in 1997.

== Demographics ==
In the 2021 Census of Population conducted by Statistics Canada, Teulon had a population of 1,196 living in 544 of its 588 total private dwellings, a change of −0.4% from its 2016 population of 1,201. With a land area of 3.23 km^{2} (1.25 sq mi), it had a population density of 370.3/km^{2} (959.0/sq mi) in 2021.

== Education ==
Teulon is situated in the South Interlake school division [no.21] and is served by two schools:

- Teulon Elementary School teaches kindergarten to grade 6 students
- Teulon Collegiate Institute teaches grade 7 to grade 12

== Government ==
=== Municipal ===
Teulon is represented by a Head of Council (Mayor), a Deputy Mayor, and 3 councillors. The current incumbents of the positions are:

- Todd Campbell- Mayor
- Robin Nishibata- Deputy Mayor
- Michael Hepples- Councillor
- Kirt Ansell- Councillor
- Glenn Kletke- Councillor

==== Former mayors ====
Name	Term began	Term ended
Bert Campbell		2018

In October 2019 the Teulon Council lost three of its members and faces a by-election in those ridings.

=== Provincial ===
Teulon is located in the Riding of Lakeside of Legislative Assembly of Manitoba and is currently represented by Ralph Eichler of the Progressive Conservative Party of Manitoba.

=== Federal ===
Teulon is located in the Selkirk—Interlake electoral district with one Member of Parliament (MP). The district's current MP is James Bezan (Teulon) of the Conservative Party of Canada.

The Winnipeg-Interlake division of the Senate is represented by Janis Johnson who was appointed by Brian Mulroney, and is a member of the Conservative Party of Canada.

== Attractions ==
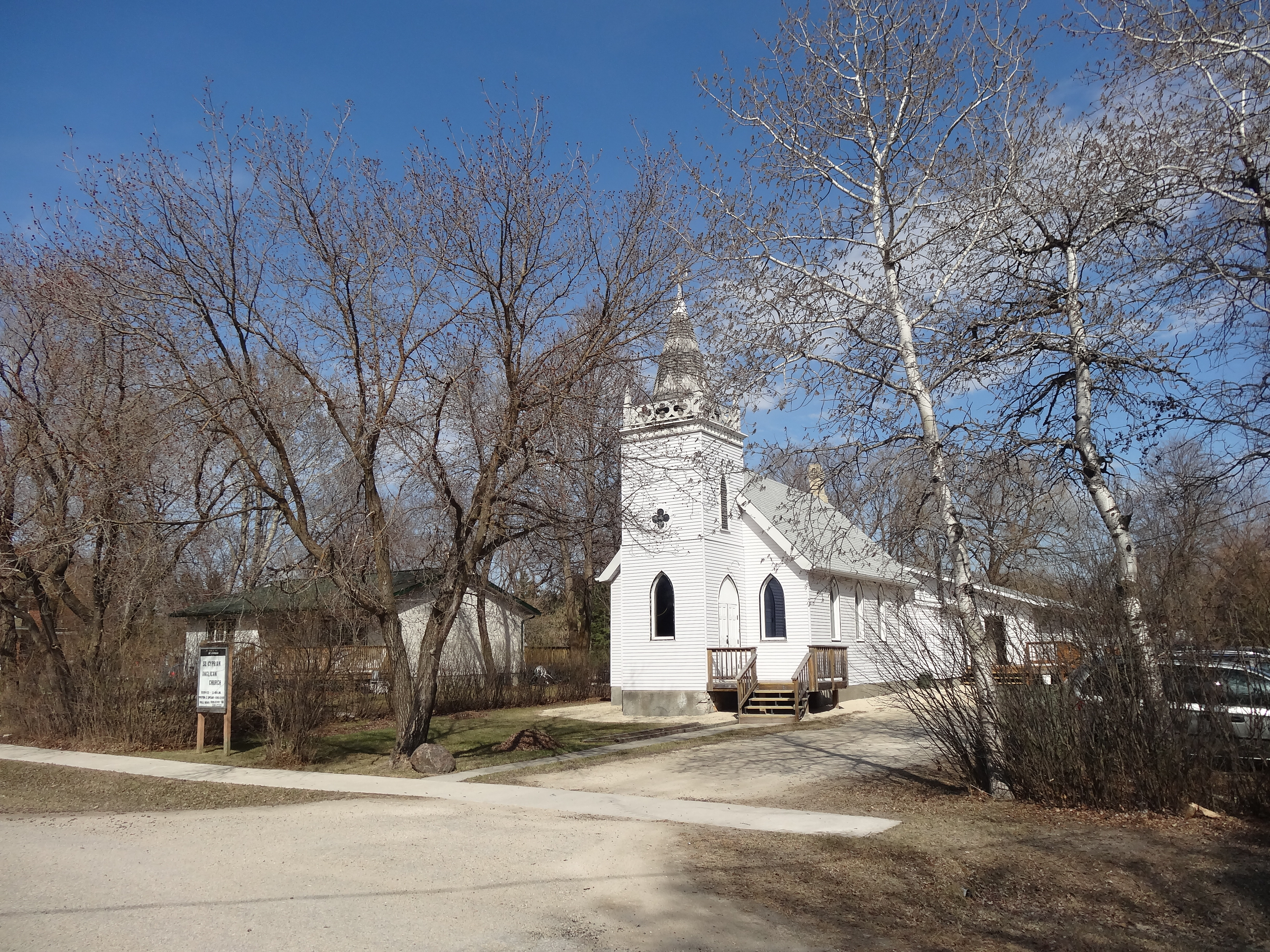
Anglican church in Teulon

=== Features ===
Teulon's features include the Teulon Golf & Country Club, Green Acres Park & Campground, Teulon Curling Club, Teulon Rockwood Arena, Teulon Rockwood Centennial Centre, South Interlake Regional Library, and the Teulon and District Museum.

A two-room motel and the Teulon Motor Hotel & Bar are available for visitors.

=== Summer ===
Teulon has been known for its Truck & Tractor Pull, along with the Demolition Derby, at the rodeo grounds contained within Green Acres Park. The contest brings out competitors from all over the county.

Teulon Rodeo is also held at the end of August every year, featuring a full heartland rodeo schedule, chariot races, and other attractions.

A short drive to Stonewall's "Quarry Days," Winnipeg Beach's "Boardwalk Days," and Gimli's "Icelandic Festival," visitors of Teulon are able to take in many stops of the Manitoba traveling carnival "Wonder Shows", as well as the local version known as "Teulon Dayz".

Also nearby are Kinsmen Lake, Lake Winnipeg, and Norris Lake.

=== Winter ===
Annually, the Town of Teulon holds a Santa Claus parade started by Gloria Joy Anderson, most often followed by a bonspiel. Volunteers create floats, decorating their vehicles and tractors, and toss candy to guests.

== Media ==
=== Radio ===
CJ107.5 FM is The Voice of The Interlake featuring Local News, Weather, and events and plays today's Country, Classic Country, Pop, Classic Rock, Oldies and more.

=== Newspaper ===
Local newspapers of Teulon include the Stonewall Teulon Tribune, the Stonewall Argus & Teulon Times and the Interlake Spectator.

=== In film ===
In 2007, Teulon was the film location for The Haunting in Connecticut starring Virginia Madsen and Elias Koteas. The film premiered on March 27, 2009.
