= Stonewall, Manitoba =

Stonewall
- Town
- Motto: A Great Place to Call Home
- Town boundaries

- Location of Stonewall in Manitoba
- Coordinates: 50°08′04″N 97°19′34″W
- Country: Canada
- Province: Manitoba
- Regions: Interlake; Winnipeg Metro
- Established: 1878
- Incorporated (Village): 1906
- Incorporated (Town): 1908

Government
  - Mayor: Sandra Smith
  - MLA: Trevor King (politician)

Area
  - Total: 5.96 km^{2} (2.30 sq mi)

Population (2021 Census)
  - Total: 5,046
  - Density: 846.64/km^{2} (2,192.8/sq mi)
- Time zone: UTC-6 (CST)
  - Summer (DST): UTC-5 (CDT)
- Postal Code: R0C 2Z0
- Area codes: 204, 431
- Website: www.stonewall.ca

Stonewall is a town in the Canadian province of Manitoba with a population of 5,046 as of the 2021 census. The town is situated approximately 25 kilometres (16 mi) north of Winnipeg on PTH 67. It is known for its limestone quarries. The local festival is the Quarry Days which is usually held over three days in August on Main Street. The town is surrounded by the R.M. of Rockwood.

== History ==
When the last ice age retreated, as well as the prairies, escarpments such as Riding Mountain were left behind. In addition to these, smaller elevations were left behind such as Stony Mountain and Stonewall. It is believed that these escarpments were used as look-outs by early hunters approximately 4,000 to 5,000 years ago. These formations were later used as buffalo jumps by the indigenous populations.

Stonewall was founded by Samuel Jacob Jackson in 1878, after he acquired the land the town is built upon in 1875. However, Jackson did not move to Stonewall himself until 1881.

In the early 1880s, the quarry opened with the focus of their operation being the production of quicklime. During the peak times of the quarry, large amounts of dynamite was used for blasting the rock. The dynamite was kept in the powder magazine which has since been rebuilt near the entrance to Stonewall Quarry Park.

On June 30, 1880, the CPR railway line between Winnipeg and Victoria Junction, 3 miles (4.8 km) east of Stonewall, was completed. The construction of the line continued west passing through Stonewall, Hanlan and Meadow Lea before turning south-west towards Portage la Prairie during the summer of 1880. The transcontinental line was originally planned to pass through Selkirk, but was actually built through Winnipeg following heavy lobbying from the city. The line west of Stonewall was therefore rebuilt through Rosser. The line north-west from Stonewall was subsequently extended through Teulon, Komarno before eventually reaching Arborg in 1910. In 2008, the RM of Rockwood decided that the line was obsolete. With the city of Winnipeg's help the line was taken out.

The present town hall was built in 1912 using local limestone.

Following the closure of the quarry, Kinsmen Lake was developed on the site and opened to the public on August 10, 1956. The lake has become a popular location for locals and visitors to the town. In 1983, the town council initiated a project to develop the former quarry site around Kinsmen Lake into a historical site and natural area.

As of 2022, one of the three famous kilns in Stonewall Quarry Park were demolished due to safety reasons. Stonewall Town Council contributed $1,000,000 for the restoration.

== Demographics ==
Historical population
Year	Pop.	±%
1901	589	—
1911	1,005	+70.6%
1921	1,112	+10.6%
1931	1,031	−7.3%
1941	1,020	−1.1%
1951	1,040	+2.0%
1961	1,420	+36.5%
1996	3,689	+159.8%
2001	4,012	+8.8%
2006	4,376	+9.1%
2011	4,536	+3.7%
2016	4,809	+6.0%
2021	5,046	+4.9%

In the 2021 Census of Population conducted by Statistics Canada, Stonewall had a population of 5,046 living in 2,051 of its 2,127 total private dwellings, a change of 4.9% from its 2016 population of 4,809. With a land area of 5.96 km^{2} (2.30 sq mi), it had a population density of 846.6/km^{2} (2,192.8/sq mi) in 2021.

Panethnic groups in the Town of Stonewall (2001−2021)
Panethnic group	2021		2016		2011		2006		2001	
Panethnic group	Pop.	%	Pop.	%	Pop.	%	Pop.	%	Pop.	%
European (Note: Statistic includes all persons that did not make up part of a visible minority or an indigenous identity.)	4,085	81.78%	3,900	85.06%	3,825	85.57%	3,905	90.6%	3,640	92.15%
Indigenous	825	16.52%	630	13.74%	580	12.98%	380	8.82%	295	7.47%
South Asian	30	0.6%	0	0%	0	0%	10	0.23%	0	0%
Southeast Asian (Note: Statistic includes total responses of "Filipino" and "Southeast Asian" under visible minority section on census.)	25	0.5%	25	0.55%	0	0%	0	0%	0	0%
African	20	0.4%	10	0.22%	0	0%	10	0.23%	0	0%
East Asian (Note: Statistic includes total responses of "Chinese", "Korean", and "Japanese" under visible minority section on census.)	0	0%	0	0%	40	0.89%	0	0%	10	0.25%
Latin American	0	0%	0	0%	0	0%	0	0%	10	0.25%
Middle Eastern (Note: Statistic includes total responses of "West Asian" and "Arab" under visible minority section on census.)	0	0%	0	0%	0	0%	0	0%	0	0%
Other/multiracial (Note: Statistic includes total responses of "Visible minority, n.i.e." and "Multiple visible minorities" under visible minority section on census.)	0	0%	20	0.44%	20	0.45%	0	0%	0	0%
Total responses	4,995	98.99%	4,585	95.34%	4,470	98.54%	4,310	98.49%	3,950	98.45%
Total population	5,046	100%	4,809	100%	4,536	100%	4,376	100%	4,012	100%
Note: Totals greater than 100% due to multiple origin responses

== Education ==
Stonewall is situated in the Interlake school division and is served by four schools:

- École R. W. Bobby Bend School offers a dual-track (French Immersion and English) kindergarten to grade 4 students;
- École Stonewall Centennial School offers a dual-track program for grade 5 to 8 students;
- Collège Stonewall Collegiate offers classes for grades 9-12; and
- OneSchool Global offers classes for grades 3-12.

== Government ==
=== Municipal ===
Stonewall is represented by a Head of Council (Mayor), a Deputy Mayor and three councilors. The current incumbents of the positions are:

- Mayor: Sandra Smith
- Deputy Mayor: Peter Bullivant
- Council: Walter Badger, Ron Maryniuk, Kimberly Newman

=== Provincial ===
Stonewall is located in the Riding of Lakeside of Legislative Assembly of Manitoba and is currently represented by Trevor King of the Progressive Conservative Party of Manitoba.

=== Federal ===
Stonewall is located in the Selkirk—Interlake electoral district which returns one Member of Parliament who currently is James Bezan of the Conservative Party of Canada.

The Winnipeg-Interlake division of the Senate is represented by Janis Johnson who was appointed by Brian Mulroney and who is a member of the Conservative Party of Canada.

== Climate ==
Stonewall experiences a humid continental climate (Köppen Dfb) with warm to hot summers and cold winters

Climate data for Stonewall
Month	Jan	Feb	Mar	Apr	May	Jun	Jul	Aug	Sep	Oct	Nov	Dec	Year
Record high °C (°F)	6 (43)	6.7 (44.1)	18.3 (64.9)	35.5 (95.9)	38.5 (101.3)	37.2 (99.0)	37.8 (100.0)	38.5 (101.3)	39 (102)	28.9 (84.0)	24.4 (75.9)	8.9 (48.0)	39 (102)
Mean daily maximum °C (°F)	−13.1 (8.4)	−9 (16)	−1.6 (29.1)	10.3 (50.5)	19.7 (67.5)	23.6 (74.5)	26 (79)	24.9 (76.8)	18.7 (65.7)	10.8 (51.4)	−0.9 (30.4)	−10.3 (13.5)	8.3 (46.9)
Daily mean °C (°F)	−18.4 (−1.1)	−14.4 (6.1)	−6.8 (19.8)	4.1 (39.4)	12.5 (54.5)	16.9 (62.4)	19.3 (66.7)	18.1 (64.6)	12.3 (54.1)	5.2 (41.4)	−5.2 (22.6)	−15.3 (4.5)	2.4 (36.3)
Mean daily minimum °C (°F)	−23.5 (−10.3)	−19.9 (−3.8)	−12 (10)	−2.2 (28.0)	5.2 (41.4)	10.3 (50.5)	12.6 (54.7)	11.2 (52.2)	5.9 (42.6)	−0.4 (31.3)	−9.5 (14.9)	−20.4 (−4.7)	−3.6 (25.5)
Record low °C (°F)	−41.7 (−43.1)	−42.8 (−45.0)	−41.1 (−42.0)	−26.3 (−15.3)	−13.3 (8.1)	−2.5 (27.5)	2.2 (36.0)	−2.8 (27.0)	−7.8 (18.0)	−20 (−4)	−37.5 (−35.5)	−38 (−36)	−42.8 (−45.0)
Average precipitation mm (inches)	24 (0.9)	17.6 (0.69)	24.3 (0.96)	32 (1.3)	55.3 (2.18)	93.7 (3.69)	67.9 (2.67)	64.8 (2.55)	55.1 (2.17)	41.7 (1.64)	24.2 (0.95)	18.9 (0.74)	519.6 (20.46)
Source: Environment Canada

== Sports ==
Stonewall is home to the Stonewall Jets of the MMJHL and the Stonewall Rams of the WHSHL.

Stonewall has a senior baseball team named the Stonewall Blue Jays and a football club named the Interlake Thunder.

Stonewall has two Hockey rinks: the Stonewall Arena (Ice Palace) and the Veterans Memorial Sports Complex. The only curling rink is the Sunova Credit Union Curling Rink.

Stonewall has one Soccer field: The Cooke Soccer Field.

== Attractions ==
=== Stonewall Quarry Park ===
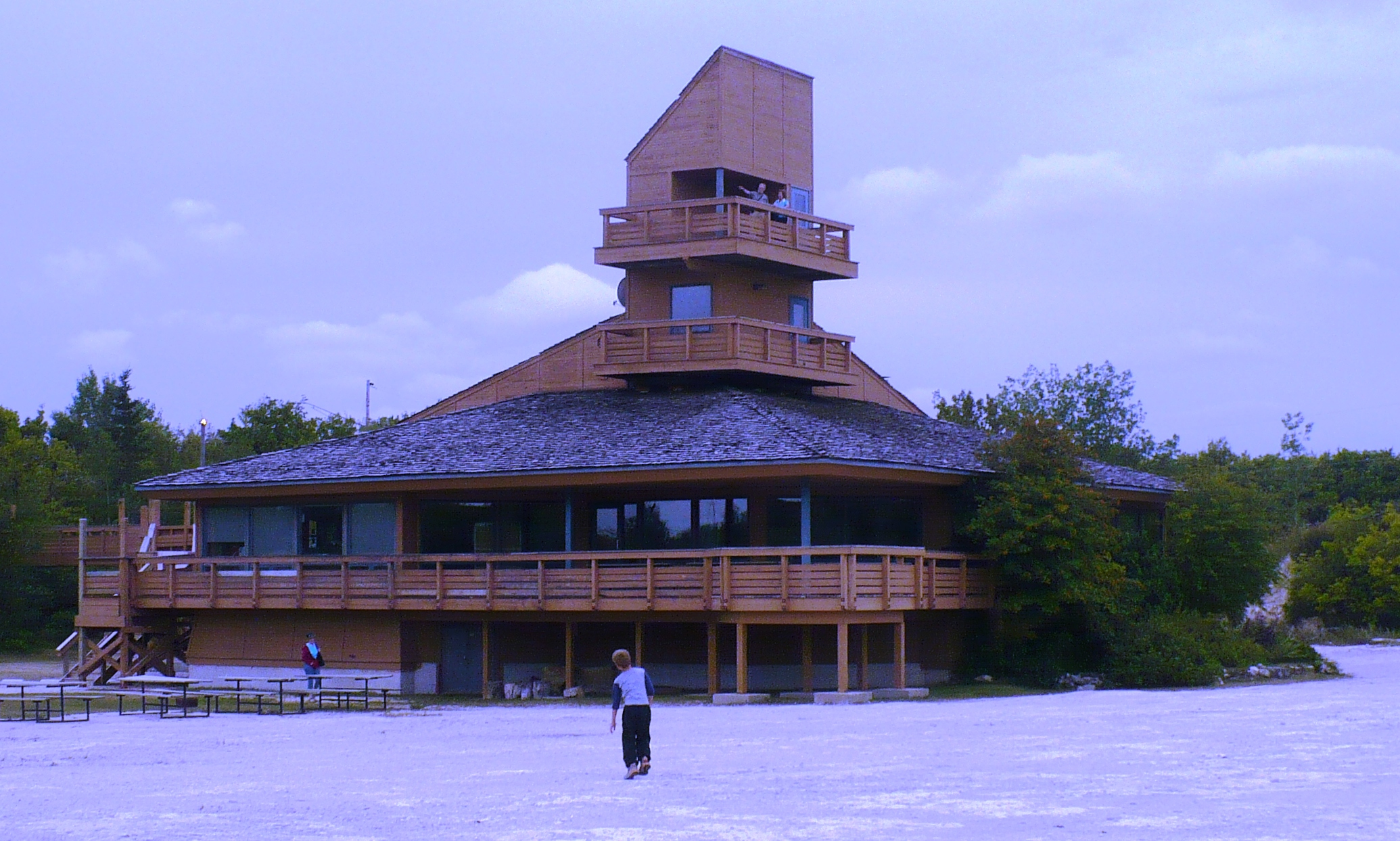
Old Quarry Park Interpretive Centre (as seen 3 months before it burned down). A new one was opened on the fourth anniversary of the fire

The Stonewall Quarry Park has been maintained as a natural area on the edge of town. It provides picnic facilities, as well as walking and biking trails, for visitors and residents alike. The nine baseball diamonds are available for hire and have been used for the Blue Jays Cups in 1997 and 1998, the Pan Am Games in 1999 and the Western Canada Summer Games in 2003. There is also a campsite and swimming available in Kinsmen Lake. The Kinsmen Lake Splash Pad was opened in 2021 to the public. Stonewall Quarry Park also displays the many aspects of limestone production, one aspect includes The Kilns which were used for producing calcium oxide and quicklime in the late 1800's to mid 1900's. There was a museum and visitor centre, however these were destroyed by fire in the early hours of November 11, 2007. The new interpretive centre was opened in fall 2011.

=== Oak Hammock Marsh Interpretive Centre ===
Oak Hammock Marsh Interpretive Centre is a 36 km^{2} (14 sq mi) restored prairie marsh featuring artesian springs, aspen-oak bluff, waterfowl lure crop, tall-grass prairie and 30 kilometres (19 mi) of trails. The marsh is home to mammals, birds, amphibians, reptiles, fish and invertebrates. During the migration season, the number of waterfowl using the marsh can exceed 400,000 a day.

=== The Stonewall Post Office ===
The Stonewall Post Office is an example of the prairie style of architecture which was popular between late 19th and early 20th century. It was built in 1914 using local limestone and used as a post office until 1979. The Canadian Postmasters and Assistants Association was founded at the previous Stonewall post office in 1902.

== Notable people ==
- Alan Arnett McLeod – Stonewall-born recipient of the Victoria Cross for actions performed in the skies above the town of Albert, France during the First World War
- William Kurelek – painter, Member of the Order of Canada, raised on a farm near Stonewall
- Holly Letkeman – professional wrestler signed to Impact! Wrestling under the ring-name Rosemary
- Joey Dandeneau – drummer in Canadian rock band Theory of a Deadman
- Leonard Woods – sculptor

== See also ==
- List of towns in Manitoba
- List of communities in Manitoba by population
