= Warren, Manitoba =

Warren
- Unincorporated Community
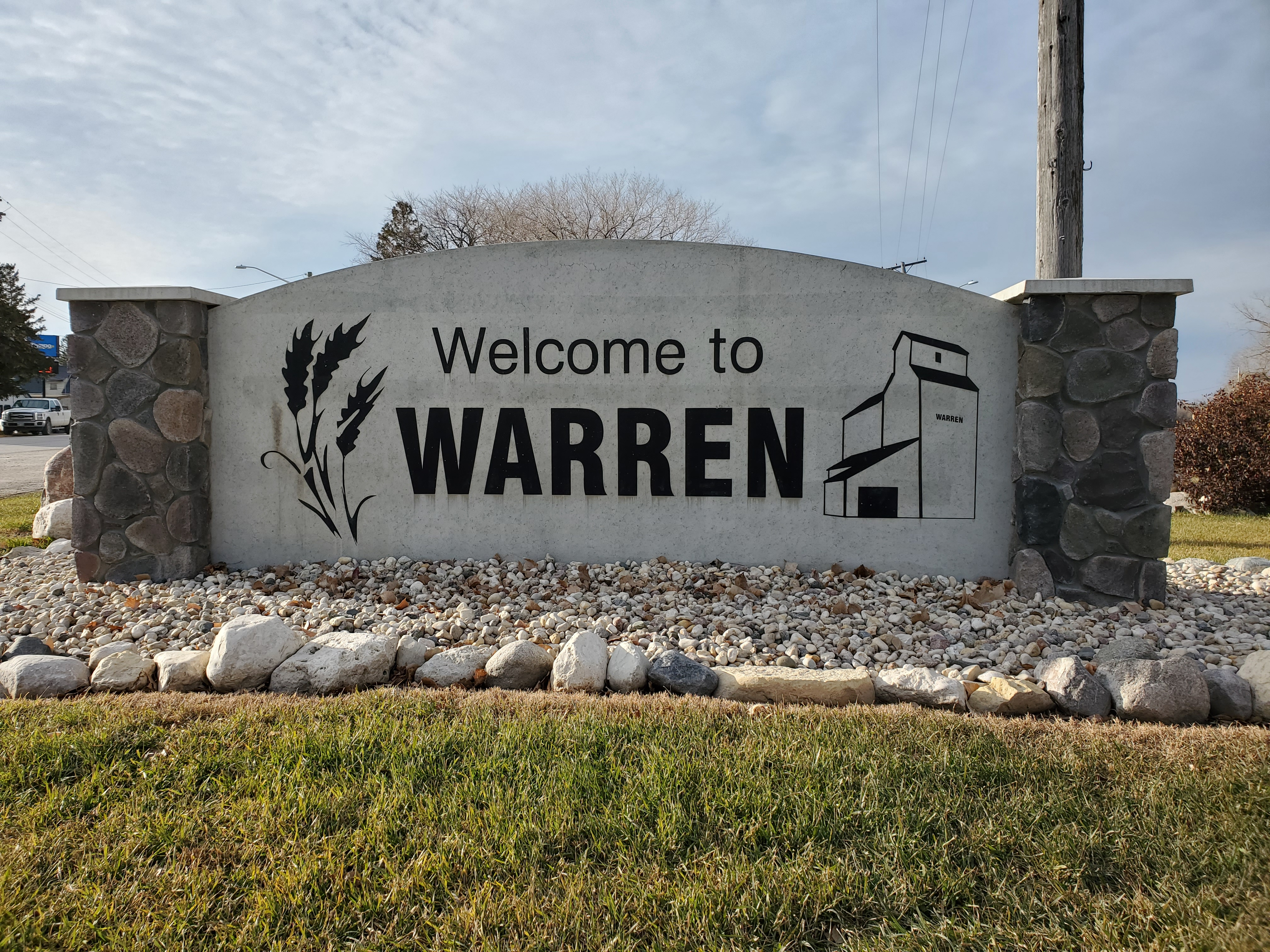
- 'Welcome to Warren' sign

- Location within Manitoba
- Coordinates: 50°07′54″N 97°32′48″W
- Country: Canada
- Province: Manitoba
- Established: 1882

Government
  - Reeve of RM of Woodlands: Lori Schellekens
  - MLA (Lakeside): Trevor King
  - MP (Selkirk—Interlake—Eastman): James Bezan

Area
  - Total: 5.38 km^{2} (2.08 sq mi)
- Elevation: 248 m (814 ft)

Population (2016)
  - Total: 818
  - Density: 152/km^{2} (394/sq mi)

Warren is an unincorporated community recognized as a local urban district 26.3 kilometres (16.3 miles) north-west of Winnipeg, Manitoba. It is located in the Rural Municipality of Woodlands.

The post office opened in 1882 as Hanlan and was renamed to Warrenton in 1912. The community and Canadian National Railway point were named Warren after railway developer Albert Edward Warren (A.E. Warren), while the post office remained Warrenton. Warrenton was rescinded in 1955 and Geographic Board of Canada correspondence in 1905 indicated that the post office and township were named Hanlan after Edward "Ned" Hanlan, "champion oarsman of the world" from 1880 to 1884. Warren was named by the CNR in 1905, after A.E. Warren, Western Vice President of the CNR.

A 40,000-bushel wooden grain elevator was built here in 1948 by Manitoba Pool Elevator. An attached crib annex was added in 1958, more than doubling its capacity. It was shut down in 2000, but was acquired by the municipality and the site is now used for community events.

Today, Warren is home to several organizations, tourist venues, services, an elementary school and a high school.

== Demographics ==
In the 2021 Census of Population conducted by Statistics Canada, Warren had a population of 1,015 living in 329 of its 341 total private dwellings, a change of 24.1% from its 2016 population of 818. With a land area of 5.39 km^{2} (2.08 sq mi), it had a population density of 188.3/km^{2} (487.7/sq mi) in 2021.
