= Balmoral, Manitoba =

- Unincorporated Village
- Location of Balmoral in Manitoba
- Coordinates: 50°15′24″N 97°19′16″W
- Country: Canada
- Province: Manitoba
- Region: Winnipeg Capital Region
- Rural Municipality: Rockwood
- Elevation: 254 m (833 ft)
- Time zone: UTC-6 (CST)
  - Summer (DST): UTC-5 (CDT)
- Postal Code: R0C 0H0
- Area code: 204
- Website: https://www.balmoralmb.com/

Balmoral is an unincorporated village north of Winnipeg located within the boundaries of the Rural Municipality of Rockwood, Manitoba.

The Post Office opened in 1879 to service the early settlers who began arriving in the area in 1874. There was also a Canadian Pacific railway point on 6-15-2E. The community was named after Balmoral Castle in Scotland. A School District was located on SW7-15-2E. The community was originally known as Quickfall.

== See also ==
- List of communities in Manitoba
