= Rural Municipality of Rosser =

Rural municipality in Manitoba, Canada

Rosser
- Rural municipality
- Rural Municipality of Rosser
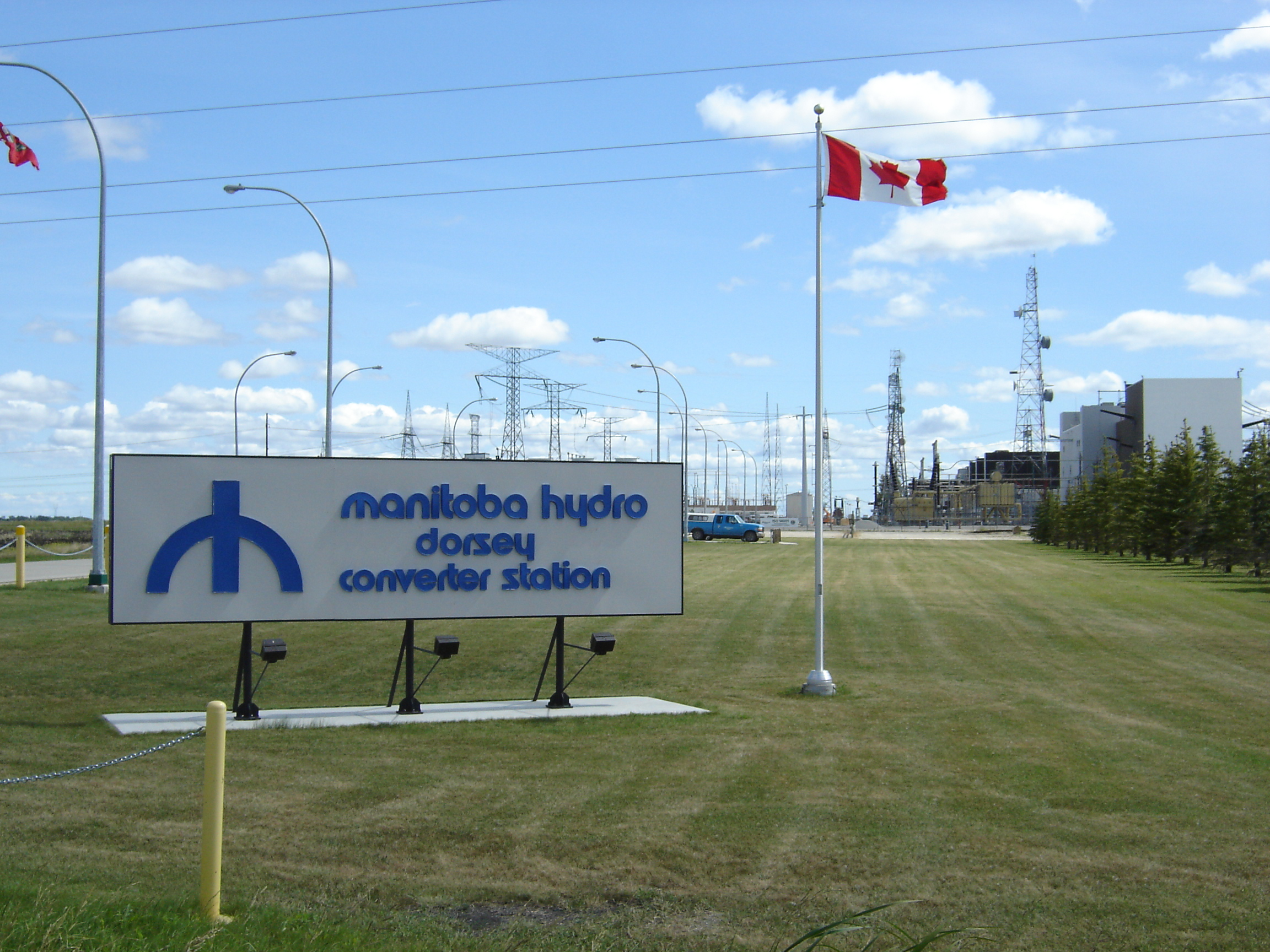
- Dorsey Converter Station near Rosser, Manitoba, August 2005

- Location of the RM of Rosser in Manitoba
- Coordinates: 49°59′24″N 97°27′33″W
- Country: Canada
- Province: Manitoba
- Region: Winnipeg Metro
- Incorporated: 1893; 133 years ago
- Seat: Rosser, Manitoba

Government
  - Reeve: Angela Emms
  - MLA: Trevor King (Lakeside)
  - MP: Doug Eyolfson (Winnipeg West)

Area
  - Rural municipality: 441.56 km^{2} (170.49 sq mi)
  - Metro: 5,306.79 km^{2} (2,048.96 sq mi)
- Elevation: 241 m (791 ft)

Population (2016)
  - Rural municipality: 1,372
  - Density: 3.107/km^{2} (8.048/sq mi)
  - Metro: 778,489
- Time zone: UTC−6 (CST)
  - Summer (DST): UTC−5 (CDT)
- Postal Code: R0H 1E0
- Area codes: 204, 431
- Website: rmofrosser.com

Rosser is a rural municipality (RM) in the Canadian province of Manitoba, lying adjacent to the northwest side of Winnipeg and part of the Winnipeg Metro Region. Its population as of the 2016 Census was 1,372.

It is situated along Provincial Trunk Highway 6, and Winnipeg's Perimeter Highway. CentrePort Canada lies primarily in the eastern part of the RM, inside the Perimeter Highway. A small portion of Winnipeg James Armstrong Richardson International Airport also lies within the RM of Rosser.

Water services are provided by the Cartier Regional Water Cooperative. The CentrePort distribution line serves CentrePort development and the RM of Rosser. Water sourced from the Assiniboine River is treated at Headingley before being sent out through distribution channels. Near the community of Rosser is the Dorsey Converter Station and the large static inverter plant for the Nelson River Bipole HVDC power transmission project.

== Communities ==
The following communities lie within the RM:

- Gordon
- Grosse Isle
- Lilyfield
- Marquette
- Meadows
- Rosser

== Demographics ==
In the 2021 Census of Population conducted by Statistics Canada, Rosser had a population of 1,270 living in 424 of its 448 total private dwellings, a change of −7.4% from its 2016 population of 1,372. With a land area of 441.74 km^{2} (170.56 sq mi), it had a population density of 2.9/km^{2} (7.4/sq mi) in 2021.

As of 2004, a handful of elderly Old Swedish (gammalsvenska) speakers remain. They are the descendants of ethnically Swedish people who moved to Manitoba from Gammalsvenskby, Ukraine, in the early 1900s. Old Swedish derives from the Estonian Swedish dialect of the late 1700s as spoken on the island of Dagö (Hiiumaa). While rooted in Swedish, the dialect shows influence and borrowings from Estonian, German, Russian, and Ukrainian.

== Attractions ==
- CentrePort Canada — lies primarily in the eastern part of the RM of Rosser
- Little Mountain Park
- Prairie Dog Central Railway — travels through the RM of Rosser
- Six Pines Ranch — agritourism farm
- Winnipeg James Armstrong Richardson International Airport — partially lies within the RM of Rosser.
- Rosser Community Friendship Park — two walking trails (2.06 km and 1.31 km), picnic tables
