= Stony Mountain, Manitoba =

- Unincorporated Community (Village)
- Location of Stony Mountain in Manitoba
- Coordinates: 50°05′18″N 97°13′10″W
- Country: Canada
- Province: Manitoba
- Region: Winnipeg Capital Region
- Rural Municipality: Rockwood

Area
  - Total: 1.82 km^{2} (0.70 sq mi)
- Elevation: 248 m (814 ft)

Population (2016)
  - Total: 1,800
- Time zone: UTC-6 (CST)
  - Summer (DST): UTC-5 (CDT)
- Postal Code: R0C 3A0
- Area code: 204

Stony Mountain is a small community in Manitoba, Canada approximately 11 kilometres (6.8 mi) north of Winnipeg on Provincial Highway 7. The town is in the Rural Municipality of Rockwood and is the location of Stony Mountain Ski Area. The Stony Mountain Institution and Rockwood Institution prisons are in Stony Mountain.

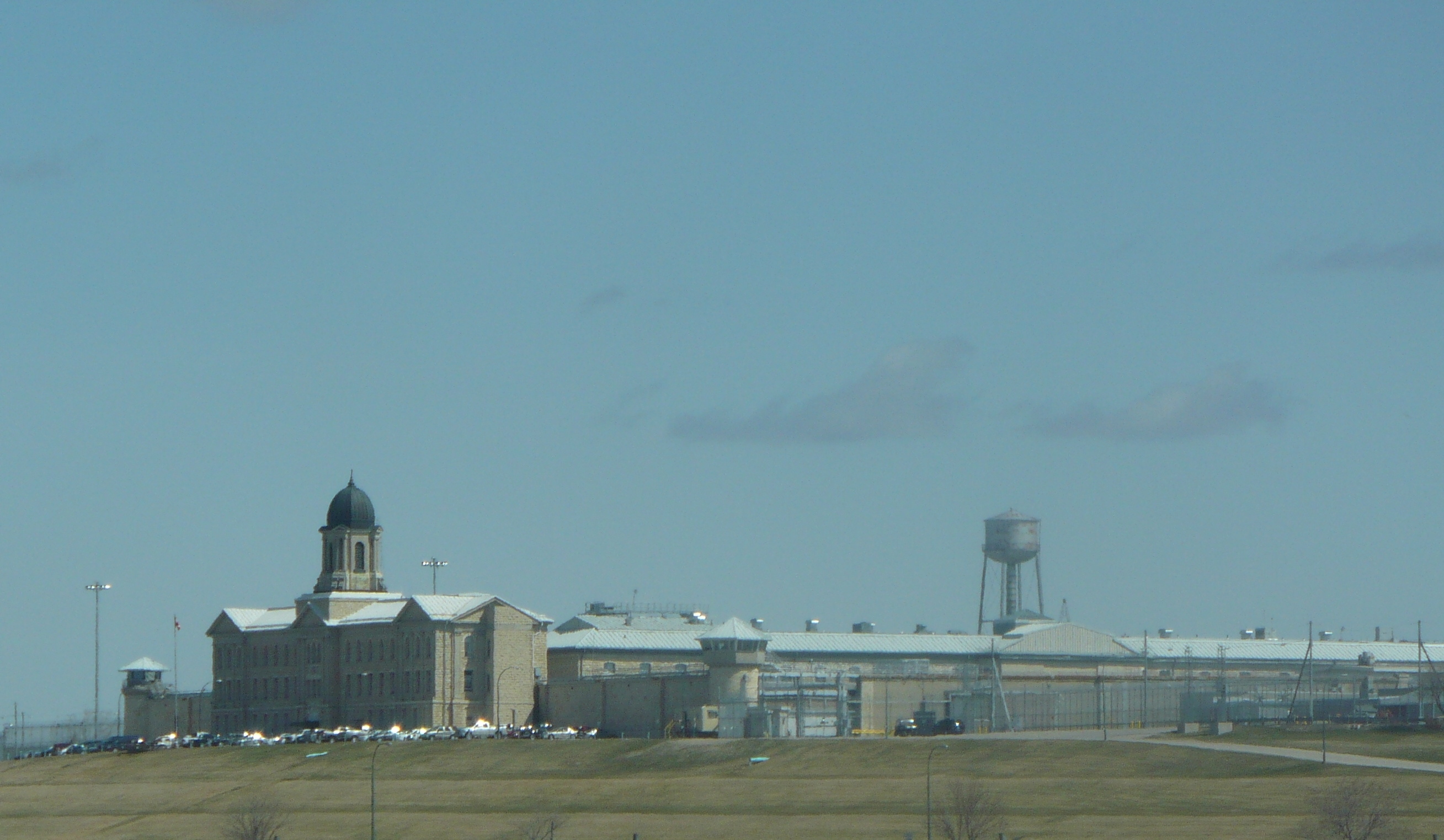
Stony Mountain Institution

It is the birthplace of hockey hall of famer Babe Pratt.

== Demographics ==
In the 2021 Census of Population conducted by Statistics Canada, Stony Mountain had a population of 1,979 living in 438 of its 455 total private dwellings, a change of 21% from its 2016 population of 1,636. With a land area of 2.67 km^{2} (1.03 sq mi), it had a population density of 741.2/km^{2} (1,919.7/sq mi) in 2021.

== Water ==
The RM owns and operates the Stony Mountain Water and Wastewater Utility serving 678 customers, including one trailer park with 26 trailers, one school, one hotel, 16 businesses and four industrial connections. At the time that this application was submitted to the Board, all but seven customers were metered. Water services to Stony Mountain Institution are provided by the Cartier Regional Water Co-Op.

== Climate ==
Climate data for Stony Mountain
Month	Jan	Feb	Mar	Apr	May	Jun	Jul	Aug	Sep	Oct	Nov	Dec	Year
Record high °C (°F)	7 (45)	7 (45)	17 (63)	34 (93)	38 (100)	37.5 (99.5)	36.1 (97.0)	38.5 (101.3)	38.5 (101.3)	30 (86)	23.4 (74.1)	9 (48)	38.5 (101.3)
Mean daily maximum °C (°F)	−12.8 (9.0)	−8.5 (16.7)	−1.2 (29.8)	9.8 (49.6)	19.1 (66.4)	23.3 (73.9)	25.9 (78.6)	25 (77)	18.4 (65.1)	10.5 (50.9)	−1.1 (30.0)	−9.8 (14.4)	8.2 (46.8)
Daily mean °C (°F)	−18 (0)	−13.8 (7.2)	−6.3 (20.7)	3.8 (38.8)	12.1 (53.8)	16.9 (62.4)	19.5 (67.1)	18.4 (65.1)	12.3 (54.1)	5.1 (41.2)	−5.3 (22.5)	−14.7 (5.5)	2.5 (36.5)
Mean daily minimum °C (°F)	−23.2 (−9.8)	−19 (−2)	−11.3 (11.7)	−2.2 (28.0)	5.1 (41.2)	10.5 (50.9)	13.1 (55.6)	11.8 (53.2)	9.2 (48.6)	−0.4 (31.3)	−9.5 (14.9)	−19.5 (−3.1)	−3.2 (26.2)
Record low °C (°F)	−42.2 (−44.0)	−42.5 (−44.5)	−36.7 (−34.1)	−27.2 (−17.0)	−9 (16)	−2 (28)	2.2 (36.0)	0.6 (33.1)	−6.5 (20.3)	−20 (−4)	−39 (−38)	−39 (−38)	−42.5 (−44.5)
Average precipitation mm (inches)	22 (0.9)	15.8 (0.62)	20.7 (0.81)	26.5 (1.04)	54.8 (2.16)	88.9 (3.50)	71.5 (2.81)	68.6 (2.70)	53.1 (2.09)	39 (1.5)	27.1 (1.07)	22.6 (0.89)	510.4 (20.09)
Source: Environment Canada

== See also ==
- List of communities in Manitoba
