= Rural Municipality of Rockwood =

Rural Municipality in Manitoba, Canada

Rockwood
- Rural Municipality
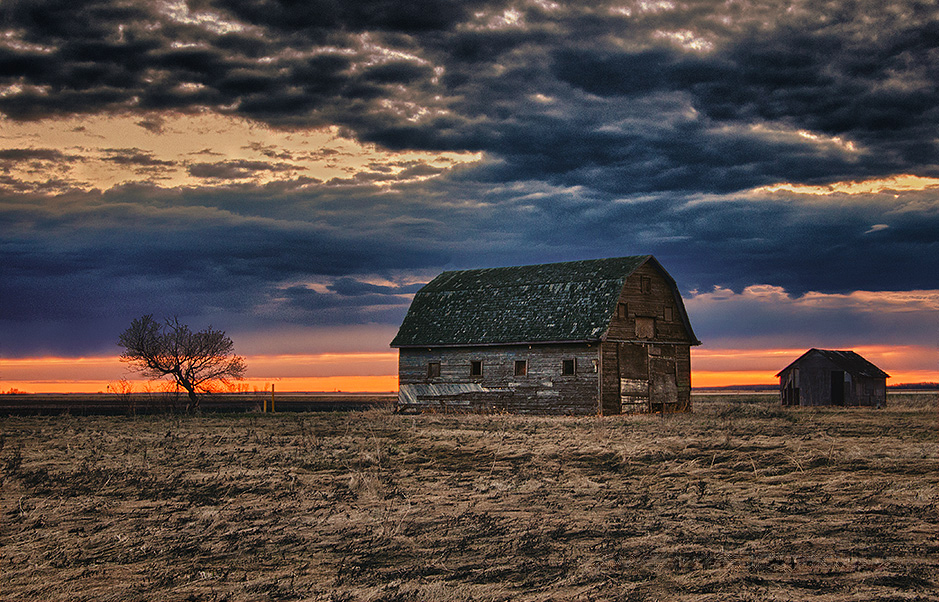
- Rural scene in Rockwood

- Location of the RM of Rockwood in Manitoba
- Coordinates: 50°17′08″N 97°17′13″W
- Country: Canada
- Province: Manitoba
- Region: Winnipeg Metro

Government
  - Reeve: Wes Taplin

Area
  - Total: 1,199.93 km^{2} (463.30 sq mi)
- Elevation: 255 m (837 ft)

Population (2021)
  - Total: 8,440
  - Density: 7.03/km^{2} (18.2/sq mi)
- Time zone: UTC−6 (CST)
  - Summer (DST): UTC−5 (CDT)
- Postal Code: R0C
- Area codes: 204, 431
- Website: https://rockwood.ca/

Rockwood is a rural municipality (RM) lying north of Winnipeg, Manitoba, Canada. It is part of the Winnipeg Metro Region and had a 2021 census population of 8,440. The independently governed towns of Stonewall and Teulon are both enclaved within Rockwood.

== Communities ==
- Argyle
- Balmoral
- Grosse Isle (part)
- Gunton
- Komarno
- Stony Mountain

== Demographics ==
Historical population
Year	Pop.	±%
1891	2,901	—
1981	6,321	+117.9%
1986	6,923	+9.5%
1996	7,504	+8.4%
2001	7,654	+2.0%
2006	7,692	+0.5%
2011	7,964	+3.5%
2016	7,823	−1.8%
2021	8,440	+7.9%
Sources: Department of Agriculture

In the 2021 Census of Population conducted by Statistics Canada, Rockwood had a population of 8,440 living in 2,747 of its 2,927 total private dwellings, a change of 7.9% from its 2016 population of 7,823. With a land area of 1,184.89 km^{2} (457.49 sq mi), it had a population density of 7.1/km^{2} (18.4/sq mi) in 2021.

Panethnic groups in the Rural Municipality of Rockwood (2001−2021)
Panethnic group	2021		2016		2011		2006		2001	
Panethnic group	Pop.	%	Pop.	%	Pop.	%	Pop.	%	Pop.	%
European (Note: Statistic includes all persons that did not make up part of a visible minority or an indigenous identity.)	5,875	82.4%	5,900	85.2%	6,300	89.94%	6,500	92.53%	6,425	91.07%
Indigenous	1,110	15.57%	930	13.43%	545	7.78%	500	7.12%	465	6.59%
Southeast Asian (Note: Statistic includes total responses of "Filipino" and "Southeast Asian" under visible minority section on census.)	45	0.63%	20	0.29%	0	0%	10	0.14%	10	0.14%
East Asian (Note: Statistic includes total responses of "Chinese", "Korean", and "Japanese" under visible minority section on census.)	35	0.49%	25	0.36%	0	0%	15	0.21%	25	0.35%
Middle Eastern (Note: Statistic includes total responses of "West Asian" and "Arab" under visible minority section on census.)	10	0.14%	15	0.22%	0	0%	0	0%	0	0%
South Asian	0	0%	10	0.14%	130	1.86%	0	0%	0	0%
Latin American	0	0%	25	0.36%	0	0%	10	0.14%	0	0%
African	0	0%	15	0.22%	15	0.21%	0	0%	125	1.77%
Other/multiracial (Note: Statistic includes total responses of "Visible minority, n.i.e." and "Multiple visible minorities" under visible minority section on census.)	0	0%	0	0%	0	0%	0	0%	15	0.21%
Total responses	7,130	84.48%	6,925	88.52%	7,005	87.96%	7,025	91.33%	7,055	92.17%
Total population	8,440	100%	7,823	100%	7,964	100%	7,692	100%	7,654	100%
Note: Totals greater than 100% due to multiple origin responses

== Water ==
The RM of Rockwood's water is supplied by three wells in operation since 1990.

When the RM applied to the Public Utilities Board for water rate increases in the late 2010s, they reported a higher amount of "unaccounted for" water usage of 17% (normal is 10%). Some of this unused water came from water line cleaning, firefighting, and water main breakage. In 2017, 545 new water meters were installed to help reduce the unaccounted for water.

The Stony Mountain Institution water is provided by the separate Cartier Regional Water Co-op.

== Notable people ==
Athletes

- Moylan McDonnell — ice hockey player, born in Stony Mountain.
- William Meronek — ice hockey player, born in Stony Mountain.
- Bryan Lefley — ice hockey player, born in Grosse Isle.
- Babe Pratt — hockey hall of famer, born in Stony Mountain.

Political and religious figures

- Stanley Fox — first leader of the Manitoba Social Credit Party, born in Balmoral.
- Isidore Goresky — Ukrainian-born Alberta politician who initially settled in Stony Mountain.
- Maurice John Willis — Saskatchewan politician and educator, born in Stony Mountain.
- Dale McFee — Alberta politician and former police chief, raised in Grosse Isle.
- Michael Wiwchar — Catholic bishop, born in Komarno

Law enforcement and military

- Samuel Lawrence Bedson — British-born military man who served as the first warden of the Stony Mountain Penitentiary.
- Acheson Goulding — World War I flying ace, born in Stony Mountain.
- Acheson Irvine — Commissioner of the North-West Mounted Police, who served as warden of the Stony Mountain Penitentiary after his retirement.
