= Winnipeg Metropolitan Region =

Coordinates: 49.88°N 97.13°W

- Metropolitan area
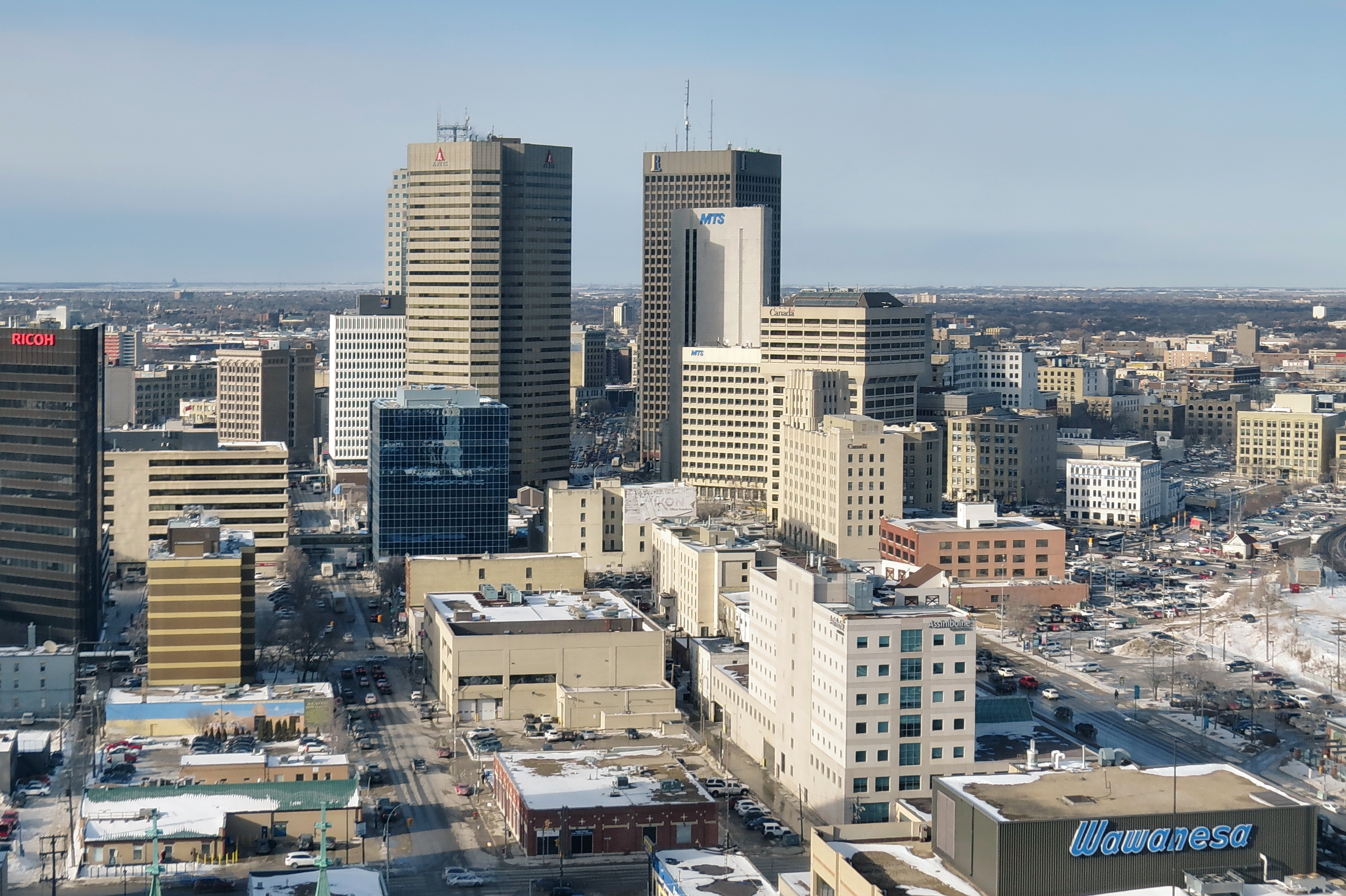

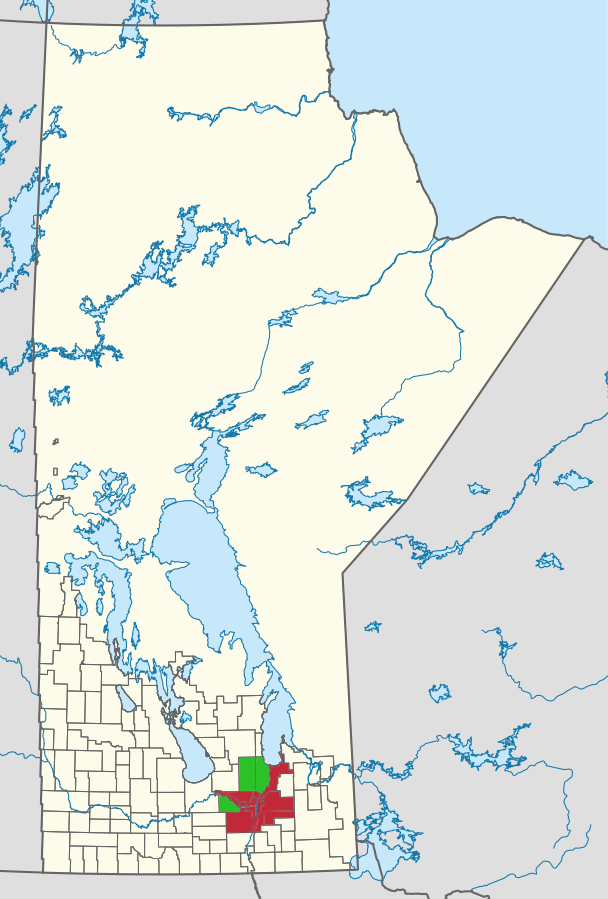
- Red areas are part of the Statistics Canada CMA while green areas show other regions included in the wider WMR.
- Country: Canada
- Province: Manitoba
- Established: 1998; 28 years ago

Government
  - Body: Board
  - Co-chairs: Scott Gillingham Shelley Hart

Area
  - Total: 7,795.96 km^{2} (3,010.04 sq mi)

Population (2021)
  - Total: 834,678
  - Extended area: 39,202
  - Extended area density: 157.9/km^{2} (409/sq mi)
  - Combined: 873,880

GDP
  - Winnipeg CMA: CDN$52 billion
- Time zone: UTC-6 (CST)
  - Summer (DST): UTC-5 (CDT)
- Area codes: 204, 431
- Website: winnipegmetroregion.ca

The Winnipeg Metropolitan Region (formerly called the Winnipeg Capital Region and the Manitoba Capital Region) is a metropolitan area in the Canadian province of Manitoba located in the Red River Valley in the southeast portion of the province of Manitoba, Canada. It contains the provincial capital of Winnipeg and 17 surrounding rural municipalities, cities, and towns.

Other places in the region besides Winnipeg with a population over 1,000 are the city of Selkirk; towns of Stonewall and Niverville; and communities of Oakbank, Oak Bluff, Stony Mountain, Teulon, and Lorette. As the most densely-populated and economically-important area of Manitoba, the region accounts for two-thirds of the province's population and 70% of the provincial GDP as of 2021.

It also includes the smaller census metropolitan area (CMA) of Winnipeg, with the addition of the Brokenhead Ojibway Reserve.

== History ==
In the late 1990s, issues such as providing Shoal Lake water to nearby municipalities and allowing exurban housing growth beyond Winnipeg became more important. At the time, Mayor Susan Thompson voiced the idea of a regional planning authority to mediate such issues.

In June 1998, former Great West Life President Kevin Kavanagh was appointed by Premier Gary Filmon to chair the Capital Region Review Committee. The panel looked at land-use planning and economic development between the City of Winnipeg and surrounding municipalities. Thompson along with the mayors and reeves of the 14 municipalities adjacent to Winnipeg began to meet on a regular basis starting in October 1998, thus forming the Winnipeg Metropolitan Region. Due to a change of government in September 1999, however, creating a regional planning authority took longer than originally foreseen.

The Capital Region was originally defined in 2006, through The Capital Region Partnership Act, to include 16 municipalities.

A pro-economic growth planning document was released in November 2018, called Securing Our Future: An Action Plan for Winnipeg's Metropolitan Region.

In October 2019, Dentons released a speech and discussion document, For the Benefit of All: Regional Competitiveness and Collaboration in the Winnipeg Metro Region, which sought to reform regional planning. Upon publication, Premier Brian Pallister and Winnipeg Mayor Brian Bowman spoke in favour of creating a new entity to manage development and transportation in the Winnipeg Metro Region.

== Membership ==
The Winnipeg Metro Region is located in the Red River Valley in the southeast portion of the province of Manitoba, and is bounded to the north by the south basin of Lake Winnipeg.

The Region was originally defined in The Capital Region Partnership Act (2006) to include 16 municipalities. Since that time, the Town of Niverville and the Village of Dunnottar have been incorporated into the Winnipeg Metropolitan Region, giving the Region 18 municipalities in total.

The Region today comprises the following cities, towns, and RMs:

- City of Winnipeg
- City of Selkirk
- Town of Stonewall
- Town of Niverville
- Village of Dunnottar
- RM of Cartier
- RM of East St. Paul
- RM of Headingley
- RM of Macdonald
- RM of Ritchot
- RM of Rockwood
- RM of Rosser
- RM of Springfield
- RM of St. Andrews
- RM of St. Clements
- RM of St. François Xavier
- RM of Taché
- RM of West St. Paul

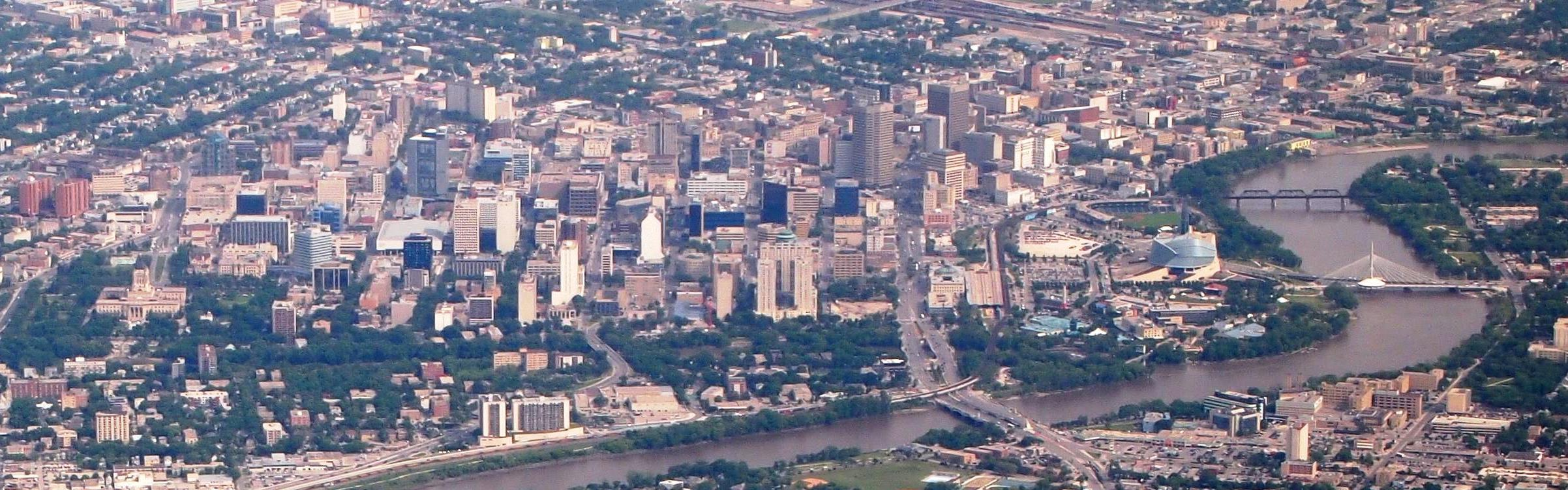
An aerial view of Winnipeg.

However, there are some municipalities that are geographically (entirely or largely) within the Region's territory that are not officially part of the Metro Region. These include the town of Teulon, the village of Garson, and the First Nation reserve of Brokenhead Ojibway Nation.

=== Winnipeg census metropolitan area ===
The Winnipeg Metro Region includes the smaller Winnipeg census metropolitan area (CMA), with the addition of the Brokenhead Ojibway Reserve. The included CMA municipalities are:

- Winnipeg
- East St. Paul
- Headingley
- Ritchot
- Rosser
- Springfield
- St. Clements
- St. François Xavier
- Taché
- West St. Paul

== Demographics ==
=== Population ===
The population of the Winnipeg Metro Region is greatly concentrated within the city of Winnipeg itself, which has 86.5% of the Region's population residing in less than 6% of its land area. On the provincial level, the city has 54.9% of the province's population, while the Region's share is 63.5%.

| Census area | 1991 census | 1996 census | 2001 census | 2006 census | 2011 census | 2016 census | 2021 census |
|---|---|---|---|---|---|---|---|
| City of Winnipeg | 615,215 | 618,477 | 619,544 | 633,451 | 663,617 | 705,244 | 749,607 |
| Winnipeg CMA | 660,450 | 672,109 | 676,594 | 694,668 | 730,018 | 778,489 | 834,678 |
| Winnipeg Metropolitan Region | 696,453 | 705,806 | 711,455 | 730,305 | 771,616 | 821,537 | 873,880 |

=== Ethnicity ===
Largest panethnic group in Winnipeg Metropolitan Region by census tract based on the 2021 census

Panethnic groups in Metro Winnipeg (2001−2021)
| Panethnic group | 2021 | | 2016 | | 2011 | | 2006 | | 2001 | |
| Panethnic group | Pop. | % | Pop. | % | Pop. | % | Pop. | % | Pop. | % |
|---|---|---|---|---|---|---|---|---|---|---|
| European (Note: 2001-2016: Statistic includes all persons that did not make up part of a visible minority or an indigenous identity. 2021: Statistic includes all persons belonging to the non-indigenous and non-visible minority “White” population group.) | 460,240 | 56.15% | 473,360 | 62.16% | 495,445 | 69.33% | 514,715 | 75.03% | 523,405 | 79.1% |
| Indigenous | 102,075 | 12.45% | 92,810 | 12.19% | 78,420 | 10.97% | 68,385 | 9.97% | 55,755 | 8.43% |
| Southeast Asian (Note: Statistic includes total responses of "Filipino" and "Southeast Asian" under visible minority section on census.) | 94,700 | 11.55% | 81,875 | 10.75% | 63,740 | 8.92% | 42,275 | 6.16% | 35,125 | 5.31% |
| South Asian | 63,805 | 7.78% | 38,100 | 5% | 23,175 | 3.24% | 15,295 | 2.23% | 12,290 | 1.86% |
| African | 40,920 | 4.99% | 27,375 | 3.59% | 17,840 | 2.5% | 14,475 | 2.11% | 11,440 | 1.73% |
| East Asian (Note: Statistic includes total responses of "Chinese", "Korean", and "Japanese" under visible minority section on census.) | 28,525 | 3.48% | 25,270 | 3.32% | 19,375 | 2.71% | 16,720 | 2.44% | 13,470 | 2.04% |
| Middle Eastern (Note: Statistic includes total responses of "West Asian" and "Arab" under visible minority section on census.) | 10,480 | 1.28% | 7,110 | 0.93% | 4,705 | 0.66% | 4,020 | 0.59% | 1,955 | 0.3% |
| Latin American | 9,160 | 1.12% | 6,825 | 0.9% | 6,560 | 0.92% | 5,475 | 0.8% | 4,550 | 0.69% |
| Other/Multiracial (Note: Statistic includes total responses of "Visible minority, n.i.e." and "Multiple visible minorities" under visible minority section on census.) | 10,595 | 1.29% | 8,810 | 1.16% | 5,390 | 0.75% | 4,680 | 0.68% | 3,735 | 0.56% |
| Total responses | 819,715 | 98.21% | 761,540 | 97.82% | 714,635 | 97.89% | 686,040 | 98.76% | 661,725 | 98.58% |
| Total population | 834,678 | 100% | 778,489 | 100% | 730,018 | 100% | 694,668 | 100% | 671,274 | 100% |
Note: Totals greater than 100% due to multiple origin responses

=== Language ===
The question on knowledge of languages allows for multiple responses.

Knowledge of Languages in Metro Winnipeg
| Language | 2021 | | 2011 | | 2001 | |
| Language | Pop. | % | Pop. | % | Pop. | % |
|---|---|---|---|---|---|---|
| English | 805,680 | 98.29% | 711,285 | 99.53% | 655,360 | 99.04% |
| French | 83,365 | 10.17% | 76,765 | 10.74% | 74,460 | 11.25% |
| Tagalog | 64,725 | 7.9% | 45,745 | 6.4% | 23,560 | 3.56% |
| Punjabi | 40,105 | 4.89% | 12,010 | 1.68% | 6,130 | 0.93% |
| Hindi | 23,670 | 2.89% | 6,900 | 0.97% | 3,245 | 0.49% |
| Spanish | 16,550 | 2.02% | 13,475 | 1.89% | 10,655 | 1.61% |
| German | 15,755 | 1.92% | 23,485 | 3.29% | 28,485 | 4.3% |
| Mandarin | 15,240 | 1.86% | 3,590 | 0.5% | 1,490 | 0.23% |
| Ukrainian | 9,720 | 1.19% | 13,490 | 1.89% | 20,865 | 3.15% |
| Russian | 9,615 | 1.17% | 5,495 | 0.77% | 3,100 | 0.47% |
| Arabic | 9,470 | 1.16% | 4,485 | 0.63% | 1,900 | 0.29% |
| Portuguese | 8,605 | 1.05% | 6,595 | 0.92% | 7,965 | 1.2% |
| Cantonese | 8,165 | 1% | 4,365 | 0.61% | 3,025 | 0.46% |
| Urdu | 6,240 | 0.76% | 2,315 | 0.32% | 1,115 | 0.17% |
| Polish | 6,145 | 0.75% | 7,380 | 1.03% | 11,005 | 1.66% |
| Vietnamese | 6,015 | 0.73% | 3,825 | 0.54% | 3,900 | 0.59% |
| Yoruba | 5,350 | 0.65% | —N/a | —N/a | —N/a | —N/a |
| Italian | 4,860 | 0.59% | 5,440 | 0.76% | 6,740 | 1.02% |
| Gujarati | 4,280 | 0.52% | 1,310 | 0.18% | 485 | 0.07% |
| Tigrigna | 4,100 | 0.5% | 1,010 | 0.14% | —N/a | —N/a |
| Korean | 3,900 | 0.48% | 2,660 | 0.37% | 885 | 0.13% |
| Hebrew | 3,690 | 0.45% | 2,575 | 0.36% | 1,625 | 0.25% |
| Amharic | 3,370 | 0.41% | 1,605 | 0.22% | —N/a | —N/a |
| Ojibway | 3,265 | 0.4% | 2,260 | 0.32% | 3,535 | 0.53% |
| Ilocano | 3,015 | 0.37% | 1,165 | 0.16% | —N/a | —N/a |
| Swahili | 2,775 | 0.34% | 1,200 | 0.17% | 550 | 0.08% |
| Bengali | 2,660 | 0.32% | 630 | 0.09% | 275 | 0.04% |
| Serbo-Croatian | 2,630 | 0.32% | 2,085 | 0.29% | 3,535 | 0.53% |
| Plautdietsch | 2,190 | 0.27% | —N/a | —N/a | —N/a | —N/a |
| Cree | 1,805 | 0.22% | 1,555 | 0.22% | 2,850 | 0.43% |
| Pampangan (Kapampangan, Pampango) | 1,635 | 0.2% | —N/a | —N/a | —N/a | —N/a |
| Somali | 1,590 | 0.19% | 735 | 0.1% | —N/a | —N/a |
| Dutch | 1,565 | 0.19% | 1,935 | 0.27% | 2,980 | 0.45% |
| Iranian; Persian | 1,525 | 0.19% | —N/a | —N/a | —N/a | —N/a |
| Greek | 1,500 | 0.18% | 1,435 | 0.2% | 1,655 | 0.25% |
| Igbo | 1,400 | 0.17% | —N/a | —N/a | —N/a | —N/a |
| Cebuano | 1,365 | 0.17% | —N/a | —N/a | —N/a | —N/a |
| Japanese | 1,310 | 0.16% | 860 | 0.12% | 975 | 0.15% |
| Kurdish | 1,170 | 0.14% | 265 | 0.04% | 365 | 0.06% |
| Lao | 1,165 | 0.14% | 960 | 0.13% | 1,285 | 0.19% |
| Sinhala | 1,160 | 0.14% | 535 | 0.07% | 425 | 0.06% |
| Malayalam | 1,095 | 0.13% | 310 | 0.04% | 90 | 0.01% |
| Hungarian | 1,035 | 0.13% | 1,140 | 0.16% | 1,680 | 0.25% |
| Chinese, n.o.s | —N/a | —N/a | 6,430 | 0.9% | 5,650 | 0.85% |
| Persian | —N/a | —N/a | 1,950 | 0.27% | 810 | 0.12% |
| Total Responses | 819,715 | 98.21% | 714,635 | 97.89% | 661,725 | 98.58% |
| Total Population | 834,678 | 100% | 730,018 | 100% | 671,274 | 100% |

== Governance ==
Regional partnership is led by a board of governors. As of 2021, board members include:

- Scott Gillingham, City of Winnipeg councillor — board co-chair
- Shelley Hart, RM of East St. Paul mayor — board co-chair
- John Orlikow, City of Winnipeg councillor
- Larry Johannson, City of Selkirk mayor
- Christa Vann Mitchell, RM of Cartier reeve
- Jim Robson, RM of Headingley councillor
- Brad Erb, RM of Macdonald reeve
- Chris Ewen, RM of Ritchot mayor
- J. Wesley Taplin, RM of Rockwood reeve
- Fran Smee, RM of Rosser reeve
- Tiffany Fell, RM of Springfield mayor
- Joy Sul, RM of St. Andrews mayor
- Debbie Fiebelkorn, RM of St. Clements mayor
- Rick van Wyk, RM of St. François Xavier reeve
- Justin Denis Bohemier, RM of Taché mayor
- Cheryl Christian, RM of West St. Paul mayor
- Myron Dyck, Town of Niverville mayor
- Clive Hinds, Town of Stonewall mayor
- Rick Gamble, Village of Dunnottar mayor

In addition to those located entirely in the City of Winnipeg, the Region falls into several federal electoral districts:

- Charleswood—St. James—Assiniboia—Headingley
- Kildonan—St. Paul
- Portage—Lisgar (northeastern portion)
- Provencher (northwestern portion)
- Selkirk—Interlake—Eastman (southern portion)

== See also ==
- List of Manitoba regions
- List of communities in Manitoba
- Southern Manitoba
- Metropolitan Corporation of Greater Winnipeg
- Winnipeg Regional Health Authority
- Metro Winnipeg Transit
- Metro Winnipeg (newspaper)
- Amalgamation of Winnipeg
- Regional planning
