= Grosse Isle, Manitoba =

Community in Manitoba

Grosse Isle
- Village
- Location of Grosse Isle in Manitoba
- Coordinates: 50°03′50″N 97°26′31″W
- Country: Canada
- Province: Manitoba
- Municipality: Rural Municipality of Rockwood
- Municipality: Rural Municipality of Rosser

Government
  - MP (Selkirk—Interlake—Eastman): James Bezan (CPC)
  - MLA (Lakeside): Trevor King (PC)
  - Reeve (R.M. of Rockwood): Wes Taplin
  - Reeve (R.M of Rosser): Frances Smee
  - Councillors: Councillors: Curtis McClintock (R.M. of Rockwood); Lee Garfinkel (R.M. of Rosser)
- Elevation: 245 m (804 ft)
- Time zone: UTC-6 (CST)
  - Summer (DST): UTC-5 (CDT)
- Postal Code: R0C 1G0

Grosse Isle is a rural community 13 kilometres (8.1 miles) north-west of Winnipeg, Manitoba. It is partially in the Rural Municipality of Rosser and partially in the Rural Municipality of Rockwood. The name is from the French "Grosse Île", meaning big island.

== History ==
French hunters were the first to refer to the area as "Grosse Isle." The name, which translates to "Large Island," was chosen because the tract of land was heavily wooded and surrounded by a swamp, creating the appearance of an island. The name began to be more widely used during the 1852 flood, when people fleeing floodwaters sought refuge on "the island". In 1904, a Canadian National Railway point was established there.

== Attractions ==
Grosse Isle is home to a heritage railway, the Prairie Dog Central Railway, and a heritage site encompassing a school, church, prairie home, caboose and picnic spaces.

== In media ==
In 2014, the Western TV show The Pinkertons was filmed in Grosse Isle. Grosse Isle was among the Manitoba filming locations for the 2022 Christmas movie We Wish You a Married Christmas.
