= Manitoba Provincial Road 233 =

Provincial road in Manitoba, Canada

Provincial Road 233
- PR 233 highlighted in red

Route information
- Maintained by Department of Infrastructure
- Length: 63.9 km (39.7 mi)
- Existed: 1966–present

Major junctions
- South end: PTH 68 west of Arborg
- PTH 17 in Fisher Branch
- North end: PR 325 north of Fisherton

Location
- Country: Canada
- Province: Manitoba
- Rural municipalities: Bifrost-Riverton, Fisher

Highway system
- Provincial highways in Manitoba; Winnipeg City Routes
← PR 232	→ PR 234

Provincial Road 233 (PR 233) is a 63.9-kilometre-long (39.7 mi) north–south highway in the Interlake Region of Manitoba. It serves to connect Framnes, Vidir, Sylvan, Kilkenny, and Fisherton with the town of Fisher Branch.

== Route description ==
PR 233 begins in the Municipality of Bifrost-Riverton at an intersection with PTH 68 just west of Arborg near the Arborg Airport. It heads north as a paved two-lane highway to go through a switchback as it crosses a bridge over the Icelandic River and travels through the hamlet of Framnes. The highway has an intersection with PR 329, where the road turns to gravel, before passing through the hamlet of Vidir and having an intersection with PR 326 a couple kilometres later. PR 233 now makes a sharp left, heading due west as it travels through Sylvan, where it enters the Rural Municipality of Fisher.

PR 233 temporarily enters a wooded area as travels through a switchback while passing by the Fisher Branch Airport. The highway has an intersection with PTH 17, where it becomes paved again, becoming known as Tache Street as it travels directly through the centre of downtown Fisher Branch, where it crosses over a branch of the Fisher River. It leaves Fisher Branch and heads due west through farmland for several kilometres to come to a four-way stop, where PR 233 turns north, becoming known as Fisherton Road and turning to gravel once again while the road continues east as Road 141N towards Kilkenny. PR 233 travels through Fisherton, where it crosses the Fisher River, before coming to an end at an intersection with PR 325 several kilometres west of Hodgson. The entire length of PR 233 is signed as a north–south highway, with the exclusion of the PTH 17 intersection, where it is signed as east–west.

== History ==
Provincial Road 226
- Location: Municipality of Bifrost-Riverton
- Length: 14.8 km (9.2 mi)
- Existed: 1966–1990

Prior to 1990, what is now PR 233 south of the junction with PR 326 was known as Provincial Road 226 (PR 226), while PR 233 continued east along the east-west portion of PR 326 past Okno, then meandered northeast through the Shorncliffe community (where it met the former PR 516) before coming to an end at an intersection with PR 234 at the hamlet of Washow Bay. Portions of this former route are now Municipal Roads 11E, 141N, 14E, and 144N. The original length of PR 233 was 79.6 kilometres (49.5 mi).

== Major intersections ==
Division	Location	km	mi	Destinations	Notes
Bifrost-Riverton		0.0	0.0	PTH 68 – Arborg, Poplarfield	Southern terminus
Bifrost-Riverton	Framnes	3.3	2.1	Bridge over the Icelandic River	
Bifrost-Riverton		9.9	6.2	PR 329 – Broad Valley, Riverton	Southern end of unpaved section
Bifrost-Riverton		14.8	9.2	PR 326 east – Okno	Western terminus of PR 326
Fisher		31.6	19.6	Fisher Branch Airport	Access road into airport
Fisher	Fisher Branch	40.9	25.4	PTH 17 – Poplarfield, Hodgson	Northern end of unpaved section
Fisher		52.4	32.6	Road 141N – Kilkenny	Southern end of unpaved section
Fisher	Fisherton	60.9	37.8	Bridge over the Fisher River	
Fisher		63.9	39.7	PR 325 – Hodgson, Ashern	Northern terminus; northern end of unpaved section
1.000 mi = 1.609 km; 1.000 km = 0.621 mi
