= Manitoba Provincial Road 329 =

Provincial Road in Manitoba, Canada

Provincial Road 329
- PR 329 highlighted in red

Route information
- Maintained by Department of Infrastructure
- Length: 47.6 km (29.6 mi)
- Existed: 1966–present

Major junctions
- West end: PTH 17 near Broad Valley
- PR 233 near Vidir; PTH 8 in Riverton
- East end: Sandy Bar Beach on Lake Winnipeg

Location
- Country: Canada
- Province: Manitoba
- Rural municipalities: Fisher, Bifrost-Riverton

Highway system
- Provincial highways in Manitoba; Winnipeg City Routes
← PR 328	→ PR 330

Provincial Road 329 (PR 329) is a 47.6-kilometre-long (29.6 mi) east–west highway in the Interlake Region of Manitoba. It connects the towns of Broad Valley and Riverton with Sandy Bar Beach on Lake Winnipeg via Morweena.

== Route description ==
PR 329 begins in the Rural Municipality of Fisher at an intersection with PTH 17, just west of Broad Valley. It heads due east as a gravel road, travelling through farmland for several kilometres and passing through the locality of Zbaraz before entering the Municipality of Bifrost-Riverton. The highway enters the hamlet of Morweena, travelling through the centre of town as it crosses the Icelandic River twice before leaving the hamlet and continuing east to an intersection with PR 233 between Vidir and Framnes. Now PR 329 travels just south of Hayek as it heads towards a junction with PR 326, where it becomes paved, and the locality of Ledwyn. Entering the town of Riverton at a junction with PTH 8 (Veterans Memorial Highway), it becomes known as Thompson Drive and heads through neighbourhoods along the southern side of downtown and crosses another bridge over the Icelandic River. Travelling through more neighbourhoods, the highway has an intersection with PR 222 (Sandvik Road) before leaving Riverton and turning to gravel again, winding its way southeast through rural areas to come to a dead end at Sandy Bar Beach, along the shoreline of Lake Winnipeg.

== Major intersections ==
Division	Location	km	mi	Destinations	Notes
Fisher		0.0	0.0	PTH 17 – Poplarfield, Fisher Branch	Western terminus; road continues west as Road 135N; begins as gravel road
Bifrost-Riverton	Morweena	13.5	8.4	Bridge over the Icelandic River	
Bifrost-Riverton	Morweena	16.6	10.3	Bridge over the Icelandic River	
Bifrost-Riverton		21.5	13.4	PR 233 – Fisher Branch, Arborg	Former PR 226
Bifrost-Riverton		28.1	17.5	PR 326 – Okno, Arborg	
Bifrost-Riverton		28.1	17.5	Pavement begins	
Bifrost-Riverton	Riverton	41.3	25.7	PTH 8 (Veterans Memorial Highway) – Gull Harbour, Gimli	
Bifrost-Riverton	Riverton	42.4	26.3	Bridge over the Icelandic River	
Bifrost-Riverton	Riverton	42.9	26.7	PR 222 south (Sandvik Road) – Hnausa	Northern terminus of PR 222
Bifrost-Riverton		42.9	26.7	Pavement ends	
Bifrost-Riverton		47.6	29.6	Sandy Bar Beach	Dead end at Lake Winnipeg; eastern terminus
1.000 mi = 1.609 km; 1.000 km = 0.621 mi
