= Manitoba Provincial Road 222 =

Provincial road in Manitoba, Canada

Provincial Road 222
- PR 222 highlighted in red

Route information
- Maintained by Manitoba Infrastructure
- Length: 42.6 km (26.5 mi)
- Existed: 1966–present

Major junctions
- South end: PTH 9 / PR 231 at Gimli
- PTH 68 in Hnausa
- North end: PR 329 at Riverton

Location
- Country: Canada
- Province: Manitoba
- Rural municipalities: Bifrost – Riverton; Gimli

Highway system
- Provincial highways in Manitoba; Winnipeg City Routes
← PR 221	→ PR 224

Provincial Road 222 (PR 222) is a provincial road in the Interlake Region of the Canadian province of Manitoba. Essentially a northerly continuation of Highway 9, the road extends for 42.6 kilometres (26.5 mi) along the western shore of Lake Winnipeg between the communities of Gimli and Riverton.

The road is the inspiration for and namesake of singer-songwriter John K. Samson's 2010 EP Provincial Road 222, which consists of three songs set in geographic locations along the route.

== Route description ==
PR 222 begins in the Rural Municipality of Gimli in the northern part of the town of Gimli at an intersection between PTH 9 (7th Avenue) and PR 231 (N 5th Avenue). It heads north out of town along the coastline of Lake Winnipeg, travelling past several lakefront subdivisions and campgrounds to pass through Camp Morton, where it has an intersection with Camp Morton Road (PR 324), which provides access to Camp Morton Provincial Park, as well as making a sharp left hand turn across a railroad track before making an immediate right and heading north again. Moving away from the coastline, PR 222 travels past several more subdivisions on its way to Arnes, where it has an intersection with Colonization Road, which provides access to Silver Harbour.

PR 222 enters the Rural Municipality of Bifrost-Riverton as it closes back in on the coast, travelling through Finns to enter Hnausa, passing by Eyolfsstodum Historical Site and Hnausa Beach Provincial Park to come to an intersection with PTH 68, where the pavement ends and PR 222 makes a sharp right. The highway passes by the Hnausa dock / boat launch as it winds its way along the coastline past lakeside homes and through the town of Balaton Beach. Leaving the lake behind for the final time, PR 222 makes a sharp left at an access road to Kaltenthaler Beach to enter rural farmland, making a slight right and winding its way north to enter the town of Riverton. Travelling through neighbourhoods along Sandvik Road, the highway comes to an end at a junction with PR 329 (Thompson Drive) just across the Icelandic River from downtown. The entire length of Provincial Road 222 is a two lane highway.

== Major intersections ==
Division	Location	km	mi	Destinations	Notes
Gimli	Gimli	0.0	0.0	PTH 9 south (7th Avenue) – Gimli; PR 231 west (N 5th Avenue) – Fraserwood	Southern terminus; eastern terminus of PR 231; road continues south as PTH 9; southern end of paved section
Gimli	Camp Morton	8.3– 8.4	5.2– 5.2	PR 324 west (Camp Morton Road); Camp Morton Road – Camp Morton Provincial Park	Eastern terminus of PR 324
Gimli	Arnes	18.2	11.3	Colonization Road – Silver Harbour	
Bifrost - Riverton	Hnausa	28.1	17.5	Eyolfsstodum Historical Site	Access road to site
Bifrost - Riverton	Hnausa	29.1	18.1	Hnausa Beach Provincial Park	Access road into park
Bifrost - Riverton	Hnausa	29.7	18.5	Road 129N to PTH 68 west – Arborg	Connection to PTH 68; northern end of paved section
Bifrost - Riverton		38.1	23.7	Kaltenthaler Beach	Access road to beach
Bifrost - Riverton	Riverton	42.6	26.5	PR 329 (Thompson Drive) – Riverton, Broad Valley, Sandy Bar Beach	Northern terminus; road continues north as King Street
1.000 mi = 1.609 km; 1.000 km = 0.621 mi
