= Manitoba Highway 17 =

Highway in Manitoba

Provincial Trunk Highway 17
- Teulon Rd; Beach Rd; Clouston Rd
- PTH 17 highlighted in red

Route information
- Maintained by Manitoba Infrastructure
- Length: 127 km (79 mi)
- Existed: 1983–present
- Known for: Narcisse Snake Dens

Major junctions
- East end: PTH 9 near Winnipeg Beach
- PTH 8 near Winnipeg Beach; PTH 7 at Teulon; PTH 68 at Poplarfield
- North end: PR 224 / PR 325 near Hodgson

Location
- Country: Canada
- Province: Manitoba
- Rural municipalities: Armstrong; Fisher; Rockwood; St. Andrews
- Towns: Teulon

Highway system
- Provincial highways in Manitoba; Winnipeg City Routes
← PTH 16A	→ PTH 18

Provincial Trunk Highway 17 (PTH 17) is a provincial highway in the Interlake Region of the Canadian province of Manitoba. It runs from a junction with PR 224 and PR 325 near Hodgson to a junction with PTH 9 near Winnipeg Beach.

PTH 17 is signed as a north-south route from PR 325 to PTH 7 at Teulon and an east-west route from PTH 7 to PTH 9. The majority of the route is paved, with a gravel section between PTH 8 and PTH 9. The speed limit is 100 km/h (62 mph) except through urban areas.

The route near Narcisse can be very dangerous as thousands of snakes cross PTH 17 to get to/from the Narcisse Snake Dens. As snakes are run over by vehicles, the road becomes very slippery. A series of 'garter-snake fences' were built in this area to protect both the snakes and vehicle traffic.

== Route description ==
PTH 17 begins in the Rural Municipality of St. Andrews at an intersection with PTH 9 a few kilometers south of Winnipeg Beach, with the road heading due west as a gravel road. 5 kilometres (3.1 mi) later, it has an intersection with PTH 8, where the highway becomes paved, crossing into the Rural Municipality of Rockwood after a few kilometers of rural farmland. PTH 17 then travels straight through the town of Teulon, where it has an intersection with PTH 7, before curving northwest and winding its way through woodlands for the next several kilometers, where it passes by Norris Lake Provincial Park, before entering the Rural Municipality of Armstrong.

At the intersection with PTH 7 in Teulon, PTH 17 switches signed cardinal directions from east-west to north-south.

PTH 17 begins a concurrency (overlap) with PR 229 as it travels through Inwood, where it makes a sharp turn to the north at a junction with PR 416. PR 229 splits off shortly thereafter and PTH 17 winds its way north through a mix of farmland and wooded areas for the next several kilometers, passing through Narcisse, where it crosses a former railroad line as well as having intersections with Road 114N (which leads to the site of Bender Hamlet) and PR 231. The highway passes by the Narcisse Snake Dens and the community of Chatfield, where it has an intersection with PR 419, before crossing into the Rural Municipality of Fisher. PTH 17 has many switchbacks along its route in the Rural Municipality of Armstrong.

PTH 17 almost immediately travels through Poplarfield, where it crosses PTH 68, as it heads due north through farmland to have intersections with Road 134N, which provides accessible to Broad Valley, and PR 329. The highway travels along the eastern side of Fisher Branch, where it junctions with PR 233 and crosses a creek, before continuing north to become concurrent with PR 325. PTH 17 / PR 325 make a sharp curve to the east to pass through Hodgson and cross Bottle Creek before coming to an intersection with PR 224 at the southern edge of the Peguis First Nation, where PTH 17 ends and the road continues east as PR 325.

The entire length of PTH 17 is a rural, two-lane highway.

== History ==
Provincial Road 228
- Location: Winnipeg Beach–Narcisse
- Length: 65 km (40 mi)
- Existed: 1966–1983

Prior to 1964, PTH 17 was the designation of the route connecting PTH 3 near Crystal City to the US border. This highway is now the southernmost section of PTH 34.

Originally, the section north of PR 231 (along with the section of PR 231 from there to PTH 7) was the northern configuration of PTH 7 between 1956 and 1966 before it was reconfigured to its current route. After PTH 7 was reconfigured to Arborg, the route was redesignated as PTH 16. The section south of what is now PR 231 was designated as PR 228. The route number was eliminated in 1979 when the Manitoba portion of the Yellowhead Highway was changed from PTH 4 to PTH 16 so that the route maintained one number throughout the four western provinces. PTH 16 was eliminated and it became an extension of PR 228 and PR 231.

PTH 17 was designated in 1983, replacing part of PR 228, but its south end was at PTH 7. In 1987, PTH 17 was extended east to PTH 8, replacing the remainder of PR 228. It extended east to its current end in 1989. This final extension is a gravel road.

== Major intersections ==
Division	Location	km	mi	Destinations	Notes
St. Andrews		0	0.0	PTH 9 – Gimli, Selkirk, Winnipeg Beach	Eastern terminus
St. Andrews		5	3.1	PTH 8 (Veterans Memorial Highway) – Gimli, Winnipeg	Paved highway begins
Rockwood	No major junctions				
Town of Teulon		20	12	PTH 7 – Arborg, Winnipeg	PTH 17 north begins
Rockwood	No major junctions				
Armstrong		42	26	PR 229 east – Winnipeg Beach	South end of PR 229 concurrency
Armstrong	Inwood	44	27	PR 416 south	
Armstrong		46	29	PR 229 west	North end of PR 229 concurrency
Armstrong	Narcisse	65	40	PR 231 east	
Armstrong		76	47	PR 419 west – Chatfield, Lundar	
Fisher	Poplarfield	91	57	PTH 68 – Eriksdale, Arborg	
Fisher		103	64	PR 329 east – Morweena, Riverton	
Fisher	Fisher Branch	113	70	PR 233	
Fisher		119	74	PR 325 west – Ashern	Southern end of PR 325 concurrency
Fisher		127	79	PR 224 north – Peguis, Fisher River	Southern terminus of PR 224
Fisher		127	79	PR 325 east – Riverton	Northern terminus; roadway continues as PR 325
1.000 mi = 1.609 km; 1.000 km = 0.621 mi: Concurrency terminus; Route transition
