= Manitoba Highway 8 =

Highway in Manitoba

Provincial Trunk Highway 8
- Veterans Memorial Highway, McPhillips Street
- PTH 8 highlighted in red

Route information
- Maintained by Manitoba Infrastructure
- Length: 162 km (101 mi)
- Existed: 1928–present

Major junctions
- South end: Route 180 at Winnipeg city limits
- PTH 101 near Winnipeg; PTH 27 at St. Andrews; PTH 67 near Selkirk; PTH 17 near Dunnottar; PTH 68 near Arborg
- North end: Hecla-Grindstone Provincial Park

Location
- Country: Canada
- Province: Manitoba
- Rural municipalities: Bifrost – Riverton; Gimli; St. Andrews; West St. Paul
- Major cities: Winnipeg

Highway system
- Provincial highways in Manitoba; Winnipeg City Routes
← PTH 7	→ PTH 9

Provincial Trunk Highway 8 (PTH 8) is a provincial primary highway located in the Canadian province of Manitoba. It runs from the north limit of the City of Winnipeg, where it meets with Route 180 (McPhillips Street), north to Hecla-Grindstone Provincial Park. The highway between Winnipeg and PR 230 is known as McPhillips Street. At PR 230, McPhillips Street becomes McPhillips Road and continues along PR 230 to PTH 9 (Selkirk Bypass). The route is a major road connecting Winnipeg with the communities of Winnipeg Beach and Gimli. The speed limit is 100 km/h (62 mph).

== Route description ==
PTH 8 begins in the Rural Municipality of West St. Paul at an intersection with Emes Road on the Winnipeg city line, with the road continuing south into Winnipeg as Winnipeg Route 180 (Route 180 / McPhillips Street). The road heads northeast as a 4-lane divided highway to immediately have a cloverleaf interchange with PTH 101 (North Perimeter Highway) before traveling through rural areas, having intersections with PR 220 (Grassmere Road) and PR 321 (Miller Road) before entering the Rural Municipality of St. Andrews. PTH 8 has intersections with PTH 27 (Parkdale Road) and PR 230 (McPhillips Road) as it passes by the hamlet of Parkdale and the St. Andrews Airport before curving due north and narrowing to 2-lanes.

The highway has intersections with PTH 67 (Fort Garry Road), PTH 17, and PR 225 as it bypasses Selkirk, Petersfield, and Dunnottar a few kilometers to the west, where it crosses Netley Creek at the hamlet of Netley and begins paralleling the western coastline of Lake Winnipeg. PTH 8 goes through a switchback near Melnice before entering the Rural Municipality of Gimli at an intersection with PR 229 near Winnipeg Beach.

PTH 8 has an intersection with PR 519 near Sandy Hook and crosses Willow Creek near Husavik before traveling through the town of Gimli, where it passes just to the east of former RCAF Station Gimli and has an intersection with PR 231 (which connects to the northern end of PTH 9). The highway bypasses several beach communities as it has an intersection with PR 324 and crosses into the Municipality of Bifrost - Riverton.

PTH 8 has an intersection with PTH 68 in Hnausa before crossing the Icelandic River and traveling through the town of Riverton, where it has an intersection with PR 329, which connects to PR 222. The highway now becomes more remote as it makes a sharp curve to the east, having intersections with PR 234 near Washow Bay and Grindstone Road (which provides access to Blacks Point and Grindstone). The highway turns southward to cross a narrow Causeway over a portion of the Lake Winnipeg Narrows onto Hecla Island, entering Unorganized East Division No. 18 and Hecla-Grindstone Provincial Park. It winds its way along Hecla Island to travel through the hamlet of Hecla Village, where the PTH 8 designation ends and the road continues north to a dead end at Gull Harbour.

== History ==
PTH 8 formerly extended into the city of Winnipeg. Prior to 1966, PTH 8 followed McPhillips Street (present-day Winnipeg Route 180), Notre Dame Avenue (present-day Winnipeg Route 57), and Arlington Street to PTH 1 / PTH 4 (Portage Avenue); sharing a brief concurrency with PTH 6 along Notre Dame Avenue. When the Winnipeg Metro Routes were established in c. 1966, PTH 8 was decommissioned inside the Perimeter Highway.

== Photo gallery ==
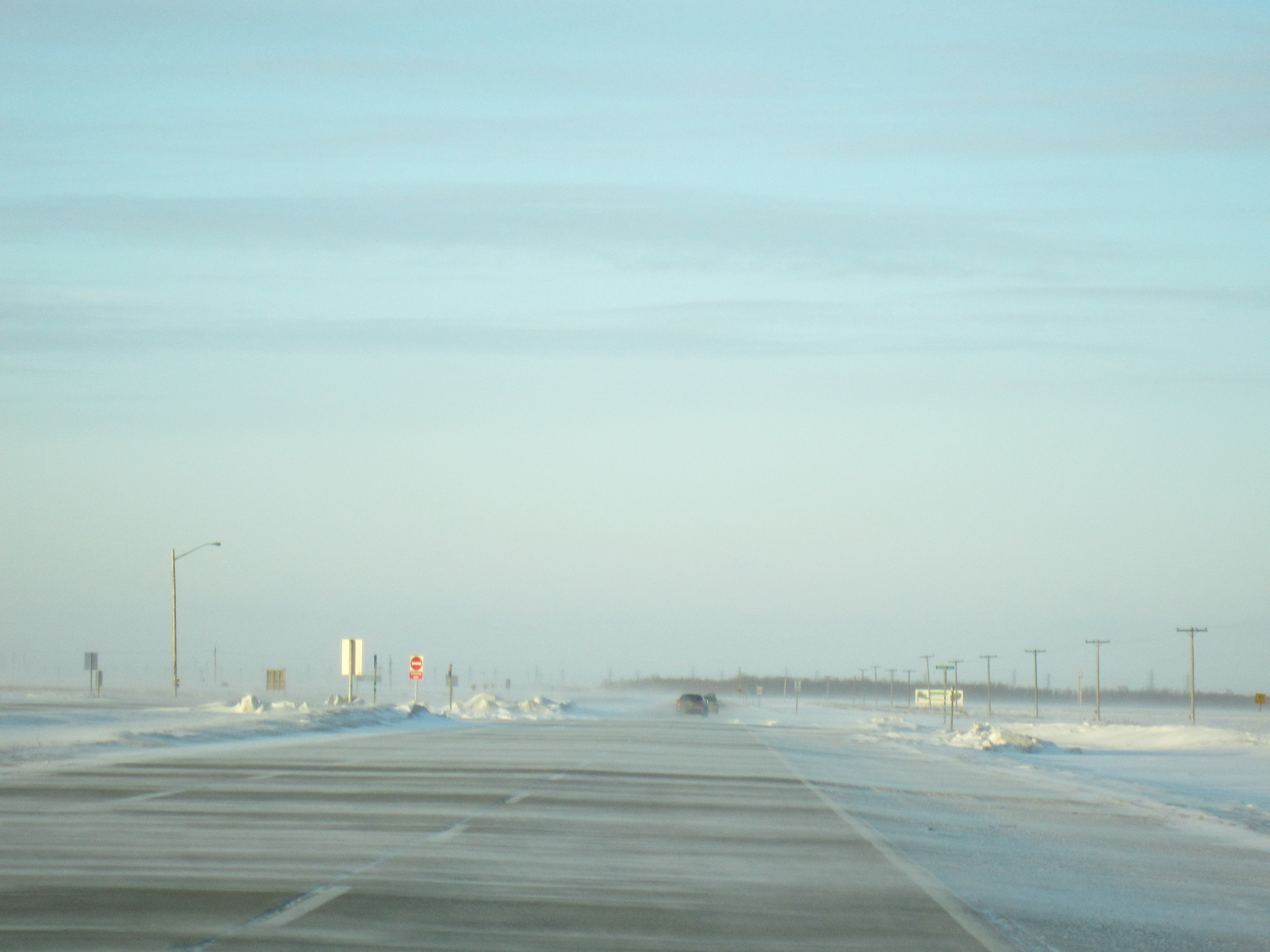
PTH 8 at St. Andrews

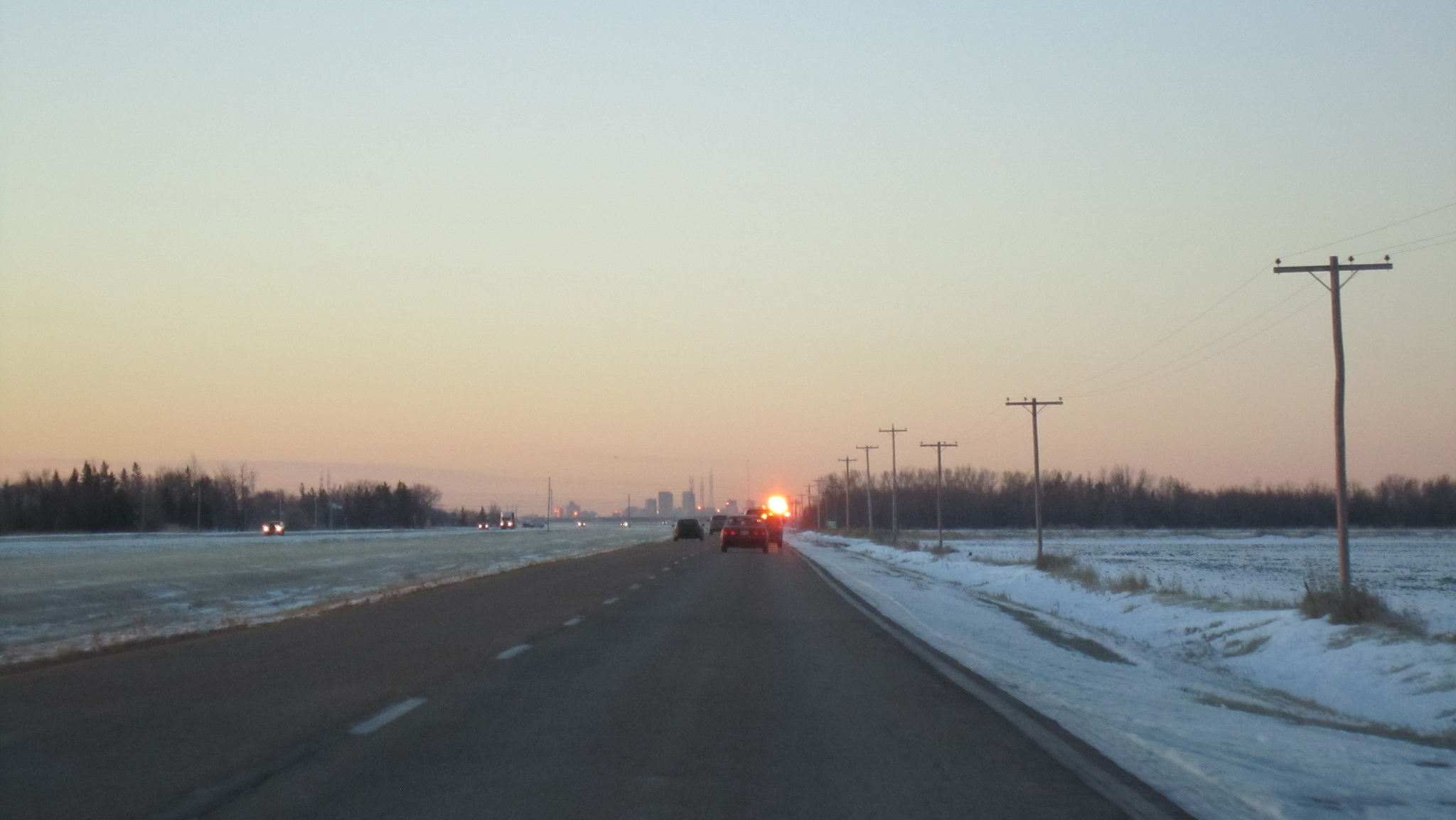
PTH 8 at St. Andrews

== Major intersections ==
Division	Location	km	mi	Destinations	Notes
City of Winnipeg		−13.0	−8.1	Arlington Street PTH 1 / Portage Avenue (Route 85)	Former PTH 8 southern terminus; former PTH 1 / PTH 4 concurrency
City of Winnipeg		−11.0	−6.8	Notre Dame Avenue (Route 57 east) / Arlington Street	Former PTH 6 south; former south end of PTH 6 concurrency; former PTH 8 followed Notre Dame Avenue
City of Winnipeg		−10.7	−6.6	Notre Dame Avenue (Route 57 west) Route 180 begins	Former PTH 6 north; former north end of PTH 6 concurrency; former PTH 8 followed McPhillips Street
City of Winnipeg		0.0	0.0	Route 180 ends / Emes Road	Winnipeg city limits; PTH 8 southern terminus
West St. Paul		1.1	0.68	PTH 101 (Perimeter Highway)	Interchange; PTH 101 exit 69
West St. Paul		2.1	1.3	Grassmere Road (PR 220 north)	
West St. Paul		6.6	4.1	PR 321 west (Miller Road) – Stony Mountain	
St. Andrews	Parkdale	9.3	5.8	PTH 27 east (Parkdale Road) – St. Andrews Airport	Former PTH 8A
St. Andrews	Parkdale	11.2	7.0	PR 230 north (McPhillips Road) – Selkirk	North end of McPhillips Street designation
St. Andrews		19.1	11.9	PTH 67 (Fort Garry Road) – Stonewall	Former PR 223
St. Andrews		30.6	19.0	Clandeboye Road	Former PR 515 east
St. Andrews		37.1	23.1	Petersfield Road – Petersfield	Former PR 413
St. Andrews		47.0	29.2	PTH 17 – Teulon, Fisher Branch	Former PR 228
St. Andrews		61.0	37.9	PR 225 east – Lake Winnipeg Beaches, Dunnottar	
↑ / ↓		61.0	37.9	PR 229 – Komarno, Winnipeg Beach	
Gimli		64.3	40.0	PR 519 east – Sandy Hook	
Gimli	Gimli	75.9	47.2	PR 231 – Fraserwood, Gimli	Connects to PTH 9
Gimli		84.1	52.3	PR 324 east – Camp Morton	
Gimli		87.3	54.2	Lake Forest Road	Former PR 324 west
Bifrost – Riverton		105.4	65.5	PTH 68 – Arborg, Eriksdale; Road 129N to PR 222 – Hnausa	
Bifrost – Riverton	Riverton	115.3	71.6	PR 329 – Broad Valley, Riverton	
Bifrost – Riverton		127.4	79.2	PR 234 north – Pine Dock, Matheson Island	
No. 18		139.6	86.7	Enters Hecla-Grindstone Provincial Park	
No. 18		162.2	100.8	unnamed road	PTH 8 northern terminus
1.000 mi = 1.609 km; 1.000 km = 0.621 mi: Closed/former; Route transition

== Related routes ==
=== Provincial Road 225 ===
Provincial Route 225
- Whytewold Road
- Location: Dunnottar
- Length: 6.2 km (3.9 mi)
- Existed: 1966–present

Provincial Road 225 (PR 225), also known as Whytewold Road, is a 6.2-kilometre-long (3.9 mi) east-west spur of PTH 8 in the Rural Municipality of St. Andrews, linking it with PTH 9 and the Whytewold neighborhood of the village of Dunnottar.

=== Provincial Road 324 ===
Provincial Road 324
- Camp Morton Road
- Location: Camp Morton
- Length: 1.6 km (0.99 mi)
- Existed: 1966–present

Provincial Road 324 (PR 324), also known as Camp Morton Road, is a short 1.6-kilometre-long (0.99 mi) east-west spur of PTH 8 in the Rural Municipality of Gimli, connecting it to Camp Morton Provincial Park (as well as the community of the same name) and PR 222. It is entirely a paved two-lane highway, with no other intersections or settlements along its route.

Previously, PR 324 extended further northwest, following a 3.2 kilometres (2.0 mi) concurrency (overlap) with PTH 8 and what is now Lake Forest Road to an intersection with PTH 7 in the tiny community of Rembrandt.

Division	Location	km	mi	Destinations	Notes
Gimli		0.0	0.0	PTH 8 (Veterans Memorial Highway) – Winnipeg, Riverton	Western terminus; road continues west as Road 116N
Gimli	Camp Morton	1.6	0.99	PR 222 – Hnausa, Gimli; Camp Morton Road – Camp Morton Provincial Park	Eastern terminus; road continues east as Camp Morton Road MM
1.000 mi = 1.609 km; 1.000 km = 0.621 mi

=== Provincial Road 519 ===
Provincial Road 519
- First Avenue
- Location: Sandy Hook
- Length: 2.8 km (1.7 mi)
- Existed: 1966–present

Provincial Road 519 (PR 519) is a short 2.8-kilometre-long (1.7 mi) east-west spur of PTH 8 in the Rural Municipality of Gimli, serving as an access road to the community of Sandy Hook, as well as connecting to PTH 9. Within Sandy Hook, it is known as First Avenue. The entire length of PR 519 is a paved two-lane highway.

Division	Location	km	mi	Destinations	Notes
Gimli		0.0	0.0	PTH 8 (Veterans Memorial Highway) – Winnipeg, Riverton	Western terminus; road continues west as Road 104N
Gimli	Sandy Hook	2.8	1.7	PTH 9 (Gimli Road) – Gimli, Winnipeg Beach	Eastern terminus; road continues east for a short distance as First Avenue to a dead end on the beach on Lake Winnipeg
1.000 mi = 1.609 km; 1.000 km = 0.621 mi
