= Manitoba Provincial Road 326 =

Provincial Road in Manitoba, Canada

Provincial Road 326
- PR 326 highlighted in red

Route information
- Maintained by Department of Infrastructure
- Length: 22.9 km (14.2 mi)
- Existed: 1966–present

Major junctions
- South end: PTH 68 in Arborg
- PR 329 near Ledwyn
- East end: PR 233 near Vidir

Location
- Country: Canada
- Province: Manitoba
- Rural municipalities: Bifrost-Riverton
- Towns: Arborg

Highway system
- Provincial highways in Manitoba; Winnipeg City Routes
← PR 325	→ PR 327

Provincial Road 326 (PR 326) is a 22.9-kilometre-long (14.2 mi) highway almost entirely within the Municipality of Bifrost-Riverton in the Interlake Region of Manitoba, Canada. It connects the town of Arborg with Okno and Fisher Branch. The highway switches cardinal directions near Okno from north–south to east–west.

== Route description ==
PR 326 begins in the town of Arborg at an intersection with PTH 68 at the south side of town. It heads north along Main Street for a short distance to cross a bridge over the Icelandic River before making a sharp right onto River Road at the southern fringes of downtown. It parallels the north bank of the Icelandic River as it travels through neighbourhoods before the highway makes a left onto Arborg Avenue, leaving town shortly thereafter and entering the Municipality of Bifrost-Riverton. The highway heads north through rural farmland for several kilometres, passing through a switchback before having a junction with PR 329 just west of Ledwyn. PR 326 now makes a sharp left onto Road 138N and travels along the southern side of Okno, with an access road via Road 10E, and the north side of Vidir Airport before the asphalt turns to gravel. PR 326 comes to an end a few kilometers later at an intersection with PR 233 just north of the hamlet of Vidir.

== History ==
Prior to 1990, the entire east–west section of PR 326 was part of a much longer PR 233, which continued on to Shorncliffe, Washow Bay, and PR 234. PR 326's original length was 16.3 kilometres (10.1 mi).

== Major intersections ==
Division	Location	km	mi	Destinations	Notes
Town of Arborg		0.0	0.0	PTH 68 – Hnausa, Poplarfield	Southern terminus
Town of Arborg		0.4	0.25	Bridge over the Icelandic River	
Bifrost-Riverton		11.4	7.1	PR 329 – Broad Valley, Riverton	
Bifrost-Riverton		16.3	10.1	Road 11E – Shorncliffe	PR 326 changes cardinal directions between north–south and east–west; former PR 233 east
Bifrost-Riverton		17.9	11.1	Road 10E – Okno	
Bifrost-Riverton		18.2	11.3	Vidir Airport	Access road into airport
Bifrost-Riverton		20.4	12.7	Pavement ends	
Bifrost-Riverton		22.9	14.2	PR 233 – Arborg, Fisher Branch	Eastern terminus; former PR 226 south; road continues east as Road 138N
1.000 mi = 1.609 km; 1.000 km = 0.621 mi
