= Manitoba Provincial Road 325 =

Provincial Road in Manitoba, Canada

Provincial Road 325
- PR 325 highlighted in red

Route information
- Maintained by Department of Infrastructure
- Length: 129.0 km (80.2 mi)
- Existed: 1966–present

Major junctions
- West end: PTH 68 in Oakview
- PTH 6 in Ashern; PTH 17 in Hodgson
- East end: PR 234 near Washow Bay

Location
- Country: Canada
- Province: Manitoba
- Rural municipalities: West Interlake, Grahamdale, Fisher, Bifrost-Riverton

Highway system
- Provincial highways in Manitoba; Winnipeg City Routes
← PR 324	→ PR 326

Provincial Road 325 (PR 325) is a 129.0-kilometre-long (80.2 mi) east–west highway in the Interlake Region of Manitoba, Canada. It connects the towns of The Narrows, Ashern, Hodgson, and Washow Bay, while also oddly providing a road connection between the Lake Manitoba Narrows and the Lake Winnipeg Narrows.

== Route description ==
PR 325 begins a few kilometres east of The Narrows in the Rural Municipality of West Interlake in the Oakview community, at a junction with PTH 68 (Northern Woods and Water Route). It winds its way northeast along the narrow Isthmus separating Lake Manitoba and Dog Lake for several kilometers before joining a concurrency (overlap) with PTH 6 and heading due north into the town of Ashern, travelling through a business district and neighbourhoods on the west side of town before PR 325 splits and heads due east along the northern border of the town. Leaving Ashern, the pavement transitions to gravel at an intersection with Cook Road and the highway continues on through forested areas and passes through a section of the Rural Municipality of Grahamdale. Entering the Rural Municipality of Fisher, PR 325 travels through farmland as it has an intersection with PR 233 and crosses the Fisher River. Joining a concurrency with PTH 17, it becomes paved once more and the pair head for a short distance before making a sharp curve to the east to pass through the town of Hodgson, where they cross a creek twice. After crossing Bottle Creek, they immediately have a junction with PR 224 near the southern border of the Peguis First Nation, where PTH 17 ends and PR 325 continues east as a gravel road, entering the Municipality of Bifrost-Riverton through a switchback. After passing through remote woodlands, some of which are portions of Moose Creek Provincial Forest, the highway comes to an end near the shores of Lake Winnipeg at an intersection with PR 234, just north of Washow Bay.

== Major intersections ==
Division	Location	km	mi	Destinations	Notes
West Interlake	Oakview	0.0	0.0	PTH 68 (NWWR) – The Narrows, Eriksdale, Ste. Rose du Lac	Western terminus; former PR 235
West Interlake		25.2	15.7	Old 514 (Road 39W)	Former PR 514 south
West Interlake		29.5	18.3	PTH 6 south – Eriksdale	Western end of PTH 6 concurrency
West Interlake	Ashern	31.5	19.6	PTH 6 north – Grand Rapids	Eastern end of PTH 6 concurrency
West Interlake	Ashern	33.2	20.6	Cook Road	Western end of unpaved section
Grahamdale	No major junctions				
Fisher		72.3	44.9	PR 233 south – Fisher Branch	Northern terminus of PR 233
Fisher		76.9	47.8	Bridge over the Fisher River	
Fisher		83.8	52.1	PTH 17 south – Fisher Branch	Western end of PTH 17 concurrency; eastern end of unpaved section
Fisher	Hodgson	88.0	54.7	Bridge over Hodgson Creek	
Fisher	Hodgson	88.5	55.0	Bridge over Hodgson Creek	
Fisher		91.7	57.0	Bridge over Bottle Creek	
Fisher		91.7	57.0	PTH 17 ends PR 224 north – Peguis, Fisher River	Southern terminus of PR 224; northern terminus of PTH 17; western end of unpaved section
Bifrost-Riverton		129.0	80.2	PR 234 – Pine Dock, Riverton	Eastern terminus
1.000 mi = 1.609 km; 1.000 km = 0.621 mi: Concurrency terminus
