= Manitoba Provincial Road 231 =

Provincial road in Manitoba, Canada

Provincial Road 231
- PR 231 highlighted in red

Route information
- Maintained by Department of Infrastructure
- Length: 41.9 km (26.0 mi)
- Existed: 1966–present

Major junctions
- West end: PTH 17 at Narcisse
- PTH 7 at Fraserwood; PTH 8 near Gimli
- East end: PTH 9 / PR 222 in Gimli

Location
- Country: Canada
- Province: Manitoba
- Rural municipalities: Armstrong, Gimli

Highway system
- Provincial highways in Manitoba; Winnipeg City Routes
← PR 230	→ PR 232

Provincial Road 231 (PR 231) is a 41.9-kilometre-long (26.0 mi) east–west highway in the Interlake Region of Manitoba, connecting the hamlets of Narcisse and Fraserwood with Gimli.

== Route description ==
PR 231 begins in the Rural Municipality of Armstrong at an intersection with PTH 17 at the northern edge of Narcisse. After a short distance, the highway curves to head due eastward as a gravel road, passing by the site of the former hamlet of Bender as well as passing just north of Dennis Lake. The highway becomes concurrent (overlapped) with PTH 7 for a short distance, becoming paved, to Fraserwood, where PR 231 splits and becomes the main thoroughfare for the community. PR 231 now heads east through rural woodlands for several kilometres to enter the Rural Municipality of Gimli, immediately entering farmland as it travels past Gimli Motorsports Park and the former RCAF Gimli to have an intersection with PTH 8. The highway now enters the town of Gimli, travelling through some neighbourhoods before coming to an end at an intersection between PTH 9 and PR 222 (both of which are Seventh Avenue), just a few blocks away from both downtown and the beaches of Lake Winnipeg.

== Major intersections ==
Division	Location	km	mi	Destinations	Notes
Armstrong	Narcisse	0.0	0.0	PTH 17 – Fisher Branch, Inwood	Western terminus; western end of unpaved section
Armstrong	Narcisse	1.3	0.81	Road 114N – Narcisse, Bender Historical Site	
Armstrong		5.9	3.7	Road 114N – Bender Historical Site	
Armstrong		22.5	14.0	PTH 7 north – Arborg	Western end of PTH 7 concurrency; eastern end of unpaved section
Armstrong	Fraserwood	24.5	15.2	PTH 7 – Teulon	Eastern end of PTH 7 concurrency
Gimli		40.2	25.0	PTH 8 (Veterans Memorial Highway) – Riverton, Winnipeg	
Gimli	Gimli	41.9	26.0	PTH 9 south / PR 222 north (Seventh Avenue)	Eastern terminus; road continues as N Fifth Avenue towards Lake Winnipeg
1.000 mi = 1.609 km; 1.000 km = 0.621 mi: Concurrency terminus
