= List of historic places in Interlake Region, Manitoba =

List of names of historic places in Manitoba, Canada

This is a list of historic places in Interlake Region, Manitoba entered on the Canadian Register of Historic Places, whether they are federal, provincial, or municipal.

== List of historic places ==
Name	Address	Coordinates	Government recognition (CRHP №)	Wikidata ID	Image
Gull Harbour (1898) Lighthouse	Eastern tip of Gull Harbour on Hecla Island; Hecla-Grindstone Provincial Park MB	51°11′34″N 96°36′16″W	Federal (21060)		
Gull Harbour (1926) Lighthouse	Eastern tip of Gull Harbour on Hecla Island; Hecla-Grindstone Provincial Park MB	51°11′34″N 96°36′14″W	Federal (21061)		Upload Photo
Ukrainian Catholic Church of the Blessed Virgin Mary	NW 16-18-2 EPM; Armstrong MB	50°32′56″N 97°16′26″W	Armstrong municipality (3532)		Upload Photo
St. Andrews Caméré Curtain Bridge Dam National Historic Site of Canada	St. Andrews Rapids, Red River / Highway #44; Lockport MB	50°04′59″N 96°56′40″W	Federal (4441)		More images
Administration Building A1	Highway 7 & Highway 31; Stony Mountain MB	50°04′41″N 97°13′16″W	Federal (1193)		
Balfour House	Woodlands MB	50°09′19″N 97°33′09″W	Woodlands municipality (6163)		Upload Photo
Erinside School and Teacherage	Woodlands MB	50°22′27″N 97°29′05″W	Woodlands municipality (6173)		Upload Photo
Robertson House	Woodlands MB	50°04′31″N 97°47′55″W	Woodlands municipality (4880)		Upload Photo
Eriksdale Creamery	Station Lane at Main Street; Eriksdale MB	50°51′45″N 98°06′20″W	Eriksdale municipality (4146)		Upload Photo
Peace Lutheran Church	First Avenue & PR #419; Armstrong MB	50°47′04″N 97°34′24″W	Armstrong municipality (5922)		Upload Photo
Lily Bay United Church	Coldwell MB	50°43′48″N 98°13′39″W	Coldwell municipality (5988)		Upload Photo
Stony Hill-Otto Lutheran Church	Coldwell MB	50°41′02″N 97°52′44″W	Coldwell municipality (5989)		Upload Photo
Buztynski House	Railway Avenue; Grahamdale MB	51°17′20″N 98°25′51″W	Grahamdale municipality (5990)		Upload Photo
Canadian National Railway Station	Railway Avenue and 1 Street, Moosehorn; Grahamdale MB	51°17′34″N 98°25′25″W	Grahamdale municipality (20208)		Upload Photo
Little Steep Rock Cliffs	Steep Rock Beach Park, nw of Grahamdale; Grahamdale MB	51°27′38″N 98°46′34″W	Grahamdale municipality (19925)		
Masonic Hall	Railway Avenue and 1 Street, Moosehorn; Grahamdale MB	51°17′34″N 98°25′24″W	Grahamdale municipality (19382)		Upload Photo
St. Paul's Evangelical Lutheran Church	New Home Road and Little Mud Lake Road; Grahamdale MB	51°15′31″N 98°26′39″W	Grahamdale municipality (6007)		Upload Photo
Steep Rock Cliffs	Steep Rock, nw of Grahamdale; Grahamdale MB	51°26′33″N 98°48′20″W	Grahamdale municipality (19926)		Upload Photo
St. Michael's of Archangels Roman Catholic Church	Armstrong MB	50°43′42″N 97°13′10″W	Armstrong municipality (6097)		Upload Photo
Hilbre School	Hilbre School Road and Dillabough Road; Grahamdale MB	51°30′26″N 98°35′07″W	Grahamdale municipality (6098)		Upload Photo
Holy Cross Greek Catholic Church	Armstrong MB	50°31′15″N 97°22′06″W	Armstrong municipality (8690)		Upload Photo
St. Helen's Anglican Church	Grahamdale MB	51°35′54″N 98°41′43″W	Grahamdale municipality (9440)		Upload Photo
Oak Point Quarry - Notre Dame Heritage Park	Coldwell MB	50°30′24″N 98°10′27″W	Coldwell municipality (14521)		Upload Photo
St. Peter's Dynevor Anglican Church Rectory	1147 Breezy Point Road; Selkirk MB	50°11′00″N 96°50′41″W	Manitoba (8750)		Upload Photo
Stuart House	478 Eveline Street; Selkirk MB	50°08′07″N 96°52′49″W	Selkirk municipality (3312)		Upload Photo
Colcleugh House	102 Pacific Avenue; Selkirk MB	50°08′16″N 96°52′29″W	Manitoba (3972)		Upload Photo
Lower Fort Garry National Historic Site of Canada	Highway 9 Selkirk MB	50°06′35″N 96°56′06″W	Federal (4224)		More images
Traders Bank Building	389-391 Eveline Street; Selkirk MB	50°08′38″N 96°52′08″W	Selkirk municipality (5012)		Upload Photo
Selkirk Dominion Post Office and Customs Building	406 Main Street; Selkirk MB	50°08′39″N 96°52′23″W	Manitoba (5481)		Upload Photo
Warehouse	Highway 9, Lower Fort Garry; Selkirk MB	50°06′44″N 96°55′52″W	Federal (3654)		
Southwest Bastion	Highway 9, Lower Fort Garry; Selkirk MB	50°06′43″N 96°55′59″W	Federal (4774)		
Men's House	Highway 9, Lower Fort Garry; Selkirk MB	50°06′45″N 96°55′56″W	Federal (4792)		
The Big House	Highway 9, Lower Fort Garry; Selkirk MB	50°06′44″N 96°55′54″W	Federal (11339)		More images
Furloft and Saleshop	Highway 9, Lower Fort Garry; Selkirk MB	50°06′42″N 96°55′54″W	Federal (14666)		
Museum	Highway 9, Lower Fort Garry; Selkirk MB	50°06′42″N 96°55′56″W	Federal (19620)		
H.P. Tergesen and Sons General Merchant	82 1st Avenue; Gimli MB	50°37′54″N 96°59′12″W	Manitoba (13432)		
H.P. Tergesen & Sons General Merchant	82 1st Avenue; Gimli MB	50°37′54″N 96°59′12″W	Manitoba (2581)		
Stonewall Town Hall	293 Main Street; Stonewall MB	50°08′10″N 97°19′36″W	Stonewall municipality (3212)		Upload Photo
Rockwood Registry Office	283 2nd Avenue North Box 1205; Stonewall MB	50°08′15″N 97°19′20″W	Stonewall municipality (19931)		Upload Photo
Arnes Pioneer Lutheran Church	Arnes Road; Gimli MB	50°48′08″N 96°59′36″W	Gimli municipality (19385)		Upload Photo
Davidson-Wigg Cottage	47 North Lake Street; Gimli MB	50°38′37″N 96°58′54″W	Gimli municipality (19928)		Upload Photo
Gimli Public School	62 2nd Street; Gimli MB	50°38′04″N 96°59′17″W	Gimli municipality (3213)		
Goodman-Wolstencroft Cottage	13 2nd Avenue; Gimli MB	50°38′19″N 96°59′14″W	Gimli municipality (19924)		Upload Photo
Maryville Cottage	12 6th Avenue; Gimli MB	50°38′20″N 96°59′36″W	Gimli municipality (19929)		Upload Photo
Thorson Cottage	50 4th Avenue; Gimli MB	50°38′07″N 96°59′25″W	Gimli municipality (19927)		Upload Photo
Arborg CPR Station	292 Main Street; Arborg MB	50°54′29″N 97°12′55″W	Arborg municipality (3219)		
Fjelsted House	210 Main Street; Arborg MB	50°54′19″N 97°13′01″W	Arborg municipality (3325)		Upload Photo
Dr. Hunter House	Green Acres Park; Teulon MB	50°22′41″N 97°15′43″W	Teulon municipality (3352)		Upload Photo
Gimli Unitarian Church	72 2nd Avenue; Gimli MB	50°37′55″N 96°59′18″W	Gimli municipality (3557)		
Jonasson House	48 3rd Avenue; Gimli MB	50°38′08″N 96°59′22″W	Gimli municipality (3558)		Upload Photo
Gimli Dance Pavilion	Gimli Park; Gimli MB	50°38′37″N 96°59′31″W	Gimli municipality (3559)		Upload Photo
Nordin Farmstead	NE 28-16-1 E Teulon MB	50°24′09″N 97°23′36″W	Teulon municipality (3996)		Upload Photo
Langtry Fox Farm Tower	135 Sturgeon Road; Stonewall MB	50°08′07″N 97°16′25″W	Stonewall municipality (4262)		Upload Photo
Orange Clark House	214 Second Street West; Stonewall MB	50°08′04″N 97°19′47″W	Stonewall municipality (4606)		Upload Photo
St. Michael's Ukrainian Catholic Church	Gimli MB	50°34′50″N 97°05′52″W	Gimli municipality (5332)		Upload Photo
Johann Magnus Bjarnason Monument	Arborg MB	50°54′18″N 97°07′11″W	Arborg municipality (6583)		Upload Photo
Arborg Unitarian Church	242 Ingolfs Street; Arborg MB	50°54′26″N 97°12′55″W	Arborg municipality (6588)		Upload Photo
St. Mary's Ukrainian Catholic Church	Gimli MB	50°40′14″N 97°02′25″W	Gimli municipality (6640)		Upload Photo
All Saints Victoria Anglican Church	Stonewall MB	50°11′48″N 97°15′31″W	Manitoba (6643)		Upload Photo
All Saints Anglican Church	Teulon MB	50°23′21″N 97°34′34″W	Teulon municipality (6672)		Upload Photo
Sts. Cyril and Methodius Roman Catholic Church	Gimli MB	50°38′16″N 97°05′18″W	Gimli municipality (6711)		Upload Photo
Winnipeg Beach Canadian Pacific Railway Water Tower	Stephenson's Point; Winnipeg Beach MB	50°29′47″N 96°57′47″W	Manitoba (6815)		More images
Icelandic Pioneer Cemetery	Highway 9 and PR 231; Gimli MB	50°39′05″N 96°58′49″W	Gimli municipality (8504)		Upload Photo
Grahame House	40 Second Street SE; Teulon MB	50°22′57″N 97°15′27″W	Teulon municipality (8720)		Upload Photo
St. Demetrius Ukrainian Catholic Church	Arborg MB	50°58′09″N 97°13′26″W	Arborg municipality (6260)		Upload Photo
Betsey Ramsay's Grave	Riverton MB	50°58′11″N 96°56′10″W	Riverton municipality (6581)		Upload Photo
Ledwyn Pioneer Park	Provincial Route 329, 10km west of Riverton; Riverton MB	50°59′39″N 97°07′58″W	Riverton municipality (6584)		Upload Photo
Stonewall Dominion Post Office	357 Main Street; Stonewall MB	50°08′N 96°53′W	Manitoba (3488)		
Fisher Branch Canadian National Railway Station	Railway Avenue; Fisher MB	51°05′03″N 97°37′20″W	Fisher municipality (5923)		Upload Photo
Holy Trinity Ukrainian Greek Orthodox Church	19 High Plains Road; Fisher MB	50°53′24″N 97°36′19″W	Fisher municipality (6752)		Upload Photo
St. Nicholas Ukrainian Catholic Church	44 High Plains Road; Fisher MB	50°53′23″N 97°36′39″W	Fisher municipality (6162)		Upload Photo
Brant Consolidated School	Government Road Allowance; Rockwood MB	50°10′58″N 97°26′54″W	Manitoba (3486)		Upload Photo
Ridgeway House and Gunton Waiting Station	Rockwood MB	50°03′47″N 97°26′38″W	Rockwood municipality (8802)		
MacKenzie Presbyterian Church	St. Clements MB	50°08′14″N 96°50′03″W	St. Clements municipality (4252)		Upload Photo
St. Peter, Dynevor Old Stone Church	River Lot 212, 8 Stone Church Road; St. Clements MB	50°10′59″N 96°50′21″W	Manitoba (6940)		
Bunn House	RL 97 Bunn's Road; St. Clements MB	50°07′29″N 96°53′21″W	Manitoba (5387)		Upload Photo
Firth House	546 River Road; St. Andrews MB	50°04′35″N 96°57′04″W	Manitoba (8671)		Upload Photo
Little Britain United Church	5879 PTH No. 9 St. Andrews MB	50°06′10″N 96°56′23″W	Manitoba (6646)		Upload Photo
Cox House	7348 Henderson Highway; St. Andrews MB	50°03′39″N 96°53′32″W	Manitoba (8053)		Upload Photo
Summerscales House	1168 River Road; St. Andrews MB	50°07′N 96°55′W	St. Andrews municipality (3368)		Upload Photo
St. Andrew's Anglican Church National Historic Site of Canada	3 St. Andrews Road; St. Andrews MB	50°04′02″N 96°58′38″W	Federal (4440), Manitoba (5389)		More images
Captain William Kennedy House	417 River Road; St. Andrews MB	50°03′57″N 96°58′07″W	Manitoba (5442)		Upload Photo
St. Andrew's Rectory National Historic Site of Canada	374 River Road and St. Andrew's Road; St. Andrews MB	50°03′56″N 96°58′51″W	Federal (11805)		Upload Photo
Miss Davis' School Residence / Twin Oaks National Historic Site of Canada	River Road, Lot 51; St. Andrews MB	50°04′02″N 96°58′38″W	Federal (12704)		Upload Photo
St. Laurent Town Hall	436 Veterans Memorial Road; St. Laurent MB	50°24′34″N 97°56′27″W	St. Laurent municipality (9403)		Upload Photo
West St. Paul Municipal Hall	3550 Main Street; West St. Paul MB	49°59′01″N 97°03′51″W	West St. Paul municipality (4605)		

== See also ==
- List of historic places in Manitoba
- List of National Historic Sites of Canada in Manitoba
