= Manitoba Highway 68 =

Provincial highway in Manitoba, Canada

Provincial Trunk Highway 68
- Northern Woods and Water Route
- PTH 68 highlighted in red

Route information
- Maintained by Manitoba Infrastructure
- Length: 220 km (140 mi)
- Existed: 1952–present

Major junctions
- West end: PTH 5 at Ste. Rose Du Lac
- PTH 6 at Eriksdale; PTH 17 at Poplarfield; PTH 7 at Arborg
- East end: PTH 8 south of Riverton

Location
- Country: Canada
- Province: Manitoba
- Rural municipalities: Alonsa; Armstrong; Bifrost – Riverton; Fisher; Ste. Rose; West Interlake
- Towns: Arborg

Highway system
- Provincial highways in Manitoba; Winnipeg City Routes
← PTH 67	→ PTH 75

Provincial Trunk Highway 68 (PTH 68) is an east–west provincial highway in the Parkland and Interlake regions of Manitoba, Canada.

PTH 68 starts at PTH 5 east of Ste. Rose Du Lac and terminates at PTH 8 11 kilometres (6.8 miles) south of Riverton. Between the eastern junction with PTH 6 at Eriksdale and its western terminus, the highway is part of the Northern Woods and Water Route. The most notable portion of PTH 68 is the bridge over Lake Manitoba at The Narrows.

== History ==
PTH 68 first appeared on the 1952 Manitoba Highway Map. Originally, the highway served as an east-west connector route within the Interlake region between PTH 8 and PTH 6 at Eriksdale.

In 1987, the highway was extended to its current westbound terminus, replacing PR 235 between Ste. Rose Du Lac and PTH 6.

== Major intersections ==
Division	Location	km	mi	Destinations	Notes
Ste. Rose	Ste. Rose du Lac	0.0	0.0	PTH 5 (Parks Route / NWWR west) – Dauphin, Neepawa	Western terminus; NWWR follows PTH 5 west
Ste. Rose		8.4	5.2	Ste. Amelie Road – Ste. Amelie	Former PR 360 south
Alonsa		23.1	14.4	PR 278 south – Amaranth	
Alonsa	Eddystone	30.9	19.2	PR 481 north – Crane River	former PTH 68 east
↑ / ↓	The Narrows	68.4	42.5	Crosses Lake Manitoba	
West Interlake		79.3	49.3	PR 325 north – Ashern	
West Interlake		103.9	64.6	Old 514	Former PR 514 north
West Interlake		114.2	71.0	Old 418	Former PR 418 south
West Interlake		126.8	78.8	PTH 6 north – Ashern, Thompson, Grand Rapids	Western end of PTH 6 concurrency
West Interlake	Eriksdale	137.4	85.4	PTH 6 south (NWWR east) – Warren, Winnipeg; PR 417 west – Dog Creek I.R.	Eastern end of PTH 6 concurrency; NWWR follows PTH 6 south
Armstrong	No major junctions				
Fisher		155.4	96.6	PR 512 south – Chatfield	
Fisher	Poplarfield	175.9	109.3	PTH 17 – Fisher Branch, Teulon	
Bifrost-Riverton		198.4	123.3	PR 233 north – Vidir	
Town of Arborg		203.4	126.4	PTH 7 south – Teulon, Winnipeg	
Town of Arborg		204.0	126.8	PR 326 north (Main Street)	
Bifrost-Riverton		218.2	135.6	PTH 8 (Veterans Memorial Highway) – Riverton, Gimli, Winnipeg; Road 129N to PR 222 – Hnausa	
1.000 mi = 1.609 km; 1.000 km = 0.621 mi: Concurrency terminus

== Related route ==
Provincial Road 512
- Location: Rural Municipality of Fisher - Rural Municipality of Armstrong
- Length: 15.4 km (9.6 mi)
- Existed: 1966–present

Provincial Road 512 (PR 512) is a 15.4-kilometre-long (9.6 mi) north–south spur of PTH 68 located mostly within the Rural Municipality of Armstrong, providing access to the hamlet of Chatfield via a short section of PR 419. It is entirely a two-lane gravel road, winding its way through a mix of rural farmland and wooded areas while travelling past several small lakes.

Division	Location	km	mi	Destinations	Notes
Armstrong		0.0	0.0	PR 419 – Chatfield, Lundar	Southern terminus
Fisher		15.4	9.6	PTH 68 – Eriksdale, Poplarfield	Northern terminus
1.000 mi = 1.609 km; 1.000 km = 0.621 mi
