= Zbaraz, Manitoba =

Zbaraz
- Location of Zbaraz in Manitoba
- Coordinates: 50°59′40″N 97°29′8″W
- Country: Canada
- Province: Manitoba
- Region: Interlake
- Census Division: No. 18

Government
  - Governing Body: Rural Municipality of Fisher Council
  - MP: James Bezan
  - MLA: Derek Johnson
- Time zone: UTC−6 (CST)
  - Summer (DST): UTC−5 (CDT)
- Area codes: 204, 431
- NTS Map: 062I14
- GNBC Code: GBEUP

Zbaraz is a locality within the Rural Municipality of Fisher in the Interlake Region of central Manitoba, Canada. It is located approximately 126 kilometres (78 mi) north-west of Winnipeg, along Provincial Road 329 between Broad Valley and Morweena.
