= Rae Bridgman =

Canadian anthropologist, author and urban planner

- Occupations: Author, Illustrator, Anthropologist, Urban Planner
- Writing career
- Genres: Children's and Young Adult Literature, Scholarly Books

Rae St. Clair Bridgman is a Canadian anthropologist, urban planner, university professor, writer, and illustrator. She is known for her picture books, middle-grade books, and young adult books, most notably The MiddleGate Books, a series of fantasy books for kids inspired by the Narcisse Snake Pits of Narcisse, Manitoba. The books feature the adventures of young cousins Wil and Sophie who live in the secret, magical city of MiddleGate, beset by the return of an ancient secret society known as the Serpent's Chain. Her academic research focuses on child-friendly cities and homelessness in Canada.

== Background ==
Bridgman was born in Toronto, and now lives in Winnipeg, Manitoba. Bridgman received her Bachelor of Arts degree (Latin) and her Bachelor of Music from the University of Toronto, and her Master's (Interdisciplinary Studies) and PhD (Anthropology) from York University. She holds the position of Professor in the Department of City Planning at the University of Manitoba in the Faculty of Architecture, and is co-director of BridgmanCollaborative Architecture, a Winnipeg design firm.

Bridgman illustrates her fantasy novels with distinctive pen-and-ink and pan pastel drawings.

In 2024, her young children's book, Good Night, Good Night, Victoria Beach won the Independent Book Publishing Professionals Group's Next Generation Indie Book Awards Grand Prize for fiction and for children's picture book, ages 0 to 5.

== Works ==
Middle-Grade and Young Adult Fantasy Fiction:

- The Serpent's Spell. FriesenPress 2021. (New and revised edition. Originally published by Great Plains Publications, 2006.)
- Amber Ambrosia. FriesenPress 2021. (New and revised edition. Originally published by Great Plains Publications, 2007.)
- Fish and Sphinx. FriesenPress 2021. (New and revised edition. Originally published by Great Plains Publications, 2008.)
- Kingdom of Trolls. FriesenPress 2023. (New and revised edition. Originally published by Sybertooth, 2011.)
