= Hnausa Beach Provincial Park =

Provincial park in Manitoba, Canada

- Location within Manitoba
- Interactive map of Hnausa Beach Provincial Park
- Location: Interlake Region, Manitoba
- Nearest city: Gimli, Manitoba
- Coordinates: 50°54′1″N 96°59′32″W
- Area: 10 ha (25 acres)
- Created: 1961

Hnausa Beach Provincial Park is a provincial park in Manitoba, Canada, on the west shore of Lake Winnipeg north of Gimli, Manitoba. The beach within the park is named after the nearby community of Hnausa. Hnausa is an Old Icelandic word for a piece of turf. This part of Manitoba is known as New Iceland due to the significant Icelandic settlement of the area that began in 1875.

In the first quarter of the twentieth century, railway companies became involved in the promotion of travel by rail to the beaches of Lake Winnipeg. The railway reached Riverton in 1914, opening the area around Hnausa to day travel from Winnipeg.

The Rural Municipality of Bifrost purchased the land on which the current park stands to be a community park in 1930. The Hnausa portion of the Manitoba Icelandic festival was held at the park before Gimli became the sole location of the festival activities. Ownership of the land was passed to the province in 1959 and it was declared a provincial park in 1961. It is 10 ha (25 acres) in size.

The park is located within the Gimli ecodistrict of the Interlake Plain ecoregion part of the Boreal Plains ecozone.

== See also ==
- List of protected areas of Manitoba
- List of provincial parks in Manitoba
