= Riverton Collegiate Institute =

High school in Manitoba, Canada

Coordinates: 50°59′35″N 97°00′08″W

- Riverton, Manitoba; Canada

Information
- School type: High school
- Established: 1961; 65 years ago
- School district: Evergreen School Division
- Grades: 9-12
- Enrollment: 106 (2025)
- Language: English; French

Riverton Collegiate Institute (or RCI) is a high school located in Riverton, Manitoba in the Rural Municipality of Bifrost in the Interlake Region, Manitoba.

== School structure ==
As of 2025, Riverton Collegiate has an enrollment of 106 students from Grade 9 to Grade 12 and is part of Evergreen School Division.

The school enjoys a close working relationship with all of these communities, including partners from Southeast Tribal Counci, Bloodvein First Nation, Berens River First Nation, Poplar River First Nation, Frontier School Division. Sapotaweyak Cree Nation (Pelican Rapids, and Kinonjeoshtegon First Nation (Jackhead).

== History ==
The school was established in 1961.

In 2009, Riverton Collegiate began a band program and choral choir.
