= Narcisse Snake Dens =

Wildlife management area in Manitoba, Canada

Coordinates: 50°44′2.05″N 97°31′45.57″W

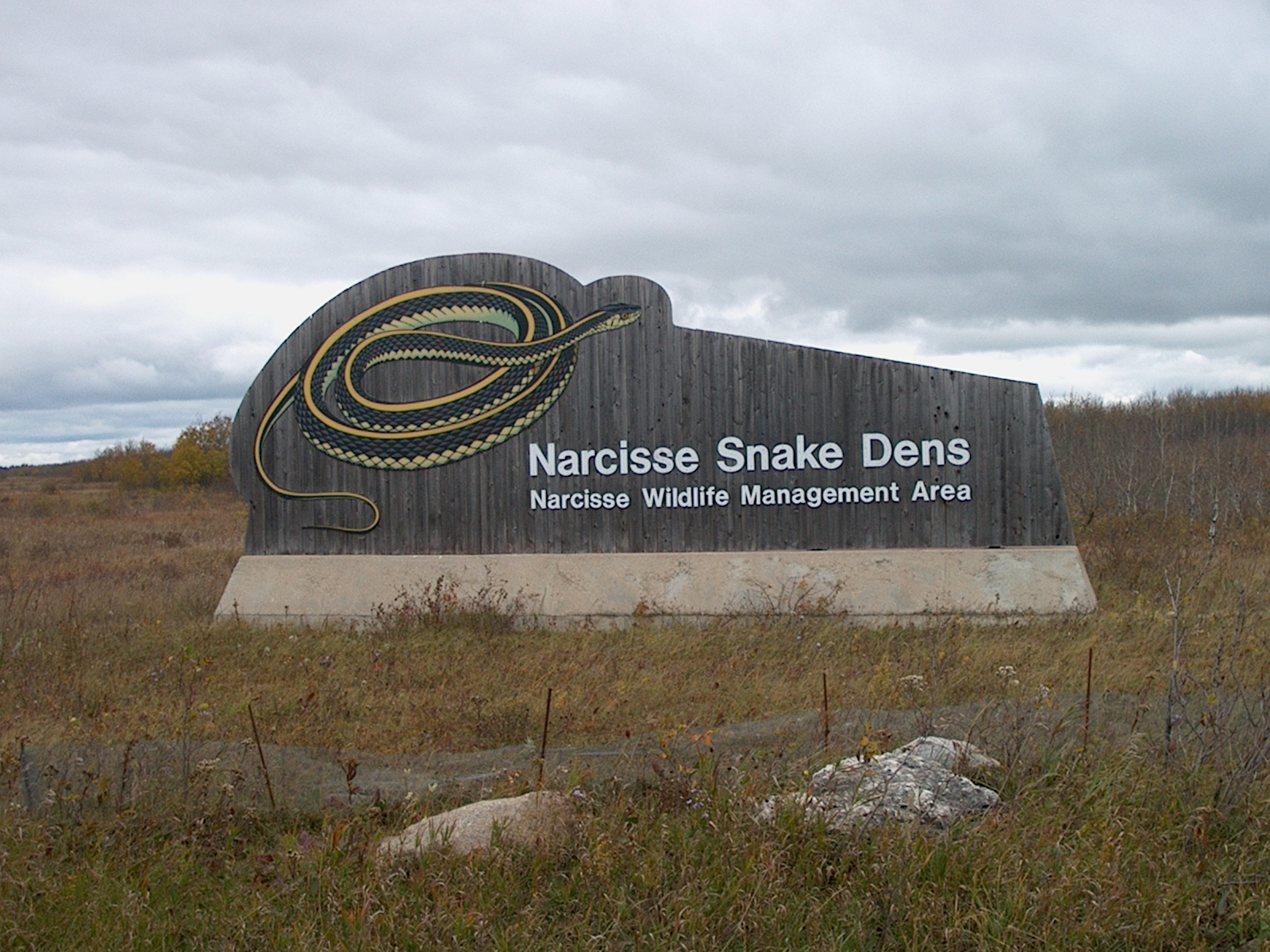
Narcisse Snake Dens welcome sign

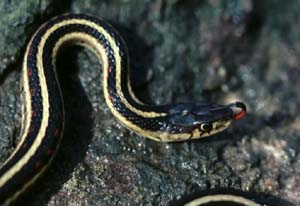
A red-sided garter snake

The Narcisse Snake Dens are a provincial wildlife management area located in the Rural Municipality of Armstrong about 6 km (3.7 mi) north of Narcisse, in the Canadian province of Manitoba. The dens are the winter home of tens of thousands of red-sided garter snakes (Thamnophis sirtalis parietalis). These pits are known to house the largest concentration of this particular type of snake in the world. Their winter dens are caverns formed by the area's water-worn limestone bedrock. In the spring, they come up from their dens to the snake pits, where they mate, then they disperse into the nearby marshes for the summer.

== Conservation ==
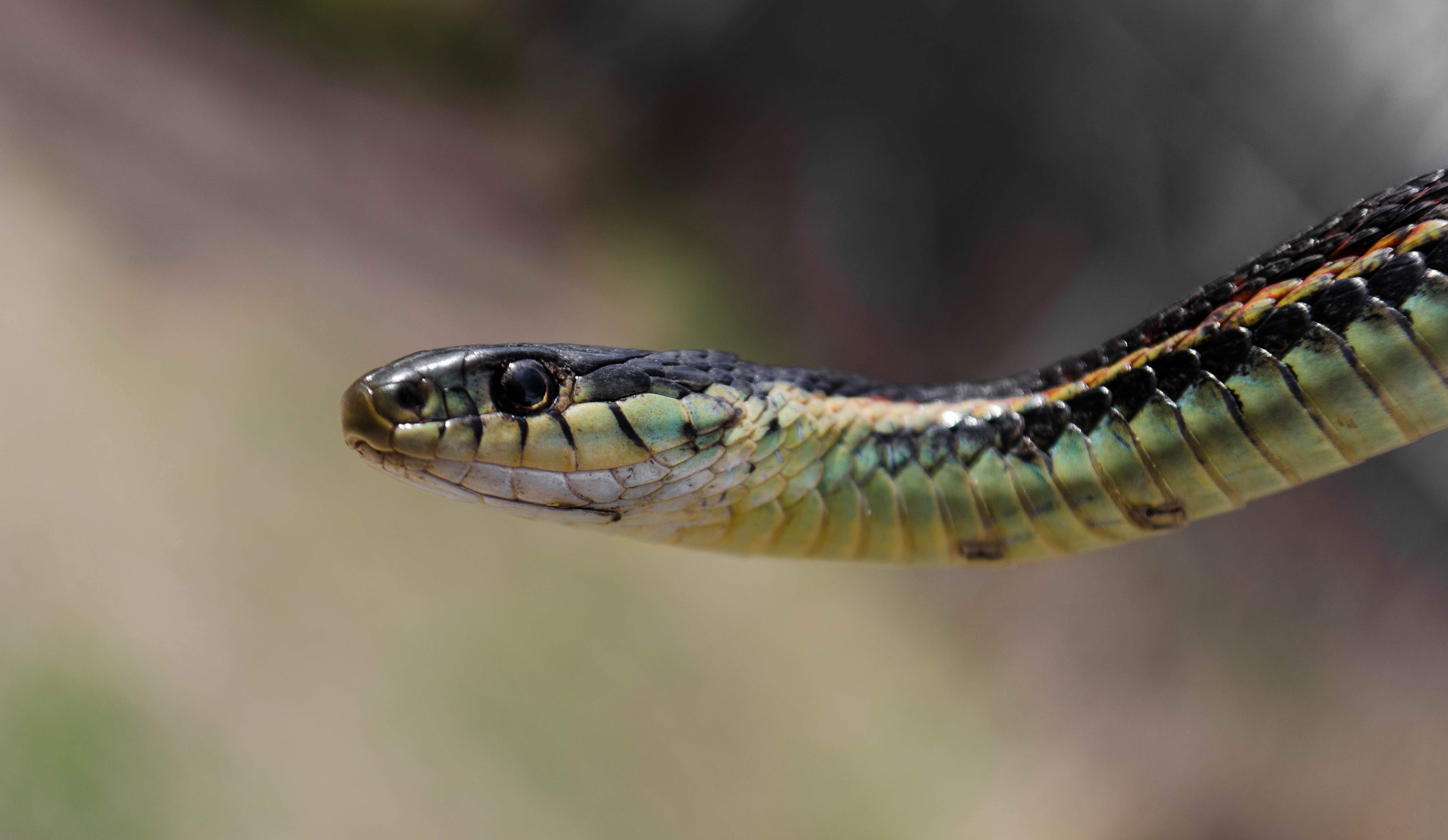
Close up of a red-sided garter snake

The population of red-sided garter snakes around Narcisse was roughly 70,000 until terrible weather in 1999 killed tens of thousands of them before they could reach their winter dens. This tragedy triggered concern about the snakes' biannual migratory path, which cuts right across Highway 17. Every year, 10,000 snakes which try to get to or from their winter dens had been crushed under the wheels of vehicles. This had not been a problem before, because the vast population compensated for the losses. But after the winter of 1999, the population of garter snakes became dangerously low, causing Manitoba Hydro and volunteers to intervene.

Foot-high snow fences were built to force snakes into six-inch (15-cm) tunnels that went under Highway 17. Since some snakes still managed to squeeze under the fence and onto the road, signs were put up during the migratory season urging motorists to slow down to avoid accidentally driving over snakes. These measures worked, and now fewer than 1000 snakes per season are killed on the highway.

By 2024, the snake populations had mostly rebounded, with the number of snakes varying annually from 75,000–150,000.

== Visiting ==
The conservation area is open to the public. The snakes are most active during the spring and fall, in late April to early May, which is the mating season, and also in early September, when the snakes slither back down to their winter dens.

== See also ==
- Rae Bridgman (author of The MiddleGate Books, which feature the snakes of Narcisse, Manitoba)
