= Hodgson, Manitoba =

Hodgson
- community
- Location of Hodgson in Manitoba
- Coordinates: 51.125°N 97.341°W
- Country: Canada
- Province: Manitoba
- Region: Manitoba
- Census division: 18
- Rural Municipality: R.M. of Fisher
- Time zone: UTC-6 (CST)
  - Summer (DST): UTC-5 (CDT)
- Postal code: R0C 1N0
- Area code: 204
- Highways: Highway 325

Hodgson is a community in the Rural Municipality of Fisher in the Canadian province of Manitoba.

It is located on Highways 17 and 325 in the Interlake Region of the province.

== Climate ==
Climate data for Hodgson
Month	Jan	Feb	Mar	Apr	May	Jun	Jul	Aug	Sep	Oct	Nov	Dec	Year
Record high °C (°F)	8.3 (46.9)	11 (52)	16.1 (61.0)	34 (93)	38 (100)	37 (99)	36.1 (97.0)	36 (97)	36 (97)	30 (86)	20.6 (69.1)	9 (48)	38 (100)
Mean daily maximum °C (°F)	−13.8 (7.2)	−9 (16)	−1.5 (29.3)	9 (48)	17.7 (63.9)	22.3 (72.1)	24.9 (76.8)	23.9 (75.0)	17.1 (62.8)	9.5 (49.1)	−2 (28)	−10.8 (12.6)	7.3 (45.1)
Daily mean °C (°F)	−20.1 (−4.2)	−15.7 (3.7)	−8.3 (17.1)	2.1 (35.8)	10 (50)	15.2 (59.4)	17.8 (64.0)	16.4 (61.5)	10.3 (50.5)	3.7 (38.7)	−6.8 (19.8)	−16.6 (2.1)	0.7 (33.3)
Mean daily minimum °C (°F)	−26.5 (−15.7)	−22.3 (−8.1)	−15 (5)	−4.9 (23.2)	2.4 (36.3)	8 (46)	10.6 (51.1)	8.9 (48.0)	3.4 (38.1)	−2.1 (28.2)	−11.6 (11.1)	−22.3 (−8.1)	−5.9 (21.4)
Record low °C (°F)	−45 (−49)	−45.6 (−50.1)	−40 (−40)	−32 (−26)	−13 (9)	−5 (23)	−0.5 (31.1)	−4 (25)	−7.2 (19.0)	−20 (−4)	−39 (−38)	−42 (−44)	−45.6 (−50.1)
Average precipitation mm (inches)	34.8 (1.37)	23.9 (0.94)	33.2 (1.31)	32.5 (1.28)	55.1 (2.17)	84.8 (3.34)	67.2 (2.65)	75.7 (2.98)	64.6 (2.54)	42.3 (1.67)	34.5 (1.36)	35.6 (1.40)	585.1 (23.04)
Source: Environment Canada
