= Manitoba Provincial Road 235 =

Former provincial road in Manitoba, Canada

Provincial Road 235

Route information
- Maintained by Department of Infrastructure
- Length: 129 km (80 mi)
- Existed: 1966–1987

Major junctions
- West end: PTH 5 at Ste. Rose Du Lac
- PR 325
- East end: PTH 6 near Mulvhill

Location
- Country: Canada
- Province: Manitoba
- Rural municipalities: Alonsa; Eriksdale; Siglunes; Ste. Rose
- Towns: Sainte Rose du Lac

Highway system
- Provincial highways in Manitoba; Winnipeg City Routes
← PR 234	→ PR 236

Provincial Road 235 (PR 235) is a former provincial road in the Canadian province of Manitoba.

== Route description ==
PR 235 connected PTH 5 at the eastern edge of Ste. Rose Du Lac to PTH 6 near the community of Mulvhill. The most notable portion of PR 235 was the bridge over Lake Manitoba at The Narrows.

For a more detailed description of the route, please refer to the Travel Route section for PTH 68.

== History ==
PR 235 was decommissioned in its entirety when PTH 68 was extended to its current westbound terminus in 1987.
