= Bender Hamlet, Manitoba =

Coordinates: 50°41′31″N 97°31′15″W

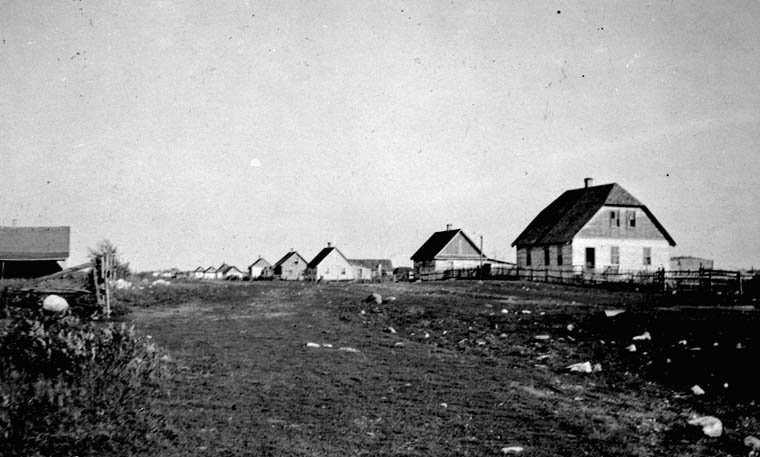
Jewish farmhouses in Bender Hamlet, Manitoba, 1921.

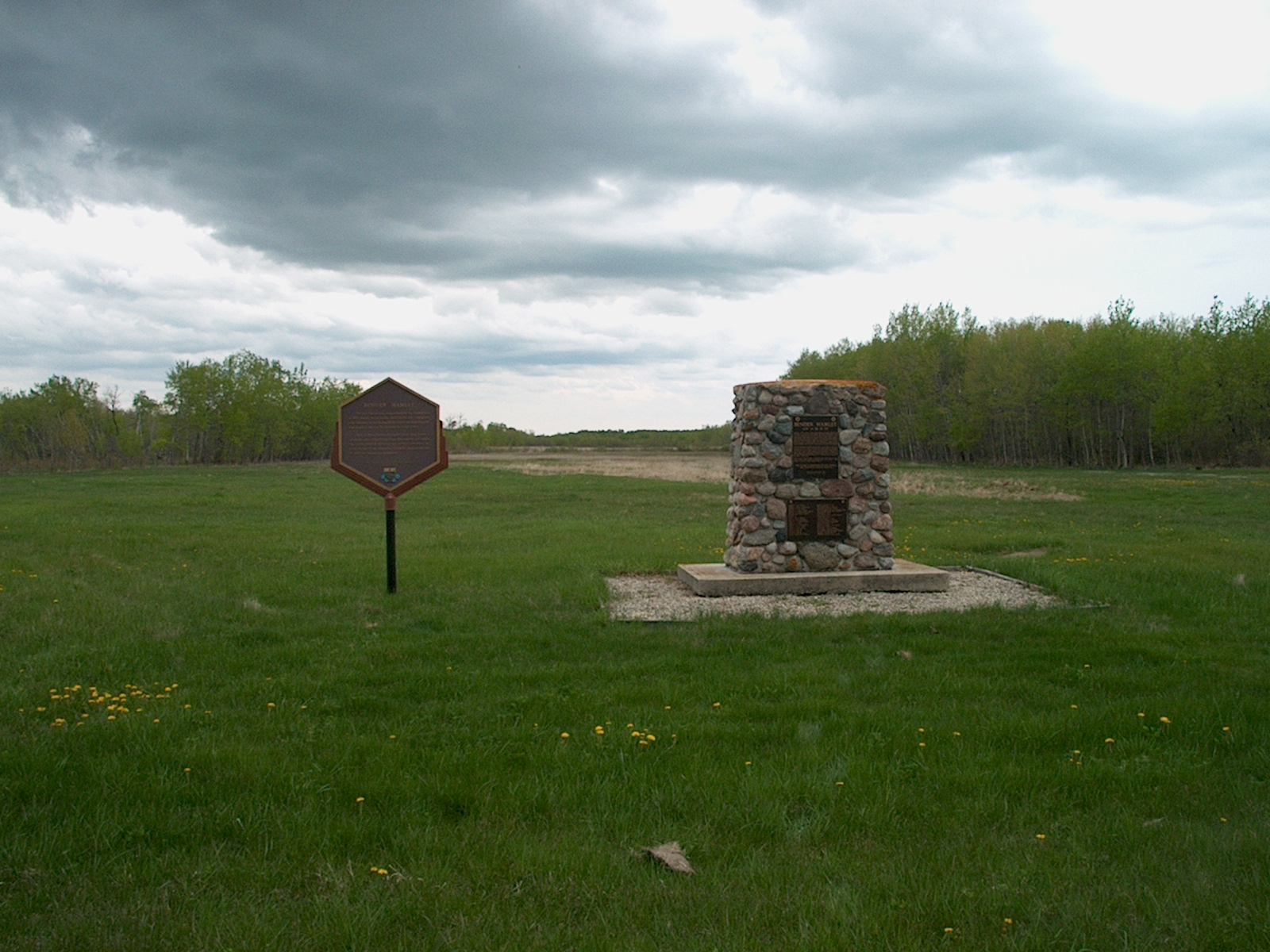
Commemorative Plaques at site of the old Bender Hamlet in Narcisse, Manitoba (2009).

Bender Hamlet, Manitoba was a Baron Maurice de Hirsch sponsored Jewish farm colony in the Rural Municipality of Armstrong, part of the Interlake region in the province of Manitoba. The centre of the settlement was located at quarter section North West 36Township 19, Range 1 west of the Principal Meridian (NW36-19-1W).

Bender Hamlet was originally settled in 1903 and was named after Jacob Bender, a land speculator who recruited settlers from Europe, but who himself never actually lived in the settlement.

The settlement was set up shtetl-style, where all the houses of the families were placed together in the centre of the settlement, in a row along the south side of the colonization road. This was similar to the village orientation experienced by the settlers in Europe.

In 1912 the now defunct Canadian Northern Railway arrived 2 km west of the hamlet. The last of the hamlet's settlers left in November 1926, effectively ending the colony.

A Manitoba Heritage Council commemorative plaque was installed at the site of the former Bender Hamlet in 1987.

== See also ==
- Baron Maurice de Hirsch
- Jewish Colonization Association
- Narcisse, Manitoba
