= Unorganized East Division No. 18, Manitoba =

Unorganized area in Manitoba, Canada

Unorganized East Division No. 18 is an unorganized area in central Manitoba around Lake Manitoba. It has a population of 156 (as of 2016) and an area of 483.97 km^{2}.
