= Okno, Manitoba =

Coordinates: 51°03′23″N 97°13′30″W

Okno is a small community located in the Municipality of Bifrost-Riverton, 16 km north of Arborg, Manitoba Canada.

Historically settled by Icelandic and Ukrainian settlers, since the 1970s the area has increasingly been settled by Mennonites. It is home to the Interlake Mennonite Fellowship Church and the Interlake Mennonite Fellowship School.

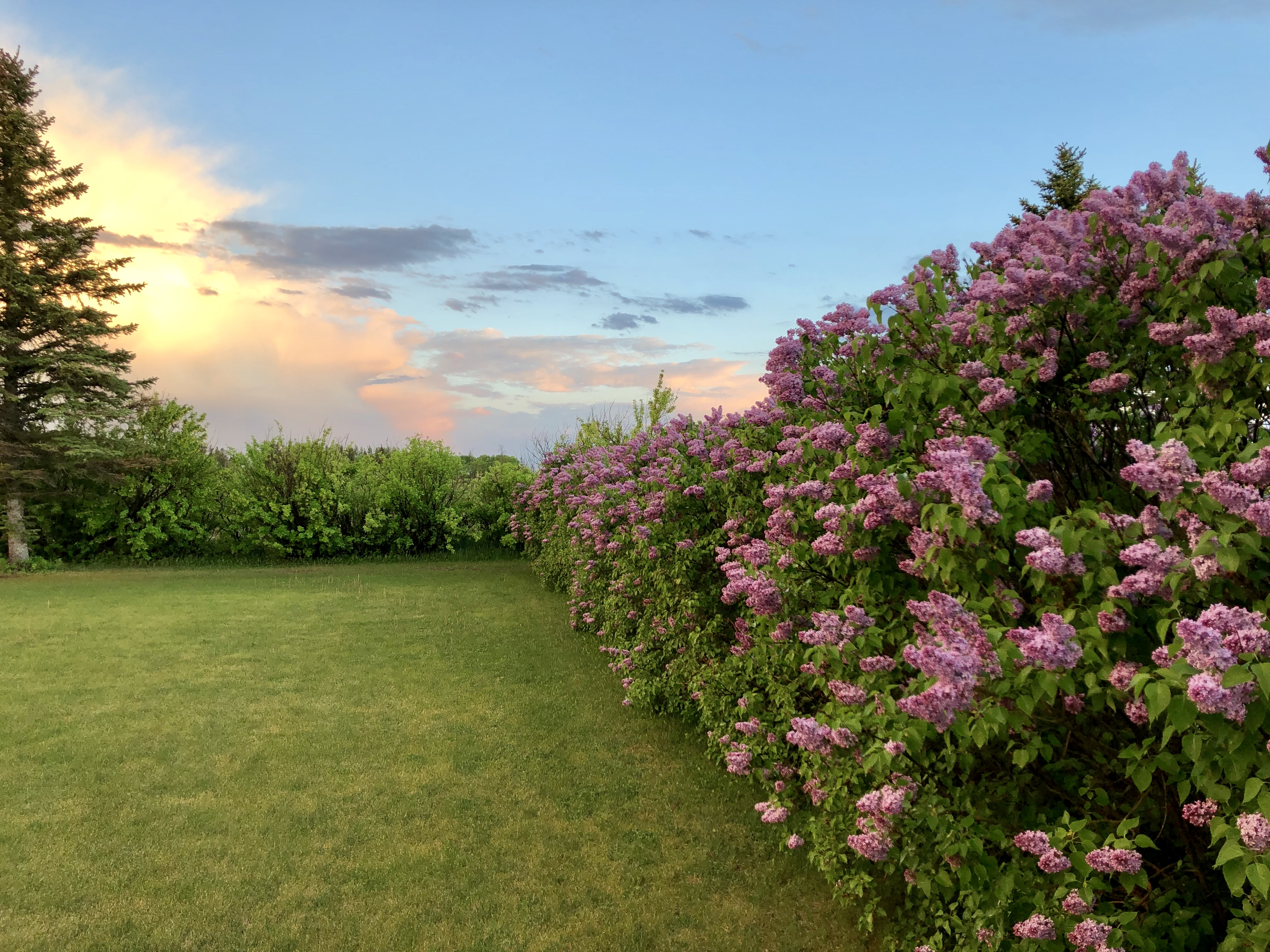
A lilac hedge at a residence in Okno, MB
