= Camp Morton Provincial Park =

Provincial park in Manitoba, Canada

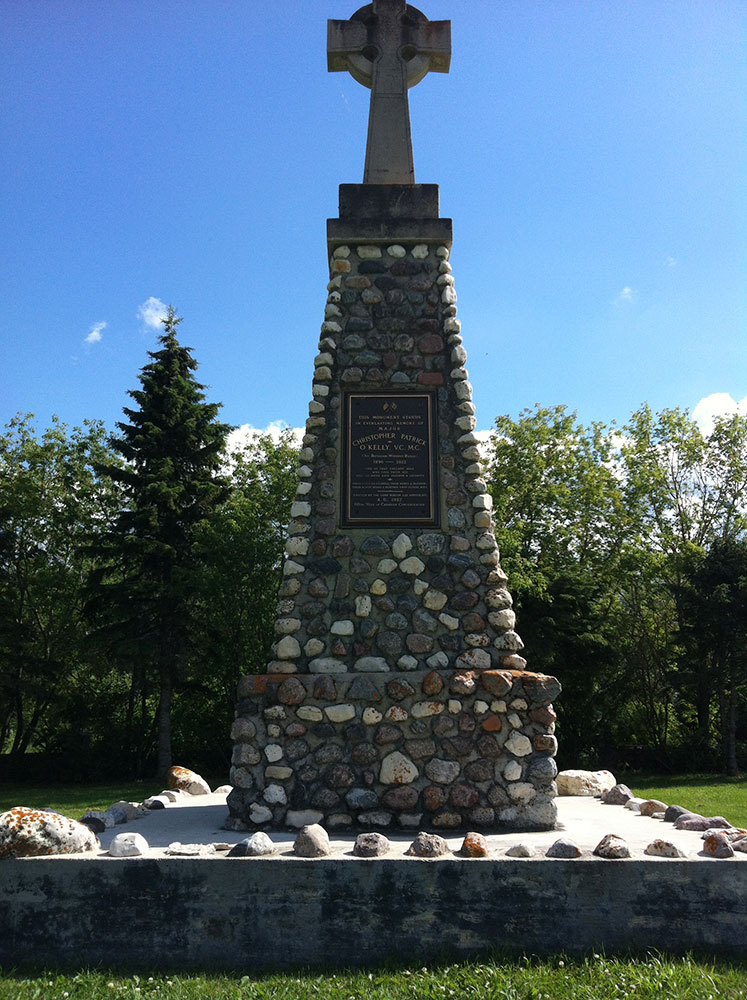

- Location within Manitoba
- Interactive map of Camp Morton Provincial Park
- Location: Manitoba, Canada
- Nearest town: Gimli, Manitoba
- Coordinates: 50°42′36″N 96°59′25″W
- Area: 250.23 ha (618.3 acres)
- Established: 1974
- Governing body: Government of Manitoba

Camp Morton Provincial Park is a provincial park located on the west shore of Lake Winnipeg in Manitoba, Canada, about 6 kilometres (3.7 mi) north of Gimli. It is 250.23 hectares (0.9661 sq mi) in size. It was designated as a provincial park in 1974.

The park is located in the Gimli eco-district within the Interlake Plain eco-region. This eco-region is part of the Boreal Plains eco-zone.

The Gimli Cross Country Ski Club maintains several kilometres of trail within the park for cross-country skiing in the winter.

== See also ==
- List of protected areas of Manitoba
- List of provincial parks in Manitoba
