= Morweena =

Coordinates: 50.994°N 97.409°W

Morweena is a small community in Manitoba of approximately 150 people. It is 140 kilometres (87 mi) north of Winnipeg, accessible from Provincial Road 329, in the Municipality of Bifrost-Riverton.

A notable person from Morweena is James Reimer, a goaltender with the Buffalo Sabres in the National Hockey League.
