= Municipality of Bifrost-Riverton =

Rural municipality in Manitoba, Canada

Bifrost-Riverton
- Rural municipality
- Municipality of Bifrost-Riverton
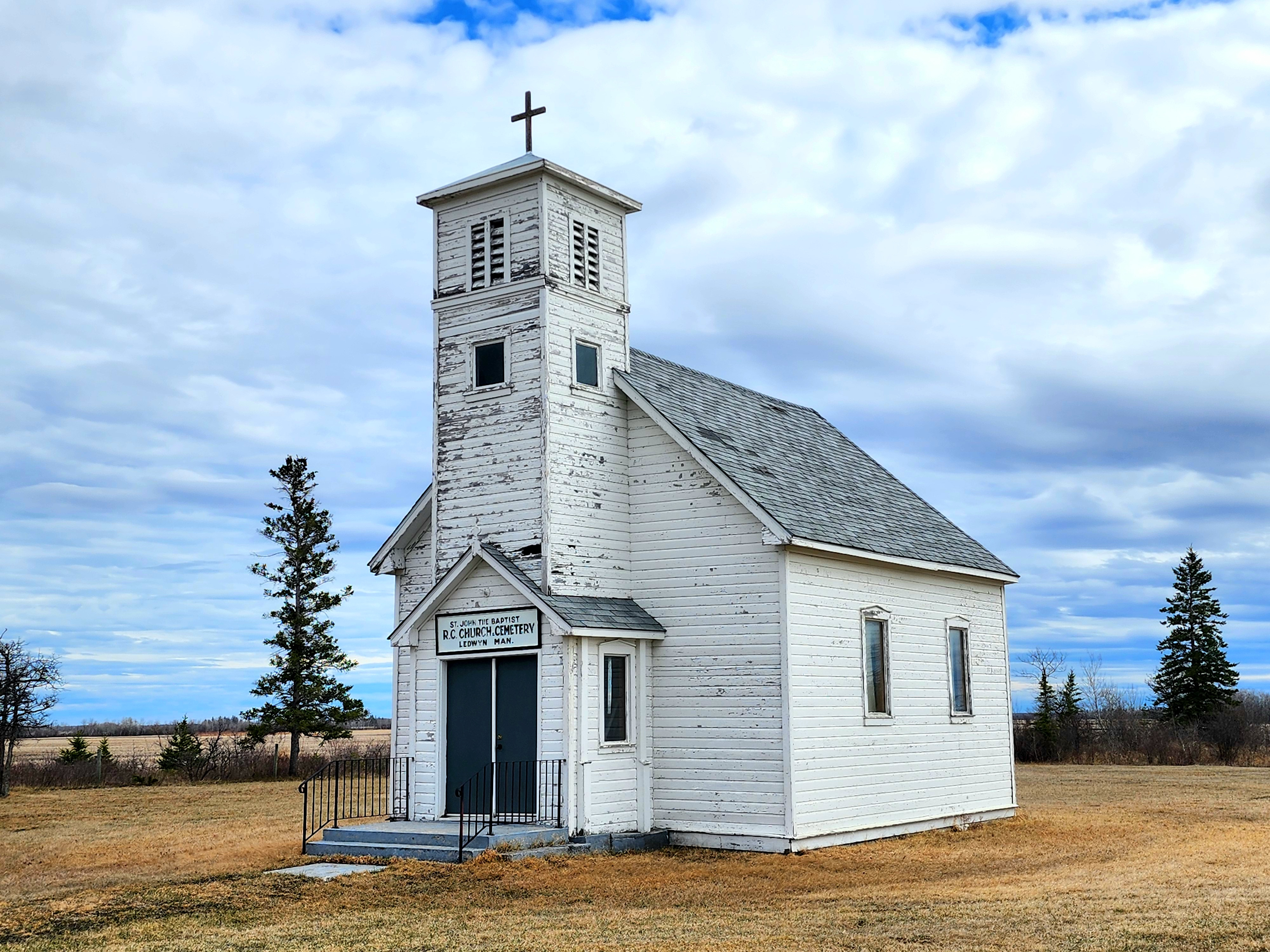
- St. John the Baptist Roman Catholic Church near Ledwyn in the Municipality of Bifrost-Riverton.

- Location of Bifrost-Riverton in Manitoba
- Coordinates: 50.907°N 97.221°W
- Country: Canada
- Province: Manitoba
- Region: Interlake
- Incorporated (amalgamated): January 1, 2015

Government
  - Reeve: Brian N. Johnson
  - MP: James Bezan (Selkirk—Interlake—Eastman)
  - MLA: Derek Johnson (Interlake-Gimli)

Area
  - Total: 1,643.69 km^{2} (634.63 sq mi)

Population (2021)
  - Total: 3,320
  - Density: 2.02/km^{2} (5.23/sq mi)
- Time zone: UTC-6 (CST)
  - Summer (DST): UTC-5 (CDT)
- Formerly: RM of Bifrost and Village of Riverton
- Website: bifrostriverton.ca

The Municipality of Bifrost-Riverton is a rural municipality (RM) in the Canadian province of Manitoba, and is one of the northernmost rural municipalities in the Interlake Region.

To the west is the Rural Municipality of Fisher and the Rural Municipality of Armstrong is located to the south as well as the Rural Municipality of Gimli. The Town of Arborg is located within the boundaries of Bifrost-Riverton but is not a part of the rural municipality.

== History ==
Bifrost-Riverton was created out of the former Rural Municipality of Bifrost and Village of Riverton.

In 1875, the Government of Canada set aside Townships 18, 19, 20, 21, 22 and 23 from the shore of Lake Winnipeg to the beginning of Range 2E for Icelandic settlement. A growing population eventually necessitated the establishment of local government. As such, the Rural Municipality of Gimli was established in 1887.

Thirty years later, on December 1, 1907, the Rural Municipality of Bifrost was incorporated out of the northern part of the RM of Gimli. Bifrost took its name from Norse mythology, where Bifröst is the rainbow bridge that connects Midgard (Earth) and Asgard, the home of the gods.

The community of Lundi (Icelandic for 'grove of trees')—later known as Icelandic River for the river that bisects it—was also established. In 1910, the Canadian Pacific Railway (Winnipeg Beach subdivision) was extended to the community of Arborg, followed in 1914 by Lundi, whose name was changed to Riverton with the coming of the railway.

With the railway came another influx of population growth, resulting in the separation of the two large urban areas. On February 5, 1917, the Unincorporated Village District of Arborg was created, followed by its incorporation on January 1, 1964.

On February 1, 1926, the Unincorporated Village District of Riverton was created on February 1, 1926, followed by its incorporation as a village on December 31, 1951.

On January 1, 2015, the RM of Bifrost and the Village of Riverton amalgamated to form the Municipality of Bifrost-Riverton. It was formed as a requirement of The Municipal Amalgamations Act, which mandated that municipalities with a population less than 1,000 amalgamate with one or more neighbouring municipalities by 2015. The Government of Manitoba initiated these amalgamations in order for municipalities to meet the 1997 minimum population requirement of 1,000 to incorporate a municipality. The amalgamation did not include the Town of Arborg, which is surrounded by Bifrost-Riverton.

== Communities ==
- Finns
- Geysir
- Hnausa
- Jaroslaw
- Morweena
- Okno
- Riverton
- Rosenburg
- Shorncliffe
- Washow Bay

The Town of Arborg is located within the boundaries of Bifrost-Riverton but is not a part of the rural municipality.

== Demographics ==
In the 2021 Census of Population conducted by Statistics Canada, Bifrost-Riverton had a population of 3,320 living in 1,200 of its 1,598 total private dwellings, a change of −1.7% from its 2016 population of 3,378. With a land area of 1,643.14 km^{2} (634.42 sq mi), it had a population density of 2.0/km^{2} (5.2/sq mi) in 2021.

== People ==
- Reggie Leach — former professional ice hockey player
- Peter Masniuk — politician born in Morweena
- James Reimer — professional Toronto Maple Leafs ice hockey goaltender, grew up in Morweena
- Sveinn Thorvaldson — reeve of Bifrost from 1908 to 1914.
- Gunnar Thorvaldson — politician born in Riverton

== See also ==
- Arborg, Manitoba
- Riverton, Manitoba
- Interlake-Gimli
