= Icelandic River =

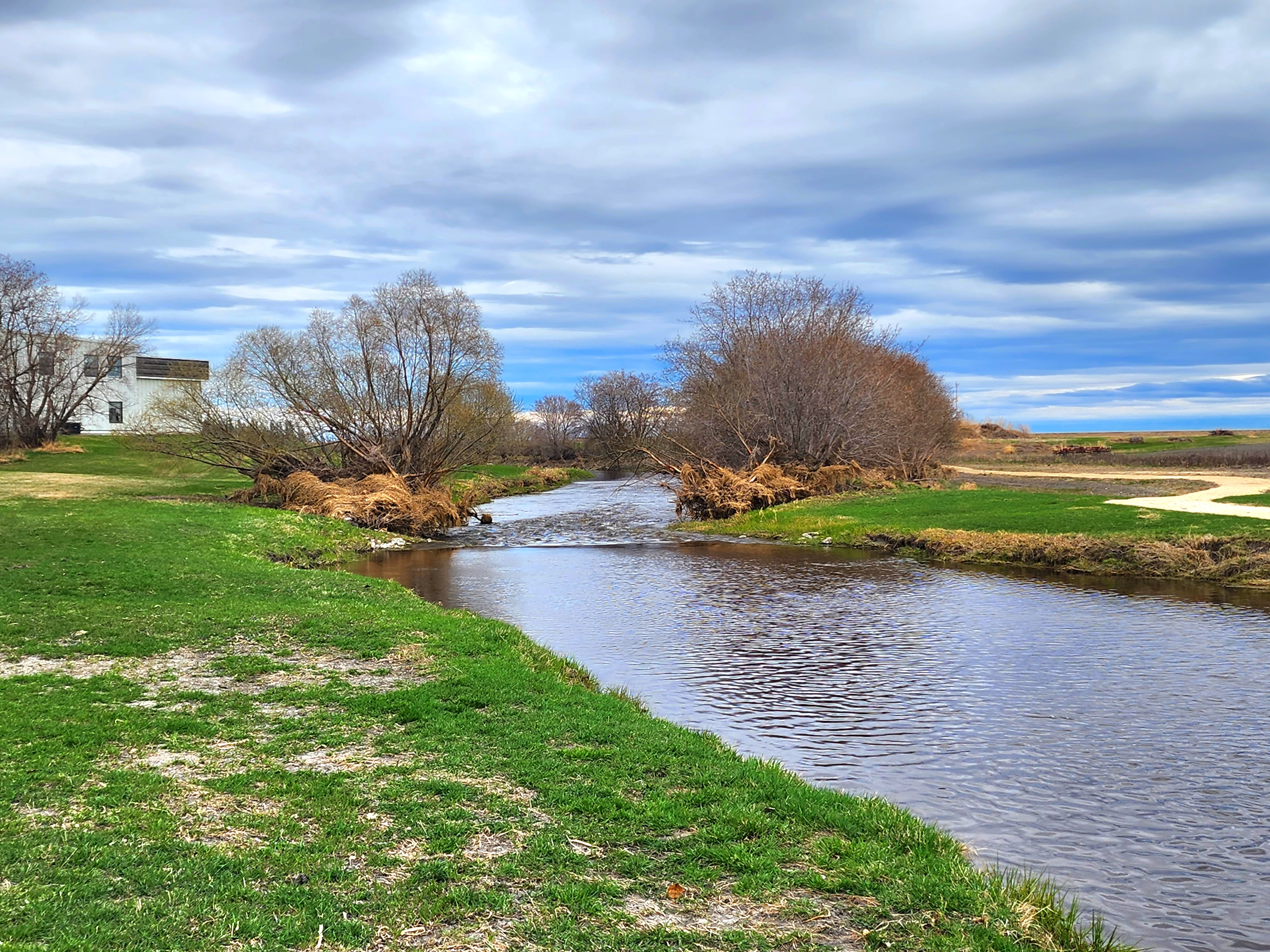
- The Icelandic River meandering away from Arborg, Manitoba.

- Location within Manitoba

Location
- Country: Canada
- Province: Manitoba

Physical characteristics
- Source: Spruce Lake system
  - coordinates: 50°52′47″N 97°44′51″W
  - elevation: 302 m (991 ft)
- Mouth: Lake Winnipeg
  - location: Riverton, Manitoba
  - coordinates: 51°01′35″N 96°57′42″W
  - elevation: 218 m (715 ft)
- Basin size: 1,336 km^{2} (516 sq mi)
- Discharge
  - location: 50°57′53″N 97°02′14″W
  - average: 3.5 m^{3}/s (120 cu ft/s)
  - minimum: 0 m^{3}/s (0 cu ft/s)
  - maximum: 108 m^{3}/s (3,800 cu ft/s)

The Icelandic River is a river in the Interlake Region of Manitoba. Its headwaters are near the Spruce Lakes system located by Manitoba Highway 68.

The river is the source of an agricultural area in the north of the Interlake, flowing through and supporting the communities of Arborg and Riverton. The East Interlake Conservation Area has assessed that 81% of the land use of the Icelandic River watershed is used for an agricultural purpose.

The Icelandic River is also one of the most important spawning sites on the western shores of Lake Winnipeg for fish such as walleye, though recreation and agricultural activities have inhibited this capability recently.

The river's mouth is located at Riverton, where the water flows into Lake Winnipeg.

== Etymology ==
The river was originally known as White River, appearing on John Arrowsmith's map of 1821.

In the early days of settlement, the river was the main "road", by boat in summer and by ice in winter. Hardwoods such as elm and maple grew along its banks. In spring and early summer, it provided walleye, jackfish, mullets, catfish, and goldeye.

It was later known as the Whitemud River, appearing on John Palliser's map of 1865; however, confusion with the other Whitemud River in Manitoba prompted the name to be changed.

In 1875, Whitemud was renamed "Icelander's River" by an Icelandic expedition, as it marked the northern border of New Iceland. This name became Icelandic River.

This name was later given to the community found at the mouth of the river on Lake Winnipeg. The community of Icelandic River was later changed to Riverton.

== See also ==
- List of rivers of Manitoba
