= Rural Municipality of Fisher =

Rural municipality in Manitoba, Canada

Fisher
- Rural municipality
- Rural Municipality of Fisher
- Location of Fisher in Manitoba
- Coordinates: 51°04′57″N 97°39′40″W
- Country: Canada
- Province: Manitoba
- Region: Interlake
- Incorporated: January 1, 1945

Area
  - Total: 1,479.35 km^{2} (571.18 sq mi)

Population (2021)
  - Total: 1,845
  - Density: 1.247/km^{2} (3.230/sq mi)
- Time zone: UTC-6 (CST)
  - Summer (DST): UTC-5 (CDT)
- Website: www.rmoffisher.com

Fisher is a rural municipality in the Canadian province of Manitoba.

== Communities ==
- Broad Valley
- Fisher Branch
- Fisherton
- Hodgson
- Poplarfield
- Sylvan
- Zbaraz

== Demographics ==
In the 2021 Census of Population conducted by Statistics Canada, Fisher had a population of 1,845 living in 660 of its 799 total private dwellings, a change of 1% from its 2016 population of 1,827. With a land area of 1,486.17 km^{2} (573.81 sq mi), it had a population density of 1.2/km^{2} (3.2/sq mi) in 2021.
