= Fisher Branch =

Fisher Branch Hub of the Interlake
- Location of Fisher Branch in Manitoba
- Coordinates: 51°4′59″N 97°37′12″W
- Country: Canada
- Province: Manitoba
- Region: Interlake
- Census Division: No. 18

Government
  - Governing Body: Rural Municipality of Fisher Council
  - MP: James Bezan
  - MLA: Derek Johnson

Area
  - Total: 1.75 km^{2} (0.68 sq mi)
- Elevation: 251 m (823 ft)

Population (Canada 2011 Census)
  - Total: 460
  - Density: 260/km^{2} (680/sq mi)
- Time zone: UTC−6 (CST)
  - Summer (DST): UTC−5 (CDT)
- Postal code: R0C 0Z0
- Area code: 204
- NTS Map: 062P04
- GNBC Code: GAIGX
- Website: www.semhq.net/rm-of-fisher/

Fisher Branch is an unincorporated community recognized as a local urban district in the Rural Municipality of Fisher in the Canadian province of Manitoba. It is located on Highway 17 in the north Interlake Region of the province. Fisher Branch was originally named Wasoo, but later was changed to Fisher Branch because it was beside a branch of the Fisher River. The primary industry of Fisher Branch is agriculture.

== Demographics ==
In the 2021 Census of Population conducted by Statistics Canada, Fisher Branch had a population of 465 living in 187 of its 228 total private dwellings, a change of 2.9% from its 2016 population of 452. With a land area of 2.01 km^{2} (0.78 sq mi), it had a population density of 231.3/km^{2} (599.2/sq mi) in 2021.

== Media ==
CBWGT went on CBWT-1 on February 1, 1967 as part of the province-wide microwave system.

- CKYA-TV Channel 8 (CTV)

== Climate ==
Climate data for Fisher Branch
Month	Jan	Feb	Mar	Apr	May	Jun	Jul	Aug	Sep	Oct	Nov	Dec	Year
Record high °C (°F)	7 (45)	8.5 (47.3)	16.5 (61.7)	32.5 (90.5)	38 (100)	39 (102)	35 (95)	37.5 (99.5)	39 (102)	30.5 (86.9)	18.9 (66.0)	7.5 (45.5)	39 (102)
Mean daily maximum °C (°F)	−13.4 (7.9)	−8.8 (16.2)	−1.7 (28.9)	9 (48)	18.1 (64.6)	22.6 (72.7)	25.2 (77.4)	24.2 (75.6)	17.4 (63.3)	9.6 (49.3)	−2.1 (28.2)	−11 (12)	7.4 (45.3)
Daily mean °C (°F)	−18.8 (−1.8)	−14.4 (6.1)	−7.3 (18.9)	2.7 (36.9)	10.8 (51.4)	15.7 (60.3)	18.5 (65.3)	17.2 (63.0)	11.3 (52.3)	4.3 (39.7)	−6.4 (20.5)	−15.6 (3.9)	1.5 (34.7)
Mean daily minimum °C (°F)	−23.9 (−11.0)	−19.9 (−3.8)	−12.8 (9.0)	−3.6 (25.5)	3.5 (38.3)	8.8 (47.8)	11.8 (53.2)	10.1 (50.2)	5.1 (41.2)	−1 (30)	−10.5 (13.1)	−20.1 (−4.2)	−4.4 (24.1)
Record low °C (°F)	−44 (−47)	−45 (−49)	−38.5 (−37.3)	−29 (−20)	−12.5 (9.5)	−3 (27)	0 (32)	−2.5 (27.5)	−6 (21)	−20 (−4)	−37 (−35)	−41 (−42)	−45 (−49)
Average precipitation mm (inches)	18.6 (0.73)	16.3 (0.64)	22.6 (0.89)	32.5 (1.28)	48.2 (1.90)	84.5 (3.33)	62.9 (2.48)	72.9 (2.87)	62 (2.4)	45.7 (1.80)	25.5 (1.00)	20.3 (0.80)	511.9 (20.15)
Source: Environment Canada
