= Rural Municipality of Armstrong =

Rural municipality in Manitoba, Canada

Armstrong
- Rural municipality
- Rural Municipality of Armstrong
- Location of Armstrong in Manitoba
- Coordinates: 50°38′24″N 97°29′42″W
- Country: Canada
- Province: Manitoba
- Region: Interlake
- Incorporated: January 1, 1945
- Named for: James William Armstrong

Area
  - Total: 1,868.24 km^{2} (721.33 sq mi)

Population (2021)
  - Total: 1,967
- Time zone: UTC-6 (CST)
  - Summer (DST): UTC-5 (CDT)
- Website: www.rmofarmstrong.com

Armstrong is a rural municipality in the province of Manitoba in Western Canada. It lies in the southern area of the Interlake and was named after James William Armstrong, a Manitoba politician.

== History ==
Historical population
Year	Pop.	±%
1981	1,957	—
1986	2,039	+4.2%
1996	1,866	−8.5%
2001	1,905	+2.1%
2006	1,919	+0.7%
2011	1,835	−4.4%
2016	1,792	−2.3%
2021	1,967	+9.8%

The surrounding area was settled by immigrants from western Ukraine at the start of the 20th century. Amongst the original settlers were Michael Pomaransky and Stefan Humeny who settled section 14-19-2E, approximately ten miles west of the community of Gimli. A sizeable community developed as these settlers were joined in the year 1900 by other individuals from the village of Kopychentsi, Ukraine.

The hamlet of Kreuzberg received its first post office in 1910.

The area was originally incorporated as three distinct rural municipalities, Armstrong, Kreuzberg and Chatfield, in 1913.

Incorporating much of the marginal farmland on the western edge of the Rural Municipality of Gimli, this area saw a number of schools built along the railway line that was constructed three years earlier. These were located in the hamlets of Malonton, Meleb, Rembrandt and Kreuzberg.

The hamlet of Kreuzburg was renamed Fraserwood during World War I, due to anti-German sentiments. Its name is derived from the surname of the postmaster at the time, Wood, and his wife's maiden name Fraser. The hamlet of Narcisse was named after Narcisse Leven, then the president of the Jewish Colonization Association (JCA or ICA), by the residents of Bender Hamlet, a Jewish farm colony located 2 km east of Narcisse.

During the Great Depression, the rural municipalities of Armstrong, Kreuzberg and Chatfield were dissolved, and were administered as the Local Government District of Armstrong. The region was heavily affected by failure of the wheat crop in this era, resulting in one of the most serious poverty crises in all of Manitoba.

On September 21, 1936 Lord Tweedsmuir, the Governor General of Canada, paid a visit to the region. When the school term opened, teacher Olga Uhryniuk received an official notice from the government that the Governor General was making a Canada-wide tour and that he planned to meet with the citizens of the hamlet of Fraserwood. Tweedsmuir visited the school and made an address to the students and numerous community members.

The local government district of Armstrong was subsequently reconstituted as a rural municipality in 1997.

The area is also home to the Narcisse Snake Dens, a provincial wildlife management area which is the world's largest known winter den for garter snakes.

== Communities ==
The rural municipality encompasses and governs the hamlets of Chatfield, Fraserwood, Inwood, Komarno, Malonton, Meleb, Narcisse, Neveton, Rembrandt, Sandridge and Silver.

== Demographics ==
In the 2021 Census of Population conducted by Statistics Canada, Armstrong had a population of 1,967 living in 831 of its 1,056 total private dwellings, a change of 9.8% from its 2016 population of 1,792. With a land area of 1,868.24 km^{2} (721.33 sq mi), it had a population density of 1.1/km^{2} (2.7/sq mi) in 2021.

== Climate ==
Climate data for Fraserwood
Month	Jan	Feb	Mar	Apr	May	Jun	Jul	Aug	Sep	Oct	Nov	Dec	Year
Record high °C (°F)	7.5 (45.5)	7.5 (45.5)	15.6 (60.1)	34 (93)	37 (99)	37 (99)	35 (95)	38 (100)	37.5 (99.5)	26.7 (80.1)	21.1 (70.0)	8.9 (48.0)	38 (100)
Mean daily maximum °C (°F)	−13.4 (7.9)	−9.4 (15.1)	−1.8 (28.8)	9.9 (49.8)	18.8 (65.8)	22.7 (72.9)	25.5 (77.9)	23.9 (75.0)	17.3 (63.1)	10 (50)	−1.5 (29.3)	−10.6 (12.9)	7.6 (45.7)
Daily mean °C (°F)	−18.7 (−1.7)	−15 (5)	−7.3 (18.9)	3.5 (38.3)	11.6 (52.9)	16 (61)	18.9 (66.0)	17.4 (63.3)	11.4 (52.5)	4.9 (40.8)	−5.4 (22.3)	−15.3 (4.5)	1.8 (35.2)
Mean daily minimum °C (°F)	−24 (−11)	−20.5 (−4.9)	−12.8 (9.0)	−2.9 (26.8)	4.4 (39.9)	9.3 (48.7)	12.4 (54.3)	10.8 (51.4)	5.4 (41.7)	−0.2 (31.6)	−9.3 (15.3)	−20 (−4)	−4 (25)
Record low °C (°F)	−43.9 (−47.0)	−42 (−44)	−38 (−36)	−28.9 (−20.0)	−11 (12)	−2.5 (27.5)	1.7 (35.1)	−2 (28)	−8.3 (17.1)	−18 (0)	−38 (−36)	−40.6 (−41.1)	−43.9 (−47.0)
Average precipitation mm (inches)	22.9 (0.90)	18.1 (0.71)	25.2 (0.99)	32.5 (1.28)	51.4 (2.02)	76.2 (3.00)	81.8 (3.22)	70.1 (2.76)	57.4 (2.26)	40 (1.6)	25.4 (1.00)	25.3 (1.00)	526.4 (20.72)
Source: Environment Canada

== Gallery ==
Fraserwood from the air

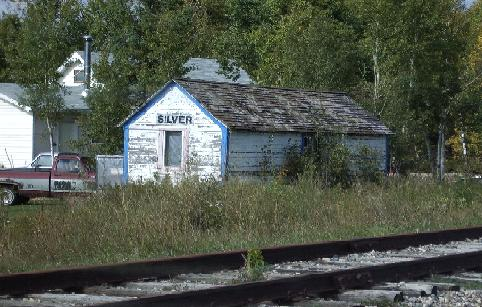
Train station in Silver
