= Arborg, Manitoba =

Town in Manitoba

Arborg
- Town
- Town of Arborg
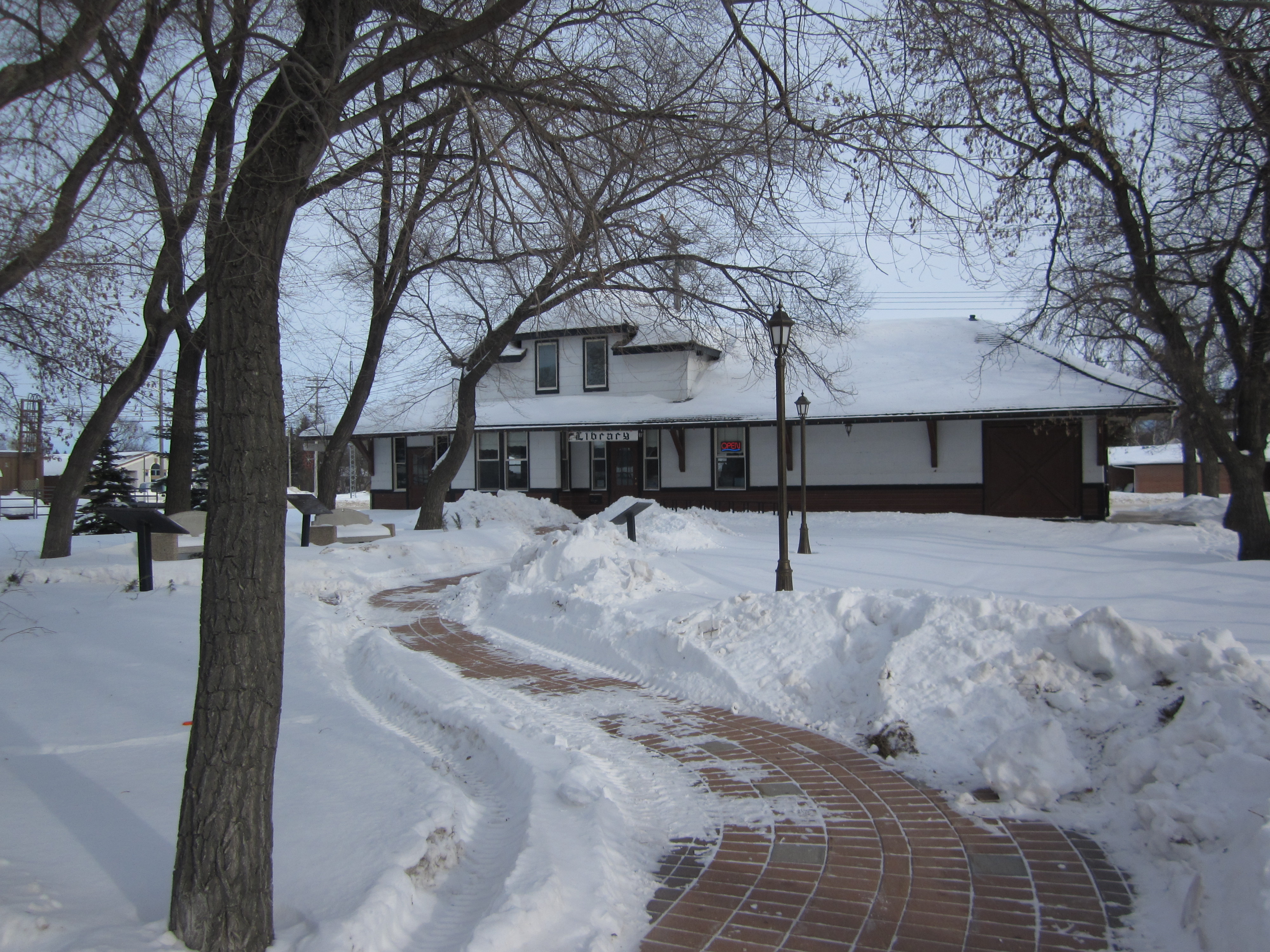
- Arborg CPR Station

- Town boundaries

- Location within Manitoba
- Coordinates: 50°54′27.1″N 97°13′5.4″W
- Country: Canada
- Province: Manitoba
- Region: Interlake
- Founded: 1890
- (Village): 1964
- (Town): 1997

Area
  - Total: 2.00 km^{2} (0.77 sq mi)
- Elevation: 229 m (751 ft)

Population (2021)
  - Total: 1,279
  - Density: 640/km^{2} (1,660/sq mi)
- Postal code: R0C 0A0
- Area codes: 204, 431
- Website: townofarborg.com

Arborg is a town located along the Icelandic River in Manitoba, Canada. The community is located 103 kilometres north of Winnipeg, at the junction of Manitoba Highways 7 and 68, in the Interlake Region of Manitoba. The town is surrounded by the Municipality of Bifrost - Riverton and has a population of 1,279 as of the 2021 Canadian census.

== Etymology ==
The name of the town comes from the Icelandic word meaning 'river town'.

== History ==
The picturesque setting along the Icelandic River was first discovered by settlers of New Iceland when they arrived in the area in 1878. Settlers had landed at the community of Icelandic River which is now known as Riverton, Manitoba, and they saw the agricultural potential of the inland meadows. Unfortunately, New Iceland was hit with a series of setbacks, including a smallpox outbreak in 1880 which prevented the area's development at the time.

The first settlers near Arborg were the three Borgfjord brothers, Gudmundur, Thorsteinn and Jon who arrived in 1890. It was not until the summer of 1900 when Iceland settlers from North Dakota arrived and began to the settle the area en masse. Land in North Dakota had become expensive and scarce and thus these Icelandic pioneer searched for cheaper and available land. They travelled from Winnipeg to Hnausa by boat and then travelled along the muddy Geysir Road to current site of the town. The Geysir Road would later become the current Highway 68 and in those early days they applied for government support to help clear and maintain the road. The settlers also applied to the government for postal services and 1902 they were granted one. The first postal office was called Ardal (Icelandic Árdalur, meaning "River Valley" and named after the first postmaster Stefan Petur Gudmundsson. More Icelandic settlers arrived at the town in 1902-03 when settlers who were flooded out of their properties north of Riverton came in search of better land. In these early years, the community grew building roads, schools, churches, and community halls. Drainage projects were built in order to allow the new agricultural fields to dry and produce large crops of wheat.

The greatest growth and change for Arborg came in 1910 when the Canadian Pacific Railway reached the settlement. Sigtryggur Jonasson was the area's representative in the Manitoba Legislature and had long lobbied to have the northern line built into the community. The name was changed to Arborg (Árborg, meaning 'River Town'). The original railway station from 1910 still stands and is today a municipally recognized heritage site. The building has now been converted into a public library.

Icelanders established homesteads to the east, west, north, and south of the village, and by 1908 the first Polish and Ukrainian settlers had arrived in the area. The coming of the railroad brought large numbers of Ukrainians who settled throughout the district along with groups from other European countries. This mixture gave Arborg a rich cultural diversity and its own distinct character.

Today, Arborg serves as a regional business hub for the Municipality of Bifrost-Riverton which is home to grain farming, cattle ranches, and numerous manufacturing companies. Arborg offers government services, financial services, retail, construction supplies, and agricultural implements.

== Climate ==
Arborg has a similar summer to other prairie cities with an August high of 24.0C, compared with 22.5C in Calgary or 24.4C in Saskatoon. Winters are cold and spring and autumn have pleasant weather. Annual precipitation equals 499.4mm (19.7 inches).

Climate data for Arborg (1981–2010 normals)
Month	Jan	Feb	Mar	Apr	May	Jun	Jul	Aug	Sep	Oct	Nov	Dec	Year
Record high °C (°F)	7.5 (45.5)	7.8 (46.0)	16.7 (62.1)	30.0 (86.0)	37.0 (98.6)	37.0 (98.6)	36.5 (97.7)	36.1 (97.0)	36.5 (97.7)	28.5 (83.3)	20.6 (69.1)	9.5 (49.1)	37.0 (98.6)
Mean daily maximum °C (°F)	−12.6 (9.3)	−8.9 (16.0)	−1.8 (28.8)	9.1 (48.4)	16.9 (62.4)	21.9 (71.4)	24.8 (76.6)	24.0 (75.2)	17.5 (63.5)	9.1 (48.4)	−1.6 (29.1)	−9.9 (14.2)	7.4 (45.3)
Daily mean °C (°F)	−18.3 (−0.9)	−14.9 (5.2)	−7.5 (18.5)	3.0 (37.4)	10.0 (50.0)	15.8 (60.4)	18.6 (65.5)	17.5 (63.5)	11.5 (52.7)	3.9 (39.0)	−6.0 (21.2)	−14.8 (5.4)	1.6 (34.9)
Mean daily minimum °C (°F)	−23.9 (−11.0)	−20.8 (−5.4)	−13.3 (8.1)	−3.2 (26.2)	3.2 (37.8)	9.6 (49.3)	12.3 (54.1)	10.9 (51.6)	5.4 (41.7)	−1.3 (29.7)	−10.3 (13.5)	−19.7 (−3.5)	−4.3 (24.3)
Record low °C (°F)	−45.6 (−50.1)	−48.3 (−54.9)	−42.2 (−44.0)	−29.5 (−21.1)	−14.0 (6.8)	−5.0 (23.0)	1.1 (34.0)	−2.0 (28.4)	−7.8 (18.0)	−21.0 (−5.8)	−40.0 (−40.0)	−41.1 (−42.0)	−48.3 (−54.9)
Average precipitation mm (inches)	16.9 (0.67)	12.4 (0.49)	24.9 (0.98)	25.9 (1.02)	55.4 (2.18)	80.9 (3.19)	70.3 (2.77)	68.9 (2.71)	53.4 (2.10)	43.9 (1.73)	27.0 (1.06)	19.7 (0.78)	499.4 (19.66)
Average snowfall cm (inches)	16.9 (6.7)	10.1 (4.0)	15.3 (6.0)	7.8 (3.1)	1.2 (0.5)	0.0 (0.0)	0.0 (0.0)	0.0 (0.0)	0.4 (0.2)	6.9 (2.7)	18.3 (7.2)	18.7 (7.4)	95.6 (37.6)
Source: Environment Canada

== Demographics ==
Population Growth
Year	Pop.	±%
1966	891	—
1971	879	−1.3%
1976	861	−2.0%
1981	974	+13.1%
1986	1,018	+4.5%
1991	1,039	+2.1%
1996	1,012	−2.6%
2001	959	−5.2%
2006	1,021	+6.5%
2011	1,152	+12.8%
2016	1,232	+6.9%
2021	1,279	+3.8%

In the 2021 Census of Population conducted by Statistics Canada, Arborg had a population of 1,279 living in 499 of its 531 total private dwellings, a change of 3.8% from its 2016 population of 1,232. With a land area of 2.22 km^{2} (0.86 sq mi), it had a population density of 576.1/km^{2} (1,492.2/sq mi) in 2021.

== Education ==
Arborg has two schools- Arborg Collegiate Institute and Arborg Early Middle Years School with enrolments of 119 and 241 students in September 2019, respectively.

== Arborg & District Multicultural Heritage Village ==
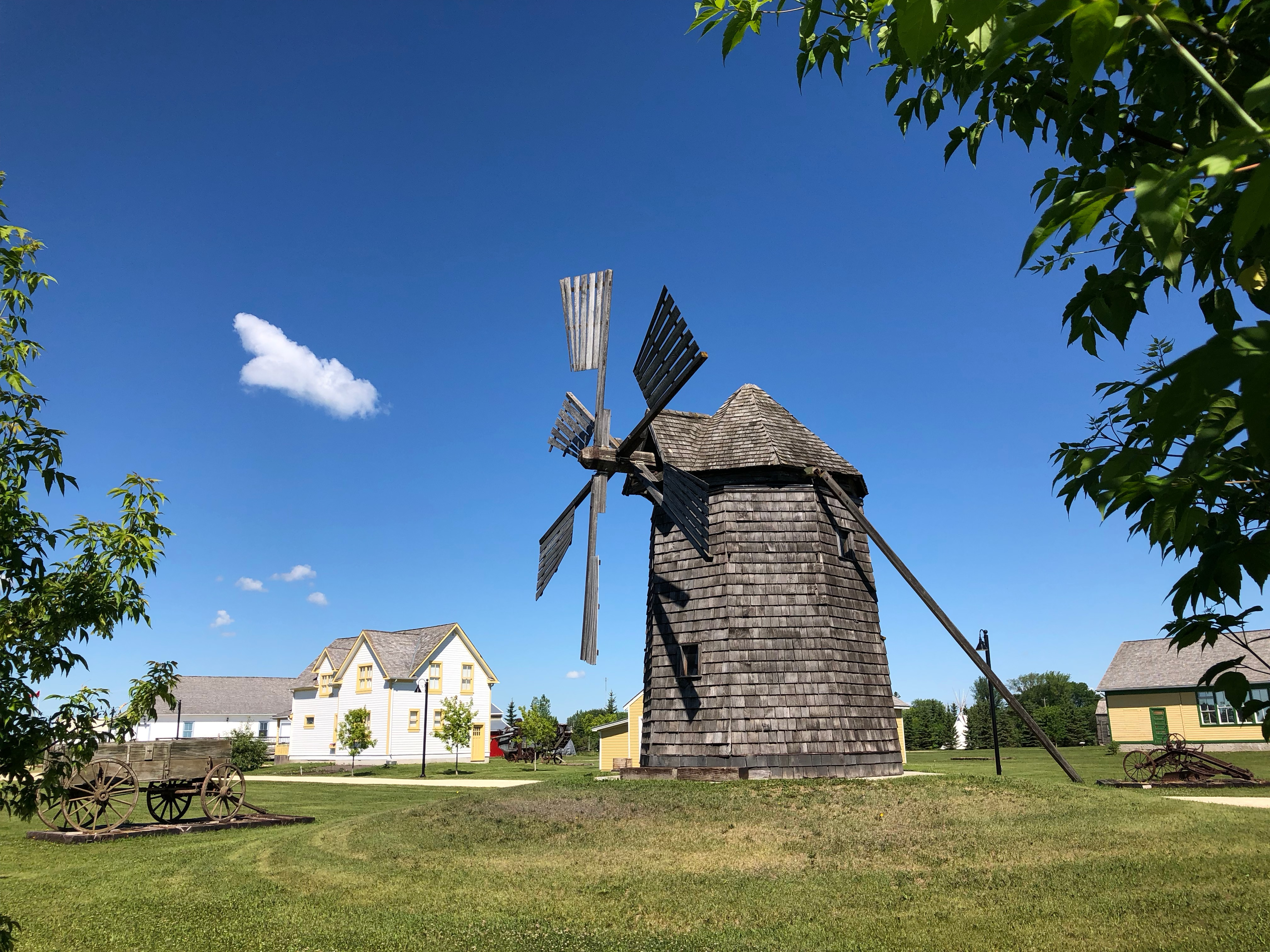
The Hykaway Grist Mill (built in 1910) at the Arborg & District Multicultural Heritage Village.

The Arborg & District Multicultural Heritage Village is a working open-air museum and interpretive centre located just outside the town on Highway 68, on the south side of the Icelandic River. It preserves and showcases the multicultural history of the area. The first building, the Trausti Vigfusson house, was moved on site by a team of horses, commemorating the community spirit that built the area in the early 1900s. This log house was built around 1898 and originally stood in Lundi (today Riverton). Vigfusson, its original owner and builder, transported it to the nearby Geysir settlement in 1902.

The Arborg & District Multicultural Heritage Village is a community concept envisioned to promote and preserve for tomorrow those memories of the past. The Heritage Village had its grand opening 24 May 2008. To date a hall, church, caboose, outdoor bake oven and three houses have been completed. A school has been moved on the site and is currently awaiting restoration along with a foreman's rail car. Two Ukrainian log houses, a windmill as well as numerous farm equipment and artifacts have been added to the village in 2010.

== World's largest curling rock ==
Arborg is also home to the world's largest curling rock, which measures 4.2 m (13.78 ft) across and 2.1 m (6 ft 10.68 in) tall. Unlike an actual curling rock however, it is constructed with steel, foam, and fiberglass, with most of the weight consisting in the steel support beams.

== Notable people ==
- James Reimer, goaltender for the Ottawa Senators
