= Riverton, Manitoba =

Riverton
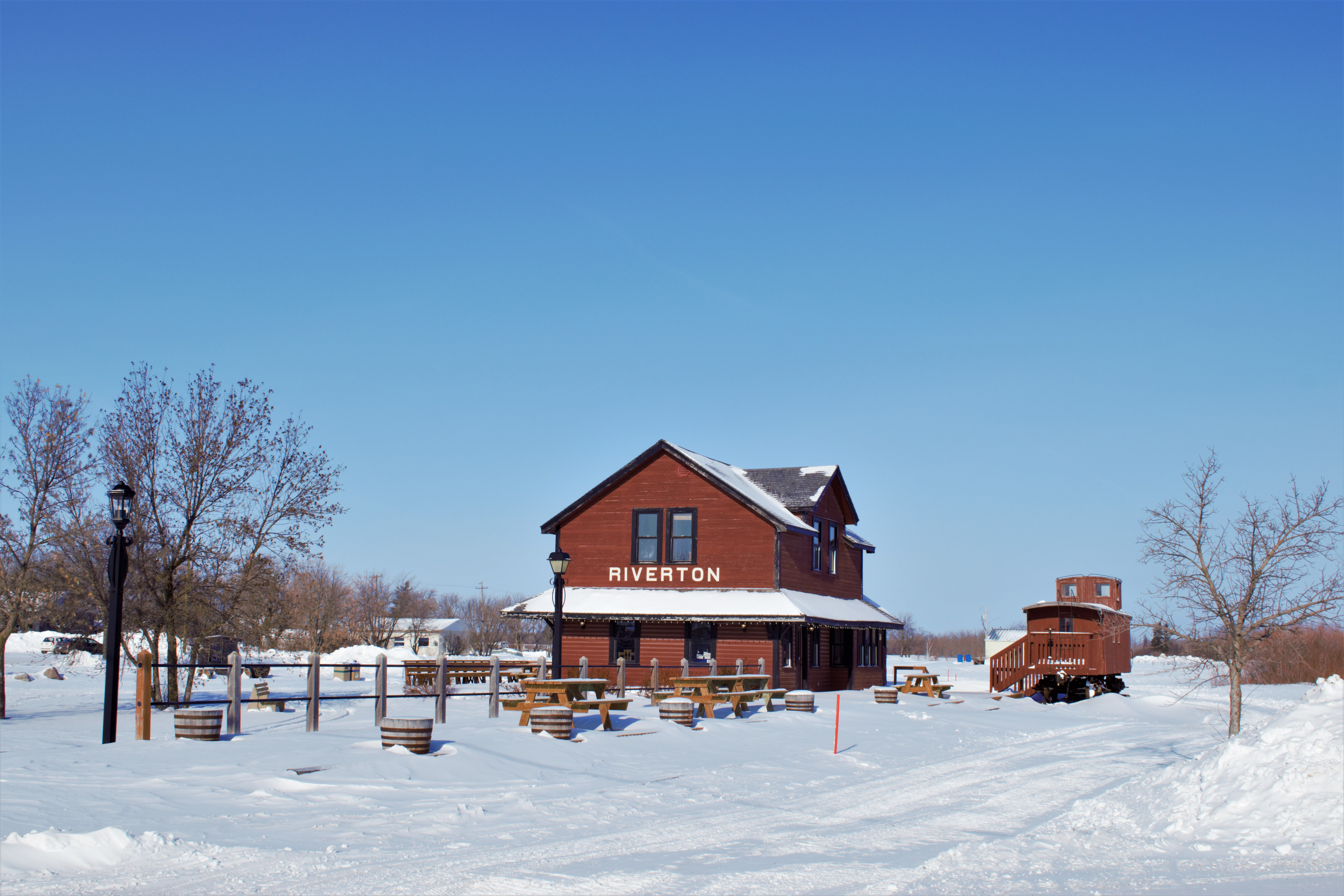
- Riverton Transportation and Heritage Museum in winter.

- Location of Riverton in Manitoba
- Coordinates: 50°59′45″N 96°59′55″W
- Country: Canada
- Province: Manitoba
- Region: Interlake
- Rural Municipality: Municipality of Bifrost – Riverton

Government
  - MP (Selkirk-Interlake-Eastman ): James Bezan (CPC)
  - MLA (Interlake-Gimli): Derek Johnson (PC)
- Elevation: 218 m (715 ft)

Population (2021)
  - Total: 475
- Time zone: UTC-6 (CST)
  - Summer (DST): UTC-5 (CDT)
- Postal code span: R0C 0A8
- Area code: 204

Riverton is an unincorporated urban community in the Municipality of Bifrost-Riverton within the Canadian province of Manitoba.

Located approximately 110 kilometres (68 mi) north of Winnipeg, the community held village status prior to January 1, 2015.

Riverton is a descriptive which replaced the earlier name, Icelandic River, which it took from the river that bisects the community.

== History ==
Known originally as Lundi (Icelandic for 'grove of trees'), the community was later renamed Icelandic River for the river that bisects it. The river got its name as it marked the northern border of New Iceland.

In 1910, the Canadian Pacific Railway (Winnipeg Beach subdivision) was extended to the community of Arborg, followed in 1914 by Lundi, whose name was changed to Riverton with the coming of the railway. The CPR's train conductor is reputed to have named the community.

With the railway came another influx of population growth. On February 1, 1926, the Unincorporated Village District of Riverton was created on February 1, 1926, followed by its incorporation as a village on December 31, 1951.

On January 1, 2015, the Village of Riverton merged with the Rural Municipality of Bifrost as part of the provincial Municipal Amalgamations Act, creating the current-day municipality of Bifrost-Riverton, where Riverton is now an unincorporated urban community.

=== 1979 solar eclipse ===
Riverton was the closest community to the point of maximum totality for the solar eclipse of February 26, 1979. This total solar eclipse was part of Saros cycle 120, Series 59. Riverton hosted astronomers and eclipse chasers from across the world, providing free rooms to many of the visitors.

== Demographics ==
In the 2021 Census of Population conducted by Statistics Canada, Riverton had a population of 475 living in 215 of its 254 total private dwellings, a change of −11.7% from its 2016 population of 538. With a land area of 1.19 km^{2} (0.46 sq mi), it had a population density of 399.2/km^{2} (1,033.8/sq mi) in 2021.

== Industry and recreation ==
The main economy is fishing. The Freshwater Fish Marketing Corporation operates a fish-packing factory on the banks of the Icelandic River, which passes through the centre of Riverton. Other industries include agriculture and the service sector, with manufacturing being done by ECB (Erosion Control Blanket) a distant third. Being in a unique position on the west shore of Lake Winnipeg, Riverton services the northern communities via a winter road. It is on the way to Hecla-Grindstone Provincial Park and many people from Winnipeg stop in or pass by the community on the way to cottage country each summer.

== Education ==
- Riverton Collegiate Institute
- Riverton Early Middle School

== Notable people ==
- Reggie Leach, former professional ice hockey player
- Gunnar Thorvaldson, Conservative senator, born in Riverton
