= Interlake Region =

Coordinates: 50°50′N 97°40′W

- Region of Manitoba
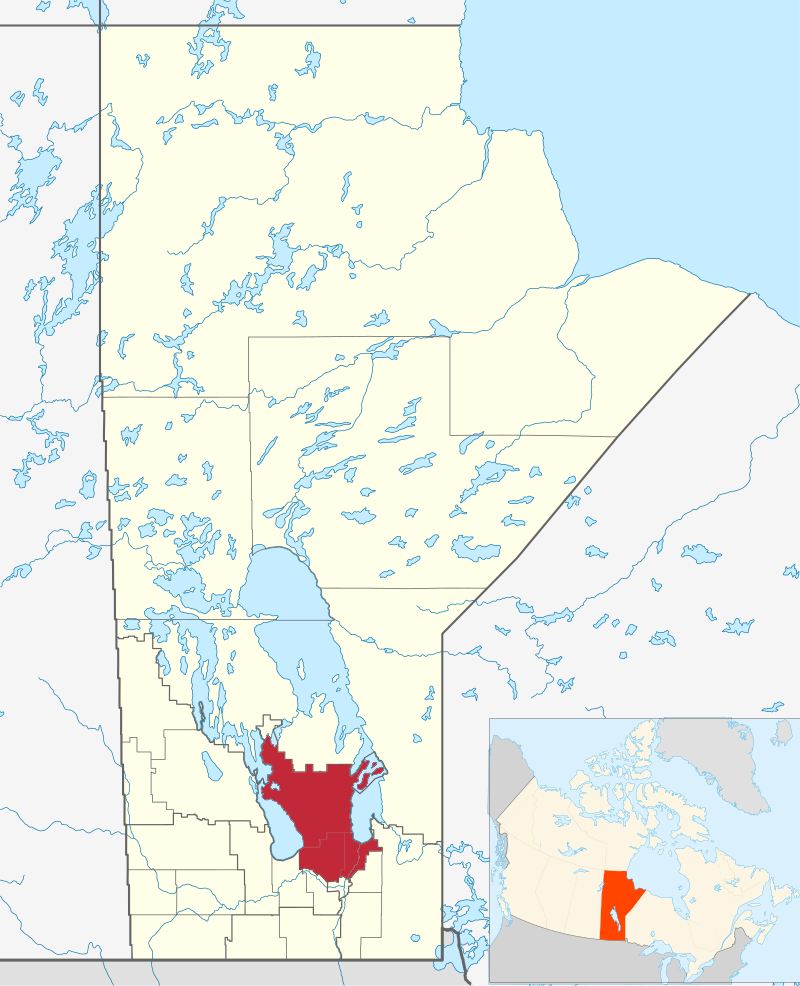
- Map of the Interlake Region of Manitoba.
- Country: Canada
- Province: Manitoba

Area
  - Total: 15,858.13 km^{2} (6,122.86 sq mi)

Population (2021)
  - Total: 98,028
  - Density: 6.1816/km^{2} (16.010/sq mi)

The Interlake Region is an informal geographic region of the Canadian province of Manitoba that lies roughly between Lake Winnipeg and Lake Manitoba.

The region comprises 14 rural municipalities, one city (Selkirk), six towns (Arborg, Riverton, Stonewall, Gimli, Teulon and Winnipeg Beach), and one village (Dunnottar). The largest population centre in the region is Selkirk, and the second largest is the town of Stonewall.

Argyle is a small hamlet that is located on the Principal Meridian of Canada, near the middle of the Interlake Region. Sandy Hook is located between Winnipeg Beach and Gimli, a popular summer vacation spot.

== Geography ==
Geographically, the Interlake Region is a low lying glacial lake basin that is poorly drained. The area is clearly defined on the west by the shores of Lake Manitoba and on the eastern edge by Lake Winnipeg. The northern and southern boundaries are less clearly defined geographically. The geography of the region is mostly composed of sandy beaches, wetlands, lakes, bogs, marshlands, agricultural fields, glacial till, rocky shorelines, and oak, aspen, and eastern cedar forests. The topography is mostly level and poorly drained, swamps exist in all portions of the region. The soils are mostly shallow and mixed with lime and thus mostly infertile. Agricultural areas do thrive in the regions surrounding the Icelandic River basin in the north around Arborg and Riverton, as well as in the area east of Teulon and close to Gimli.

=== Climate ===
The climate of the area is moderated by the lakes and overall is slightly cooler than the weather found in Winnipeg and southern Manitoba.

Climate data for Arborg (1981–2010 normals)
Month	Jan	Feb	Mar	Apr	May	Jun	Jul	Aug	Sep	Oct	Nov	Dec	Year
Record high °C (°F)	7.5 (45.5)	7.8 (46.0)	16.7 (62.1)	30.0 (86.0)	37.0 (98.6)	37.0 (98.6)	36.5 (97.7)	36.1 (97.0)	36.5 (97.7)	28.5 (83.3)	20.6 (69.1)	9.5 (49.1)	37.0 (98.6)
Mean daily maximum °C (°F)	−12.6 (9.3)	−8.9 (16.0)	−1.8 (28.8)	9.1 (48.4)	16.9 (62.4)	21.9 (71.4)	24.8 (76.6)	24.0 (75.2)	17.5 (63.5)	9.1 (48.4)	−1.6 (29.1)	−9.9 (14.2)	7.4 (45.3)
Daily mean °C (°F)	−18.3 (−0.9)	−14.9 (5.2)	−7.5 (18.5)	3.0 (37.4)	10.0 (50.0)	15.8 (60.4)	18.6 (65.5)	17.5 (63.5)	11.5 (52.7)	3.9 (39.0)	−6.0 (21.2)	−14.8 (5.4)	1.6 (34.9)
Mean daily minimum °C (°F)	−23.9 (−11.0)	−20.8 (−5.4)	−13.3 (8.1)	−3.2 (26.2)	3.2 (37.8)	9.6 (49.3)	12.3 (54.1)	10.9 (51.6)	5.4 (41.7)	−1.3 (29.7)	−10.3 (13.5)	−19.7 (−3.5)	−4.3 (24.3)
Record low °C (°F)	−45.6 (−50.1)	−48.3 (−54.9)	−42.2 (−44.0)	−29.5 (−21.1)	−14.0 (6.8)	−5.0 (23.0)	1.1 (34.0)	−2.0 (28.4)	−7.8 (18.0)	−21.0 (−5.8)	−40.0 (−40.0)	−41.1 (−42.0)	−48.3 (−54.9)
Average precipitation mm (inches)	16.9 (0.67)	12.4 (0.49)	24.9 (0.98)	25.9 (1.02)	55.4 (2.18)	80.9 (3.19)	70.3 (2.77)	68.9 (2.71)	53.4 (2.10)	43.9 (1.73)	27.0 (1.06)	19.7 (0.78)	499.4 (19.66)
Average snowfall cm (inches)	16.9 (6.7)	10.1 (4.0)	15.3 (6.0)	7.8 (3.1)	1.2 (0.5)	0.0 (0.0)	0.0 (0.0)	0.0 (0.0)	0.4 (0.2)	6.9 (2.7)	18.3 (7.2)	18.7 (7.4)	95.6 (37.6)
Source: Environment Canada

Climate data for Gimli, Manitoba
Month	Jan	Feb	Mar	Apr	May	Jun	Jul	Aug	Sep	Oct	Nov	Dec	Year
Record high °C (°F)	8.2 (46.8)	8.1 (46.6)	15.0 (59.0)	29.2 (84.6)	36.1 (97.0)	36.7 (98.1)	35.0 (95.0)	37.5 (99.5)	36.5 (97.7)	26.1 (79.0)	22.8 (73.0)	6.3 (43.3)	37.5 (99.5)
Mean daily maximum °C (°F)	−12.8 (9.0)	−9.3 (15.3)	−1.8 (28.8)	8.2 (46.8)	16.3 (61.3)	21.6 (70.9)	24.9 (76.8)	23.2 (73.8)	16.9 (62.4)	9.5 (49.1)	−1.1 (30.0)	−10.5 (13.1)	7.1 (44.8)
Daily mean °C (°F)	−18.2 (−0.8)	−14.8 (5.4)	−7.3 (18.9)	2.7 (36.9)	10.6 (51.1)	16.1 (61.0)	19.2 (66.6)	17.5 (63.5)	11.6 (52.9)	4.8 (40.6)	−5.2 (22.6)	−15.4 (4.3)	1.8 (35.2)
Mean daily minimum °C (°F)	−23.5 (−10.3)	−20.3 (−4.5)	−12.8 (9.0)	−2.9 (26.8)	4.7 (40.5)	10.5 (50.9)	13.5 (56.3)	11.8 (53.2)	6.3 (43.3)	0.0 (32.0)	−9.2 (15.4)	−20.3 (−4.5)	−3.5 (25.7)
Record low °C (°F)	−41.2 (−42.2)	−39.4 (−38.9)	−34.4 (−29.9)	−25.6 (−14.1)	−9.5 (14.9)	−1.3 (29.7)	2.8 (37.0)	0.5 (32.9)	−15.8 (3.6)	−16.4 (2.5)	−34.3 (−29.7)	−39.4 (−38.9)	−41.2 (−42.2)
Average precipitation mm (inches)	22.2 (0.87)	17.3 (0.68)	30.0 (1.18)	30.0 (1.18)	49.8 (1.96)	94.1 (3.70)	69.7 (2.74)	64.2 (2.53)	66.7 (2.63)	38.3 (1.51)	27.6 (1.09)	22.5 (0.89)	532.5 (20.96)
Average rainfall mm (inches)	0.3 (0.01)	0.3 (0.01)	8.8 (0.35)	19.8 (0.78)	47.6 (1.87)	94.1 (3.70)	69.7 (2.74)	64.2 (2.53)	65.6 (2.58)	30.3 (1.19)	5.3 (0.21)	1.8 (0.07)	407.8 (16.06)
Average snowfall cm (inches)	27.6 (10.9)	21.7 (8.5)	24.1 (9.5)	11.4 (4.5)	2.2 (0.9)	0 (0)	0 (0)	0 (0)	1.1 (0.4)	8.4 (3.3)	26.6 (10.5)	25.0 (9.8)	148.1 (58.3)
Average precipitation days (≥ 0.2 mm)	12.3	9.2	9.5	8.1	9.9	12.7	11.7	11.6	11.1	10.0	9.4	12.4	127.6
Average rainy days (≥ 0.2 mm)	0.30	0.35	2.5	5.6	9.5	12.7	11.7	11.6	10.9	8.2	2.3	0.53	76.1
Average snowy days (≥ 0.2 cm)	13.9	9.7	8.5	3.7	1.0	0.05	0	0	0.45	2.6	8.6	13.6	62.0
Mean monthly sunshine hours	119.3	141.2	190.3	247.5	284.4	289.6	319.1	271.8	174.8	141.1	94.9	102.4	2,376.4
Source: Environment Canada

== Demographics ==
=== Major communities ===
Name of Population Centre	Population (2021)
Arborg	1,279
Ashern	616
Eriksdale	846
Fisher Branch	465
Gimli	2,345
Riverton	475
Selkirk	10,504
Stonewall	5,046
Teulon	1,201
Winnipeg Beach	1,145

=== Census subdivisions ===
The Interlake Economic Region is made of three subdivisions according to Statistics Canada which includes Divisions No. 13, No. 14, and No. 18.

Division No.	Population (2021)	Area Km2
No. 13	51,643	1,662.28
No. 14	19,749	2,833.41
No. 18	26,636	11,362.44
Totals	98,028	15,858.13

== See also ==
- Interlake-Gimli — provincial electoral district
  - Interlake — former provincial electoral district
- Selkirk-Interlake — federal electoral district
