= Lögberg-Heimskringla =

Icelandic newspaper in Canada

- Type: Icelandic-Canadian community newspaper
- Format: semi-monthly (formerly weekly)
- Founder(s): Frimann B. Anderson (Heimskringla, 1886)
- Editor: Stefan M. Jonasson
- Staff writers: see http://www.lh-inc.ca/whatisLH.asp
- Founded: October 7, 1886 (Heimskringla) and January 14, 1888 (Lögberg)
- Language: English and formerly Icelandic
- Headquarters: Winnipeg, Manitoba
- ISSN: 0047-4967
- Website: www.lh-inc.ca

Lögberg-Heimskringla is a community newspaper serving the Icelandic community in North America. A former weekly, it is currently published twice per month in Winnipeg, Canada. The newspaper was created in 1959 by the amalgamation of two newspapers, the Heimskringla and the Lögberg, which had been in publication in North America since the 1880s.

== History ==
=== Background ===
Icelandic immigration to North America actually began in the 1850s. The main immigration began in 1870 with a small group of people immigrating to North America, and continued on a much larger scale through 1914 and later. Iceland has always been a very literate country, arguably fostering the largest number of poets per capita of any country in the world.

The very first newspaper to be published in North America by the Icelandic immigrant population was handwritten by Jon Gudmundsson in 1876, and was called Nýi Þjóðólfur. In 1877, the first edition of a newspaper printed on a printing press, Framfari was published on September 1 at Lundi. The need for Icelandic language publications was felt keenly by the immigrants, who felt it important from the beginning to preserve both their language and their culture. This was followed by "Leifur" and several other publications.

=== Heimskringla newspaper ===
The first of the larger Icelandic weeklies was Heimskringla. Heimskringla derived its name from the sagas of the Norse Kings, written in the early 13th century by Icelandic poet and historian Snorri Sturlusson. It is an amalgamation of the first two words of one of the historic manuscripts, Ynglinga Saga which are "kringla heimsins", meaning "the round world".

The founder of the newspaper was Frimann B. Anderson, who worked with Eggert Johannsson and Einar Hjörleifsson on the publication, which first appeared on September 9, 1886. In the first issue, the paper commits to cover the interests of Icelanders in the west, including public affairs, employment, and education. It vows to keep Western Icelanders in touch with the politics and culture of their homeland. It states that it will be politically independent, and would include works of fiction and poetry. It said, however, that it would not be an agent of immigration.

The paper‘s early days were fraught with problems, both of personality clashes and financial difficulties. There was a period from December 16, 1886 when the paper did not publish again until April 7, 1887. Heimskringla had its ups and downs financially and with a series of editors through March, 1898, when Baldvin L. Baldwinson became publisher and editor. His management skills were good and the paper prospered under him. After its first year, Heimskringla became Conservative in Canadian politics and Democratic in United States politics, and espoused liberal religious views. Baldvin L. Baldwinson remained with Heimskringla until April 17, 1913.

=== Lögberg newspaper ===
Partly as a result of Icelandic immigrants having aligned themselves with different political parties and religions, there became a demand for another newspaper as a competitor for Heimskringla'. On January 14, 1888 the new Lögberg was launched by six men – Sigtryggur Jónasson, Bergvin Jónsson, Arni Frederickson, Einar Hjörleifsson (formerly of Heimskringla), Ólafur Thorgeirsson, and Sigurdur J. Johannesson. The name of the paper means, literally, "Law Rock" and refers to the rock on which the speaker of the ancient Althing in Iceland read the codified laws out loud. Lögberg emphasized its ties with the now-defunct Framfari and with Leifur, also defunct. It stated from the outset that if only one Icelandic weekly could survive, then the better of the two would remain.

The first editor of Lögberg was Einar Hjörleifsson, who remained in his position until February 1895 and then returned to Iceland. During his editorship, he had strengthened Icelandic cultural groups in Winnipeg, taking part in many events. He was also a brilliant translator of books, poems, and short stories from English to Icelandic, publishing them in the paper.

The paper began with exactly the same format as its rival, Heimskringla. It was four pages long. On January 15, 1890 Lögberg increased its size to eight pages, doubling that of Heimskringla. A regular women´s interest column, edited by Ingibjorg Jonsson, was introduced in Lögberg in the 1950s.

== Amalgamation ==
Both newspapers, Heimskringla and Lögberg were important influences in keeping the Icelandic community in North America informed about communities in other places, politics and culture in their homeland, literature, religion, and politics in North America. In both newspapers, different editors had different ideas and focus and varied the newspapers in coverage during their tenure. Both newspapers stressed the importance of loyalty to their readers' North American communities and countries. It was rare to find an Icelandic home in North America that did not subscribe to one or the other newspaper, and some subscribed to both. However, due to differences in the two papers regarding politics and religious stances, some people were either fiercely in the camp of Heimskringla or vice versa.

=== August 1959 amalgamation of Lögberg and Heimskringla ===
For several years prior to the actual amalgamation of the two weekly Icelandic newspapers, there was talk of such an amalgamation. However, this concept was not accepted at the time. Dr. P.H.T. Thorlakson on behalf of Lögberg, and Senator G.S. Thorvaldson on behalf of Heimskringla, had been conducting negotiations for amalgamation during this time. The amalgamation finally took place as a result of finances. Both newspapers needed to apply for funds from the Canada Iceland Foundation, which was considered to be too much. The Icelandic Canadian journal was also supported by that Foundation.

The amalgamation was finally achieved by a voluntary committee of five – Stefan Hansen, Chairman, Consul Grettir I. Johannson, Judge W. J. Lindal, Rev. Philip M. Petursson, and Dr. P.H. T. Thorlakson. The North American Publishing Company was formed, which took over the assets of both newspapers. The president of the company was Arni G. Eggertson. An editorial committee was formed. Dr. P.H.T. Thorlakson was the chairman, and Ingibjorg Jónsson was named editor, a post she held from August 20, 1959 until April 29, 1971. Both Dr. Thorlakson and Judge Lindal wrote articles about the amalgamation. Dr. Thorlakson‘s article appeared in the Lögberg-Heimskringla’s inaugural issue on August 20, 1959. Judge Lindal’s article appeared in The Icelandic Canadian’s Fall 1959 issue.

As for the combination of the two names, it was decided to keep both names for their emotional impact, and to use Lögberg first, because it sounded better that way. It was decided at the time, that the newspaper would remain in the Icelandic language and be an instrument of the preservation of the language among immigrants from Iceland and their families. The Icelandic Canadian magazine would fulfill the role of an English-language publication of Icelandic heritage interest. However, English-language articles began to appear immediately. In the inaugural issue of Lögberg-Heimskringla on August 20, 1959, the article written by Dr. P H. T. Thorlakson about the amalgamation was written in English, and appeared on the front page of the new newspaper.

By August 1, 1980, the newspaper was almost all in the English language, with Icelandic articles interspersed. By August 31, 1990, the only Icelandic language articles were on the last page of the publication. Ten years after that, in August 2000, there were no longer any Icelandic language articles in Lögberg-Heimskringla. This remains the case up to the present day, and is largely a reflection of the families of the original immigrants from Iceland having become predominantly English-speaking.

== Modern times ==
The newspaper depends on subscriptions, advertisements, paid notices, donations, and government grants from both Iceland and Canada.

From time-to-time, Icelandic lessons have been included in the paper by various editors.

Subscribers live in many countries, but are mostly located in Canada, the United States of America, and Iceland. For approximately one year in 2000 the newspaper had an office in Gimli, Manitoba with the production still being done in Winnipeg. In 2001 the office was moved back to Winnipeg, where it remains today.

In January, 2004 the newspaper began publishing every two weeks rather than on a weekly basis, and with a 16-page format. In October, 2011 the paper celebrated its 125th birthday – the anniversary of the first edition of Heimskringla. This publication is the oldest continually publishing newspaper in Canada.

The newspaper is now available in an online subscription as well as in the regular newspaper format. In print, the paper is currently published on the 1st and 15th day of each month.

== See also ==
- Canada-Iceland relations
- Iceland-United States relations
- Icelandic American
- Icelandic Canadian
- List of newspapers in Canada
