= Bjarnason =

Bjarnason is a surname of Icelandic origin, meaning son of Bjarni. In Icelandic names, the name is not strictly a surname, but a patronymic. The name may refer to:

- Ágúst H. Bjarnason (1875–1952), Icelandic psychologist, professor, and author
- Birkir Bjarnason (born 1988), Icelandic professional football player
- Bjarni Bjarnason (author) (born 1965), Icelandic author and poet
- Bjarni Bjarnason (murderer) (1761-1805), Icelander who murdered his wife in 1802
- Björn Bjarnason (born 1944), Icelandic politician, Minister of Justice and Ecclesiastical Affairs since 2003
- Brynjólfur Bjarnason (1898–?), Icelandic communist politician
- Dóra S. Bjarnason (1947–2020), Icelandic sociologist and educator
- Lára Bjarnason (1842 – 1921), Icelandic-Canadian teacher and social activist
- Ólafur Örn Bjarnason (born 1975), Icelandic professional football player
- Teddy Bjarnason (born 1987), Icelandic professional football player

== See also ==
- Bjarnason Island
