= Icelandic Festival of Manitoba =

Cultural festival in Gimli, Manitoba, Canada

Icelandic Festival in Manitoba Islendingadagurinn
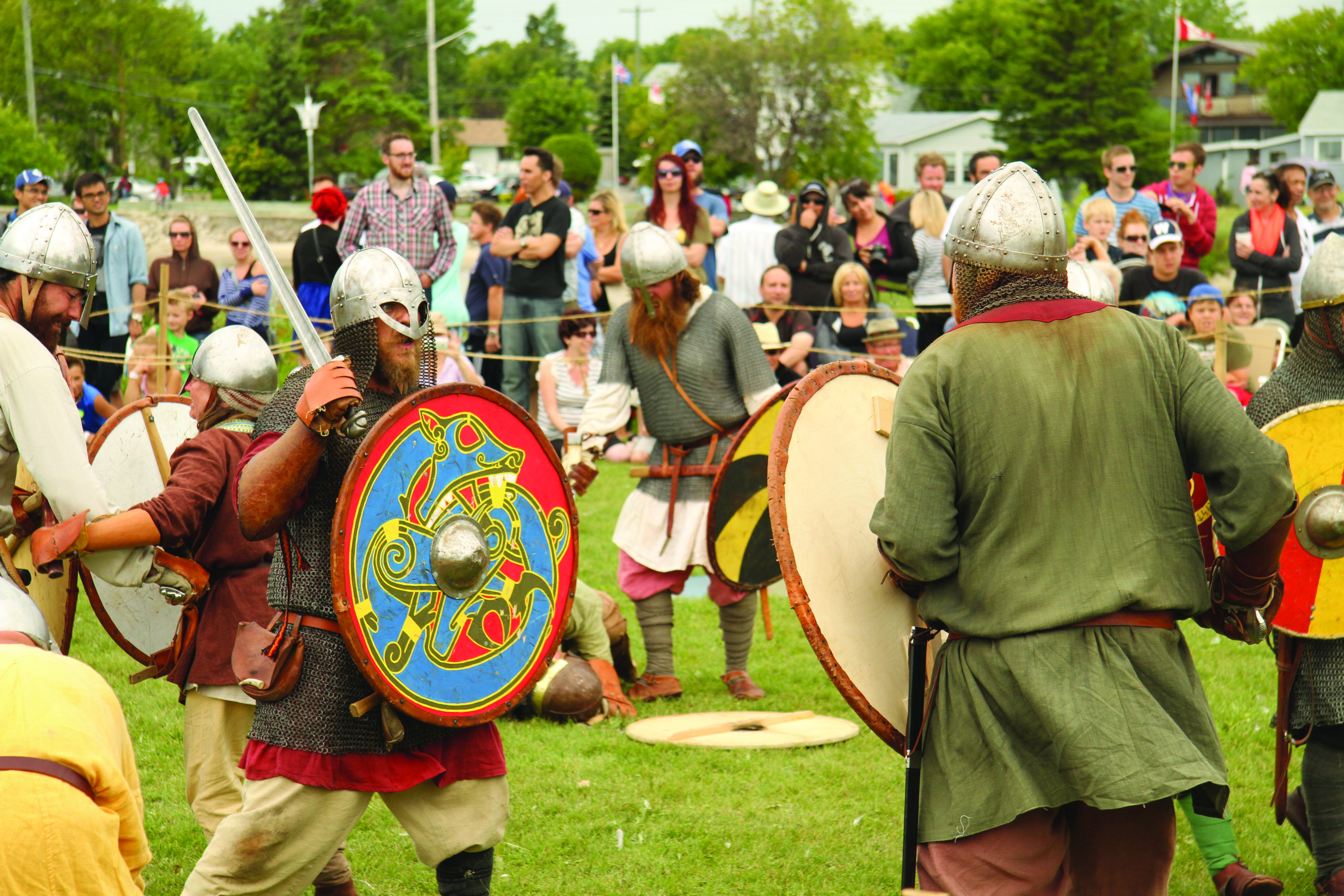
- Reenactment of a Norse battle during the Icelandic Festival in Gimli.
- Frequency: Annual
- Location: Gimli, Manitoba
- Established: August 2, 1890; 136 years ago
- Website: icelandicfestival.com

The Icelandic Festival of Manitoba (also known as Islendingadagurinn, Icelandic for 'Icelander's Day') is an annual festival of Icelandic culture, held in Gimli, Manitoba, Canada, and thought to be the oldest Icelandic festival in North America. It is held for three days during the first weekend of August, i.e., the Terry Fox Day long weekend.

Having been celebrated since 1890, and held in Gimli since 1932, organizers of the festival believe it to be the second oldest continuous ethnic festival in North America. (Only an Irish festival held annually in Montreal, Quebec, is a few years older.) The festival is now visited by several thousand tourists each year. The community of Gimli, part of the broader region of New Iceland, is home to the largest concentration of Icelanders outside of Iceland.

== History ==
=== 19th century ===
The first Icelandic festival in North America was held in Milwaukee, Wisconsin, in 1874.

The first Manitoba Icelandic Festival Parade was held on August 2, 1890, at 10:30 a.m. on Nena Street (now Sherbrooke Street) in Winnipeg, south of the First Lutheran Church.

It was led by the Infantry School Band, followed by men, then teenagers and children. Most women, however, rode in rented carriages to avoid the muddy roads caused by a large rainstorm the day before. The parade would finish around 11:30, followed by games and sports events, with actual celebration beginning at 2:30 p.m.

The first president of the festival was Wilhelm Paulson.

Though the first parade was held on August 2, Manitoba's Icelandic community could not agree on an official date or name for the festival for future celebrations. July 16 was debated as a good date, as that was the day that Icelandic explorers in 1875 reached Winnipeg. However, this date had no significance to Icelanders in Iceland, who the organizers did not want to alienate from the celebrations.

During a meeting on May 28, 1898, at the Northwest Hall, the organizers chose August 2 to be the date for the festival due to its historical significance for both North America and Iceland. It was on this day, in 1874, that the first Icelandic celebration in North America had taken place, and, in Iceland, a new constitution had been granted.

=== Early 20th century ===
In 1924, the tradition of selecting a woman to be the Fjallkona ('Maid of the Mountain') began, wherein the Fjallkona is Iceland, and her children are the Icelanders. A woman named Sigrun Lindal became the first Fjallkona of Islendingadagurinn.

In 1932, in its 42nd year, the festival moved to Gimli, Manitoba. Though originally just an experimental move, the community evidently became the permanent location of the festival.

One of the main benefits to the relocation was that it brought the festival closer to the Icelandic communities of not only Gimli, which is home to the largest concentration of Icelanders outside of Iceland, but also Selkirk, Arborg, and Hnausa. Another benefit was that Gimli Park offered more outdoor space and shelter than parks in Winnipeg.

Initially, a major issue that arose with the relocation was arranging transportation to Gimli from Winnipeg. As such, the festival committee arranged with Winnipeg Electric Co. to supply 3 large buses for CA$125, and additional buses at $35 each, for transportation to the festival. The Canadian Pacific Railway also agreed to offering return fares at a cost of $1.25 per person.

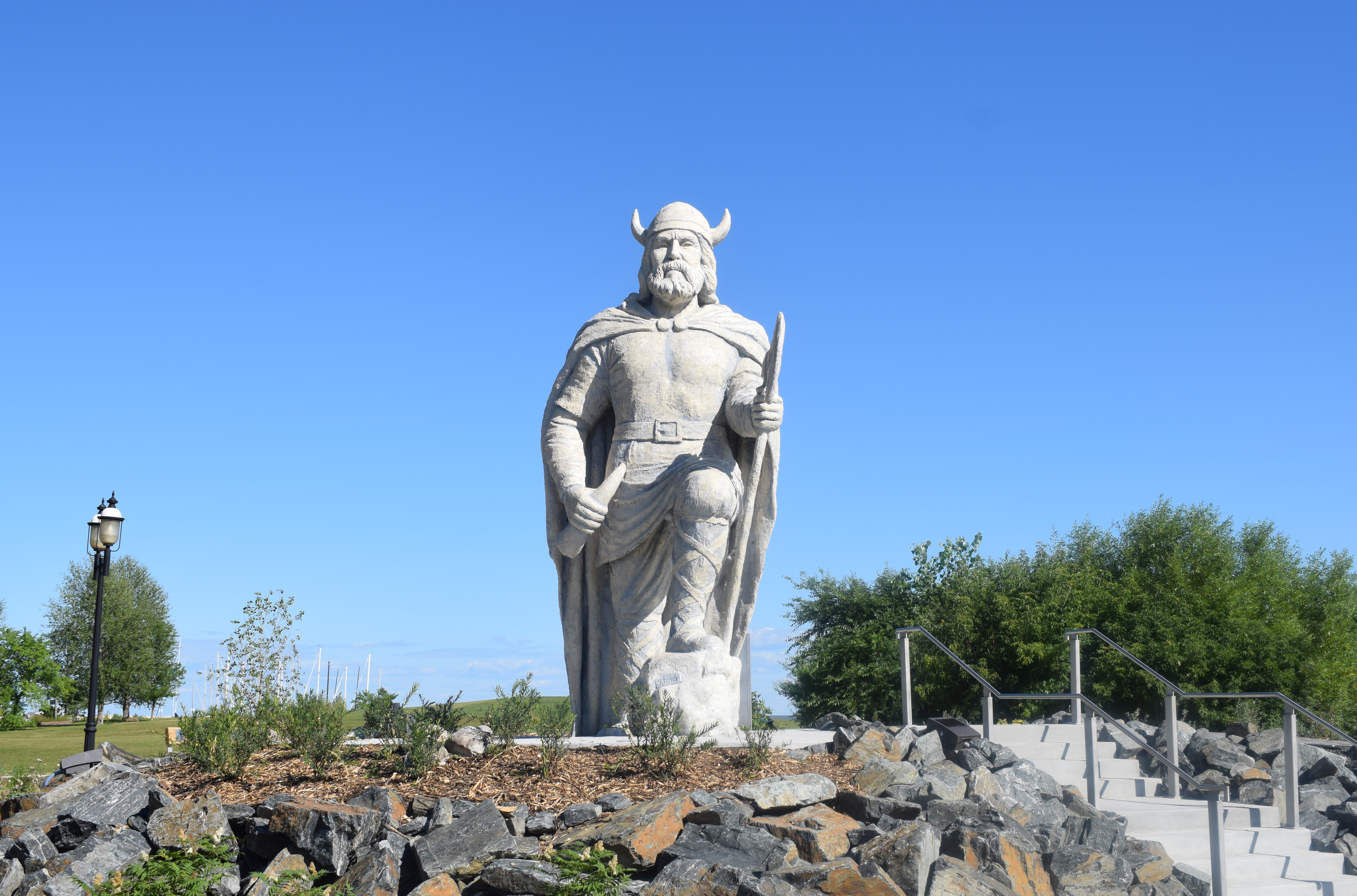
Viking statue in Gimli's Viking Park.

=== Recent history ===
In the 1960s, a 4.6-metre (15 ft) fibreglass statue of a Viking was erected in Gimli for the Canadian Centennial. The statue was unveiled in 1967 by then-President of Iceland Ásgeir Ásgeirsson. Fifty years later, in recognition of the Icelandic Festival's 125th anniversary and in honour of Canada's 150th birthday, a new Viking Park around the statue was unveiled on 5 August 2017.

=== Past presidents ===
Presidents of the Icelandic Festival
Year(s)	President
1880	Wilhelm Paulson
1891	Sigtryggur Jonasson
1982	Paul S. Bardal
1893-96	Arni Frederickson
1897-99	Baldwin Baldwinson
1900	Skapti Brynjolfsson
1901-03	Sigfus Anderson
1904-05	Baldwin Baldwinson
1906	Skapti Brynjolfsson
1907	John J. Vopni
1908	Sigfus Anderson
1909	Thordur Johnson
1910	Arni Eggertson
1911	Olafur S. Thorgeirsson
1912	Joseph B. Skaptason
1913-14	Thomas H. Johnson (Hon. 1915)
1915	Hannes Marino Hannesson
1916-17	Dr. B. J. Brandson
1918	Dr. M. B. Halldorson
1919	John J. Vopni
1920	Throsteinn S. Borgford
1921	Hannes Pétursson
1922	J.J. Bildfell
1923	Hannes Pétursson
1924	Thordur Johnson
1925	Bjorn Petrusson
1926-29	John J. Samson
1930-31	Rev. Runolfur Marteinsson
1932-33	Dr. August Blondal
1934	Rev. J.P. Solmundsson
1935-36	Gunnar Thorvaldson
1937	Fridrik Sveinsson
1938-39	John J. Samson
1940	Sveinn Palmason
1941-42	Dr. B. J. Brandson
1943-44	Hannes Pétursson
1945	G.F. Jonasson
1946-48	Steindor Jakobsson
1949-52	Rev. V.J.Eylands
1953	Jón K. Laxdal
1954	Barney Egilson
1955-56	W. Snorri Jonasson
1957-58	Eric Stefanson
1959	Prof. Haraldur Bessason
1960-61	Helgi Johnson
1962-63	Jón J. Árnason
1964-65	S. Aleck Thorarinson
1966-67	Eric Stefanson
1968-69	Jakob F. Kristjansson
1970-71	B. Valdimar Arnason
1972	Brian L. Jakobson
1973-74	Dennis N. Stefanson
1975-76	Ted K. Arnason
1977-78	Ernest Stefanson
1979-80	Terence P.J. Tergesen
1981-82	Maurice C. Eylofson
1983-84	Harald K. Goodmanson
1985-86	S. Glenn Sigurdson
1987	Brian L. Jakobson
1988-89	Lorna J. Tergesen
1990-91	Frederick W. Isford
1992-93	Arthur P. Kilgour
1994-95	Larry Markusson
1996-97	Connie Magnusson-Shimnowski
1998-99	Susie Erickson Jakobson
2000-01	Harley Jonasson
2002-03	Timothy G. Arnason
2004-05	Sandra Sigurdson
2006-07	Tami (Jakobson) Schirlie
2008-09	Robert Arnason
2010-11	Kathi Thorarinson-Neal
2012-13	Janice Arnason
2014-15	Cameron Arnason
2016-17	Robert Rousseau
2018-19	Grant Stefanson
2020-22	Jenna Boholij

== Festivities ==
Artworks from jewellery to paintings are displayed at the art museum as well along the pier wall that extends from downtown Gimli into the lake, and traditional Icelandic dishes are offered. A reenactment of a Norse shield wall battle is also held each day, being accompanied by an interactive Norse village where the reenactors perform tasks such as blacksmithing, crafting, and sewing.

The festival has a tradition of selecting a woman to be the Fjallkona ('Maid of the Mountain'), wherein the Fjallkona is Iceland, and her children are the Icelanders. At the festival, the selected woman sits on her elevated throne, clad in a formal Icelandic costume of a white gown, green robe with ermine, golden belt, high-crowned headdress, and white veil falling over the shoulders to the waist. Two maids of honour, formerly clad in plain Icelandic costume with tasseled skullcaps, are dressed in white. In former years, these maids of honour were known as Miss Canada and Miss America.

== See also ==
- Icelandic Canadians
