= Indriði Indriðason =

Icelandic medium

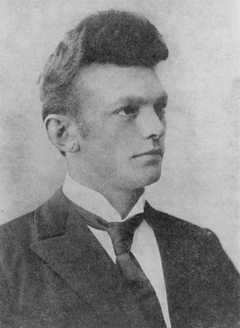
- Born: 12 October 1883
- Died: 31 August 1912 (aged 28); Garðabær, Iceland
- Occupation: Spiritualist medium

Indriði Indriðason (12 October 1883 – 31 August 1912) was an Icelandic spiritualist medium. He was the first medium documented in Iceland and his discovery was a major impetus to the establishment of spiritualism there.

== Life ==
Indriði was raised on a remote farm and was uneducated. At 22, he moved to Reykjavík to work at a newspaper as a printer's apprentice. The wife of the relative at whose house he was living was interested in the Experimental Society that Einar Hjörleifsson Kvaran had established to investigate spiritualist claims; early in 1905 she brought him with her to a session and when he participated in a table-tilting experiment, she claimed the table moved "violently".

The Experimental Society was formalized in fall 1905 in order to investigate Indriði. It paid him a salary and he was required not to give séances without its permission. He moved into Kvaran's home, and then in 1907 the Society built an Experimental House for him to provide maximally controlled conditions for observing him. He lived there with a theology student. After a visit to the Westman Islands in September 1907, according to Spiritualists, he was increasingly troubled by poltergeist phenomena and members of the Society had to spend the night in the room.

Starting in spring 1905, Indriði complained that he did not like the experiments, "and in fact never had, as he felt drained and tired as a result of them. He started to sleep badly, complained about headaches, and became a bit depressed. He planned to go to America and leave the circle for good.". In context "America" meant New Iceland in Canada. He fell ill then, and experienced a sudden serious illness in February the next year. In summer 1909 he visited his parents and he and his fiancée, Jóna Guðnadóttir, caught typhoid fever. She died; Indriði never fully recovered and did not participate in any further research. He married someone else, but their daughter died before her second birthday, and Indriði himself died of tuberculosis in the Vífilsstaðir sanatorium on 31 August 1912.

== Mediumship ==
According to proponents, Indriði had immediate success with automatic writing. He first entered a trance later in spring 1905. He claimed to see shadowy beings, of whom he was afraid.

In November 1905, he was allegedly able to levitate. According to Spiritualist accounts, Indriði himself sometimes bumped his head on the ceiling and complained about hurting his head, and on at least two occasions the neighbors' complaints about noise when he crashed back to the floor required relocating the experiments to someone else's apartment. Allegedly a control personality emerged who claimed to be Konráð Gíslason, Indriði's grandfather's brother, who had been a professor of Icelandic language at the University of Copenhagen.

Spiritualist believers claimed that in the first year of experimentation, knocks were heard on the wall and lights manifested, initially as flashes or spots in the air or on walls, up to 58 at a time, of various sizes, shapes, and colors, and in early December 1905, a man appeared in the light. Their accounts report that the lights, which "as in all his major phenomena, seemed to cause [Indriði] much pain," so that he would "shriek and scream" and complain after the séances that he "felt as if he had been beaten up," stopped at Christmas but resumed in December 1906, when a man again appeared in the light and claimed to be a discarnate Dane named Mr. Jensen. The man supposedly appeared several times in a pillar of light that observers described as very beautiful, while Indriði this time sat in a trance. Proponents defend the genuineness of the phenomena, saying that no equipment capable of producing the lights was available in Reykjavík, and the Kvarans attested that Indriði had only a single footlocker with no lock, and they and others searched him and kept him under observation.

Spiritualists claim that on his first appearance, Jensen spoke audibly, asking "in a typical Copenhagen accent" whether people could see him and that he was also palpable: he attempted to touch people and let them touch him. According to their accounts, in January 1908, a being named Sigmundur manifested, audible at some distance from Indriði. Spiritualists report that after that there were occasions when several voices were heard around Indriði while he was visiting his fiancée on a farm, including one outdoors in broad daylight when multiple different voices spoke to him and each other, in immediate succession and even simultaneously. Proponents say that an observer who suspected him of ventriloquism reported that he once heard a male and female voice singing simultaneously in a skillful and trained manner, a supposedly impossible feat for Indriði, who was described as an untrained singer who used to sing in the cathedral choir. Believers cited an anecdotal story that a friend tried to trap Indriði by singing a duet with one of the voices and setting the pitch uncomfortably high, but concluded it was "very improbable that there was in the whole town a singer who could" have sung as well as the voice did.

Spiritualists considered Indriði primarily a physical medium, and say he correctly reported pieces of information, such as a big fire in Copenhagen.

In winter 1906–07, the Society held "apport séances" in Kvaran's home during which Indriði allegedly materialized objects from all over Reykjavík. He himself was also reportedly teleported from one locked room to another on one occasion.

Proponents claim that Indriði's left arm "dematerialized" several times in December 1906 and that up to seven witnesses at a time swore that they could not find it, even striking matches and shining lights on his body.

After Indriði's visit to the Westman Islands in September 1907, Spiritualists say he was plagued by poltergeist and levitation phenomena that he and his controls attributed to a man named Jón, whom he had seen and made insulting remarks about. Supposedly, Indriði and the wicker chair he was sitting in were carried over two rows of people; the harmonium moved while the organist was playing it; at night, Indriði's bed and Indriði himself were levitated. According to the story, observers were unable to hold his legs down or on one occasion to prevent his being dragged into another room. It was claimed that objects were thrown around the bedroom of the Experimental House and to a lesser extent at Kvaran's house, breaking lamps and wash-basins and causing the observers to grab Indriði and flee. According to Haraldur Níelsson's account to the Second International Congress for Psychical Research, Jón was thought to be a recent suicide.

Proponents dismissed accusations of fraud against Indriði as not coming from first-hand witnesses. Believers included Guðmundur Hannesson, founder of the Icelandic Scientific Society and twice president of the University of Iceland. Another was Haraldur Níelsson, a Spiritist and active member of the Spiritualist Society of Iceland, who was at the time the nephew of the Bishop of Iceland and wrote on Indriði and presented on him at international Spiritualist conferences.

== Criticism ==
The Experimental Society's claims of Indriði's alleged abilities were the topics of controversy in the Icelandic press. Fjallkonen condemned a supposed "healing operation" in which an individual died after Indriði attempted to cure him of cancer, as "outrageous" and an "offense". Reykjavik described Indriði as an "unstable, unreliable charlatan". Later, when Kvaren and Indriði went on lecture tours, the newspaper accused them of cheating and misrepresentation. Kvaren and other proponents responded by saying the accusations were religiously motivated and untrue, and claimed that Indriði had genuine paranormal abilities.

Newspapers of the time continued to publish scathing critiques of Indriði, describing Spiritualism as "ludicrous ghost-religion" and "nonsensical, ridiculous vanity". Modern day religious scholars consider Indriði's widespread popularity responsible for launching the Spiritualist movement in Iceland in the early 20th century, and Indriði proponent's views, such as Haraldur Níelsson's, as "an eccentric mix of scientific and supernatural beliefs typical of Spiritualism worldwide".

Antônio da Silva Mello has criticized the experiments conducted with Indriðason as non-scientific. He noted they were performed in the dark and it was suspicious as Indriðason refused to take off his shirt so his body could be examined after a séance.

== Sources ==
- Guðmundur Hannesson. "Remarkable phenomena in Iceland." Journal of the American Society for Psychical Research 18 (1924) 239–72. Translation of: "Í Svartaskóla." Norðurland 10, 11 (21 December 1910, 21 January 1911). Repr. Morgunn 32 (1951), Satt 21 (1973).
- Haraldur Níelsson. (1922) "Some of my experiences with a physical medium in Reykjavík." Le Compte Rendu Officiel du Premier Congrès International des Recherches Psychiques à Copenhague. Copenhagen: Secrétariat international des Congrès de Recherches psychiques. 450–65.
- Haraldur Níelsson. "Poltergeist phenomena." Light 29 September 1923. 615.
- Haraldur Níelsson. "Poltergeist phenomena in connection with a medium observed for a length of time, some of them in full light." L'État Actuel des Recherches Psychiques d'après les Travaux du 2me Congrès International tenu à Varsovie en 1923 en l'Honneur du Dr. Julien Ochorowicz. Paris: Presses Universitaires de France, 1924. 148–68.
- Haraldur Níelsson. "Poltergeist phenomena." Psychic Science 4 (1925) 90–111.
- Loftur Reimar Gissurarson. "Indriði Indriðason miðill." B.A. thesis, University of Iceland. 1984.
- Loftur Reimar Gissurarson and Erlendur Haraldsson. The Icelandic Physical Medium Indridi Indridason. Proceedings of the Society for Psychical Research Part 214, 1989. ISBN 0-900677-02-3.
- Swatos, William H.; Gissurarson, Loftur Reimar (1997). Icelandic Spiritualism: Mediumship and Modernity in Iceland. New Brunswick, NJ: Transaction. p. 79. ISBN 1-56000-273-5.
