= Magnús J. Skaptason =

Icelandic priest and editor (1850–1932)

Magnús J. Skaptason (born 4 February 1850, died Winnipeg, 8 March 1932) was an Icelandic priest and newspaper editor, noted for his activities among the Icelandic community in Canada.

== Life and thought ==
Magnús's mother was Anna Margrét (whose own father was Björn Ólsen of Þingeyri) and his father Dr. Jósep Skaptason (1802–75) of Hnausar in Vatnsdalur.

In 1875, Magnús was ordained a priest of the Lutheran Church of Iceland, a year after graduating from Iceland's Lutheran seminary.

In winter 1887, Magnús emigrated from Hvammur í Laxárdal to New Iceland, in Canada, at the request of New Iceland's Lutheran brotherhood. There he served New Iceland's Lutheran congregation alongside Jón Bjarnason (who, during 1877–80, was Magnús's predecessor, and from 1884 was pastor of Winnipeg's First Lutheran Church). Magnús officiated in Árnes, Gimli, Fljótsbyggð, Hekla, Hnausa, and Víðirnes. Magnús's work inspired more active worship, fundraising, and the improvement of local Church facilities. From 1889 his home also hosted Hnausa Post Office.

Magnús grew increasingly dissatisfied with Icelandic Lutheran thought, however. On Easter Sunday 1891, he delivered a sermon in the Mikley Hekla church, renouncing the doctrine of total depravity, splitting the congregation, some of whom withdrew from the Icelandic Lutheran Synod in support of his views. On 13 April 1891, Magnús formally resigned from the Church, but his influence remained strong. "There remained a great deal of bitterness and hard feelings in the minds of some of the leaders, so much so that when the Icelandic Synod came to Gimli for its annual convention in 1901, opposition to it was still so strong that the church was padlocked by opponents of the Synod [...] A compromise was reached by which the Lutherans agreed to pay $100 to the disgruntled minority, and the convention was able to proceed as planned."

Magnús went on to join the Unitarian Church, serving its congregation in Winnipeg from 1894 to 1899. He later lived in Minnesota, before returning to Winnipeg. He edited the Winnipeg Icelandic newspaper Heimskringla 6 November 1914 – 8 March 1917.
