= Icelandic Americans =

Americans of Icelandic birth or descent

Íslenskir Bandaríkjamenn (Icelandic)
- Percent of the population with Icelandic ancestry by state

Total population
- 49,442 (2019)

Regions with significant populations
- Throughout much of the Western United States and Midwestern United States as well in parts of the Pacific Northwest
- California: 6,565
- Washington: 5,727
- Utah: 4,227
- Minnesota: 3,123
- North Dakota: 2,958
- Texas: 2,540
- Florida: 2,342
- Oregon: 1,814
- Colorado: 1,734
- New York: 1,517
- Virginia: 1,337
- Wisconsin: 1,325

Languages
- English, Icelandic

Religion
- Protestantism (Lutheranism)

Related ethnic groups
- Icelandic Canadians, Faroese Americans, Norwegian Americans, Scandinavian Americans, Icelanders, White Americans

The language spread of Icelandic in the United States

Icelandic Americans (Icelandic: Íslenskir Bandaríkjamenn) are Americans of Icelandic descent or Iceland-born people who reside in the United States. Icelandic immigrants came to the United States primarily in the period 1873–1905 and after World War II. There are more than 40,000 Icelandic Americans according to the 2000 U.S. census, and most live in the Upper Midwest. The United States is home to the second largest Icelandic diaspora community in the world after Canada.

== History ==
Norsemen from Greenland and Iceland were the first Europeans to reach North America in what is today Newfoundland, Canada, when the Icelander Leif Ericson reached North America via Norse settlements in Greenland around the year 1000, nearly five centuries before Columbus. It is generally accepted that the Norse settlers in Greenland founded the settlement of L'Anse aux Meadows in Vinland, their name for what is now Newfoundland, Canada.

Just how much they explored further past the Canadian Maritime Provinces in Canada has been a matter of debate for the past hundred years amongst romantic and ethnic nationalists as well as historians. In any case, the settlements were abandoned after a short time.

=== Post-Columbian settlement ===
After the Vikings, the first Icelanders to migrate to North America were three Mormons who left the Vestman Islands for Salt Lake City, Utah, in 1855 seeking religious freedom to follow Mormonism. Eleven Mormon converts left Iceland for North America between 1854 and 1857. A few years later nine Icelanders settled in the town of Spanish Fork, Utah, along with other Scandinavians. For the next 20 years, small groups of Icelanders joined the settlement from time to time. Thorarinn Haflidason Thorason and Gudmund Gudmundsson, Icelandic apprentices who had converted to Mormonism in Denmark and travelled to America in the 1850s, were typical of Icelandic emigrants coming to Utah. Skilled artisans, trades-persons, or farmers, the Icelandic emigrants brought with them useful skills for the frontier, although it was some time before they could use those skills in gainful employment.

The United States suffered an economic depression in the mid-1870s, and jobs were scarce. For newly arrived Icelanders who knew little, if any English, jobs were even more scarce. The secondary education most Icelanders had received in their homeland did little to help them find jobs in their new country.

Many Icelandic men took laboring jobs as unskilled factory workers and woodcutters, or as dockworkers in Milwaukee when they first arrived. Working to build capital and to learn farming techniques suitable for their new land so that they could start farms of their own, early Icelandic immigrant communities were largely agricultural. Drawing from their backgrounds in farming, the new immigrants maintained their ties to their Icelandic heritage.

=== Significant immigration waves ===
The last three decades of the 19th century saw the largest wave of Icelandic immigration. Between 1870 and 1900, about 15,000 of Iceland's population of 75,000 resettled in North America. Evidence suggests that around 17,000 emigrated but that roughly 2,000 returned to Iceland. The majority of these emigrants settled in Winnipeg, Manitoba, Canada, in a colony called New Iceland. Those coming to the United States settled primarily in the upper Midwest, especially Wisconsin, Minnesota, and the Dakota Territories. A sizable Icelandic immigrant community was also established in Utah.

William Wickmann, a Danish emigrant who had worked for a time in Eyrarbakki on the southern coast of Iceland before coming to Milwaukee in 1856, wrote letters to Iceland describing his new home. His descriptions of the plentiful life in Wisconsin were circulated among his Icelandic friends. In particular, Wickmann's accounts of the abundance of coffee, of which Icelanders were especially fond, proved irresistible to his friends. However, Icelandic emigration to the United States did not happen in any significant numbers until 1873 when the first emigration agency, the Allan Line, set up shop in Iceland. In 1870, four Icelanders left for Milwaukee, eventually settling on Washington Island in Lake Michigan, just off the Green Bay peninsula. 12 left in 1871, and 23 in 1872.

In 1874 a group of Icelandic immigrants proposed a settlement in Alaska, which they felt would provide a climate and terrain similar to that of Iceland. They managed to interest the United States government enough to assist them in visiting the proposed Alaskan site. Although the Icelanders wanted to follow through with the plan, the United States apparently lost interest in the project, and plans for a new colony were abandoned. Some of these found employment easier to get on Puget Sound in the state of Washington where they worked in the fishing and boatbuilding trades. These skills were brought over from Iceland. Washington still has the second highest population of Icelandic Americans among the states.

By 1878, over a hundred Icelanders from the Canadian colony, New Iceland, were forced to relocate because of severe weather conditions, outbreaks of smallpox, and religious disputes. Moving south to the United States, they joined more recent Icelandic immigrants in the northeastern section of the Dakota Territory. With the help of more established Norwegian and German immigrant groups, they formed what later became the largest Icelandic community in America. Mostly farmers and laborers, second and third generation Icelanders were drawn into journalism. Many entered politics.

There was also an Icelandic settlement in Watertown, South Dakota.

According to historian Gunnar Karlsson, "migration from Iceland is unique in that most went to Canada, whereas from most or all other European countries the majority went to the United States. This was partly due to the late beginning of emigration from Iceland after the Canadian authorities had begun to promote emigration in cooperation with the Allan Line, which already had an agent in Iceland in 1873. Contrary to most European countries, this promotion campaign was successful in Iceland, because emigration was only just about to start from there and Icelandic emigrants had no relatives in the United States to help them take the first steps."

=== 1900–1945 ===
By 1900, new immigration from Iceland had almost completely ceased. It is estimated that about 5,000 Icelanders had taken up residency in the United States by 1910. Icelandic emigration to the United States sharply dropped after the American Panic of 1907.

The exact number is difficult to determine, since until 1930, the United States census, unlike the Canadian census, did not differentiate between Icelanders and Danes. In 1910, however, the census reported that 5,105 U.S. residents had grown up in a home where Icelandic was spoken.

1,245 Icelanders, Icelandic Americans and Icelandic Canadians were registered as soldiers during World War I. 989 fought for Canada whereas 256 fought for the United States. 391 of the combatants were born in Iceland, the rest were of Icelandic descent. 10 women of Icelandic descent and 4 women born on Iceland served as nurses during World War I. At least 144 of the combatants died during World War I (96 in combat, 19 from wounds suffered during combat, 2 from accidents, and 27 from disease), 61 of them were born on Iceland. Ten men were taken as prisoners of war by the Germans.

== Settlement patterns and demographics ==
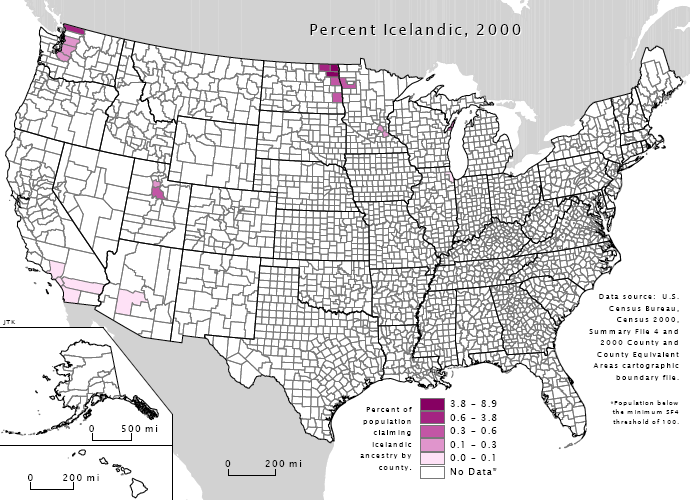
Areas of the US with high concentrations of Icelandic ethnic background.

Settlement patterns during the second half of the 19th century placed Icelanders mainly in the upper Midwestern states of Minnesota and Wisconsin, and in the Dakota Territory. By the end of the 20th century, settlement patterns had shifted from rural to urban communities. Early 20th-century industrialization transformed the United States from an agrarian culture into an urban one, affecting traditionally agrarian-based Icelandic communities. By 1970 over half of the second and third generations of Icelandic immigrants had taken up residence in urban areas.

The 1990 Census of the U.S. Department of Commerce revealed a total count of Icelandic-Americans and Icelandic nationals living in the United States as 40,529. Two-thirds of those lived in the West and the Midwest, with 19,891 in the West and 10,904 in the Midwest. Almost 6,000 lived in the South, while 4,140 resided in the Northeast. California, Washington state, and Minnesota were the most heavily populated with Icelanders and Icelandic-Americans. North Dakota was home to the fourth-largest number of persons with Icelandic backgrounds.

According to the 2000 U.S. Census, there were 42,716 Americans that claimed partial or full Icelandic ancestry, of which 6,760 were born outside of the United States. Also, in the Census 2000 report, 5,655 over the age of five spoke Icelandic at home. The Embassy of Iceland claims there are about 100,000 Americans of Icelandic ancestry.

Icelandic Americans tended to follow similar settlement patterns as Norwegian Americans but to a much smaller scale, with many in the Upper Midwest and Pacific Northwest, where many Americans of Scandinavian and German descent reside. There were some who converted to Mormonism (like many Danish Americans) and settled in Utah. Notable historical Icelandic settlements include Spanish Fork, Utah, the first permanent Icelandic settlement in the United States, and Washington Island, Wisconsin, the second Icelandic settlement and one of the largest outside of Iceland.

Reportedly, many Icelandic Americans are Lutheran. The Icelandic American community in Spanish Fork, Utah, was settled by Mormon Icelanders.

The states with the largest reported Icelandic Americans are:

California 6,000
Washington 5,976
Minnesota 3,165
North Dakota 3,161
Utah 2,970
Wisconsin 294
New York 1,427
Florida 1,348
Oregon 1,200
Ohio 1,156
Texas 1,147
Illinois 981

== Acculturation and assimilation ==
Iceland's language, customs, and historical background link it ethnically to Scandinavia, although Icelanders have always perceived themselves as having a distinct culture given the country's history and geographical distance from Scandinavia proper. These distinctions have seldom been clear to non-Icelanders, who have collapsed Icelandic culture into Danish, Swedish, or Norwegian cultures. Icelanders were not even accounted for as a separate category by the U.S. census until 1930. Few studies in English have concentrated on Icelanders, and many reference books have omitted them altogether from general accounts of ethnic distinctions such as holidays, customs, and dress.

Nonetheless, strong in their self-identity, Icelanders have from the beginning eagerly adopted new customs in the United States, learning English, holding public office, and integrating into the general culture. At the same time, they have retained a strong sense of ethnic pride, as evidenced in the large number of Icelandic-American organizations in existence throughout the United States since the founding of the Icelandic National League in 1919. Toward the end of the 20th century, widespread attention to multiculturalism kindled interest in understanding ethnic differences, spurring many Icelanders to reclaim their heritage.

== Notable people ==
- Jón Ólafsson, journalist, one of the first Icelanders to emigrate to the United States, was renowned for his attempt to establish a community for Icelandic American political dissidents on Kodiak Island in Alaska via petition to Ulysses S. Grant.
- Gunnar Hansen, actor, emigrated from Iceland at a young age, settling in Maine. The three-hundred-pound actor became famous for his classic role as the villain Leatherface in The Texas Chainsaw Massacre. Hansen reconnected with his Icelandic roots by starring in the 2009 Icelandic horror film Reykjavik Whale Watching Massacre.
- Leslie Stefanson, actress best known for playing the title role in The General's Daughter. She is the partner of James Spader.
- Helgi Tómasson, former ballet dancer and current artistic director for the San Francisco Ballet and its ballet school, is originally from Iceland.
- Aron Jóhannsson, born in Mobile, Alabama, to Icelandic parents, represented the United States in the 2014 World Cup.
- Erik Brynjolfsson, MIT economist, father was Icelandic.
- Bill Holm, writer.
- Heklina, drag performer
- Íeda Jónasdóttir Herman, author and adventurer.
- Sveinbjorn Johnson, lawyer.
- Richard Beck, literary historian.
- Nichole Leigh Mosty, American-born politician in Iceland.
- Indira Stefanianna, actress best known as the original voice actress of Daphne Blake of the 1969 animated series Scooby Doo, Where Are You!, mother was Icelandic.

== See also ==
- European Americans
- Icelandic Canadians
- Hyphenated American
- Scandinavian Americans
- Iceland–United States relations
