= Lára Bjarnason =

Teacher and Icelandic emigrant to Canada (1842–1921)

Lára Bjarnason (16 May 1842 – 17 June 1921), born Lára Mikaelína Guðjohnsen in Reykjavík, Iceland, was a teacher and a leader within the Icelandic immigrant community in the Canadian province of Manitoba. She was instrumental in founding the Betel Home in Winnipeg in 1915.

Lára was the eldest child of organist Pétur Guðjónsson Guðjohnsen and his wife Guðrún Sigríður Lauritzdóttir Guðjohnsen (née Knudsen). She married Jón Bjarnason in 1870, and the couple emigrated to the United States in 1873. They moved in 1877 to the newly founded New Iceland settler reserve, where Jón Bjarnason served as minister and Lára taught Icelandic immigrant children in the community. Conditions in the settler reserve were extremely difficult, especially for families with young children, and Lára's work was unpaid. Jón and Lára left New Iceland in 1880.

The Bjarnasons returned to Manitoba four years later, when Jón accepted the position of pastor of Winnipeg's First Lutheran Church. Lára founded the Ladies' Aid of the First Lutheran Church in 1886 and took a leadership role within Winnipeg's Icelandic immigrant community. Although she was not as active in the publishing industry as her husband Jón, she also compiled two volumes of sheet music: Lauf-blöð, printed in Reykjavík in 1900, and Söngbók bandalaganna og sunnudagsskólanna, printed in 1912 in Reykjavík.

In her position as President of the Ladies' Aid, she successfully led the campaign for the opening of a seniors' home for elderly Icelandic immigrants, many of whom did not speak English. Discussion of the project began in 1901, but funding was an obstacle. In 1915, the Betel Home opened in Winnipeg at 854 William Ave. It was relocated to Gimli the following year.
