= New Iceland Heritage Museum =

Museum in Manitoba, Canada

- Location: Gimli, Manitoba
- Coordinates: 50°37′51″N 96°59′06″W
- Type: History
- Website: www.nihm.ca

The New Iceland Heritage Museum, located in Gimli, Manitoba, is a museum dedicated to preserving the history and artifacts of the large population from Iceland who migrated to the Interlake Region of Manitoba, the area known as New Iceland. The museum holds 3,500 artifacts donated by local families.

New Iceland was the area situated from Boundary Creek near Winnipeg Beach, Manitoba to Hecla Island, 36 miles along Lake Winnipeg's west shore. It was provided to the Icelanders and run as their own colony from 1875 to 1881. A regional government called the Thingrad represented the colony in all relationships with the Canadian government. They even had a provisional constitution.

The museum is located in three sites:

- Waterfront Centre has a multi-media display of the history and artifacts of the immigrants.
- Lake Winnipeg Visitors Centre has a 500-gallon aquarium with species of fish from the lake and history and artifacts of early fishing.
- Gimli Public School 1915 has an original classroom and artifacts used by the Huldufólk ('hidden folk') from Iceland.
