= Thorlakson =

Thorlakson is a surname. Thorlakson, Thorlaksson, Thorlaxson are likely the same variant. This surname is of Icelandic descent. Notable people with the surname include:

- Katie Thorlakson (born 1985), Canadian soccer player
- Paul Thorlakson (1895–1989), Canadian physician
