= Hnausa =

Community in Manitoba, Canada

Coordinates: 50°54′18″N 96°59′44″W

Hnausa is a small community located in the area known as New Iceland in Manitoba's Interlake Region. It is 6 miles, or approximately 10 kilometres, south of Riverton, and is situated on Breidavik (which means "Broad Bay" in Icelandic) on the coast of Lake Winnipeg, in the Rural Municipality of Bifrost. The settlement was founded in the area by 35 Icelandic families in 1876. Hnausa Post Office was set up in 1889 in the home of the Reverend Magnús J. Skaptason, who came from Hnausar in Iceland. Much of the population descended from these immigrants from Iceland. Its name roughly translates to "uneven ground".

Hnausa, at one time, was a prosperous community, having a school, postal office, store, sawmill, community hall, and a gas station. The community of Hnausa is now much smaller, with only has a small number of residents and the community hall remaining. Fishing and agriculture are the two main industries in the community. Many people also have summer cottages in the area. Hnausa Beach Provincial Park is just south of the community.

In 2000, Hnausa hosted the "Hnausa Homecoming", a community reunion for the current and former residents of the area. A Hnausa history book has also been published, which describes the early history of the community, as well as the numerous families that have resided in the area.
