= Rural Municipality of Gimli =

Rural municipality in Manitoba, Canada

Gimli, Manitoba
- Rural municipality
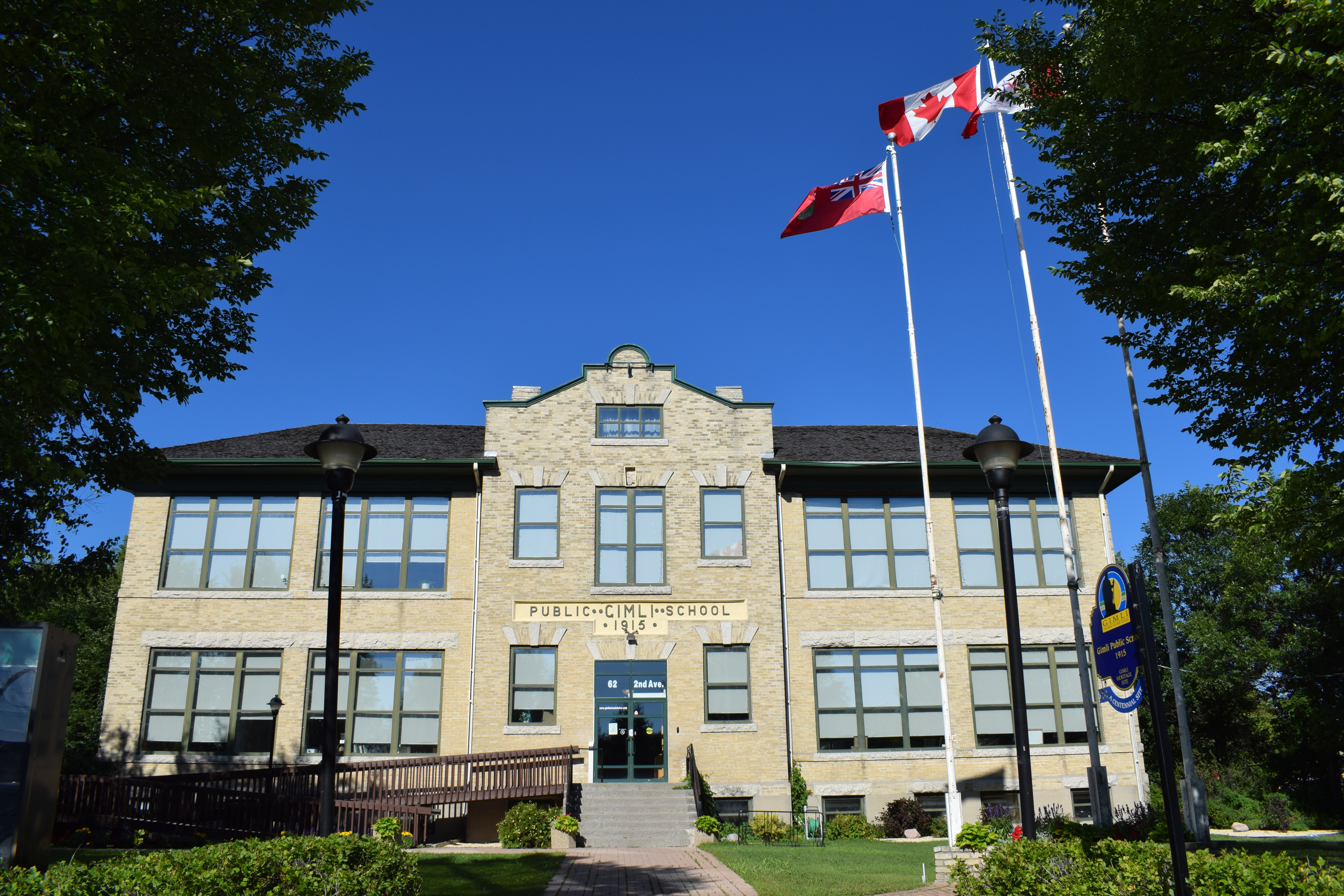
- Gimli Public School Building, constructed in 1915, and now site of the RM of Gimli's offices.

- Location of Gimli in Manitoba
- Coordinates: 50.632°N 96.989°W
- Country: Canada
- Province: Manitoba
- Region: Interlake
- Demonym: Gimlungur (singular); Gimlungar (plural)
- Founded: October 1875
- Incorporated as rural municipality: March 15, 1881
- Amalgamated with Town of Gimli: January 1, 2003

Government
  - Mayor: Kevin Chudd

Area
  - Land: 318.10 km^{2} (122.82 sq mi)
- Elevation: 222 m (728 ft)

Population (2021)
  - Total: 6,569
  - Density: 20.65/km^{2} (53.49/sq mi)
  - Urban density: 319.25/km^{2} (826.9/sq mi)
- Postal code: R0C 1B0; R0C 1B1
- Area codes: 204, 431
- Website: gimli.ca

The Rural Municipality of Gimli is a rural municipality located in the Interlake Region of south-central Manitoba, Canada, on the western shore of Lake Winnipeg. It is about 75 kilometres (47 mi) north of the provincial capital Winnipeg. The rural municipality's population in the 2016 Canadian Census was 6,181, making it the 12th largest rural municipality by population. The RM of Gimli has an area of 318.75 km^{2} (123.07 sq mi), making it the sixth smallest rural municipality by area.

The unincorporated community of Gimli and the surrounding district were once an Icelandic ethnic block settlement, and the area, known as New Iceland, is home to the largest concentration of people of Icelandic ancestry outside Iceland. It also has significant Ukrainian and German communities, at 12% and 6% respectively.

The Town of Winnipeg Beach lies adjacent to its southeast corner, on the shores of Lake Winnipeg, between it and the Rural Municipality of St. Andrews to the south.

== History ==
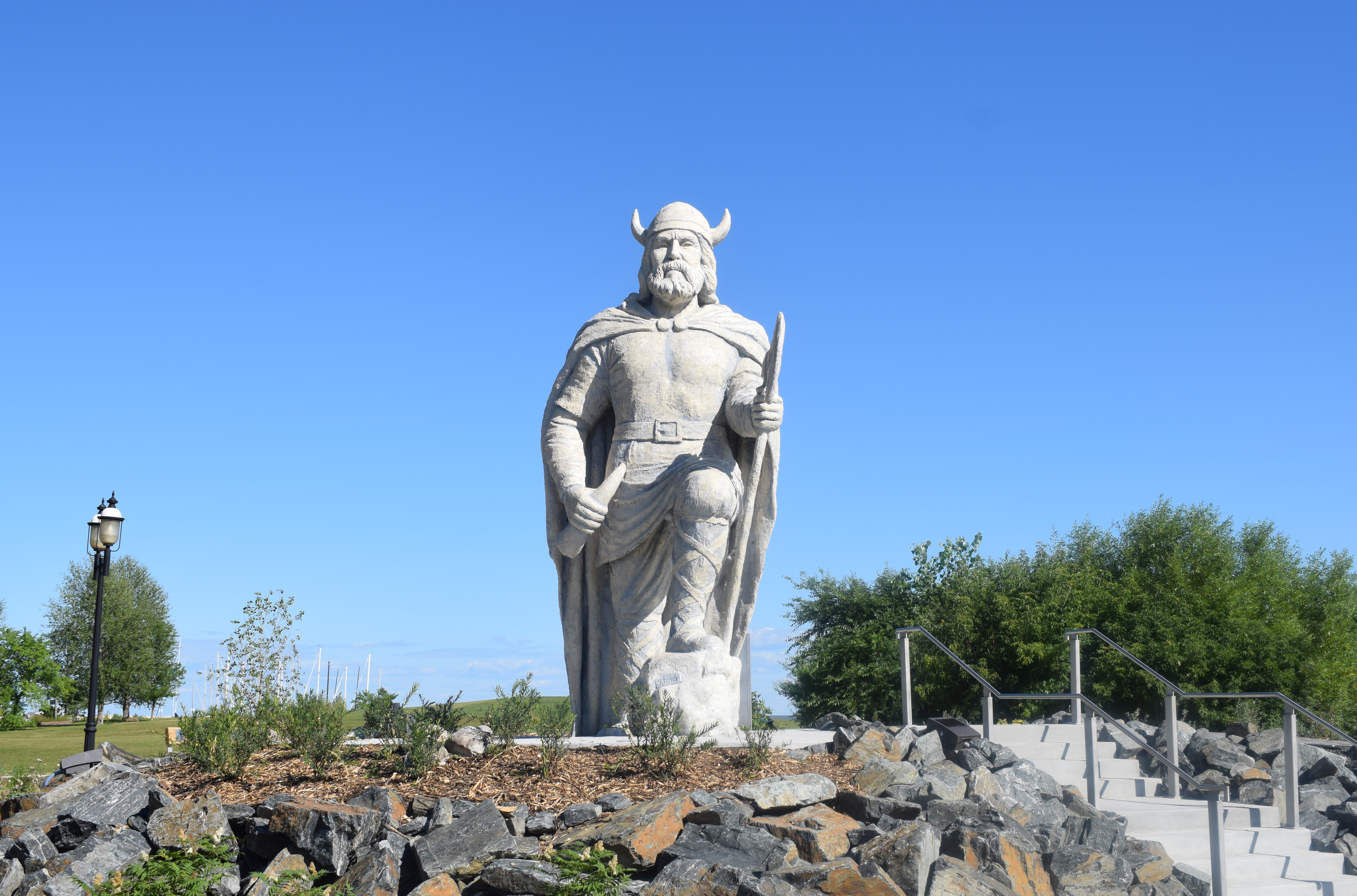
Gimli Viking statue commemorating Icelandic heritage. The statue was built in 1967 and unveiled by the President of Iceland in the same year. The statue site was then upgraded in 2017, Canada's sesquicentennial year.

The Rural Municipality of Gimli was first settled by a large group of Icelandic settlers who arrived in New Iceland on Lake Winnipeg in the 1870s. Other settlements established beyond the community of Gimli with further fisheries based settlements at Arnes, Hnausa, Beyond the borders of Manitoba as it was then, this settlement fell within the District of Keewatin, until 1881 when Manitoba was enlarged. In 1897, the Gimli area was opened up to homesteaders and saw a surge of settlers from Ukraine, Poland, Hungary and Germany. Originally organized as a self-administering "Icelandic reserve" directly responsible to Ottawa, the settlers of New Iceland developed a unique constitution of by-laws for local government which remained in effect until 1887. The initial status of New Iceland as a "reserve" remained in effect until 1899.

Fishing was always a primary source of income for those in the riding since the arrival of the original settlers of New Iceland. Some of the production of the fish occurred outside of the town of Gimli, such as the now abandoned fish processing plant in Arnes, Manitoba, that was built in 1951.

In the Gimli Glider incident on 23 July 1983, an Air Canada Boeing 767 en route from Montreal to Edmonton ran out of fuel and made an unpowered landing on a decommissioned runway (converted to a drag strip) at Gimli Industrial Park Airport, a former RCAF base near Gimli with no control tower and no fire trucks available. A reenactment of the incident aired on Discovery Channel's Mayday series and on Syfy's Urban Legends series.

The Town of Gimli amalgamated with the Rural Municipality of Gimli on January 1, 2003.

== Communities ==
- Arnes
- Camp Morton
- Gimli
- Husavik
- Miklavik
- Sandy Hook
- Siglavik
- Silver Harbour

== Demographics ==
Ethnic Origins (2016)
	Population	Percentage
English	1,685	27.9
Ukrainian	1,475	24.4
Scottish	1,460	24.2
Icelandic	1,250	20.7
Canadian	1,125	18.6
German	1,070	17.7
Irish	895	14.8
Polish	755	12.5

Historical population
Year	Pop.	±%
1981	2,237	—
1986	2,458	+9.9%
1996	3,124	+27.1%
2001	3,501	+12.1%
2006	5,797	+65.6%
2011	5,845	+0.8%
2016	6,181	+5.7%
2021	6,569	+6.3%

In the 2021 Census of Population conducted by Statistics Canada, Gimli had a population of 6,569 living in 3,141 of its 4,793 total private dwellings, a change of 6.3% from its 2016 population of 6,181. With a land area of 318.1 km^{2} (122.8 sq mi), it had a population density of 20.7/km^{2} (53.5/sq mi) in 2021.

In 2016, the average age of RM of Gimli residents was 51.4 years old, this was well over the provincial average of 39.4 The percentage of the population 65 years or older was 33.5% of the population, this was nearly double the provincial average of 15.6% of the population in the age bracket.

RM of Gimli residents claim Icelandic heritage as the fourth largest ethnic background with 20.7% of the entire rural municipality claiming some Icelandic background or 1,250 people, behind English, Scottish, and Ukrainians in the top three.

== Economy ==
Fishing has historically been the main economic driver in the Rural Municipality of Gimli. There are over 100 commercial fishers in the RM of Gimli, catching mainly pickerel in the south basin and white fish in the north basin. During the summer months, tourism is a major industry, as thousands of summer cottagers fill the Rural Municipality of Gimli, especially on weekends. Hotels, restaurants and stores cater to the summer visitors. Agriculture has also been a driver of the economy in the rural municipality.

== Arts and culture ==
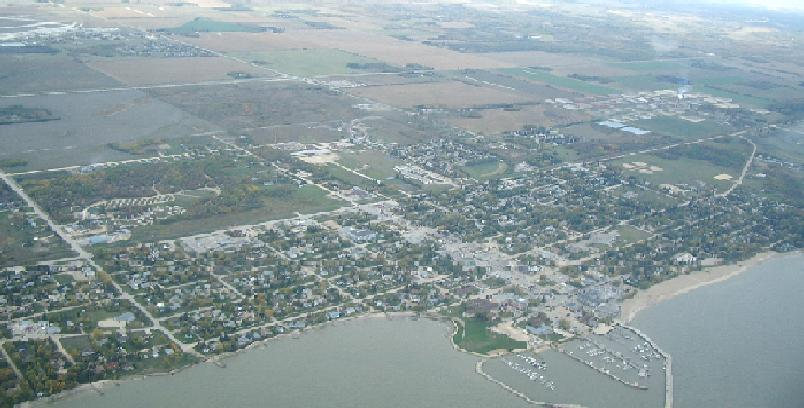
The community of Gimli in the rural municipality as seen from above.

With a large and historic Icelandic culture along the shore of Lake Winnipeg from Husavik north to Hnausa, there are many celebrations and recognition of this heritage throughout the year and the communities in the RM of Gimli. Most of these are celebrated in the town of Gimli itself, though others can be found in the other settlements throughout the RM of Gimli. Aside from the Icelandic heritage, there is also a visible Ukrainian cultural history in the rural municipality with a few churches and cemeteries across the landscape.

== Notable people ==
- Vilhjálmur Stefánsson, ethnologist and Arctic explorer born in Arnes, Manitoba.

== See also ==
- Gimli Industrial Park Airport
