= Icelandic Canadians =

Canadians with Icelandic ancestry or were born in Iceland

Íslensk-kanadískur (Icelandic) Canadiens islandais (French)
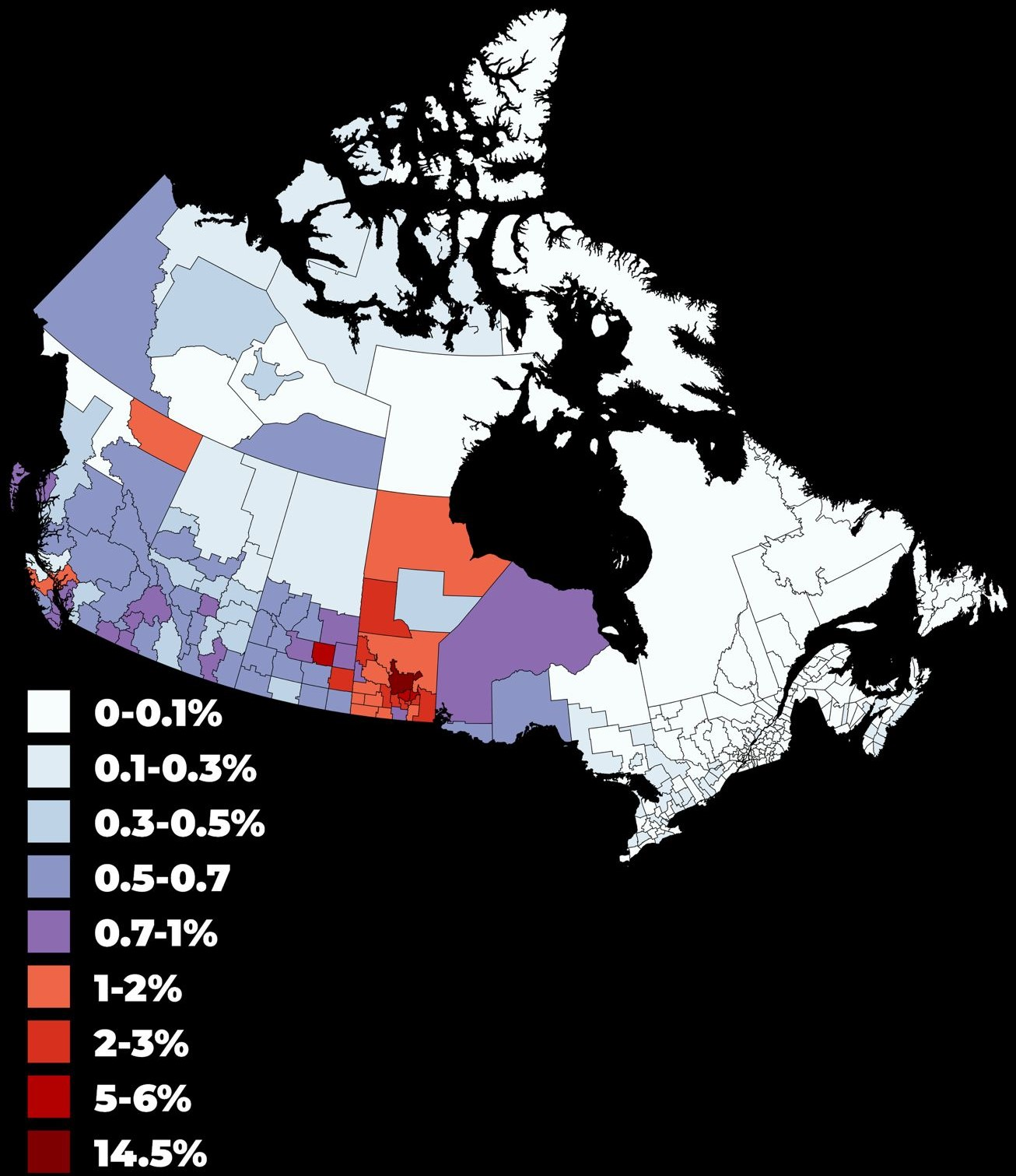
- Population distribution of Icelandic Canadians by census division, 2021 census

Total population
- 101,795 (by ancestry), 0.3% of Canada's population

Regions with significant populations
- Manitoba: 31,090
- British Columbia: 26,410
- Alberta: 20,225
- Ontario: 13,215

Languages
- Canadian English · Canadian French · Icelandic

Religion
- Christianity (Predominantly Protestant)

Related ethnic groups
- Icelandic Americans; Faroese Canadians; Norwegian Canadians; Swedish Canadians, Danish Canadians, Dutch Canadians, Flemish Canadians; See Icelanders

Icelandic Canadians (Icelandic: Íslensk-kanadískur) are Canadian citizens of Icelandic ancestry, or Iceland-born people who reside in Canada.

Canada has the largest ethnic Icelandic population outside Iceland, with about 101,795 people of full or partial Icelandic descent as of the Canada 2016 Census. Of that population in Canada, Gimli, Manitoba, is home to the largest Icelandic community outside Iceland.

Many Icelandic Canadians are descendants of people who fled an eruption of the Icelandic volcano Askja in 1875.

== History ==
Icelandic Canadian Population History
Year	Pop.	±%
1921	15,876	—
1931	19,382	+22.1%
1941	21,050	+8.6%
1951	23,307	+10.7%
1961	30,623	+31.4%
1971	27,905	−8.9%
1981	22,755	−18.5%
1986	53,755	+136.2%
1991	63,340	+17.8%
1996	70,685	+11.6%
2001	75,090	+6.2%
2006	88,875	+18.4%
2011	94,205	+6.0%
2016	101,795	+8.1%
Source: Statistics Canada Note: 1981 Canadian census did not include multiple ethnic origin responses, thus population is an undercount.

=== The Middle Ages ===
The history between Icelanders and North America dates back approximately one thousand years. The first Europeans to reach North America were Icelandic and Greenlandic Norse people whose brief presence in what is today Newfoundland (L'Anse aux Meadows) was confirmed by archaeologists in the 1960s. Two Icelandic sagas, Eiríks saga rauða and Grænlendinga saga, provide accounts of the ultimately unsuccessful attempts to create a Norse settlement in a place referred to as Vínland.

According to these same sagas, which were written several hundred years after the events they describe, the Norse settlers had significant interactions with the area's Indiegnous peoples. Just how much the Norse settlers explored further past the L'Anse aux Meadows area has been a matter of debate for the past hundred years amongst romantic and ethnic nationalists as well as historians.

=== 1870–1914 ===
The last three decades of the 19th century saw a new wave of Icelandic immigration in North America. In 1875, over 200 Icelanders immigrated to Manitoba and, with the support of the Canadian government, established the New Iceland colony along the west shore of Lake Winnipeg in Manitoba. This was the first part of a large wave of immigrants who settled on the Canadian prairies, the majority of whom came to settle in block settlements in Manitoba. By 1914, more than 14,000 Icelanders, or roughly 20% of Iceland's then-population of 75,000, resettled in North America. Evidence suggests that around 17,000 Icelanders emigrated but that roughly 2,000 returned to Iceland.

According to historian Gunnar Karlsson, "migration from Iceland is unique in that most went to Canada, whereas from most or all other European countries the majority went to the United States. This was partly due to the late beginning of emigration from Iceland after the Canadian authorities had begun to promote emigration in cooperation with the Allan Line, which already had an agent in Iceland in 1873. Contrary to most European countries, this promotion campaign was successful in Iceland, because emigration was only just about to start from there and Icelandic emigrants had no relatives in the United States to help them take the first steps".

=== 1914–present ===
The Naturalization Act of 1914 introduced more stringent requirements for naturalization in Canada. Together with the onset of the First World War, this caused a rapid decrease in the number of Icelanders settling in Canada.

The onset of the war was a key and highly contentious event for Icelandic Canadians. Many saw the war as an opportunity for Icelanders to show their commitment to their new home. Others, such as the poet Stephan G. Stephansson, were openly opposed to the war effort, especially in the wake of the 1917 Canadian federal election. In the end, 1,245 Icelanders, Icelandic Americans, and Icelandic Canadians were registered as soldiers during the War. 989 fought for Canada whereas 256 fought for the United States. 391 of the combatants were born in Iceland, the rest were of Icelandic descent. 10 women of Icelandic descent and 4 women born in Iceland served as nurses during World War I. At least 144 of the combatants died during World War I (96 in combat, 19 from wounds suffered during combat, 2 from accidents, and 27 from disease), 61 of them were born in Iceland. Ten men were taken as prisoners of war by the Germans.

During the Second World War, over 2,100 men and women of Icelandic descent served with the Canadian and American armed forces.

== Icelandic population in Canada ==
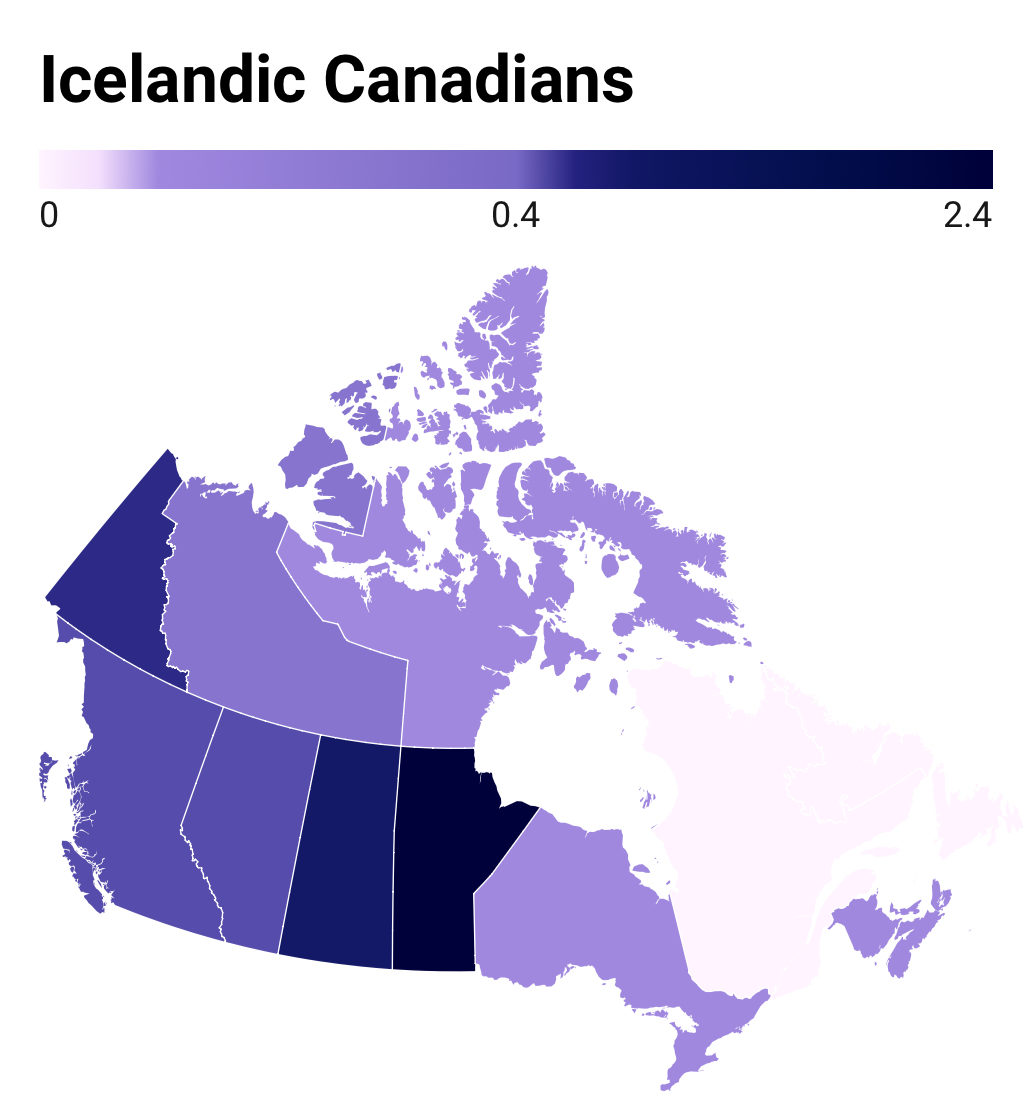
Icelandic percent in Canadian province/territory, 2021 census

The provinces with the most reported Icelandic-Canadians in 2016 are:

Province or territory	Icelandic Canadian	Percent Canadian
Canada	101,795	0.3%
Manitoba	31,090	2.4%
British Columbia	26,410	0.6%
Alberta	20,225	0.5%
Ontario	13,215	0.1%
Saskatchewan	8,255	0.8%
Quebec	955	0.01%
Nova Scotia	660	0.07%
New Brunswick	250	0.03%
Yukon	215	0.6%
Northwest Territories	200	0.5%
Newfoundland and Labrador	190	0.04%
Prince Edward Island	90	0.06%
Nunavut	30	0.08%

== Communities ==
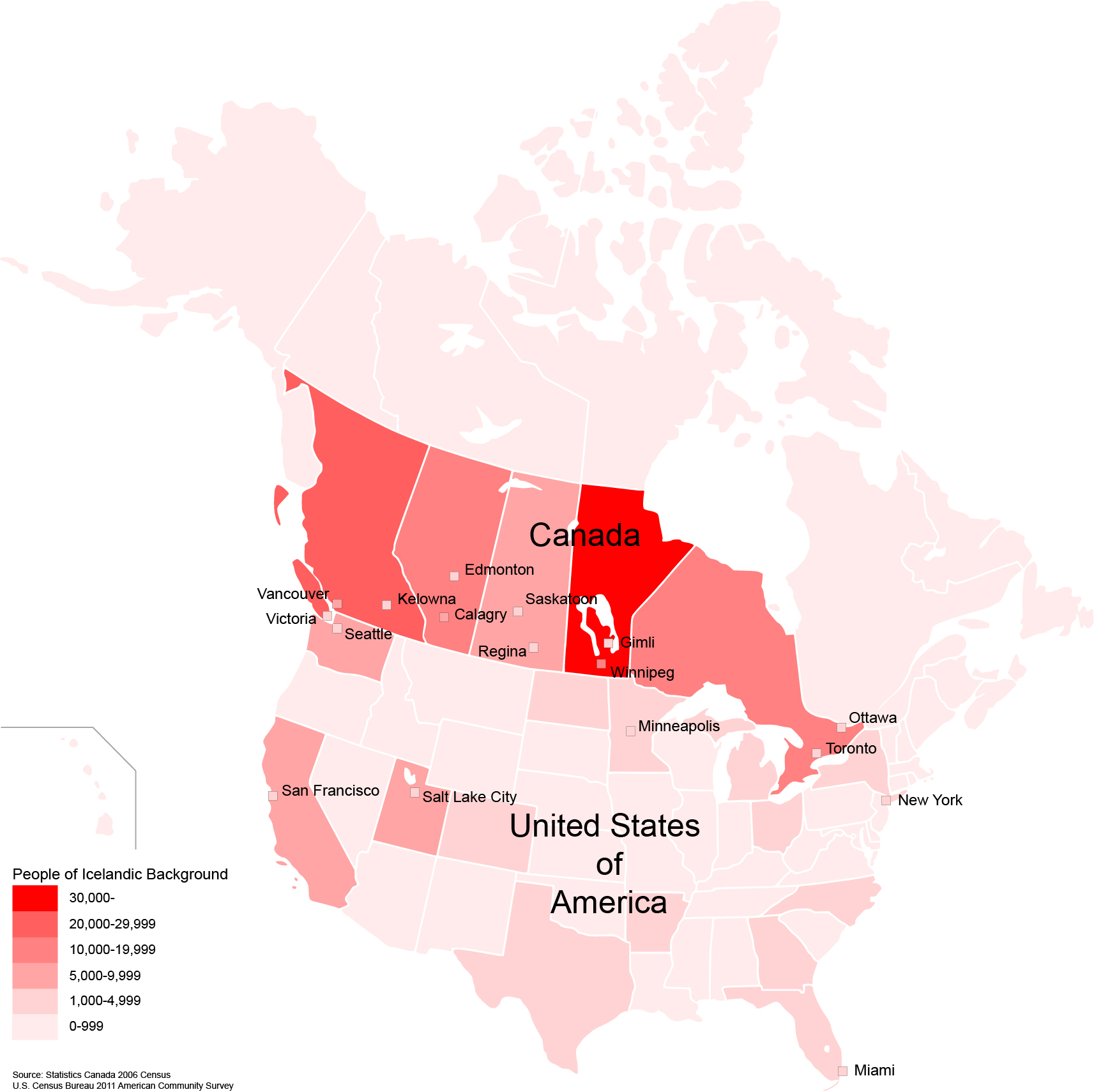
Map illustrating the distribution of people of Icelandic ethnic origin or ancestry in North America

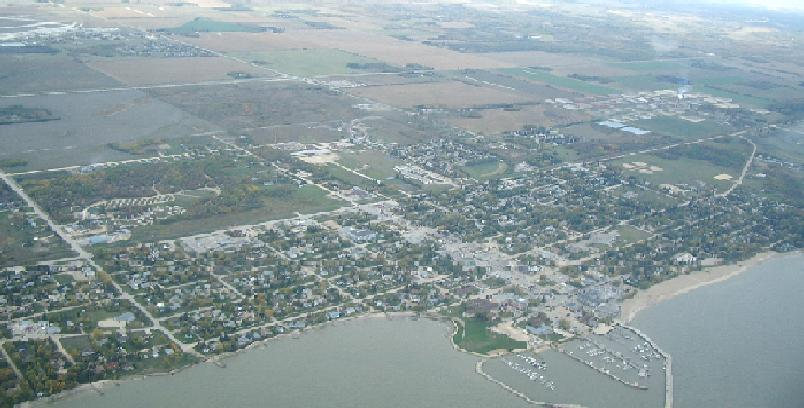
Gimli, Manitoba, is home to the largest concentration of Icelanders outside of Iceland.

Gimli, Manitoba, is home to the largest Icelandic community outside Iceland. This includes 26% of the population of Gimli proper (i.e., the unincorporated community of Gimli), and 20% of the Rural Municipality of Gimli population claiming Icelandic ancestry.

Other settlements in Canada that are notably Icelandic by foundation or ethnicity include:

- Markerville, Alberta
- Arborg, Manitoba
- Baldur, Manitoba
- Elfros, Saskatchewan
- Erickson, Manitoba
- Glenboro, Manitoba
- Lakeview, Manitoba
- Lundar, Manitoba
- Morden, Manitoba
- New Iceland (Manitoba)
- Riverton, Manitoba
- Reykjavik, Manitoba
- Wynyard, Saskatchewan
- Kinmount, Ontario

== Culture ==
=== Food ===
Icelanders brought and maintained many of their traditional culinary customs in Canada. This included savoury food traditions such as hangikjöt (smoked lamb or mutton) and harðfiskur (dried fish eaten with butter). Popular baked goods include things like kleinur (donuts), rúgbrauð (sweet rye bread), and pönnukökur (thin, crepe-like pancakes). The most powerfully symbolic food associated with the Icelandic-Canadian (and Icelandic-American) community is vínarterta (Viennese cake). No community event is complete without the presence of at least one of these striped fruit tortes accompanied by a spirited debate over the proper recipe and construction of the delicacy. While vínarterta now maintains a low profile in Iceland's culinary history, its connection to Icelandic-Canadian (and Icelandic-American) identity is inextricable.

=== Language ===
North American Icelandic evolved mainly in Icelandic settlements in Manitoba and North Dakota and is the only version of Icelandic that is not spoken in Iceland. In addition to the heavy adoption of loanwords from English, one of the characteristic features of North American Icelandic is the use of flámæli, which refers to the merger of two sets of front vowels. Although flámæli was once a part of traditional Icelandic, it was considered too confusing and was systematically eradicated from the language. But in North America, flámæli use spread unchecked. By the early 21st century, there were very few surviving speakers of North American Icelandic.

=== Publishing ===
Maintaining literacy through the production of original Icelandic language printed material was vital to the Icelandic community in Canada. The very first newspaper to be published in North America by the Icelandic immigrant population was handwritten by Jon Gudmundsson in 1876, and was called Nýi Þjóðólfur. In 1877, the first edition of a newspaper printed on a printing press, Framfari, was published out of Lundi, Manitoba between 1877 and 1880. The equally short-lived Leifur followed, published out of Winnipeg from 1883 to 1886. The end of the decade saw the creation of the larger and most-lasting of the Icelandic weekly papers, Heimskringla in 1886 and Lögberg in 1888. The two papers, both published out of Winnipeg, would continue in circulation until 1959 when they amalgamated to form Lögberg-Heimskringla, which is still in print but gradually became an English-language paper.

=== Naming customs ===
Notably, Icelandic Canadians do not typically follow traditional Icelandic naming customs, by which people do not have surnames but are instead distinguished by the use of a parent's given name as a patronymic; instead, Icelandic immigrants to Canada have largely adapted to North American customs by adopting a true surname. Icelandic surnames in Canada most commonly represent the patronymic of the person's first ancestor to settle in Canada, although they may also sometimes be chosen to represent the family's ancestral village in Iceland rather than the name of an individual ancestor.

=== The Icelandic Festival of Manitoba ===
The Icelandic Festival of Manitoba (also known as Íslendingadagurinn, Icelandic for 'Icelander's Day') is an annual festival held in Gimli, Manitoba, Canada. The first Icelandic festival in North America was held in Milwaukee in 1874. The first Icelandic festival in Manitoba was held in Winnipeg in 1890; was held there annually until 1931, and since 1932 has been held in Gimli. The festival has a tradition of selecting a woman to be the Fjallkona ('Maid of the Mountain'), wherein the Fjallkona signifies Iceland, and her children are the Icelanders. At the festival, the selected woman sits on her elevated throne, clad in a formal Icelandic costume of a white gown, green robe with ermine, golden belt, high-crowned headdress, and white veil falling over the shoulders to the waist. Two maids of honour, formerly clad in plain Icelandic costume with tasseled skullcaps, are dressed in white.

=== Museums and heritage sites ===
The New Iceland Heritage Museum, also located in Gimli, Manitoba, is a museum dedicated to preserving the history and artifacts of Icelanders who migrated to the Interlake Region of Manitoba, the area known as New Iceland. It houses permanent, temporary, and virtual exhibitions. It also hosts the digital “Book of Life” project, which is a prime resource for recording the family histories of life members of the New Icelandic Heritage Museum. Icelandic River Heritage Sites in nearby Bifrost, Manitoba is a not for profit organization, incorporate din 2007, dedicated to the restoration and enhancement of local heritage buildings and sites, historic cemeteries, and other burial sites. The group also dedicates resources to the commemoration of Icelandic Canadian people and events of historical significance.

Stephansson House Provincial Historic Site in Markerville, Alberta is significant for its association with the Icelandic-Canadian poet Stephan Gudmundsson Stephansson, known as "Poet of the Rocky Mountains," who was born in Iceland in 1853 and immigrated to North America in 1873. Stephan G.'s homesteading experience speaks to the larger history of Icelandic settlement in Alberta, Canada, and North America. The site is home to a one and one-half storey log and wood-frame cottage in a vernacular Victorian neo-Gothic style, with landscape features, located on 1.7 hectares of land. It is owned and operated as a provincial historic site by Alberta Culture and Community Spirit.

The Icelandic Emigration Center (Vesturfarasetrið) is a museum and genealogy research center occupying three buildings in the town of Hofsós, Iceland. The center provides services and houses exhibitions relating to the history of Icelandic immigration to Canada, the United States of America, and Brazil. The East Iceland Emigration Center, located in the Kaupvangur Cultural Center in Vopnafjörður, Iceland is an organization of volunteers interested in re-establishing contact with the descendants of the people who left East and Northeast Iceland (primarily Vopnafjörður, North- and South-Múlasýsla, Þistilfjörður) for North and South America in the late 19th century. Like the center in Hofsós, the center in Vopnafjörður provide genealogical services and hold exhibitions.

=== Sports ===
The Winnipeg Falcons hockey team was founded in 1911 with a roster made almost entirely of Icelandic Canadian players who had not been able to join other Winnipeg teams due to ethnic prejudice. In their first season, 1911–1912, they finished at the bottom of their league. However, the Falcons would eventually go on to win the 1920 Allan Cup. That team went on to represent Canada in the 1920 Olympic games held in Antwerp, Belgium. There the Falcons, soundly beating all their opponents, won for Canada the first Olympic gold medal in ice hockey.

== Notable Icelandic Canadians ==
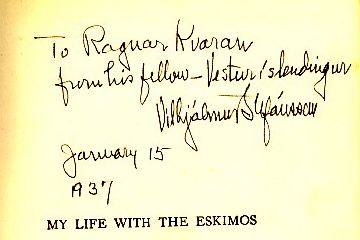
Vilhjalmur Stefansson to another Icelandic Canadian

- David Arnason, writer
- Stefan Arngrim, actor
- Carleigh Baker, writer
- Paul Bardal, politician
- Adam Beach, actor
- Robert Benson, ice hockey player
- Walter Byron, ice hockey player
- Tom Cochrane, musician
- Frank Fredrickson, ice hockey player
- Magnus Goodman, Olympic athlete
- James Gosling, computer scientist
- Kristjana Gunnars, writer
- Sturla Gunnarsson, film director
- Haldor Halderson, ice hockey player
- Christian Halldorson, politician
- Kaillie Humphries, born Kaillie Simundson, Olympic bobsleigh champion
- Konnie Johannesson, ice hockey player
- Wally Johannson, politician
- Byron Johnson, former Premier of British Columbia
- Donald K. Johnson, philanthropist
- Janis Johnson, politician
- k.d. lang, musician
- Guy Maddin, film director
- Philip Petursson, politician
- John K. Samson, musician
- Gordon Sigurjonsson, ice hockey coach
- Baldur Stefansson, agricultural scientist
- Vilhjalmur Stefansson, explorer
- Signy Stefansson Eaton, philanthropist and art collector
- Stephan G. Stephansson, poet
- Helga Stephenson, film industry executive
- William Stephenson, secret agent
- Steinn O. Thompson, politician
- Paul Thorlakson, physician
- Charles Thorson, cartoonist
- Joseph Thorarinn Thorson, politician
- Gunnar Thorvaldson, politician
- Torfhildur Þorsteinsdóttir, writer
- Bjarni Tryggvason, astronaut
- W. D. Valgardson, writer
- Caelum Vatnsdal, filmmaker and film historian
- Lindy Vopnfjörð, musician
- Cully Wilson, born Karl Erlendson, ice hockey player
- Larry Thor, radio and film actor

== See also ==
- Canada–Iceland relations
- Winnipeg Falcons
- European Canadians
- Finnish Canadians
- Norwegian Canadians
- Swedish Canadians
- Danish Canadians
- Dutch Canadians
- Flemish Canadians

== Bibliography ==
- Boultbee, Paul G., "Icelandic-Canadian bibliography", Canadian Ethnic Studies. 29(3):82-94, 1997.
