= Dóra S. Bjarnason =

Icelandic academic (1947–2020)

- Born: July 20, 1947
- Died: August 5, 2020 (aged 73)
- Occupation: Educator
- Years active: 1971–2020

Dóra Sigríður Bjarnason (20 July 1947 – 5 August 2020) was Professor Emerita in Sociology and Disability Studies/Inclusive Education in the School of Education at the University of Iceland.

== Professional career ==
Dóra completed a BA degree in sociology from the University of Manchester, MA degree from Keele University and Dr. Phil. in Disability Studies-Special Education from the University of Oslo in 2003. In the fall of 1971, she began work at the Iceland University of Education as a part-time lecturer and she was tenured in 1981. She became professor at the Iceland University of Education in 2004, which in fall of 2008 became the School of Education at the University of Iceland.

She was also a visiting professor at numerous foreign universities. She was, for example, a visiting professor at the University of Girona in Catalonia, Spain in the spring semester of 2019, visiting professor at Chapman University, California from March 15 to May 15, 2009, at Stirling University in Scotland and at the London Institute of Education (fall) 2006. In 1991, she was a guest speaker at Victoria University in New Zealand and at the University of Melbourne in Australia. Furthermore, she was a visiting professor at the Danish Pedagogical University 2000–2001, 2004 (spring), 2006 (spring) and at Syracuse University in the State of New York, USA, and the University of Oregon during 1985–1986.

== Research ==
The research of Dóra focused in particular on sociology of education, disability studies and the educational policy and practice inclusive education, history and outcomes of special education, marginalisation of people with disabilities, and the experience of three generations of disabled youngsters in school and society concurrent with changes to systemic and general support for them in their young adult years. She has also worked on a comparative study on the experience of parents of disabled children in terms of formal and informal support to families due to disability during the period 1974 to 2004 and equivalent experience of Icelandic and immigrant parents after the economic collapse 2008. She has also researched to some extent pregnancy and technology and the question: What does support for soon-to-be parents consist of if there is suspicion of “fetal damage”? Since 2000, she has placed an emphasis on discussing strategy formulation in educational affairs and marginalisation of different groups, and her writing is connected to the above-mentioned issues, as well as ideas on democracy, human rights and education.

She served on the editorial boards of a few books, the latest one being Skóli margbreytileikans. Menntun og manngildi í kjölfar Salamanca (e. The inclusive school, education and human rights after Salamance) which was published in 2016.

== Administrative activities ==
Dóra served on various committees and councils for the Iceland University of Education and later the University of Iceland and had several administrative positions abroad. She was, for example, chair of the board of the Icelandic Research Centre on School Inclusion, and in 2016, she was nominated by the Faculty Council of the Faculty of Education Studies for the Doctoral Board of the School of Education.

She served on the international jury for the UNESCO/Emir Jaber al-Ahmad al-Jaber al–Sabah Prize from 2012 to 2016.

== Recognitions ==
Dóra received various recognitions and was, for example, a Morris Ginsberg Fellow at the London School of Economics during 1977–1978.

== Books ==
- Her latest book, Brot, konur sem þorðu (Three women who dared) (2019). Reykjavík: Bókaforlagð Benedikt. The book is about three generations of very talented women (1867-2004), feminists who followed their dreams and went against the accepted roles of women in their time.
- Social policy and social capital. Parents and exceptionality 1974-2007 (2011)
- New Voices From Iceland: Disability and Young adulthood (2004)
- School inclusion in Iceland: The Cloak of Invisibility (2003)
- Dóra S. Bjarnason (1998). Leikskóli fyrir alla. Rannsókn á viðhorfum starfsfólks Dagvistar barna í Reykjavík til leikskóla fyrir alla 1986–1996. Ritröð uppeldis og menntunar. Reykjavík: Bókaforlagið Una.
- Undir huliðshjálmi. Sagan af Benedikt (1996) (Story about her son).
- Dóra S. Bjarnason (1989). Haltur ríður hrossi. Kennsluefni tengt myndböndum Fræðsluvarps um blöndun fatlaðra og ófatlaðra (1989) Reykjavík, Þroskahjálp og Öryrkjabandalag Íslands. 70s.
- Hjástundir unglinga (1971). Æskulýðsráð Reykjavíkur.

== Death ==
Dóra died on 5 August 2020.
