= Antônio da Silva Mello =

Brazilian physician and writer (1886–1973)

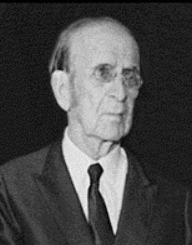
- Born: May 10, 1886; Juiz de Fora
- Died: September 19, 1973 (aged 87); Rio de Janeiro
- Occupations: Physician, writer

Antônio da Silva Mello (May 10, 1886 – September 19, 1973), best known as A. da Silva Mello was a Brazilian physician and writer.

== Biography ==
Mello was born in Juiz de Fora. He studied at the Granbery Institute and then joined the Medical School of Rio de Janeiro, where he attended until the third year, when he moved to Berlin, graduating in 1914. He specialized in clinical medicine, publishing scientific papers on the subject. He wrote on epidemiology, immunity, metabolism, nephrology, nutrition and psychology.

In 1918 he returned to Brazil, he was a professor at the Faculty of Medicine of Rio de Janeiro. He held courses for physicians and students at the Policlínica de Botafogo and Santa Casa de Misericórdia.

In 1944 he founded the Brazilian Journal of Medicine, of which he was scientific director until 1973. Mello was a member of the Academia Brasileira de Letras and the Brazilian Academy of Medicine. He identified as an agnostic.

Mello was a friend of psychiatrist Rudolf Dreikurs who was impressed by his research on mental health.

== Skepticism ==
Mello was the author of the skeptical book Mistérios e Realidades Deste e do Outro Mundo published in Brazil in 1950. It was translated into English by M. B. Fierz and published as Mysteries and Realities of This World and the Next by Weidenfeld & Nicolson in 1960. He examined case studies of faith healing, hypnosis, parapsychology and spiritualism. He discovered much credulity, deception and exaggeration. According to a review it is a "very interesting and provocative work... [Mello] disbelieves in the reality of paranormal phenomena and thinks that all can be explained in terms of the known. In his view psychical researchers are both credulous and gullible and are to be blamed for pandering to human superstition and the widespread hunger for the occult."

== Selected publications ==
- Problemas do ensino médico e de educação (1937)
- Man, His Life, His Education, His Happiness (1956)
- Mistérios e Realidades Deste e do Outro Mundo (1950) [Translated as Mysteries and Realities of This World and the Next (1960)]
- A Superioridade do Homem Tropical (1965)
