= Jón Bjarnason (minister) =

Icelandic priest (1845–1914)

Jón Bjarnason (15 November 1845 – 3 June 1914) was a Lutheran minister and a leader of the Icelandic immigrant community in Manitoba. He was born in Þvottá, Iceland, but moved to Reykjavík as a young man. He graduated from the Reykjavík seminary in 1869 and married Lára Mikaelína Guðjohnsen the following year. He emigrated with his wife to North America in 1873 and accepted an invitation to serve as the minister of the Icelandic settler reserve of New Iceland, Manitoba, in 1877.

Bjarnason was an influential figure in the Icelandic immigrant community in North America particularly in Manitoba. Although he spent only three years in New Iceland before returning to Iceland in 1880 (being replaced by Magnús J. Skaptason), he accepted an offer in 1884 to serve as the pastor of Winnipeg's First Lutheran Church and spent the remainder of his life in Manitoba, where a school (the Jón Bjarnason Academy) was named in his memory. He had a reputation as a charismatic individual who thrived on controversy. He was supported by his wife Lára, who was also his partner.
