= Iceland–United States relations =

- Iceland: United States

Diplomatic mission
- Embassy of Iceland in Washington, D.C.: U.S. Embassy in Iceland

Envoy
- Ambassador Bergdís Ellertsdóttir: Ambassador Billy Long

The United States has maintained diplomatic relations with Iceland since the mid-1800s.

== Overview ==
In 1868, the U.S. Department of State under William H. Seward authored a report that contemplated the purchase of Iceland from Denmark. The United States military, alongside the militaries of Canada and the United Kingdom established a presence in Iceland and around its waters after the Nazi occupation of Denmark (even before the U.S. entered World War II) in order to deny Nazi Germany access to its strategically important location (which would have been considered a threat to the Western Hemisphere).

The United States was the first country to recognize Icelandic independence from Denmark in June 1944, union with Denmark under a common king, and German and British occupation during World War II. Iceland is a member of the North Atlantic Treaty Organization (NATO) but has no standing military of its own. The United States and Iceland signed a bilateral defense agreement in 1951, which stipulated that the U.S. would make arrangements for Iceland's defense on behalf of NATO and provided for basing rights for U.S. forces in Iceland; the agreement remains in force, although U.S. military forces are no longer permanently stationed in Iceland.

In 2006, the U.S. announced it would continue to provide for Iceland's defense but without permanently basing forces in the country. That year, Naval Air Station Keflavik closed and the two countries signed a technical agreement on base closure issues (e.g., facilities return, environmental cleanup, residual value) and a "joint understanding" on future bilateral security cooperation (focusing on defending Iceland and the North Atlantic region against emerging threats such as terrorism and trafficking). The United States also worked with local officials to mitigate the impact of job losses at the Air Station, notably by encouraging U.S. investment in industry and tourism development in the Keflavik area. Cooperative activities in the context of the new agreements have included joint search and rescue, disaster surveillance, maritime interdiction training with U.S. Navy and U.S. Coast Guard units, and U.S. deployments to support the NATO air surveillance mission in Iceland.

The U.S.–Icelandic relationship is founded on cooperation and mutual support. The two countries share a commitment to individual freedom, human rights, and democracy. U.S. policy aims to maintain close, cooperative relations with Iceland, both as NATO allies and as states interested in the shared objectives of enhancing world peace, respect for human rights, economic development, arms control, and law enforcement cooperation, including the fight against terrorism, narcotics, and human trafficking.

== Economic relations ==
Both countries are part of the United Nations. Moreover, the United States seeks to strengthen bilateral economic and trade relations. Most of Iceland's exports go to the European Union and European Free Trade Association countries, followed by the United States and Japan. The U.S. is one of the largest foreign investors in Iceland, primarily in the aluminum sector. The United States and Iceland signed a Trade and Investment Framework Agreement in 2008.

== Iceland's membership in international organizations ==
Iceland, like the U.S., never joined the League of Nations. Iceland's ties with other Nordic states, the United States, and other NATO member states are particularly close. Iceland and the United States belong to a number of the same international organizations, including the United Nations, the Organization for Security and Co-operation in Europe, the Arctic Council, the Organisation for Economic Co-operation and Development, the International Monetary Fund, the World Bank, and the World Trade Organization.

== Diplomatic visits ==
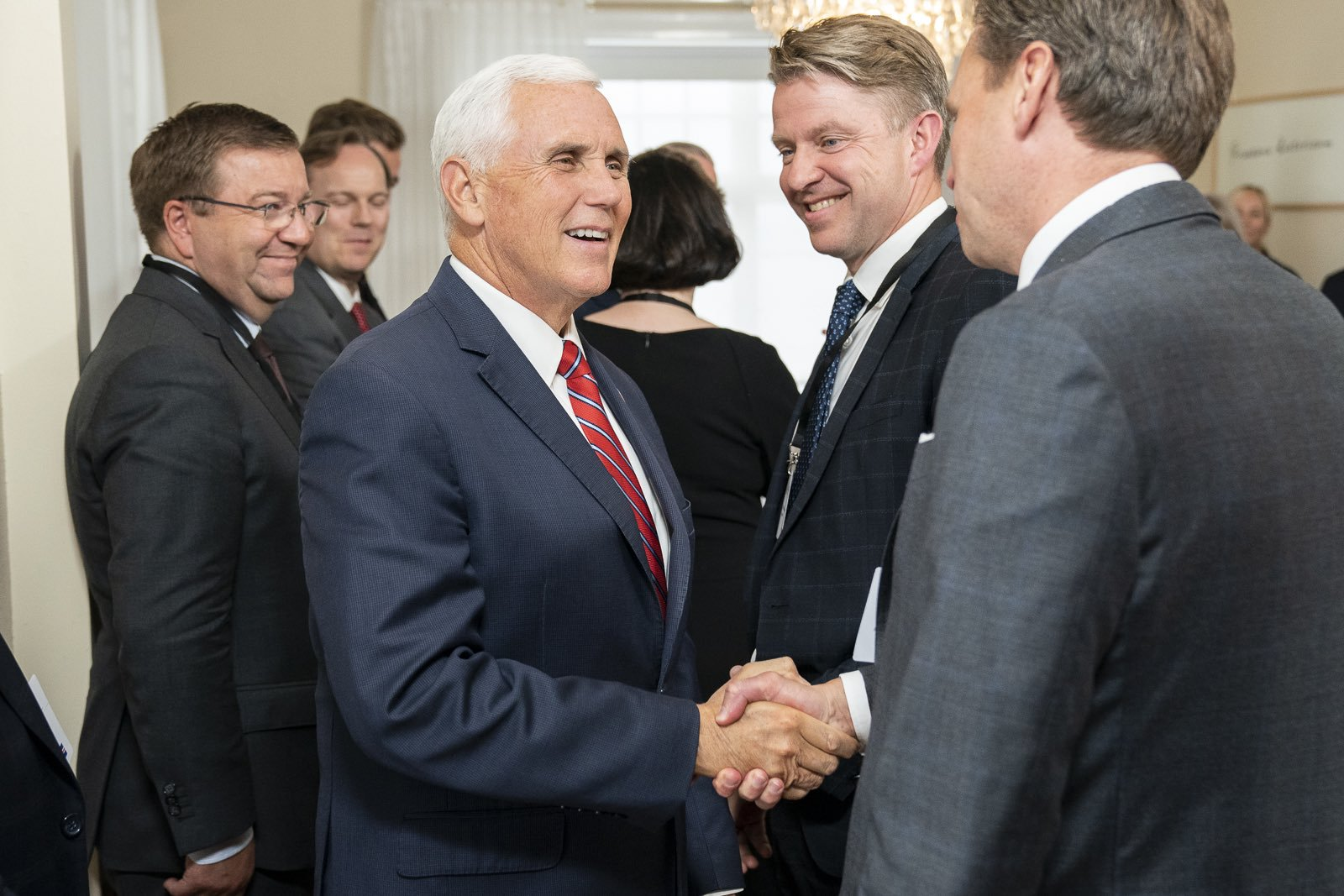
U.S. Vice President Mike Pence met with Icelandic President Guðni Thorlacius Jóhannesson, 2019

Only two U.S. presidents have visited Iceland while in office: Richard Nixon from May 31 to June 1, 1973, and Ronald Reagan from October 9 to October 12, 1986.

Reagan attended the Reykjavík Summit in 1986 with Soviet leader Mikhail Gorbachev. It was a highly dramatic moment in the Cold War, as the two leaders almost came to an agreement to abolish all nuclear weapons. They narrowly failed in this goal, but the ice was broken, and there were soon major new initiatives that led to the end of the Cold War.

Numerous other U.S. dignitaries have visited Iceland. First Lady Hillary Clinton spoke at a conference on Women and Democracy in Reykjavík in October 1999. She returned to Iceland as a U.S. senator in August 2004 on a fact-finding trip that also included her husband, former President Bill Clinton, and Senator John McCain. Secretary of State Colin Powell attended a NATO summit in Iceland in May 2002, and his successor, Condoleezza Rice, visited the country in May 2008. Secretary of State Antony Blinken visited Iceland in 2021 for the annual Arctic Council meeting, where he met with Prime Minister Katrín Jakobsdóttir and President Guðni Jóhannesson.

The U.S. maintains an embassy in Reykjavík, Iceland.

Icelandic officials have also visited the United States on several occasions. Icelandic President Ólafur Ragnar Grímsson attended a technology summit hosted by Alaska Governor Sarah Palin in October 2007. He also met with Maine Governor Paul LePage at an international trade summit in Portland, Maine in May 2013.

On May 13, 2016, President Barack Obama hosted a summit and state dinner for Nordic leaders from Iceland, Norway, Sweden, Denmark, and Finland. Among the attendees from the Icelandic delegation were Prime Minister Sigurður Ingi Jóhannsson and the Icelandic Ambassador to the U.S., former Prime Minister Geir Haarde.

== Resident diplomatic missions ==
- Iceland has an embassy in Washington, D.C., and a consulate-general in New York City.
- United States has an embassy in Reykjavík.
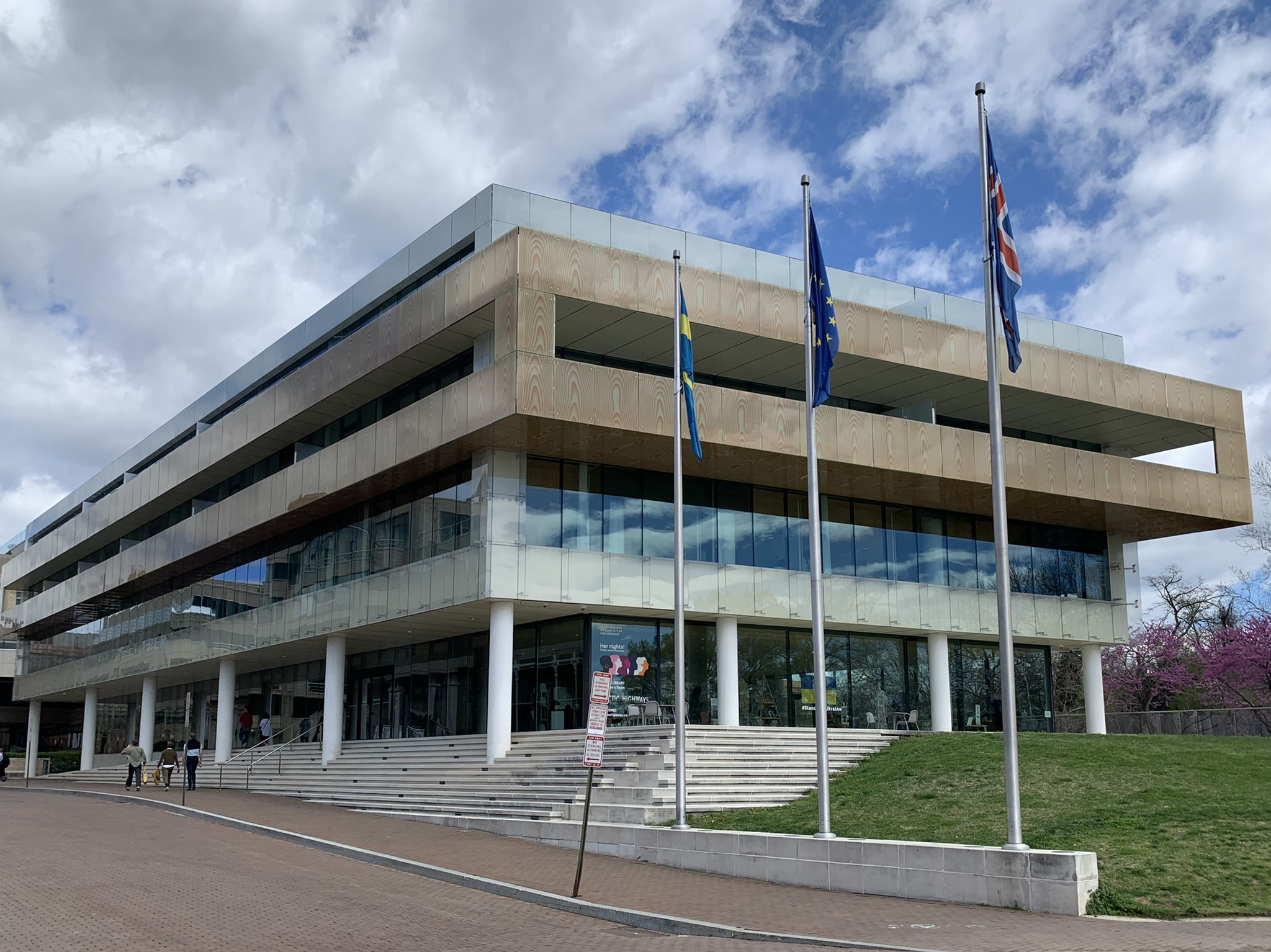
Embassy of Iceland in Washington, D.C.

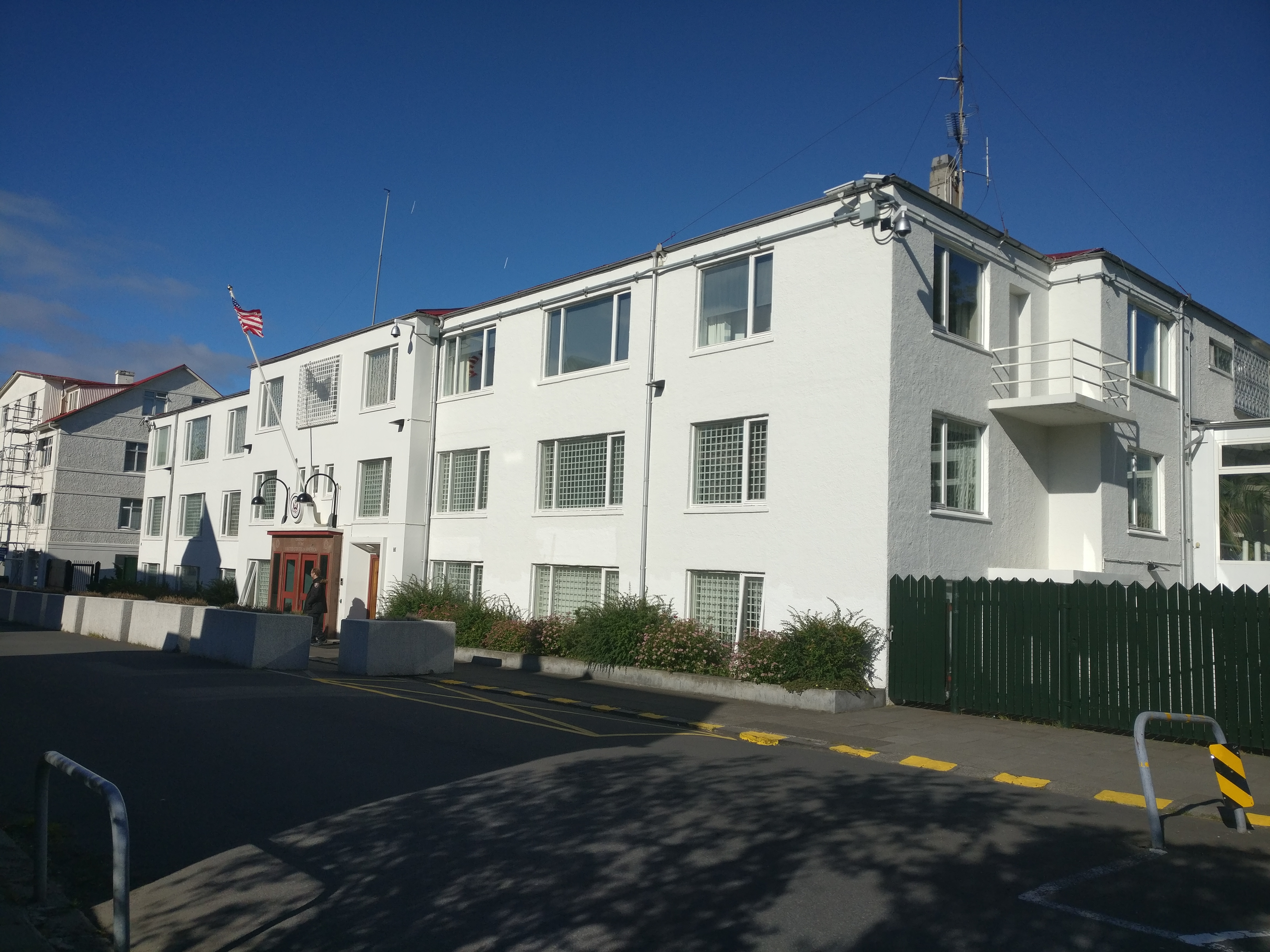
Former building of the Embassy of the United States in Reykjavík

== See also ==
- Icelandic Americans
- Foreign relations of the United States
- Foreign relations of Iceland
