= Íeda Herman =

Icelandic author and adventurer (1925–2019)

Íeda Jónasdóttir Herman
- Born: Ída Jónasdóttir; May 21, 1925; Reykjavík, Iceland
- Died: October 9, 2019 (aged 94); Burlington, Iowa
- Occupations: writer, interior designer
- Spouse: Delbert Jury Herman (1945-2015)
- Children: 10
- Writing career
- Language: English, Icelandic
- Years active: 2014-2019
- Genres: memoir, fiction, cooking
- Subjects: Icelandic culture and cuisine
- Website: vikingamma.com

Íeda Jónasdóttir Herman (May 21, 1925, in Reykjavík, Iceland – October 9, 2019, in Burlington, Iowa) was an Icelandic author and adventurer.

== Life ==
Herman was born to Jonas Bjornsson and Dagbjort Oktavia Bjarnadottir in Iceland in 1925. She grew up in the 1930s, and was raised hearing stories of Vikings and the Huldufólk or "Hidden People" of Iceland. During World War II, she met Rev. Delbert J Herman, an American serviceman who was stationed in Reykjavík. They were married on March 25, 1945. She was the first Icelandic woman to marry an American soldier. They then moved to Illinois together. When she became a US citizen in 1956, she lost her Icelandic citizenship.

Herman graduated with a degree in interior design in Chicago, and opened her own design shop. She retired in 2009 and earned a degree from the Institute of Children's Literature. In 2015, her husband of 70 years died.

At 88 years old, Herman went paragliding for the first time in Utah. She loved it so much, she repeated the experience two years later in her homeland of Iceland. She also explored the cave that inspired Jules Verne's Journey to the Center of the Earth.

Despite suffering from a stroke in 2016, she remained very active physically, staying fit and traveling. At the age of 91, she co-authored a cookbook of Icelandic cuisine with her daughter. Along with her daughter, she conducted presentations on Icelandic culture and cooking. She also led adult education seminars, and has written articles for magazines and newspapers. She was the subject of the 2019 RÚV documentary Aldrei of Seint (Never Too Late).

Herman died on October 9, 2019, in Burlington, Iowa. Her Icelandic citizenship had been restored by Alþingi earlier that year. At the time of her death, Herman had 24 great-grandchildren and eight great-great-grandchildren, and had been returning to Iceland annually to share her story and knowledge of Icelandic history.

== Works ==
- Íeda Jónasdóttir Herman (August 24, 2017). Happiness in Living Color. Heidi Herman (Compiler). Hekla Publishing. p. 56. ISBN 978-1947233959.
- Herman, Heidi; Herman, Íeda Jónasdóttir (July 19, 2017). Homestyle Icelandic Cooking for American Kitchens. Hekla Publishing. p. 82. ASIN B074412T18.
- Íeda Jónasdóttir Herman (April 3, 2017). Viking Kids Don't Cry. Hekla Publishing. p. 152. ISBN 9780998281681.
- Íeda Jónasdóttir Herman (July 17, 2016). The Silver Arrow. CreateSpace Independent Publishing Platform. p. 118. ISBN 9781535203623.
- Íeda Jónasdóttir Herman (2014). Trolls - Monster Worm - Hidden People: Fond Memories of Iceland. Outskirts Press. p. 249. ISBN 978-1-4787-0008-1.
