= Einar Hjörleifsson Kvaran =

Icelandic editor, novelist, poet, playwright and prominent spiritualist

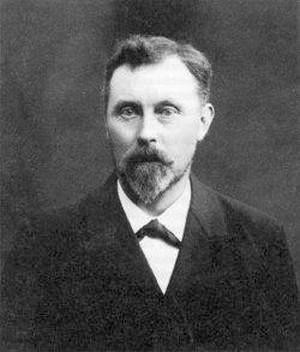
Einar Hjörleifsson Kvaran

Einar Gísli Hjörleifsson Kvaran (6 December 1859 in Vallanes, Iceland as Einar Hjörleifsson – 21 May 1938 in Reykjavík) was an Icelandic editor, novelist, poet, playwright and prominent spiritualist.

== Life ==
Einar Kvaran was the son of Rev. Hjörleifur Einarsson and Guðlaug Eyjólfsdóttir. His name was originally Einar Hjorleifsson but he adopted the family name Kvaran in 1916 along with his brothers Sigurdur and Trygvi and the sons of his deceased brother Joseph. (The name is taken from Laxdæla saga. In 1913, the Althing passed a law, since rescinded, which permitted Icelanders to adopt family names. Einar Hjörleifsson was on a committee that proposed to allow certain categories of names, including those with ancient origins.)

Einar graduated in 1881 from the College of Iceland, known as the Latin School. As a student in economics at the University of Copenhagen in 1882, he was one of four students to publish the single issue of the literary periodical Verðandi, which introduced to Iceland the Modern Breakthrough expounded by Georg Brandes. Einar was one of the pioneers of realism in Icelandic writing; his stories and novels represent a break with past admiration of the sagas: they are written in educated contemporary language and deal with ordinary people and problems.

From 1885 to 1895 Einar emigrated to Icelandic Canada, where he lived in Winnipeg and helped found two Icelandic-language weekly publications, Heimskringla ("Globe") and Lögberg ("Tribune"). On his return to Iceland he was a journalist and editor in both Reykjavík and Akureyri; he participated in the struggle for independence and also wrote about education, temperance and theatre. He was co-editor of Ísafold, then Iceland's leading newspaper, and editor of Fjallkonan. He edited Skírnir, the journal of the Icelandic Literary Society, from 1892 to 1895 and from 1908 to 1909.

Einar wrote numerous short stories, novels, plays, and a volume of early poems. His breakthrough work was the story "Vonir" ("Hopes"), which he wrote in 1890 while in Canada and which deals with the emigrant experience. In 1906 the Government of Iceland granted him a stipend to enable him to devote himself entirely to writing.

Einar was also a prominent Spiritualist, author of the first positive assessment of spiritualism in Icelandic and co-founder and President of the Experimental Society which gave rise to the Icelandic Society for Psychical Research (Sálarrannsóknarfélag Íslands), of which he was the first president. He played a major part in the investigation and publicising of many Icelandic mediums, notably Indriði Indriðason and Hafstein Björnsson. His later writings were dominated by spiritualism, particularly the novel Sögur Rannveigar ("Rannveig's Tales", parts I and II 1919 and 1922), but also by Christian humanism. He influenced Icelanders to be less rigidly orthodox and to be less harsh in rearing their children.

In the 1920s, there was a rumour that Einar was considered for the Nobel Prize in Literature, but in response Sigurður Nordal disparaged him as overly focused on forgiveness and thus tolerant of things that should rather be opposed; in the spirit of Icelandic nationalism and contemporary interpretations of Nietzsche, he considered the blood feud a better ethical model. In the 1930s Halldór Laxness criticised him more sharply yet for his spiritualism.

== Personal life ==
Einar was married twice. His first wife, Mathilde Petersen, was Danish; she died in Canada, and their two children both died in infancy. In 1888 he married Gíslína Gísladóttir. They had five children; the eldest, Sigurður, died of tuberculosis when he was 15.

== Sources ==
- Richard Beck. Einar H. Kvaran, an Icelandic Novelist and Dramatist. OCLC 83281608
- Gils Guðmundsson. Í Nærveru Sálar: Einar Hjörleifsson Kvaran, Maðurinn og Skáldið. Reykjavík : Setberg, 1997. ISBN 997952202X
