= Icelandic diaspora =

Community of Icelandic emigrants

Map of the Icelandic diaspora in the world (includes people with Icelandic ancestry or citizenship). Iceland + 100,000 + 10,000 + 1,000 + 100

The Icelandic diaspora refers to both historical and present emigration from Iceland. The countries with the largest number of people of Icelandic descent are Canada, the United States, and Norway.

== Famous people of Icelandic descent ==
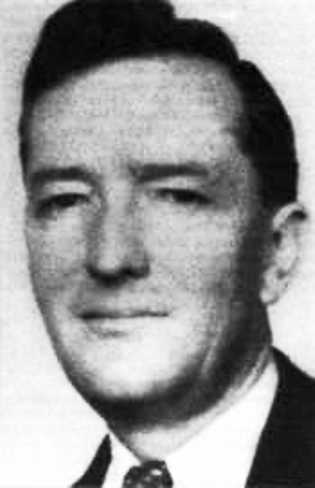
William Stephenson, a Canadian soldier, airman, businessman, inventor, spymaster, and the senior representative of British intelligence for the entire western hemisphere during World War II.

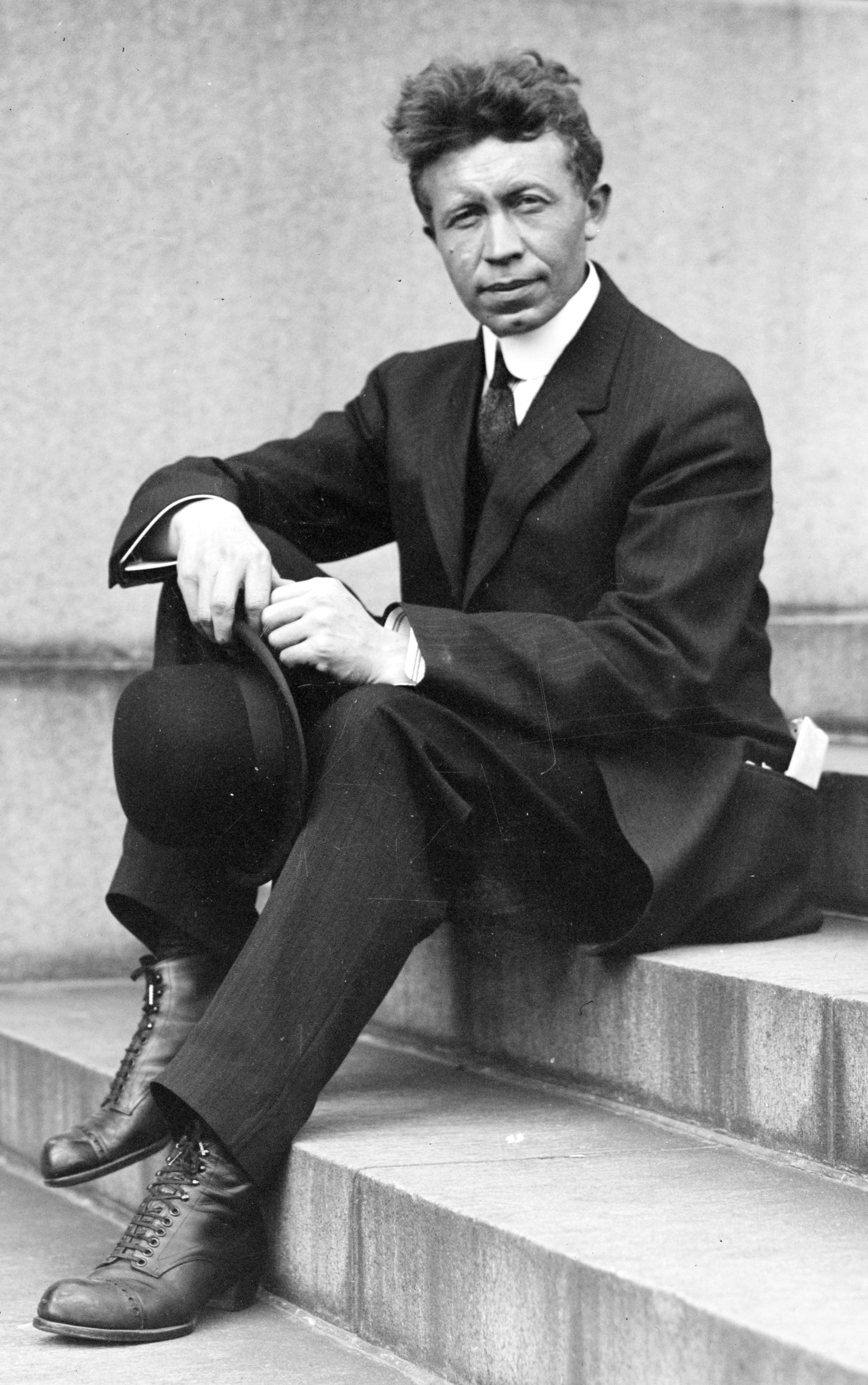
Vilhjalmur Stefansson, a Canadian Arctic explorer and ethnologist.

- David Arnason, a Canadian author and poet.
- Linda Bennett, an English-Icelandic clothing designer and entrepreneur.
- Björk, an Icelandic singer, living in the United States
- Helgi Daníelsson, a football player from Iceland, who currently plays for Swedish club AIK.
- Henry Einarson, a politician in Manitoba, Canada.
- Magnus Eliason, a founding member of the Co-Operative Commonwealth Federation.
- Frank Fredrickson, a Canadian ice hockey centre.
- Sturla Gunnarsson, a Canadian film director.
- Hafliði Hallgrímsson, an Icelandic composer, currently living in Edinburgh.
- Gunnar Hansen, an Icelandic-born actor and author best known for playing Leatherface in The Texas Chain Saw Massacre (1974).
- Hera Hjartardóttir, a singer-songwriter from Iceland who now lives in Christchurch, New Zealand.
- Bill Holm, was an American poet, essayist, memoirist, and musician.
- Jón Sveinbjørn Jónsson, a Norwegian poet, children's writer and translator, born in Iceland.
- k.d. lang, a Canadian pop and country singer-songwriter and occasional actress.
- Laufey, an Icelandic-Chinese singer-songwriter and multi-instrumentalist currently living in Los Angeles.
- Guy Maddin, a Canadian screenwriter, director, cinematographer and film editor of both features and short films.
- Magnus Magnusson, a television presenter, journalist, translator and writer.
- Jón Ólafsson, was an Icelandic editor, journalist, and poet.
- Peter Phelps, an Australian actor, singer and writer.
- John K. Samson, a singer-songwriter and the frontman of the Canadian folk punk band The Weakerthans.
- Peter Steele, was the lead singer, bassist, and composer for the gothic metal band Type O Negative.
- Vilhjalmur Stefansson, a Canadian Arctic explorer and ethnologist.
- Stephan G. Stephansson, was a Western Icelander, poet, and farmer.
- William Stephenson, a Canadian soldier, airman, businessman, inventor and spymaster.
- Chester Thordarson, was an Icelandic-American inventor who eventually held nearly a hundred patents.
- Emilíana Torrini, an Icelandic-born singer currently living in London.
- Bjarni Tryggvason, an Icelandic-born Canadian engineer and a former NRC/CSA astronaut.

== Destinations ==
=== Europe ===
- Scandinavian migration to Britain
- Icelanders in Sweden

=== North America ===
- Icelandic Americans
- Icelandic Canadians

=== Oceania ===
- Icelandic Australians
- Nordic New Zealanders

== See also ==
- History of Iceland
- List of Icelanders
- Category:People of Icelandic descent
