= Paul Thorlakson =

Canadian physician (1895–1989)

Paul Henrik Thorbjorn Thorlakson
- Born: October 5, 1895; Park River, North Dakota, United States
- Died: October 19, 1989 (aged 94); Winnipeg, Manitoba, Canada
- Occupation: Medical Doctor
- Known for: Chancellor of the University of Winnipeg
- Awards: Order of Canada; Order of the Falcon

Paul Henrik Thorbjorn Thorlakson, CC (October 5, 1895 – October 19, 1989) was a Canadian physician and Chancellor of the University of Winnipeg.

Paul Thorlaksonwas born in Park River, North Dakota and grew up in Selkirk, Manitoba. He was the third child of the Reverend Neils Steingrimur Thorlákson (1857-1943), who was an immigrant from Iceland and Erika Christopha Rynning (1860-1947), who was born in Norway. He father was a minister in the Lutheran Church who served the congregations in Minnesota, North Dakota, and Manitoba.

During World War I he was a medical sergeant. After the war he received his medical degree from the University of Manitoba in 1919. He subsequently undertook his post-graduate studies in surgery in London, England. He co-founded the Maclean-Thorlakson clinic, renamed the Winnipeg Clinic in 1938, one of the earliest multi-speciality private group practice clinics in Canada. He was surgeon-in-chief at the Winnipeg General Hospital and professor of surgery at the University of Manitoba. In 1969 he was elected Chancellor of the University of Winnipeg. Dr. Thorlakson served three terms as chancellor of the University of Winnipeg. He also became a governor of the American College of Surgeons. In 1974, he was the official representative of the Government of Canada to the celebrations marking the 1100th anniversary of the settlement of Iceland.

== Honours ==
- In 1939 he was named Knight of the Order of the Falcon and was promoted to Commander in 1951.
- He received honorary doctorates from the University of Manitoba (1952), University of Iceland (1961), Brandon University (1970), and University of Winnipeg (1979).
- In 1970 he was made a Companion of the Order of Canada.
