= New Iceland =

Region on Lake Winnipeg in Manitoba, Canada

New Iceland Nýja Ísland
- Settlement
- Interactive map of New Iceland
- Country: Canada
- Province: Manitoba
- Region: Interlake

New Iceland (Icelandic: Nýja Ísland) is the name of a region on Lake Winnipeg in Manitoba founded by Icelandic settlers in 1875.

The community of Gimli, which is home to the largest concentration of Icelanders outside of Iceland, is seen as the core of New Iceland. Other rural areas of Manitoba settled by Icelanders include Lundar (on Lake Manitoba); Hecla-Grindstone Provincial Park (on Lake Winnipeg); Glenboro, in the southwestern region of the province; Selkirk, north of Winnipeg; and Morden to the south.

== History ==
=== Background ===
Between 1870 and 1915, some 20,000 Icelanders left their homeland—roughly a quarter of the population of Iceland—due to harsh environmental and economic conditions in the country, including the eruption of Mount Askja.

From 1863 to 1873, a small but growing emigration movement developed. Initially, Brazil was favoured as a likely destination, with over 40 Icelanders emigrating to that country, and many more prepared to go before transportation difficulties blocked the movement. Attention then turned to North America.

In May 1870, four young Icelanders moved to Milwaukee, Wisconsin, inspired by enthusiastic letters from a Danish store clerk. Letters home from the four men encouraged many others to go the same way and try life in the New World. Soon, six people followed to North America in 1871 and twenty-two in 1872. Among them was Sigtryggur Jonasson, a young government official who became the first Icelander to arrive in Canada.

Around this time, in the 1870s, the federal Government of Canada began a series of reserve schemes to establish populations of European ethnic minorities—Mennonites, Doukhobors, and Icelanders—both in Manitoba and what was then the North-West Territories.

A group of 115 Icelandic settlers joined Jonasson in Canada the following year, taking up land in the Rosseau district of Ontario. In 1874 a second and larger group of 365 Icelanders arrived to homestead in Kinmount, Ontario. Suitable land for a large Icelandic colony in Ontario's Free Grant area was limited, and in the spring of 1875, the newcomers' search for a colony site resumed. Many of the Kinmount group were attracted to Nova Scotia, while those who remained were persuaded by a Scottish missionary, John Taylor, to seek land in Manitoba or the North West Territories.

Three emissaries, Taylor, Sigtryggur Jonasson, and Einar Jonasson, were elected to search for the new colony site in the west. The delegation was joined by several Icelandic settlers from Wisconsin and arrived at the frontier town of Winnipeg, Manitoba, on 20 July 1875. The young province had suffered a grasshopper plague that summer, but the Icelandic delegation was impressed with land they inspected immediately north of Manitoba's boundaries.

=== Founding New Iceland ===
On 25 September 1875, over 200 Icelandic immigrants migrated from Kinmount, Ontario, to Winnipeg, Manitoba, from where they then travelled north by flatboat on the Red River to the west shore of Lake Winnipeg. Here, they had been promised an Icelandic reserve in the District of Keewatin, in what was then an unorganized part of the Northwest Territories. (The migrants' original destination was the White Mud River; however, bad weather made it impossible to go all the way, so they chose a town in the bay north of Willow Point: Gimli.)

This reserve, established by an order-in-council through the Dominion Lands Act, and included Big Island (now Hecla Island), became New Iceland. The land comprised an 18-kilometre (11 mi) wide tract running along the shores of Lake Winnipeg for about 68 km (42 mi), and was chosen for its relative fertility and proximity to the proposed route of the Canadian Pacific Railway.

This would make the first part of a large wave of immigrants who settled in the Canadian Prairies. These Icelandic settlers, known in their native language as Vestur-Íslendingar ('Icelanders in the West'; initially many Icelanders did not see emigration as a change of country, and there was some discussion of moving the entire population), called their settlement "New Iceland".

=== Early history ===
Between 1875 and 1887, New Iceland was completely independent, without any interventions from the Canadian government. In this time, the settlers created their own laws, maintained their own schools, and generally managed their own affairs.

This new settlement still took some adapting to, however. The new immigrants' first attempts at fishing on Lake Winnipeg were not successful, as the Icelanders were accustomed to fishing at sea and set their nets too close to the shore. The winter of 1875–1876 was also one of the coldest on record in Manitoba, and the settlers' clothes—including the leather shoes from Ontario—were not suitable for the rigorous weather." People began to get sick of scurvy and other diseases, and approximately 35 lost their lives the first winter in New Iceland.

After a few years of failed fishing, homesteading, and politicking, public opinion began to turn against the Icelandic transplants. In an 1877 piece, a writer for the Manitoba Free Press described New Iceland’s population as an "effete and unprogressive race, who were not equal to the struggle of life on this continent and must inevitable [sic] succumb to the fate of the ‘least fit’."

The more general migration followed an offer from Lord Dufferin of land in Manitoba to establish what amounted to a "free state".

In 1876, 1200 others joined the first group. Fifty immigrants had remained in Winnipeg the first year, and 200 the second, creating the basis for the first permanent urban Icelandic settlement in Canada.

More people came from Iceland and the colony grew, with Icelandic settlements being formed in Alberta and the Dakotas. Immigrants learned to handle the ax, how to prepare the soil, fish through ice, and hunt game, as well as how to drain the land, grow crops, and build better houses.

Between 1877 and 1880, first Icelandic newspaper in North America, called Framfari ('The Progress'), was published in New Iceland.

A series of natural disasters, including floods and a smallpox epidemic 1876-77, decimated the population, until a general exodus in 1878 to Winnipeg and North Dakota began. By 1881, the population of the New Iceland area had declined to about 250.

Also in 1881, the provincial boundaries of Manitoba were extended north, and New Iceland officially became a part of the Province of Manitoba.

Until 1897, only Icelanders were allowed to settle in New Iceland and Icelandic was spoken. The colony changed when it became a part of Canada, whereafter English grew in frequency and the children received better educations.

== Demographics and culture ==
According to Statistics Canada, Manitoba is home to the largest Icelandic population outside of Iceland. There are about 26,000 people with Icelandic ancestry living in Manitoba, making up about 2 per cent of the total population of the province. About 35 per cent of the Icelandic Canadian population lives in Manitoba.

Currently many ethnic festivals related to New Iceland, such as Íslendingadagurinn, are held in these areas, and also the weekly newspaper Lögberg-Heimskringla is printed in Winnipeg.

Gimli, Manitoba, was within the "Icelandic Reserve" granted to Icelandic settlers by the Government of Canada in 1875. New Iceland was never a "republic", though the settlers did organize their own local government, which until December 1881 was outside the boundaries of Manitoba. The reserve, at that time within the District of Keewatin, Northwest Territory, was always under Canadian jurisdiction, and the Icelanders were keenly aware of their new loyalties and obligations as Canadians and British subjects—as evidenced during speeches made at Gimli during the visit of Lord Dufferin, Governor General of Canada, in 1877.

== See also ==
- Council of Keewatin
- Demographics of Manitoba
- David Arnason
- Einar Hjörleifsson Kvaran
- Jón Bjarnason (minister)
- Sigtryggur Jonasson
- Leif Erikson
- Lake Manitoba
- Fraserwood
- Interlake
- Rural Municipality of Gimli

== Bibliography ==
- Angrímsson, Guðjón. 1997. Nýja Ísland: Saga of the journey to New Iceland. ISBN 978-0-88801-255-5.
- Arnason, David. 1994. The new Icelanders: A North American community. ISBN 0-88801-186-5.
- Olafson-Jenkyns, Kristin. 2001. The Culinary Saga of New Iceland: Recipes from the Shores of Lake Winnipeg. ISBN 0968911900.
