= Manitoba Highway 9 =

Provincial road in Manitoba, Canada

Provincial Trunk Highway 9
- Main St; Gimli Rd; McPhillips Rd; 7th Ave
- PTH 9 highlighted in red

Route information
- Maintained by Manitoba Infrastructure
- Length: 84 km (52 mi)
- Existed: 1928–present

Major junctions
- South end: Route 52 in Winnipeg
- PTH 101 near Winnipeg; PTH 27 at St. Andrews; PTH 44 at Lockport; PTH 67 at Lower Fort Garry; PTH 4 / PTH 9A in Selkirk
- North end: PR 222 / PR 231 in Gimli

Location
- Country: Canada
- Province: Manitoba
- Rural municipalities: Gimli; St. Andrews; West St. Paul
- Major cities: Selkirk; Winnipeg
- Towns: Winnipeg Beach

Highway system
- Provincial highways in Manitoba; Winnipeg City Routes
← PTH 8	→ PTH 9A

Provincial Trunk Highway 9 (PTH 9) is a provincial primary highway located in the Canadian province of Manitoba. It runs from Winnipeg (where it meets with Route 52) north to Gimli.

The highway is known as Main Street between Winnipeg and Selkirk, as this is the name of the road within both of those cities. The bypass around Selkirk is known as the "Selkirk By-Pass". The road that runs through Selkirk is known as PTH 9A (Main Street also continues as PTH 9A, and then as PR 320 until PTH 4, where it becomes Breezy Point Road).

== Route description ==
PTH 9 begins in the Rural Municipality of West St. Paul at the Winnipeg city limits, with the road continuing southwest into the city as Winnipeg Route 52 (Route 52 / Main Street). It heads northeast as a 4-lane divided highway for 1 kilometre (0.62 mi) to have a cloverleaf interchange with PTH 101 (North Perimeter Highway) before becoming undivided (still a 4-lane) and winding its way along the banks of the Red River, passing by several subdivisions before crossing into the Rural Municipality of St. Andrews. It is heavily developed along the entire Main Street section, functioning as a suburban arterial road with many residences and businesses.

PTH 9 temporarily widens to a divided highway in Parkdale at around an intersection with PTH 27 (Parkdale Road, leads to St. Andrews Airport) and PR 238 (River Road, follows along the western banks of the river and provides access to River Road Provincial Park), before passing through the hamlets of Lees Crossing, St. Andrews (where it has an intersection with PR 410 (St. Andrews Road)), and bypassing Lockport 1 kilometre (0.62 mi) to the west at an intersection with PTH 44. The highway becomes divided again as it travels through Little Britain, where it passes by Lower Fort Garry and has a junction with PTH 67, and Old England, where it splits off on a 2-lane bypass around the southern and western sides of the city of Selkirk, having intersections with PR 230 and PTH 4, with the old route through the city known as PTH 9A (which Main Street continues to follow). At this point, the character along Highway 9 changes from suburban to rural.

PTH 9 heads northwest as a 2-lane to travel through Clandeboye, where it curves due northward, crosses Wavey Creek, and begins paralleling PTH 8 (which only lies 5 kilometres (3.1 mi) to the west). The highway travels through Petersfield, where it crosses Netley Creek, and Netley, where it has an intersection with PTH 17, before the begins following the southwestern coastline of Lake Winnipeg. It passes through the beach communities of Chalet Beach, Sans Souci, Matlock (where it has an intersection with PR 232, a loop road off PTH 9 that directly follows the shoreline), and Dunnottar (where it has an intersection with PR 225).

PTH 9 now travels directly through the centre of downtown Winnipeg Beach, reuniting with PR 232 not too far from Winnipeg Beach Provincial Park, and having an intersection with PR 229. The highway enters the New Iceland region as it crosses into the Rural Municipality of Gimli, winding its way up the lake's shoreline as it travels through Sandy Hook, where it has an intersection with PR 519, and Husavik before entering the town of Gimli. It passes through several neighbourhoods and grazes the western tip of downtown, which follows Centre Street, before PTH 9 comes to and end at an intersection between PR 231 and PR 222, with the road continuing north as PR 222 while PR 231 (N Fifth Avenue) connects it to PTH 8.

== History ==
Originally, PTH 9 followed what is now Routes 42 (then known as Route 40) and 57 through Winnipeg. Outside the Perimeter, the route followed Provincial Road 204 to Lockport, where it joined its present alignment.

Today's PTH 9 between Winnipeg and Lockport was previously part of PTH 1 prior to 1958, and part of PTH 4 between 1958 and 1968. The Selkirk By-Pass between PR 230 and PTH 9A was not signed. In 1968, PTH 9 was moved to its present alignment.

At Gimli, the roadway continues northerly as Provincial Road 222.

== Major intersections ==
Division	Location	km	mi	Destinations	Notes
City of Winnipeg		0.0	0.0	Main Street (Route 52 south) – Downtown Winnipeg	Winnipeg city limits; PTH 9 southern terminus; continues as Route 52
West St. Paul		1.1	0.68	Perimeter Highway (PTH 101)	interchange
West St. Paul	Middlechurch	2.1	1.3	To PR 220 east / Grassmere Road	
St. Andrews		9.6	6.0	PTH 27 west (Parkdale Road) / PR 238 east (River Road) – St. Andrews Airport, River Road Provincial Park	
St. Andrews		14.3	8.9	PR 410 (St. Andrews Road)	
St. Andrews	Lockport	17.3	10.7	PTH 44 east – Beausejour	
St. Andrews	Lower Fort Garry	20.4	12.7	PTH 67 west (Fort Garry Road) – Stonewall	
St. Andrews		21.8	13.5	PTH 9A north (Main Street) – Selkirk	PTH 9 branches west; north end of Main Street designation
St. Andrews		23.1	14.4	PR 230 south (McPhillips Road)	PTH 9 turns north
City of Selkirk		28.2	17.5	Manitoba Avenue	
City of Selkirk		29.3	18.2	PTH 9A south (Easton Drive) – Selkirk PTH 4 east to PTH 59	PTH 9 branches northwest
St. Andrews		55.9	34.7	PTH 17 west – Teulon, Fisher Branch	
St. Andrews		60.8	37.8	PR 232 north (Matlock Road) – Dunnottar	
St. Andrews		62.5	38.8	PR 225 (Whytewold Road) – Dunnottar	
Town of Winnipeg Beach		68.6	42.6	PR 232 south (Churchill Road) / Ash Avenue – Ponemah	
Town of Winnipeg Beach		69.0	42.9	PR 229 west (Komarno Road) / Park Avenue	
Gimli	Sandy Hook	72.5	45.0	PR 519 west (1st Avenue)	
Gimli	Gimli	84.3	52.4	PR 231 west – Fraserwood PR 222 north – Hnausa	PTH 9 northern terminus; through traffic follows PR 222 north; PR 231 west connects to PTH 8
1.000 mi = 1.609 km; 1.000 km = 0.621 mi: Route transition

== Related routes ==
=== Provincial Trunk Highway 9A ===
Provincial Trunk Highway 9A
- Location: Selkirk
- Length: 7.4 km (4.6 mi)
- Existed: 1960–present

Provincial Trunk Highway 9A (PTH 9A) is a 7.4-kilometre-long (4.6 mi) alternate route of PTH 9, running the heart of downtown Selkirk.

=== Provincial Road 232 ===
Provincial Road 232
- Matlock Road, Gimli Road, Churchill Road
- Location: Dunnottar - Winnipeg Beach
- Length: 9.9 km (6.2 mi)
- Existed: 1966–present

Provincial Road 232 (PR 232) is a 9.9-kilometre-long (6.2 mi) north-south loop off of PTH 9 running along the coastline of southern Lake Winnipeg, linking the village of Dunnottar and the town of Winnipeg Beach.

PR 232 begins in the Rural Municipality of St. Andrews at a junction with PTH 9 several kilometres north of Petersfield, heading east for a couple of kilometres as Matlock Road to enter the Matlock neighbourhood of the village of Dunnottar. Almost immediately, PR 232 makes a sharp turn to the north along Gimli Road and begins paralleling a railroad and the Lake Winnipeg coastline as it travels into the Whytewold neighbourhood, making a sharp right at an intersection with PR 225 (Whytewold Road). The highway crosses over Tugela Creek and passes through a switchback at an intersection with Ponemah Road to enter the Ponemah neighbourhood. It now leaves Dunnottar and travels through a rural section of the Rural Municipality of St. Andrews for a couple of kilometres before entering the town of Winnipeg Beach as Churchill Road and having an intersection with Robinson Avenue, which provides access to downtown, the boardwalk, and Winnipeg Beach Provincial Park. After passing through a residential area, PR 232 comes to an end at another junction with PTH 9. The entire length of PR 232 is a paved two-lane highway.

Division	Location	km	mi	Destinations	Notes
St. Andrews		0.0	0.0	PTH 9 – Selkirk, Winnipeg Beach	Southern terminus; road continues west as Matlock Road
Village of Dunnottar		3.0	1.9	PR 225 west (Whytewold Road)	Eastern terminus of PR 225
St. Andrews	No major junctions				
Town of Winnipeg Beach		9.0	5.6	Robinson Avenue – Winnipeg Beach Provincial Park, Downtown, Boardwalk	
Town of Winnipeg Beach		9.9	6.2	PTH 9 – Selkirk, Gimli	Northern terminus; road continues as Ash Avenue
1.000 mi = 1.609 km; 1.000 km = 0.621 mi
