= Manitoba Provincial Road 224 =

Provincial road in Manitoba, Canada

Provincial Road 224
- PTH 26 highlighted in red

Route information
- Maintained by Department of Infrastructure
- Length: 44.6 km (27.7 mi)
- Existed: 1966–present

Major junctions
- South end: PTH 17 / PR 325 near Hodgson
- PR 412 in Dallas/Red Rose
- North end: Fisher Bay

Location
- Country: Canada
- Province: Manitoba

Highway system
- Provincial highways in Manitoba; Winnipeg City Routes
← PR 222	→ PR 225

Provincial Road 224 (PR 224) is a 44.6-kilometre-long (27.7 mi) paved north–south highway in the Interlake Region of Manitoba, Canada. Traversing the right bank of the Fisher River for nearly its entire length, it provides road access to the community of Fisher Bay, as well as the First Nations of Peguis and Fisher River.

Near its northern end, PR 224 does pass through a short section of Fisher Bay Provincial Park.

== Route description ==
PR 224 begins roughly 2 kilometres (1.2 mi) east of the town of Hodgson along the northern border of the Rural Municipality of Fisher, at an intersection with PR 325, which also serves as the northern terminus of PTH 17. The highway immediately enters the Peguis First Nation as it winds it way through residential areas while following along the banks of Bottle Creek for the next few kilometres. Passing by where Bottle Creek joins the Fisher River, PR 224 begins following the river as it travels through the business district/settlement of Peguis. The road passes some more residential areas before leaving the First Nation and curving eastward to travel through wooded areas for a few kilometres. It now passes through the community of Dallas/Red Rose, where it meets the southern end of PR 412 (Jackhead Road), which provides access to the Kinonjeoshtegon First Nation as well as the Provincial Parks of Lake St. Andrew and Lake St. George, before entering the Fisher River Cree Nation. PR 224 crosses a bridge over the Fisher River to pass through the main settlement of Fisher River, including its business and residential districts. The highway leaves the First Nation and turns northward away from the river to travel through a short section of Fisher Bay Provincial Park before entering the community of Fisher Bay and coming to an end at a T-intersection with a residential street along the coastline of Lake Winnipeg's bay of the same name. The entire length of Provincial Road 224 is a paved two-lane highway.

== Major intersections ==
Division	Location	km	mi	Destinations	Notes
Fisher		0.0	0.0	PTH 17 south / PR 325 – Riverton, Hodgson	Southern terminus of PR 224; northern terminus of PTH 17
No. 19	Dallas/Red Rose	26.3	16.3	PR 412 north (Jackhead Road) – Jackhead	Southern terminus of PR 412
Fisher River Cree Nation	Fisher River	32.8	20.4	Crossing of the Fisher River	
No. 19	Fisher Bay	44.6	27.7	Jackhead Road	Northern terminus
1.000 mi = 1.609 km; 1.000 km = 0.621 mi
