= Manitoba Provincial Road 229 =

Highway in Manitoba, Canada

Provincial Road 229
- PR 229 highlighted in red

Route information
- Maintained by Department of Infrastructure
- Length: 81.3 km (50.5 mi)
- Existed: 1966–present

Major junctions
- West end: PTH 6 in Clarkleigh
- PTH 17 / PR 416 in Inwood; PTH 7 near Komarno; PTH 8 near Winnipeg Beach
- East end: PTH 9 in Winnipeg Beach

Location
- Country: Canada
- Province: Manitoba
- Rural municipalities: Coldwell, St. Laurent, Armstrong, Rockwood, Gimli, St. Andrews
- Towns: Winnipeg Beach

Highway system
- Provincial highways in Manitoba; Winnipeg City Routes
← PR 227	→ PR 230

Provincial Road 229 (PR 229) is an 81.3-kilometre-long (50.5 mi) east–west highway in the Interlake Region of Manitoba, connecting the communities of Lundar and Oak Point with Inwood, Komarno, and Winnipeg Beach. It also provides road access to Lake Manitoba, Lake Winnipeg, and the Shoal Lakes.

== Route description ==
PR 229 begins in the Rural Municipality of Coldwell at an intersection with PTH 6 (Northern Woods and Water Route) in the tiny community of Clarkleigh, roughly halfway between Lundar and Oak Point, as well as only 7 kilometres (4.3 mi) from the eastern coastline of Lake Manitoba. It heads east as a gravel road through rural countryside for several before winding its way southeast, temporarily entering the Rural Municipality of St. Laurent to cross over North Shoal Lake along a causeway before entering the Rural Municipality of Armstrong.

The highway joins PTH 17 in a concurrency, now becoming paved as the two head south to enter Inwood, making a sharp turn to the east at a junction with PR 416 to head straight through the centre of town. Leaving Inwood, PR 229 separates just 5 kilometres (3.1 mi) north of Norris Lake Provincial Park and heads due east for several kilometres along the boundary between the Rural Municipality of Armstrong and the Rural Municipality of Rockwood to travel through Komarno and have a junction with PTH 7. Now following the Rural Municipality of Gimli / Rural Municipality of St. Andrews boundary, PR 229 has an intersection with PTH 8 (Veterans Memorial Highway) before entering the town limits of Winnipeg Beach, where it comes to an end at an intersection with PTH 9 (Gimli Road) in a neighbourhood on the northern end of town, just blocks from Winnipeg Beach Provincial Park and the western shores of Lake Winnipeg. The entire length of PR 229 is a two-lane highway.

== Major intersections ==
Division	Location	km	mi	Destinations	Notes
Coldwell	Clarkleigh	0.0	0.0	PTH 6 (NWWR) – Winnipeg, Ashern	Western terminus; western end of unpaved section
Coldwell–St. Laurent boundary		22.9	14.2	Ideal Road to PR 518 – Woodlands	
St. Laurent		26.5– 30.4	16.5– 18.9	Gravel Causeway across North Shoal Lake	
Armstrong		40.3	25.0	PTH 17 north – Narcisse	Western end of PTH 17 concurrency; eastern end of unpaved section
Armstrong	Inwood	43.6	27.1	PR 416 south	Northern terminus of PR 416
Armstrong		45.4	28.2	PTH 17 south – Teulon	Eastern end of PTH 17 concurrency
Armstrong–Rockwood boundary		63.3	39.3	PTH 7 – Arborg, Teulon	
Gimli–St. Andrews boundary		78.0	48.5	PTH 8 (Veterans Memorial Highway) – Gimli, Winnipeg	
Town of Winnipeg Beach		81.3	50.5	PTH 9 (Gimli Road) – Sandy Hook, Winnipeg Beach	Eastern terminus; road continues as Park Avenue towards Boundary Creek Marina and Winnipeg Beach Provincial Park
1.000 mi = 1.609 km; 1.000 km = 0.621 mi: Concurrency terminus
