= Manitoba Highway 27 =

Provincial highway in Manitoba

Provincial Trunk Highway 27
- Parkdale Road
- PTH 27 highlighted in red

Route information
- Maintained by Department of Infrastructure
- Length: 2.8 km (1.7 mi)
- Existed: 1968–present

Major junctions
- West end: PTH 8 in Parkdale
- East end: PTH 9 / PR 238 near Parkdale

Location
- Country: Canada
- Province: Manitoba
- Rural municipalities: St. Andrews

Highway system
- Provincial highways in Manitoba; Winnipeg City Routes
← PTH 26	→ PTH 30

Provincial Trunk Highway 27 (PTH 27, locally known as Parkdale Road) is a very short provincial highway in the Canadian province of Manitoba. It runs from PTH 8 (McPhillips Rd.) to PTH 9 (Main St.).

Along with PTH 49 and 57, PTH 27 one of the shortest provincial trunk highways within Manitoba. Unlike the other two highways, which are short connector spurs to the same numbered highways in Saskatchewan, PTH 27 serves as a connector between two major highways within the Winnipeg metropolitan area.

The highway is used as a connector to PTH 8 and the St. Andrews Airport from the minor communities along Main St.

The speed limit is 80 km/h (50 mph).

== Route description ==
PTH 27 begins in Parkdale at a junction with PTH 8 (McPhillips Street), with the road continuing as Apache Trail. The highway heads due southeast, passing by several businesses and few homes to have an intersection with Aviation Boulevard, which provides access to St. Andrews Airport. It leaves Parkdale and travels through rural farmland, crossing a railroad track and entering a neighbourhood, where PTH 27 comes to an end at an intersection with PTH 9 (Main Street). The road continues northeast as PR 238 (River Road).

The entire length of Manitoba Highway 27 is a paved two-lane highway, lying entirely in the Rural Municipality of St. Andrews.

== History ==
The current PTH 27 has been in existence since 1968. The highway was originally numbered as PTH 8A when it first opened in 1964.

Prior to this, Highway 27, while still a short trunk highway, was located in the southwestern part of the province. It was an unpaved highway which provided access to Rapid City between PTH 10 at Tremaine (this section was known as Highway 26 prior to 1938) and PTH 16 (then known as Highway 4) at Basswood. The highway followed what is now PTH 24 and PR 270. The original length of Highway 27 was 29 km (18 mi).

Highway 27 was shortened to 22 kilometres (14 mi) in 1956 when the section between Tremaine and Rapid City was renumbered to its current PTH 24 designation. The original Highway 27 was decommissioned in its entirety in 1965 and redesignated as PR 270 when the Manitoba Government implemented its secondary road system the following year.

== Major intersections ==
Division	Location	km	mi	Destinations	Notes
St. Andrews	Parkdale	0.0	0.0	PTH 8 (McPhillips Street) – Winnipeg, Gimli	Western terminus
St. Andrews	Parkdale	0.9	0.56	Aviation Boulevard – St. Andrews Airport	
St. Andrews		2.8	1.7	PTH 9 (Main Street) – Selkirk, Winnipeg; PR 238 north (River Road) – Lockport, River Road Provincial Park	Eastern terminus; southern terminus of PR 238
1.000 mi = 1.609 km; 1.000 km = 0.621 mi
