= Manitoba Provincial Road 225 =

Provincial road in Manitoba, Canada

Provincial Road 225
- Whytewold Road
- PTH 26 highlighted in red

Route information
- Maintained by Department of Infrastructure
- Length: 6.2 km (3.9 mi)
- Existed: 1966–present

Major junctions
- West end: PTH 8 at Melnice
- PTH 9 near Dunnottar
- East end: PR 232 in Dunnottar

Location
- Country: Canada
- Province: Manitoba
- Rural municipalities: St. Andrews
- Villages: Dunnottar

Highway system
- Provincial highways in Manitoba; Winnipeg City Routes
← PR 224	→ PR 227

Provincial Road 225 (PR 225), also known as Whytewold Road, is a short, 6.2-kilometre (3.9 mi) east–west provincial road located in the Interlake Region of Manitoba, Canada. The route connects the village of Dunnottar with major highways including Provincial Trunk Highway 8 (PTH 8) and Provincial Trunk Highway 9 (PTH 9), providing access to nearby urban centres such as Selkirk and Winnipeg.

== Route description ==
PR 225 begins in the Rural Municipality of St. Andrews at a junction with Provincial Trunk Highway 8 (PTH 8) (Veterans Memorial Highway) in the locality of Melnice, adjacent to St. Williams Cemetery. From there, it proceeds due east through rural farmland and open countryside for several kilometres. The road intersects with PTH 9 before entering a residential area.

Continuing east, PR 225 passes into the village of Dunnottar, where it travels through additional residential neighbourhoods. The route terminates at an intersection with PR 232 (Gimli Road) in the Whytewold neighbourhood, near a railway crossing and approximately 0.4 km (0.25 mi) from the western shore of Lake Winnipeg.

The entire length of PR 225 is a paved, two-lane roadway.

== Major intersections ==
Division	Location	km	mi	Destinations	Notes
St. Andrews	Melnice	0.0	0.0	PTH 8 (Veterans Memorial Highway) – Winnipeg, Gimli	Western terminus
St. Andrews		4.9	3.0	PTH 9 – Selkirk, Gimli	
Village of Dunnottar		6.2	3.9	PR 232 (Gimli Road) – Whytewold, Matlock	Eastern terminus
1.000 mi = 1.609 km; 1.000 km = 0.621 mi
