= Manitoba Provincial Road 412 =

Provincial road in Manitoba, Canada

Provincial Road 412
- Jackhead Road
- PR 412 highlighted in red

Route information
- Maintained by Department of Infrastructure
- Length: 63 km (39 mi)
- Existed: 2019–present

Major junctions
- South end: PR 224 in Dallas/Red Rose
- North end: Jackhead

Location
- Country: Canada
- Province: Manitoba

Highway system
- Provincial highways in Manitoba; Winnipeg City Routes
← PR 411	→ PR 415

Provincial Road 412 (PR 412), also known as Jackhead Road, is a 63-kilometre-long (39 mi) north-south all-weather road in Manitoba connecting PR 224 with Kinonjeoshtegon First Nation's Jackhead community, passing by Lake St. Andrew and Lake St. George Provincial Parks along the way.

== Route description ==
PR 412 begins at a junction with PR 224 in the farmland of the Dallas/Red Rose community. It immediately crosses a bridge over the Fisher River and winds its way northward through woodlands for the next several kilometres. The highway passes by the Provincial Parks of Lake St. Andrew and Lake St. George, as well as the two lakes of the same name, before winding it past several smaller lakes for several more kilometres, where an access road forks off towards Jackhead Harbour. PR 412 now enters the Kinonjeoshtegon First Nation reserve of Jackhead 43, also known as the community Jackhead, which it travels through for a few kilometres before coming to a dead end along the western coastline of Lake Winnipeg.

The entire length of PR 412 is an unpaved, two-lane, gravel road.

== History ==
Provincial Road 412
- Location: St. Francois Xavier - Warren
- Existed: 1966–1992

Prior to the 1992 Great Decommissioning, PR 412 previously existed along an 18.6-kilometre-long (11.6 mi) gravel route in the Rural Municipalities of St. Francois Xavier, Rosser, and Woodlands. It ran along what is now known as Meadows Road and Road 6 West, from PTH 26 near the community of St. Francois Xavier, to PR 227 near the town of Warren, intersecting PR 221 and passing through Meadows in between.

== Major intersections ==
Division	Location	km	mi	Destinations	Notes
No. 19	Dallas/Red Rose	0.0	0.0	PR 224 – Hodgson, Fisher River	Southern terminus
No. 19	Dallas/Red Rose	0.05	0.031	Crossing of the Fisher River	
No. 19	Lake St. George Provincial Park	37.1	23.1	Lake St. George Provincial Park	Access road into park
No. 19	Lake St. Andrew Provincial Park	38.1	23.7	Lake St. Andrew Provincial Park	Access road into park
No. 19		56.4	35.0	Jackhead Harbour Access Road - Jackhead Harbour	
Kinonjeoshtegon First Nation	Jackhead	63	39	Dead end at Lake Winnipeg	Northern terminus
1.000 mi = 1.609 km; 1.000 km = 0.621 mi
