= Manitoba Provincial Road 238 =

Provincial road in Manitoba, Canada

Provincial Road 238
- River Road
- PR 238 highlighted in red

Route information
- Maintained by Manitoba Infrastructure
- Length: 10.1 km (6.3 mi)
- Existed: 1966–present
- Known for: River Road Provincial Park

Major junctions
- North end: PTH 44 at Lockport
- South end: PTH 9 / PTH 27 near Parkdale

Location
- Country: Canada
- Province: Manitoba
- Rural municipalities: St. Andrews

Highway system
- Provincial highways in Manitoba; Winnipeg City Routes
← PR 237	→ PR 239

Provincial Road 238 (PR 238), also known as River Road, is a provincial road in the Winnipeg Metropolitan Region of Manitoba, in the Rural Municipality of St. Andrews.

== Route description ==
PR 238 begins at the junction of Provincial Trunk Highway 9 (PTH 9) and PTH 27 near the settlement of Parkdale. It follows a scenic route along the west bank of the Red River north to Lockport, terminating at PTH 44 near the St. Andrews Lock and Dam. River Road itself continues north as a municipal road and ends at PTH 9 near Lower Fort Garry.

== History ==
River Road, or Inner Road, was constructed in the early 1800s to connect settlements along the Red River, such as St. Andrews and St. Clements, to the King's Road (present-day PTH 9) between Upper and Lower Fort Garry. As a parish road during the Red River Settlement-era, it was maintained by the local parishes using statue labour. It later became a provincial road in the late 19th century and then designated as Provincial Road 238 after Manitoba's current secondary road system was established in the 1960s.

== Points of interest ==
There are numerous points of interest along PR 238, including four National Historic Sites:

- St. Andrews-on-the-Red Anglican Church National Historic Site
- St. Andrews Rectory National Historic Site
- Twins Oaks National Historic Site
- St. Andrews Lock and Dam

Provincial and municipal historic sites along PR 238 include:

- Firth (Hay) House
- Scott House
- Captain William Kennedy House

River Road Provincial Park, created in 1997, is located at several sites along the road.

== Gallery ==
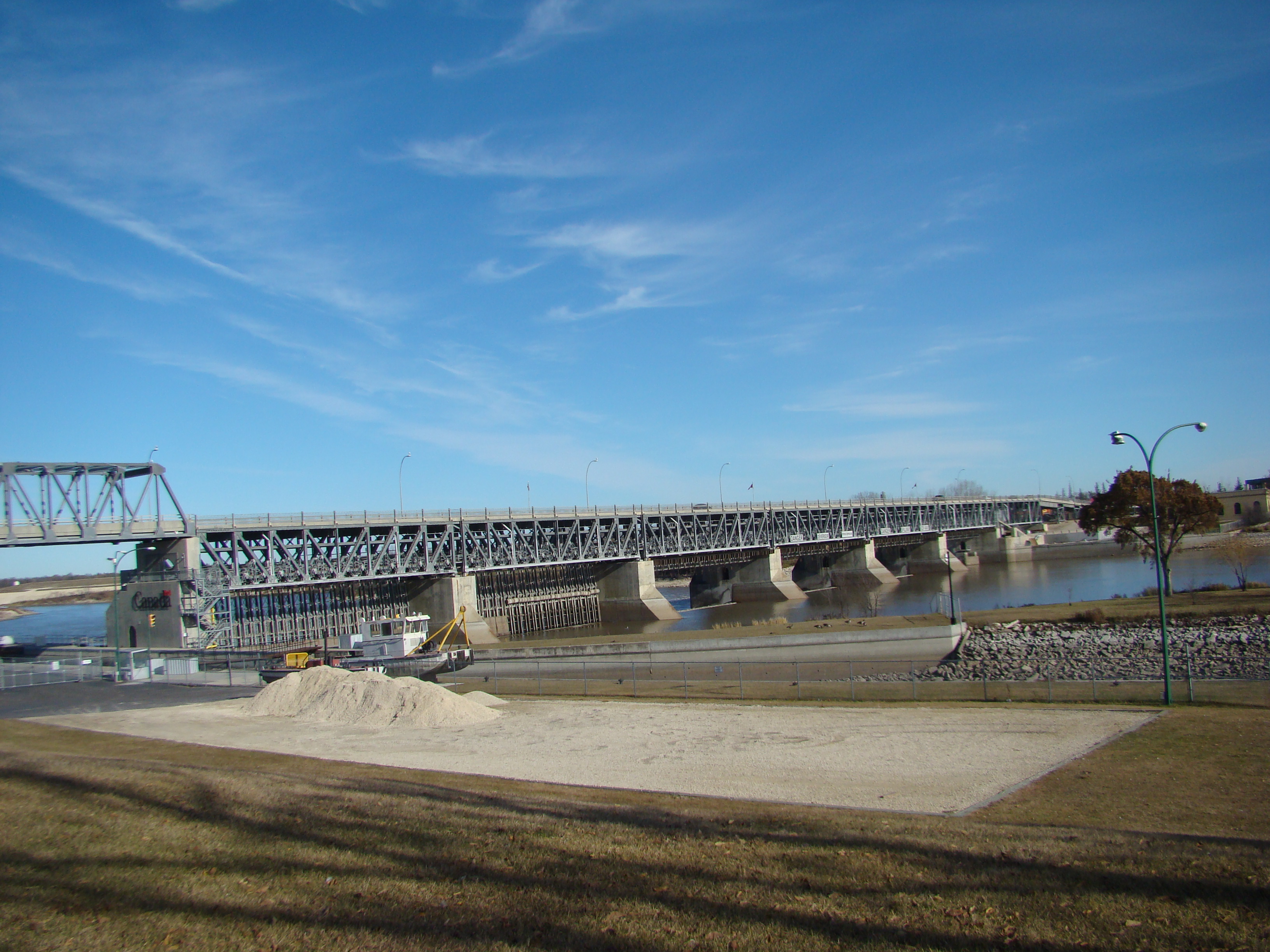
St. Andrews Lock and Dam

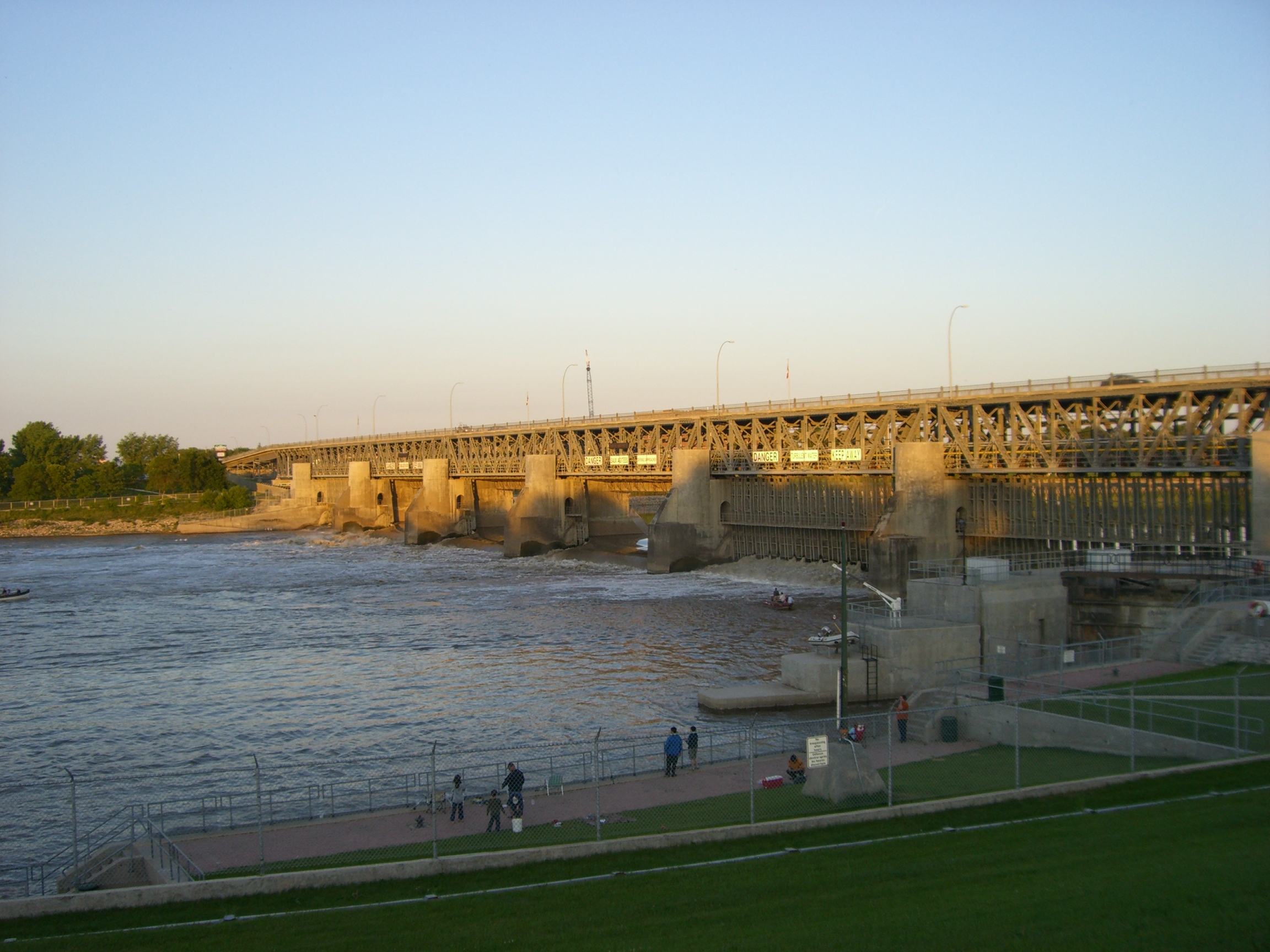
St. Andrews Lock and Dam (north side)

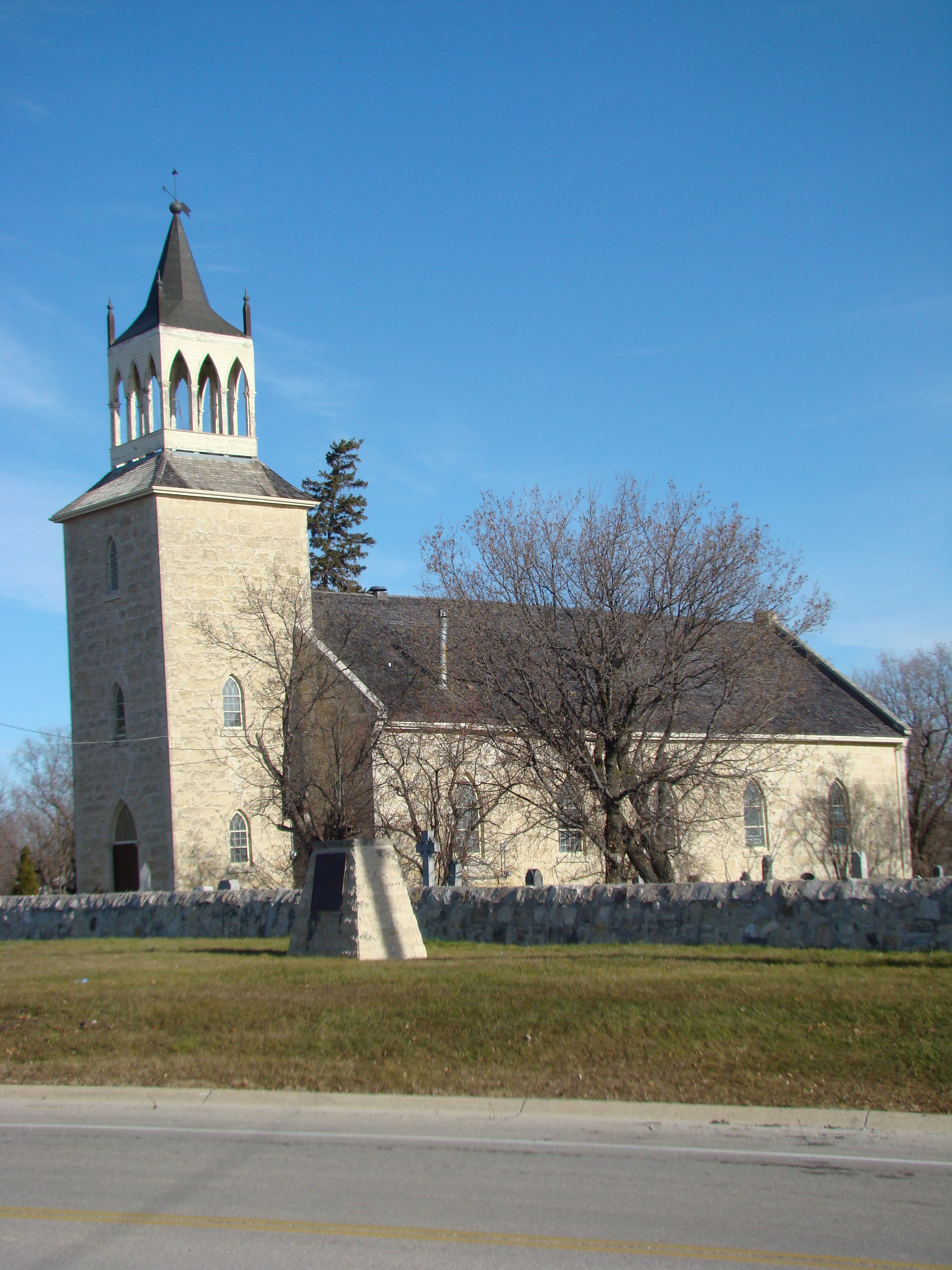
St. Andrews Anglican Church

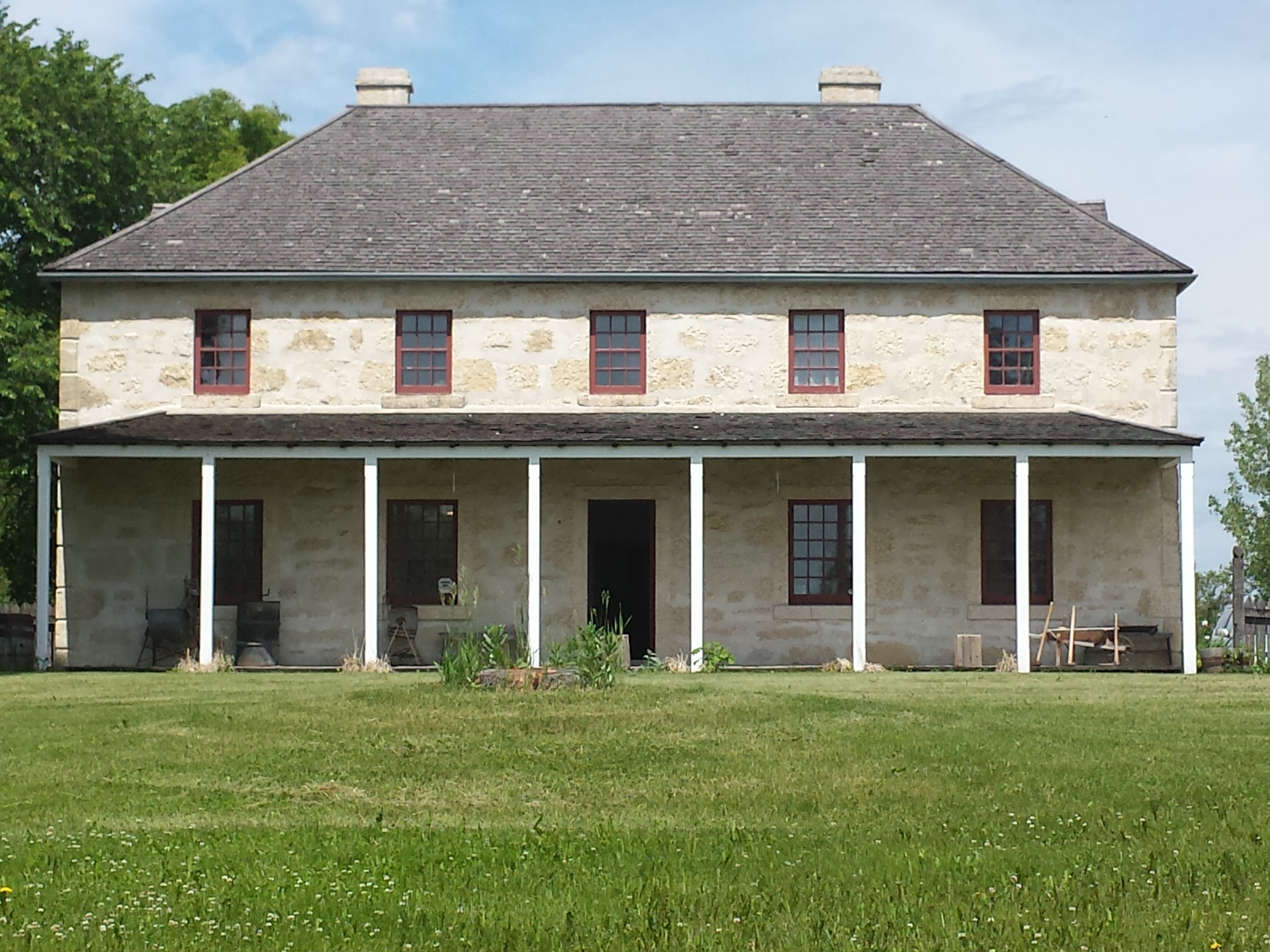
St. Andrews Rectory National Historic Site

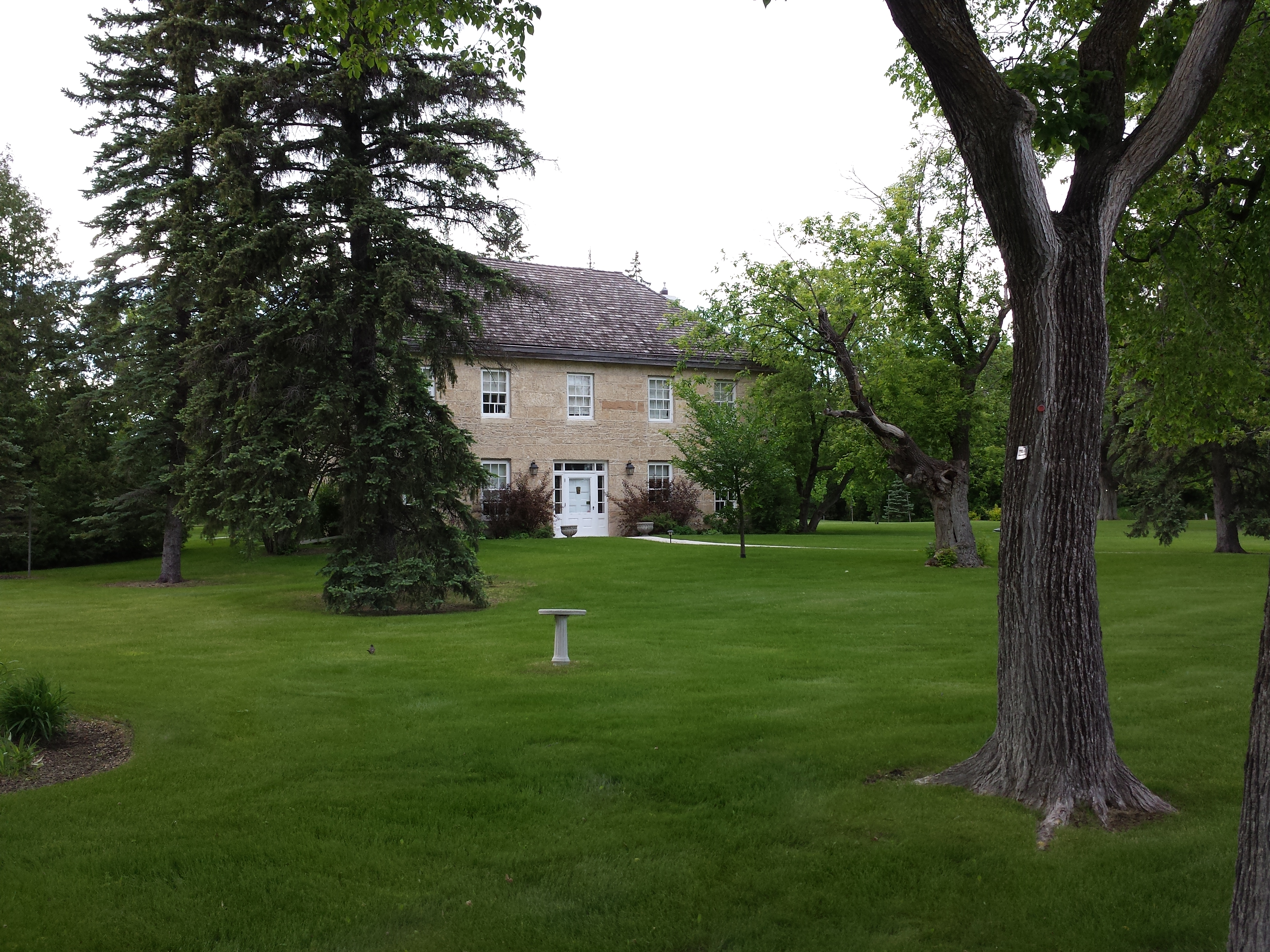
Twin Oaks Residence on River Road.

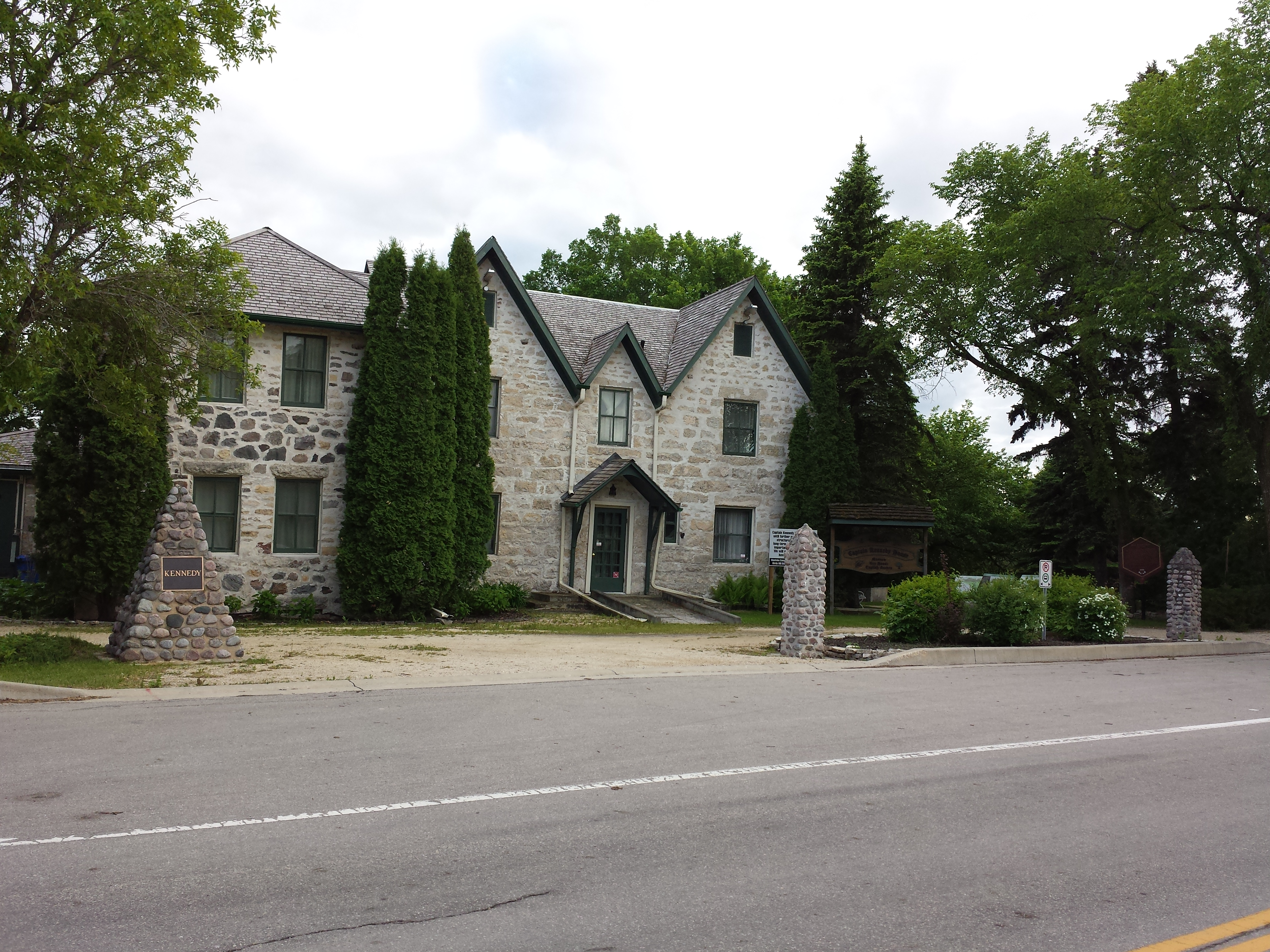
Captain William Kennedy House on River Road

== Major intersections ==
Division	Location	km	mi	Destinations	Notes
St. Andrews		0.0	0.0	PTH 9 (Main Street) – Winnipeg, Selkirk; PTH 27 west (Parkdale Road) – Winnipeg/St. Andrews Airport	Southern terminus; eastern terminus of PTH 27; road continues as PTH 27 west
St. Andrews		6.1	3.8	PR 410 west (St. Andrews Road)	Eastern terminus of PR 410
St. Andrews	Lockport	10.1	6.3	PTH 44 – Selkirk, Beausejour	Northern terminus
1.000 mi = 1.609 km; 1.000 km = 0.621 mi
