= Manitoba Provincial Road 230 =

Provincial road in Manitoba, Canada

Provincial Road 230
- McPhillips Road
- PR 230 highlighted in red

Route information
- Maintained by Department of Infrastructure
- Length: 10.5 km (6.5 mi)
- Existed: 1966–present

Major junctions
- North end: PTH 9 (Selkirk By-Pass) near Selkirk
- PTH 67 near Lower Fort Garry
- South end: PTH 8 near St. Andrews Airport

Location
- Country: Canada
- Province: Manitoba
- Rural municipalities: St. Andrews

Highway system
- Provincial highways in Manitoba; Winnipeg City Routes
← PR 229	→ PR 231

Provincial Road 230 (PR 230), also known as McPhillips Road, is a provincial road in the Canadian province of Manitoba, in the Rural Municipality of St. Andrews. It runs from PTH 8 (also McPhillips Road) to PTH 9 (Selkirk By-Pass).

== Major intersections ==
Division	Location	km	mi	Destinations	Notes
St. Andrews	Parkdale	0.0	0.0	PTH 8 (McPhillips Street / Veterans Memorial Highway) – Gimli	Southern terminus; road continues as Porcher Road
St. Andrews	Parkdale	0.2	0.12	Aviation Boulevard – St. Andrews Airport	
St. Andrews	Rossdale	3.0	1.9	PR 410 east (St. Andrews Road)	Western terminus of PR 410
St. Andrews		9.0	5.6	PTH 67 (Fort Garry Road) – Stonewall, Lower Fort Garry	
St. Andrews		10.5	6.5	PTH 9 (Selkirk Bypass) – Gimli, Selkirk	Northern terminus
1.000 mi = 1.609 km; 1.000 km = 0.621 mi
