= Manitoba Provincial Road 410 =

Provincial Road in Manitoba, Canada

Provincial Road 410
- St. Andrews Road
- PR 410 highlighted in red

Route information
- Maintained by Department of Infrastructure
- Length: 3.3 km (2.1 mi)
- Existed: 1966–present

Major junctions
- West end: PR 230 in Rossdale
- PTH 9 near McDonald
- East end: PR 238 at the St. Andrews Rectory National Historic Site

Location
- Country: Canada
- Province: Manitoba
- Rural municipalities: St. Andrews

Highway system
- Provincial highways in Manitoba; Winnipeg City Routes
← PR 409	→ PR 411

Provincial Road 410 (PR 410) is a short 3.3-kilometre-long (2.1 mi) east–west highway in the Winnipeg Metropolitan Region of Manitoba. Located entirely within the Rural Municipality of St. Andrews, it connects the communities of Rossdale and McDonald with the National Historic Sites of St. Andrews Rectory and St. Andrews on the Red.

== Route description ==
PR 410 begins at an intersection with PR 230 (McPhillips Road) in Rossdale, heading southeast through farmland and rural areas to cross a railway before having an intersection with PTH 9 (Main Street) just south of McDonald. The highway now travels through neighbourhoods to meet its eastern end along the banks of the Red River at an intersection with PR 238 (River Road), sandwiched in between St. Andrews Rectory on the right, and St. Andrews on the Red to the left. The entire length of PR 410 is a paved, two-lane highway.

== Major intersections ==
Division	Location	km	mi	Destinations	Notes
St. Andrews	Rossdale	0.0	0.0	PR 230 (McPhillips Road) – Winnipeg, Selkirk	Western terminus
St. Andrews		2.4	1.5	PTH 9 (Main Street) – Selkirk, Winnipeg	
St. Andrews		3.3	2.1	PR 238 (River Road) – Lees Crossing, Lockport	Eastern terminus
1.000 mi = 1.609 km; 1.000 km = 0.621 mi
