= Lockport Provincial Park =

Provincial park in Manitoba, Canada

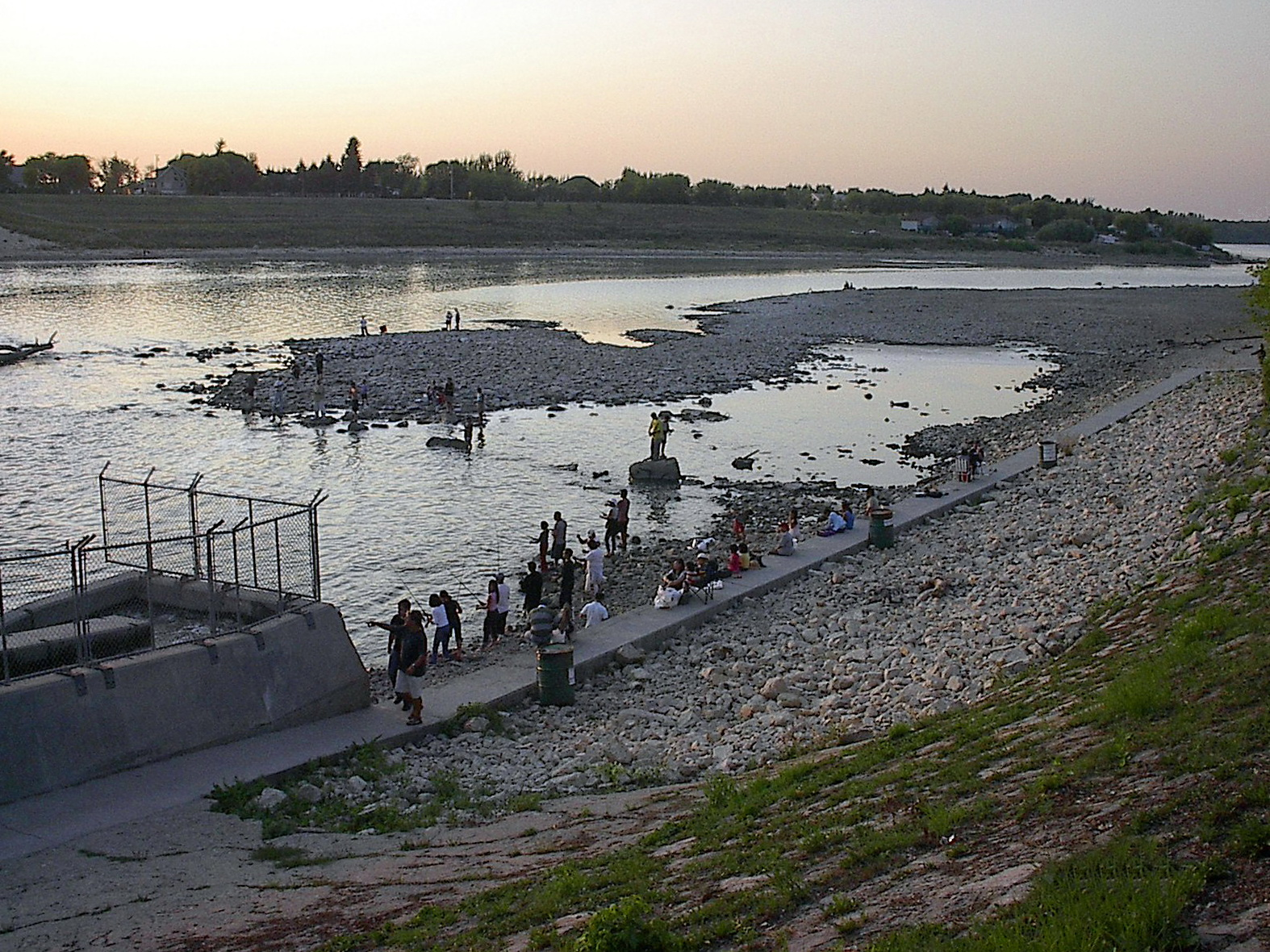
- Fishing below the curtain bridge dam on the Red River at Lockport Provincial Park.

- Location within Manitoba
- Interactive map of Lockport Provincial Park
- Location: Winnipeg Capital Region, Manitoba
- Nearest city: Selkirk, Manitoba
- Coordinates: 50°5′9″N 96°56′11″W
- Area: 2.26 ha (5.6 acres)
- Created: 1997

Lockport Provincial Park is a Manitoba provincial park on the east shore of the Red River in the community of Lockport, Manitoba. It is 2.26 ha (5.6 acres) in size.

Lockport Provincial Park is the location of an important archeological site in Manitoba. From 1984 to 1988, the Manitoba Historic Resources Branch worked on archaeological excavations, uncovering evidence of human activity at the site as early as 3,000 years in the past. In 1985, the Kenosewun Centre was built to allow cataloging and conservation of artifacts from the site. The centre was closed in 2010 after the building was found to be unsafe.

Lockport Provincial Park is one of a number of sites along the Red River which benefited from funding under the Agreement for Recreation and Conservation (ARC) which began in 1973. The site was designated a provincial park in 1997. Together with nearby St. Andrews Caméré Curtain Bridge Dam, Lower Fort Garry, River Road Provincial Park, St Andrew's-on-the-Red Anglican Church and St Andrew's Rectory, the park provides insight into the historical and cultural heritage of the Red River to the peoples of Manitoba.

The park is located within the Gimli ecodistrict of the Interlake Plains ecoregion part of the Boreal Plains ecozone.

== See also ==
- List of protected areas of Manitoba
- List of provincial parks in Manitoba
