= Manitoba Provincial Road 415 =

Provincial Road in Manitoba, Canada

Provincial Road 415
- PR 415 highlighted in red

Route information
- Maintained by Department of Infrastructure
- Length: 60.3 km (37.5 mi)
- Existed: 1966–present

Major junctions
- West end: PTH 6 in St. Laurent
- PR 518 near Harperville PR 416 near Inwood PR 322 near Erinview
- East end: PTH 7 in Teulon

Location
- Country: Canada
- Province: Manitoba
- Rural municipalities: St. Laurent, Armstrong, Woodlands, Rockwood
- Towns: Teulon

Highway system
- Provincial highways in Manitoba; Winnipeg City Routes
← PR 412	→ PR 416

Provincial Road 415 (PR 415) is a 60.3-kilometre-long (37.5 mi) east-west highway in the Interlake Region of Manitoba. Serving as one of the primary east–west routes across the Shoal Lakes, it connects the towns of St. Laurent and Teulon via Harperville and Erinview.

== Route description ==
PR 415 begins in the Rural Municipality of St. Laurent at an intersection with PTH 6 (Northern Woods and Water Route) in the town of St. Laurent near the coastline of Lake Manitoba. It heads due east as a gravel two-lane highway, leaving town travelling through a mix of farmland and wooded areas for several kilometres, where it makes a sudden sharp right at an intersection with Ideal Road, turning south for a short distance. The highway makes a sharp left shortly thereafter at a junction PR 518, heading east again as it travels both through the hamlet of Harperville and along the northern coastlines of both West Shoal Lake and East Shoal Lake. Entering the Rural Municipality of Armstrong, PR 415 now traverses a switchback as it crosses the narrow isthmus separating North Shoal Lake and East Shoal Lake, just prior to having an intersection with PR 416. The highway makes a sharp turn to the south as it enters the Rural Municipality of Woodlands, travelling through remote wooded areas for several kilometres a junction with PR 322, where PR 415 becomes paved as it heads east through the hamlet of Erinview. It the travels several kilometres through rural areas of the Rural Municipality of Rockwood to enter the town of Teulon, running along the southern edge of town to come to an end at an intersection with PTH 7.

== History ==
The section of highway between the junctions with PR 518 and PR 416 was closed for eight years due to roadway both being flooded and eroded away due to severe flooding in both 2011 and 2014, causing all three Shoal Lakes to merge into one. It was finally repaired and reopened in 2019.

== Major intersections ==
Division	Location	km	mi	Destinations	Notes
St. Laurent	St. Laurent	0.0	0.0	PTH 6 (NWWR) – Winnipeg, Ashern	Western terminus
St. Laurent		14.4	8.9	Ideal Road	Former PR 518 north
St. Laurent		16.1	10.0	PR 518 south – Woodlands	Northern terminus of PR 518
Armstrong		29.1	18.1	PR 416 north – Inwood	Southern terminus of PR 416
Woodlands		40.1	24.9	PR 322 south – Argyle	Northern terminus of PR 322; pavement begins
Rockwood	No major junctions				
Town of Teulon		60.3	37.5	PTH 7 – Teulon, Winnipeg	Eastern terminus; road continues east as Road 93N
1.000 mi = 1.609 km; 1.000 km = 0.621 mi

== Related route ==
Provincial Road 416
- Location: Inwood
- Length: 12.5 km (7.8 mi)
- Existed: 1966–present

Provincial Road 416 (PR 416) is a 12.5-kilometre-long (7.8 mi) north-south spur of PR 415 in the Rural Municipality of Armstrong, providing access to the town of Inwood. It is entirely a two-lane gravel road, mostly running along the eastern coastline of North Shoal Lake.

For around eight years, the entire section of PR 416 running along the coastline was closed due to severe flooding in 2011 and 2014. It was finally reopened in 2019.

Division	Location	km	mi	Destinations	Notes
Armstrong		0.0	0.0	PR 415 – St. Laurent, Argyle	Southern terminus
Armstrong	Inwood	12.5	7.8	PTH 17 / PR 229 – Poplarfield, Teulon	Northern terminus
1.000 mi = 1.609 km; 1.000 km = 0.621 mi
