= Janet Cochrane =

Canadian activist (1912–1994)

Janet Cochrane CM, (née Williams; March 1, 1912 – December 6, 1994) was a Canadian community organiser and First Nations activist, who lived and worked her whole life in Manitoba. She received the Order of Canada in 1989 for her activism.

== Early life and family ==
Janet Williams was born March 1, 1912, in Fisher Bay, Manitoba. Her family's original name was Papaniakus when they lived in Norway House, Manitoba, but they had it legally changed to Williams upon settling in Canada. Her father had purchased land and a fishing port and made a comfortable living for his family. Williams had three sisters and two brothers.

She met her future husband Arthur Cochrane, in Fisher River during the summer holidays. Janet attended a Catholic school and Arthur attended a residential school in Brandon, Manitoba. After they married, Arthur went to work for Janet's father, but to do so he had to relinquish all of his treaty rights to work off of the reserve, as it was not possible to live and work in Fisher Bay while maintaining treaty status.

Janet Cochrane had eight children, but four of them died from pneumonia while still infants. She raised two girls, Frances and Margaret, and two sons, Edmund and Lawrence. In 1954, Arthur Cochrane was left blind after a severe, almost fatal illness, and the following year the family had to leave Fisher Bay in order to find better care for Arthur, with Frances staying behind to finish high school. Upon arriving in Winnipeg, Janet went to work as a housekeeper in River Heights, Winnipeg. Her sons and daughter also worked helping to support their family. Janet and Arthur had been married for 47 years when Arthur Cochrane died in 1978.

== Work ==
In 1956, Cochrane and her friend Amy Clements began the process of establishing the Indian and Métis Friendship Centre in Winnipeg, the first Native Friendship Centre in Canada to officially incorporate. It was conceived as a meeting place for First Nation people from the area to meet and share their heritage and experiences. The centre opened in 1958.

In the early days of their movement, the Friendship Centre was largely dependent on volunteers. These volunteers helped with fundraising events and relied on donations and grants from the Municipal, Provincial and Federal Governments. Cochrane and Clements assisted First Nation and Métis people who were moving into urban areas to adjust to city life. Cochrane was an organizer for the movement, and volunteered at the Indian and Métis Friendship Centre in a variety of roles for over 35 years, declining offers to be paid for her work.

In 1984, Cochrane and her daughter Frances, who was also a volunteer at the Indian and Métis Friendship Centre, applied for a grant at the Core Area Initiative to establish the first seniors' housing complex for First Nation Elders in Manitoba, located in the centre of Winnipeg. A second phase of the project had the aim of establishing on-site healthcare services for the resident First Nation Elders, but has never been implemented.

== Awards and recognition ==
On April 20, 1989, Cochrane was recognized for her contributions and was nominated to receive the Order of Canada. Initially turning the award down, she subsequently changed her mind, and on October 18, 1989, she attended the investiture ceremony at Rideau Hall in Ottawa to accept the award on behalf of all First Nation People.

Cochrane has also been acknowledged for her work from the Indian and Métis Friendship Centre. The centre has named a hall after her, and had several portraits painted of her. She was a long-time member of the Native Women's Association of Canada and was the President of the Indian and Métis Senior Citizen's Group of Winnipeg.

== Death ==
Cochrane died from cancer at the Princess Elizabeth Hospital in Winnipeg on December 6, 1994, aged 82.
