= Shoal Lakes (Manitoba) =

Group of lakes in Manitoba, Canada

Coordinates: 50.3678°N 97.6089°W

Location of Shoal Lakes in Manitoba

The Shoal Lakes are lakes located in the southern Interlake region of Manitoba in Canada between Lake Winnipeg and Lake Manitoba. They refer to North Shoal Lake, West Shoal Lake, and East Shoal Lake. The surrounding territory is generally cattle pasture, with some rocky areas. Because of the flat nature of the surrounding terrain, small fluctuations in water level significantly affect the local habitat. The lakes are a significant location for migrating and nesting waterfowl.

== History ==
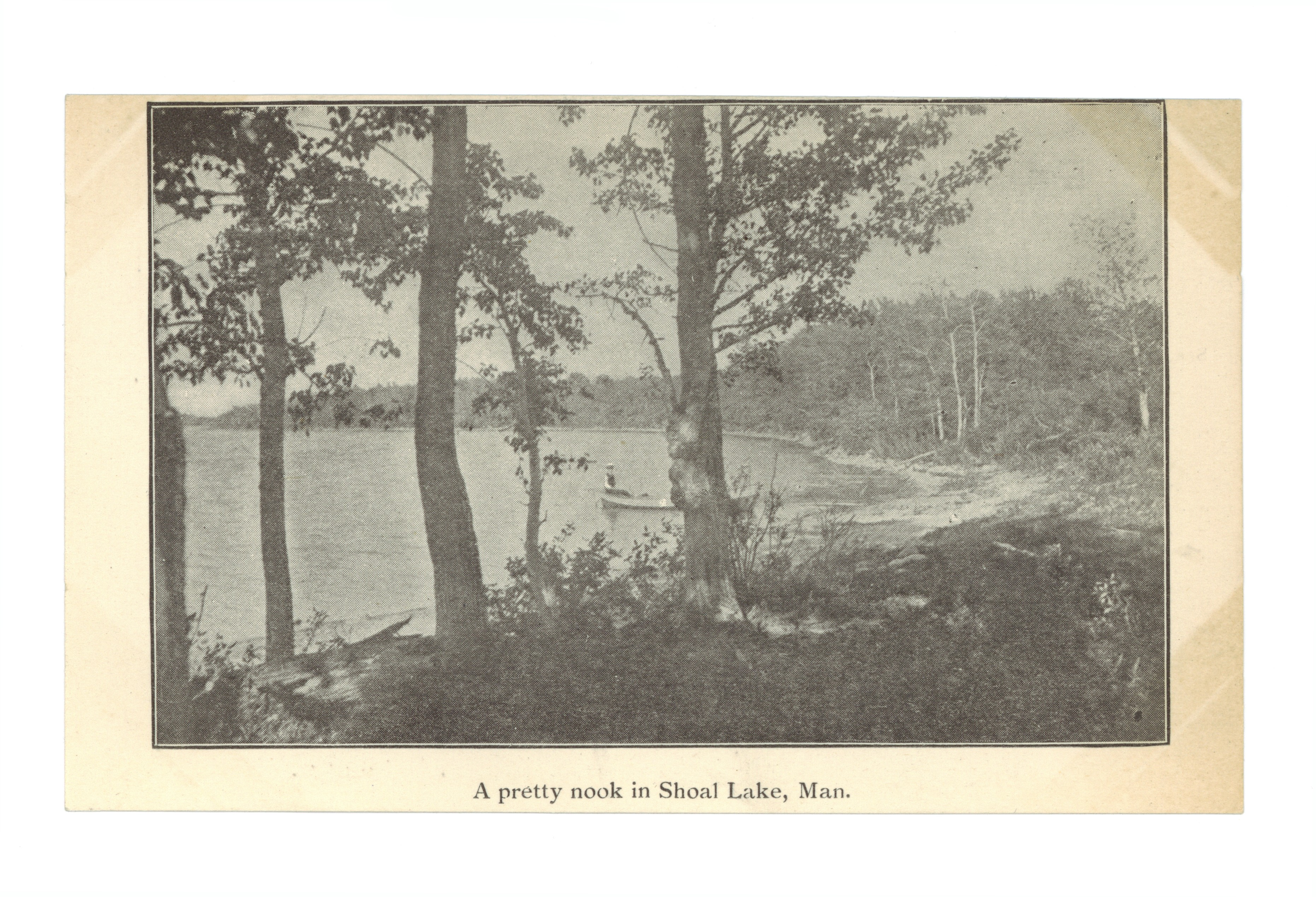
A view of Shoal Lake through the trees in 1910

The three lakes were originally one lake. In 1912 the Wagon Creek Drain was constructed and the water level fell four to five metres, creating three separate alkaline lakes containing a number of islands.

=== 2010 flood ===
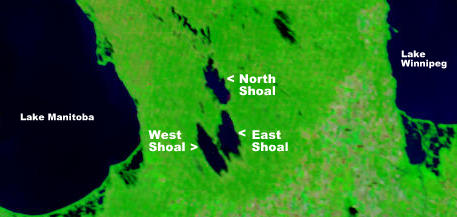
NASA image of the Shoal Lakes in 2008

In 2010 the three lakes flooded into one lake, leaving Provincial Road 229 west of Highway 17 underwater and damaged for 2.5 miles. PR 518 (Ideal Road) was underwater for one mile south of PR 415, and PR 415 west of Inwood, Manitoba was underwater for 2–3 miles.

== Ecological Significance ==
The Nature Conservancy of Canada's Lake Ranch project is a large tract of tall-grass prairie, wetland and forest along the east shore of East Shoal Lake.

== See also ==
- List of lakes of Manitoba
