= 1826 Red River flood =

Flood in what is now Manitoba, Canada

The 1826 Red River Flood was a devastating flood that took place along the Red River in Manitoba. The flood was the largest to impact the Winnipeg area (reaching a peak flow 40% above that of the 1997 Red River flood), and was exacerbated by high winds and ice jams. The flooding caused a redistribution of population in the Red River Valley, affected the placement of the Canadian Pacific Railway line, and greatly influenced future disaster planning in the province.

== Background ==
The winter of 1825-1826 was notably cold and snowy, beginning with “a very wet, disagreeable fall.” During the winter, a sustained snowstorm covered the buffalo herd the community was using for sustenance, causing hunters to lose their trail. This resulted in famine at the same time as the intense cold caused water sources to freeze exceptionally thick. Starting in April, a rapid thaw began combined with heavy rain. Ice jams on rivers initially held back the water, causing swelling upstream.

== Flood ==
On May 3, 1826, the ice jam on the Red River broke, causing water levels to begin to rise. May 5 was the start of significant flooding, with a first-hand account of Francis Heron of the Hudson’s Bay Company reporting 47 houses destroyed at Fort Garry. Occupants of the town fled to Stonewall Ridge in the west and Birds Hill in the east. At the maximum extent of the flood, the entire 27 km span between these two points was under water, leading to the river being described as a “large lake”.

The flooding continued to worsen over the coming weeks. On May 7, an ice jam on the Assiniboine River, a tributary of the Red River, broke, flooding that river. Heron reports evacuees from the flooded Fort Garry moving progressively up the Assiniboine as the water levels rose daily. The settlers moved with their cattle and furniture. The Hudson’s Bay Company boats were used as rescue boats for stranded residents. There was limited food and it was impossible to fish, so the settlers subsisted on waterfowl. On May 21, a fire broke out in a clergy tent but, fortunately it “soon got under, there being plenty of help and a good supply of water”.

It wasn’t until May 23 that the water began to subside, thanks to another ice jam breaking at the estuary where the Red River met Lake Winnipeg. The water had peaked about 11 m above its normal level, and only 3 churches and a grist mill survived the inundation. The settlers didn’t re-occupy their land until mid-June and re-sow fields until late June. All told, 8 Europeans, and a Métis man and 3 children, died.

== Aftermath ==
The flood massively disrupted the Red River settlement. The flooding caused many to lose all they had and therefore abandon the area. Many Canadiens chose to return to Canada. A group of 243 recently-arrived German Swiss chose to depart south, mostly for Mendota, Minnesota. The Hudson’s Bay Company, which had opposed settlement and wanted growth only “by natural increase of the population,” supported them in their departure.

== See also ==
- 1950 Red River flood
