= Fisher Bay, Manitoba =

Coordinates: 51.479°N 97.306°W

Fisher Bay is a community in the Interlake Region of Manitoba.

== Demographics ==
In the 2021 Census of Population conducted by Statistics Canada, Fisher Bay had a population of 42 living in 16 of its 22 total private dwellings, a change of 23.5% from its 2016 population of 34. With a land area of 56.85 km^{2} (21.95 sq mi), it had a population density of 0.7/km^{2} (1.9/sq mi) in 2021.

Fisher Bay was mentioned in the song "Gospel First Nation" by William Prince.

== Notable people ==
- Janet Cochrane
