= Fisher Bay Provincial Park =

Provincial park in Manitoba, Canada

- IUCN category II (national park)
- Location within Manitoba
- Location: Manitoba, Canada
- Nearest city: Winnipeg, Manitoba
- Coordinates: 51°39′40″N 97°10′9″W
- Area: 84,150 km^{2} (32,490 sq mi)
- Established: 2011
- Governing body: Government of Manitoba

Fisher Bay Provincial Park is located along the western shore of Lake Winnipeg near the mouth of the Fisher River. It was designated as a provincial park by the Government of Manitoba in 2011. The park is 84,150 square kilometres (32,490 sq mi) in size. The park is considered to be a Class II protected area under the International Union for Conservation of Nature protected area management categories.

The land within the park continues to be used by the Fisher River Cree Nation for traditional activities. This First Nation worked with partners in environmental groups and the provincial government to gain the protection of the Provincial Parks Act legislation for the land that their people have used for generations.

== See also ==
- List of protected areas of Manitoba
