= Petersfield, Manitoba =

Place in Manitoba

Coordinates: 50°26′09″N 96°57′50″W

Petersfield is located in the Rural Municipality of St. Andrews in Manitoba, Canada. It was the birthplace of First Nation war hero and community activist Tommy Prince. Petersfield, old town name was St. Louis

In Summer, Petersfield plays host to the Petersfield Community Club Mallard Park Market, a popular local destination for locally handmade crafts, baking, vegetables, etc.
