= Dunnottar, Manitoba =

Village in the Interlake region of Manitoba

Dunnottar
- Village
- Municipality of Dunnottar
- Municipal boundaries

- Location within Manitoba
- Coordinates: 50°27′14″N 96°56′50″W
- Country: Canada
- Province: Manitoba
- Region: Interlake and Winnipeg Metro
- Established: January 1, 1948; 78 years ago
- Named for: Dunnottar Castle

Government
  - Mayor: Richard Gamble
  - MP: James Bezan
  - MLA: Derek Johnson

Area
  - Total: 2.78 km^{2} (1.07 sq mi)
- Elevation: 217 m (712 ft)

Population (2021)
  - Total: 989
  - Density: 356/km^{2} (921/sq mi)
- Time zone: UTC−6 (CST)
  - Summer (DST): UTC−5 (CDT)
- Postal Code: R0C 2B0
- Area codes: 204, 431
- Website: dunnotar.ca

The Village of Dunnottar is a village in the Canadian province of Manitoba. As part of the Interlake and Metro regions, the municipality is located on the shores of Lake Winnipeg, just off Highway 9, south of Winnipeg Beach.

It encompasses the communities of Ponemah, Whytewold, and Matlock. These centres grew around Canadian Pacific Railway stations. It borders the Rural Municipality of St. Andrews, which surrounds it in three directions. It is on the southwest shore of Lake Winnipeg. It is known for its beaches which are frequented by many summer residents and visitors.

== History ==
The Village takes its name from Dunnottar Castle in Scotland.

In 1903, a Canadian Pacific Railway station was built. It has since been turned into the Dunnottar Station Museum, which hosts railway artifacts and community items.

In June 1947, it was announced that the area of current-day Village of Dunnottar would have a meeting to create the municipal government. The meeting was held at 177 McDermot Avenue in the city of Winnipeg. Municipal elections were held later that year in November, officially becoming a village as of 1 January 1948.

Thereafter, Albert J. Smale became Dunnottar's first Mayor. The municipal clerk's office would be located in the Canada Permanent building (298 Garry Street) in Winnipeg.

== Demographics ==
In the 2021 Census of Population conducted by Statistics Canada, Dunnottar had a population of 989 living in 496 of its 1,206 total private dwellings, a change of 29.6% from its 2016 population of 763. With a land area of 2.8 km^{2} (1.1 sq mi), it had a population density of 353.2/km^{2} (914.8/sq mi) in 2021.
