= Winnipeg Beach =

- Town
- Town boundaries

- Location within Manitoba
- Coordinates: 50°30′21″N 096°58′27″W
- Country: Canada
- Province: Manitoba
- Region: Interlake

Area
  - Total: 3.87 km^{2} (1.49 sq mi)

Population (2021)
  - Total: 1,439
  - Density: 372/km^{2} (963/sq mi)
- Area codes: 204 and 431
- Website: www.winnipegbeach.ca

Winnipeg Beach is a town in the Interlake Region, in the Canadian province of Manitoba. The town was founded in 1900 by Sir William Whyte and is located at the junction of Highway 9 and Highway 229 on the southwestern shore of Lake Winnipeg, about 56 kilometres (35 mi) north of Winnipeg. It is bordered by the Rural Municipality of Gimli, the Rural Municipality of St. Andrews, and Dunnottar as well as Lake Winnipeg. Nearby towns are Ponemah, Whytewold, and Matlock (all to the south), Gimli, and Sandy Hook, (located to the north), as well as Teulon, and Selkirk. Its permanent population is 1,439 (as of 2021)

== History ==
In 1900, the Canadian Pacific Railway (CPR) purchased 13 hectares (32 acres) of undeveloped shoreline 65 kilometres north of Winnipeg on the southwestern shore of Lake Winnipeg and commenced construction of a resort town. In addition to the attraction of a three kilometre stretch of sandy beach, the CPR also built and offered an array of accommodation, recreation, and amusement facilities, including a prominent dance hall.

In the early 1900s, ritzy hotels lined the main street of Winnipeg Beach. Piers, parks and picnic grounds were constructed to accommodate the weekend masses that would travel to Winnipeg Beach from the nearby capital city. By 1913, the summer retreat had become so popular that the CPR had 13 trains running the line between the beach and the City of Winnipeg. The famous Moonlight Special returned to the city at midnight every Saturday for fifty years. The round trip fare was only fifty cents.

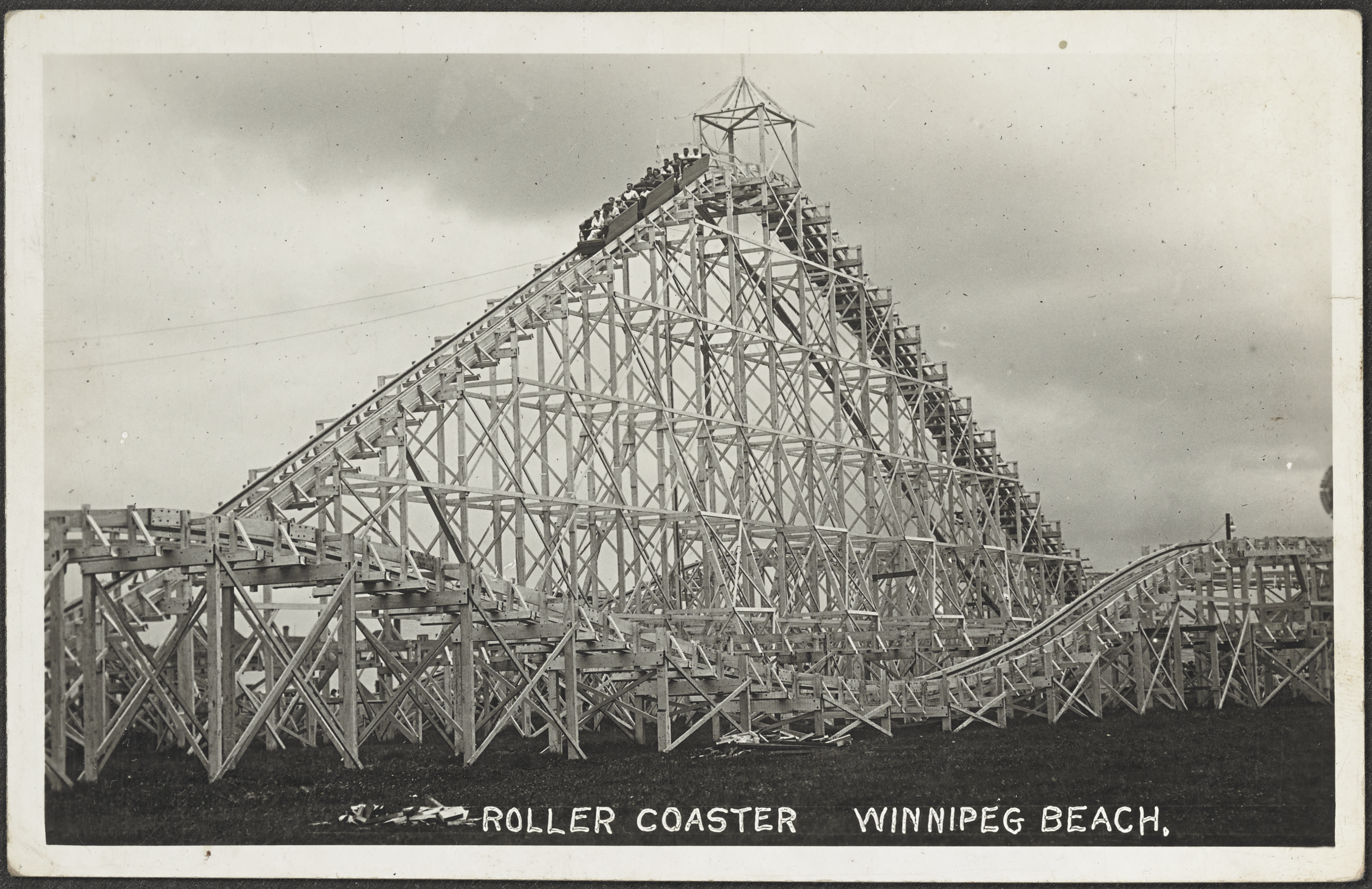
Vintage postcard of the wooden roller coaster at Winnipeg Beach

A boardwalk took strollers along the beach to the carnival concessions and cottages. A wooden roller coaster was one of the largest in the country at the time and carried hundreds of passengers on a busy day. The Pavilion housed a 1,300-square-metre (14,000 sq ft) dance floor, reputed to be the largest in Western Canada.

The romance of Winnipeg Beach began to wane during the 1950s, and although the beach itself still remained a popular destination, in 1964 the amusement park was permanently closed.

=== Water tower ===
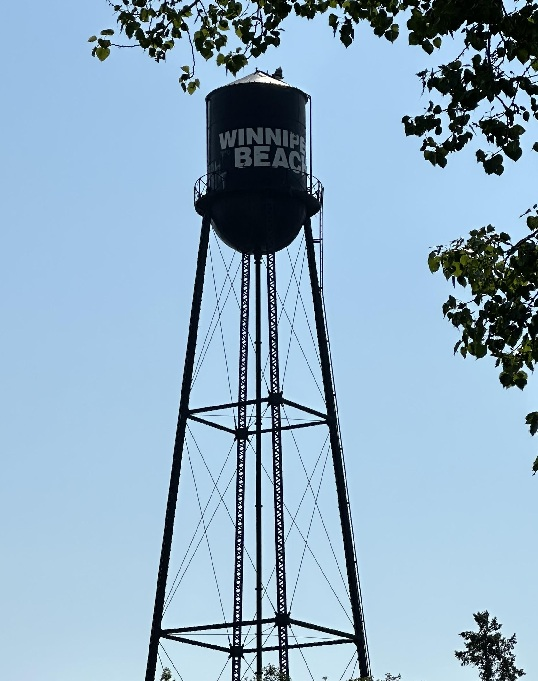
The water tower in Winnipeg Beach, Manitoba

Of the many recreation and railway related structures erected by the CPR at Winnipeg Beach, only the steel water tower survives. It was designed and constructed in 1928 by the Vulcan Iron Works Ltd. of Winnipeg. Utilitarian in design and appearance, the 40-metre-high (130 ft) tower supported a 90,000-litre (20,000 imp gal; 24,000 US gal) capacity tank and provided a source of pressurized water for the CPR steam locomotives and fire protection services for the resort's facilities. Non-operational since the resort closed, the structure is the best example of only five surviving riveted-steel water towers in Manitoba. As in its heyday, the tower is a prominent visual landmark in and around the beach community.

== Today ==
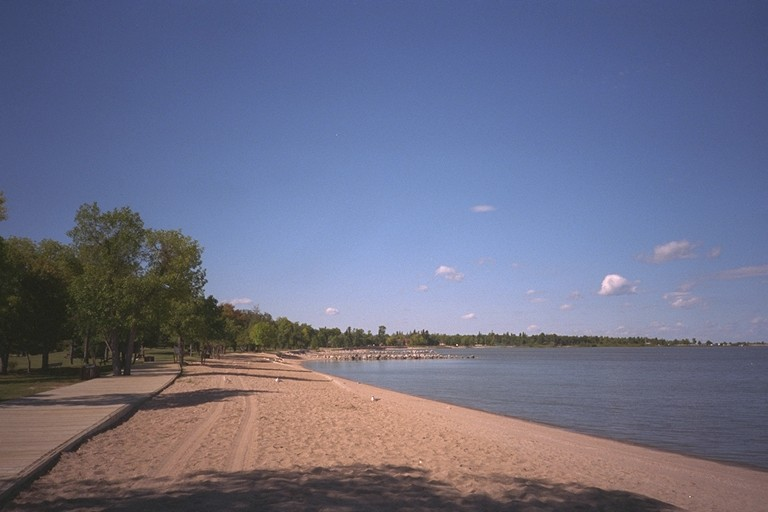
Winnipeg Beach on Lake Winnipeg

After the closure of the resort and amusement facilities at Winnipeg Beach, the Province of Manitoba attempted to revitalize the town by creating a recreation park, Winnipeg Beach Provincial Park, in the 1960s, with various improvements to the beach and the parks lining it. A restaurant and lounge and several change-room structures were built, in addition to a large parking lot. The recreation park continues to be a popular destination for beachgoers. The Town has also built a skateboarding park, to stimulate the youth community.

The Global Television Network TV series Falcon Beach was filmed in the town during the summers of 2005–2006.

Several different residential summer camps, including Camp Massad of Manitoba, lie just north of the town.

Boardwalk Day is an annual event during the summer. It consists of a carnival, market, outdoor food court, fireworks, and a live band performance.

The town is governed by a mayor (most recently Stan Porter) and a five-member town council, the town is currently under provincial administrative control because of a loss of quorum to do official business:

== Demographics ==
In the 2021 Census of Population conducted by Statistics Canada, Winnipeg Beach had a population of 1,439 living in 757 of its 1,661 total private dwellings, a change of 25.7% from its 2016 population of 1,145. With a land area of 3.91 km^{2} (1.51 sq mi), it had a population density of 368.0/km^{2} (953.2/sq mi) in 2021.
