= Dallas/Red Rose, Manitoba =

Coordinates: 51.399°N 97.528°W

Dallas/Red Rose is a designated northern community in the Canadian province of Manitoba, consisting of the adjacent communities of Dallas and Red Rose. The communities had a total population of 159 as of the 2016 census, up from 45 in the 2006 census.

Dallas/Red Rose is situated between the Peguis First Nation and Fisher River Cree Nation, about 215 kilometres north of Winnipeg near the western shore of Lake Winnipeg. The community is administered under the Northern Affairs Act by a mayor and council.

== Demographics ==
In the 2021 Census of Population conducted by Statistics Canada, Dallas/Red Rose had a population of 40 living in 21 of its 26 total private dwellings, a change of 0% from its 2016 population of 40. With a land area of 317.9 km^{2} (122.7 sq mi), it had a population density of 0.1/km^{2} (0.3/sq mi) in 2021.
