= Kinonjeoshtegon First Nation =

First Nations band in Manitoba, Canada

Coordinates: 51.903°N 97.308°W

The Kinonjeoshtegon First Nation (Ojibwe: Ginoozhewishtigwaaning) is a band of Chippewa Indigenous Peoples in the Interlake Region of Manitoba. The Reserves associated with this band are Jackhead 43 and Jackhead 43A. Jackhead has a population of 600. The on-reserve the population is under 200.
