= Lower Fort Garry =

Historic fort in St. Andrews, Manitoba, Canada

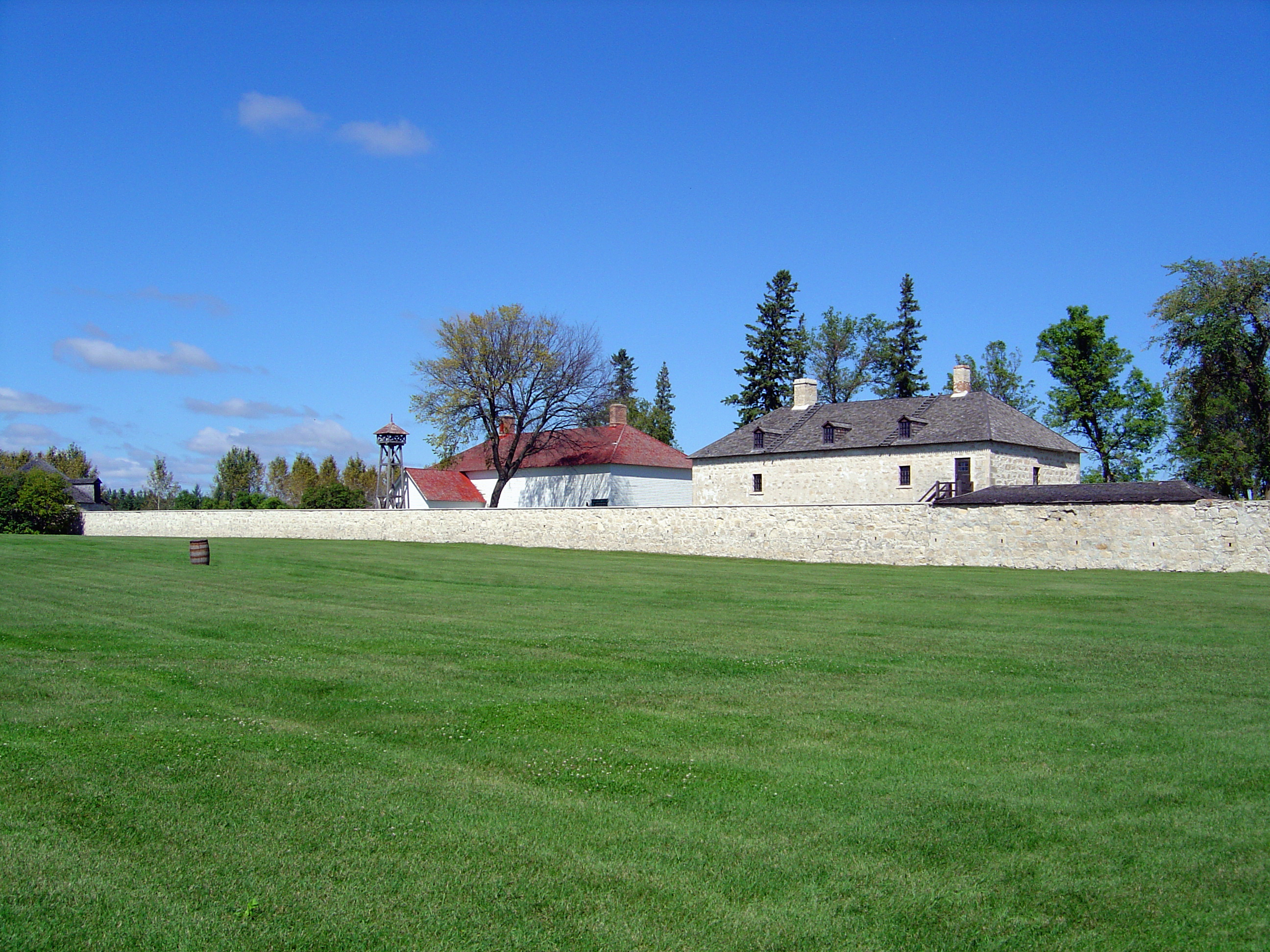
- View from outside Lower Fort Garry

- Location within Manitoba
- 50°06′44″N 96°55′55″W
- Location: 5925 Highway 9 St. Andrews, Manitoba, Canada

History
- Built: 1830
- Built by: Hudson's Bay Company
- Original use: Supply depot and trading post

Site notes
- Current use: Living museum and National Historic Site
- Governing body: Parks Canada
- Owner: Government of Canada

National Historic Site of Canada
- Official name: Lower Fort Garry National Historic Site of Canada
- Designated: 31 May 1950

Lower Fort Garry is a former Hudson's Bay Company fort and present-day National Historic Site in the Rural Municipality of St. Andrews, Manitoba, Canada. Built in 1830 on the west bank of the Red River, about 20 mi (32 km) north of Fort Garry in present-day Winnipeg, it served primarily as a supply and distribution centre for the Hudson's Bay Company's Northern Department and became an important centre of transportation and industry in the Red River Settlement.

Lower Fort Garry was the site of the signing of Treaty No. 1 on 3 August 1871, the first of the Numbered Treaties between the Crown and First Nations in western Canada. During the nineteenth century, the fort also served as a military post, the first training base of the North-West Mounted Police, and a provincial and federal penitentiary. In the twentieth century, it operated as a private country club before being restored by Parks Canada as a living museum and National Historic Site.

== Site ==
Lower Fort Garry stands on the west bank of the Red River in present-day St. Andrews, Manitoba, about 20 mi (32 km) north of the original Fort Garry in present-day Winnipeg, Manitoba.

== Early history ==
After the 1826 Red River flood destroyed Fort Garry, George Simpson, governor of the Hudson's Bay Company (HBC), searched for a safer location for a new fort. He chose the site because of its high ground and its location below the St. Andrew's Rapids, eliminating a time-consuming portage of heavy fur packs and York boats. Construction began in 1830, and Lower Fort Garry was intended to become the HBC's administrative centre. However, most of the area's population remained centred at The Forks and objected to the additional travel required to conduct business at the new fort. As a result, Upper Fort Garry was rebuilt in stone near its original location at The Forks.

== Construction ==
Construction of Lower Fort Garry began in 1830 after the Hudson's Bay Company (HBC) decided to replace Fort Garry, which had been destroyed in the 1826 Red River flood. Unlike many fur trade posts in western Canada, which were built mainly of wood, Lower Fort Garry was constructed largely of limestone, making it one of the oldest surviving stone fur trade forts in North America.

Construction continued for nearly two decades. The first permanent buildings were the Fur Loft, which housed the company store, trading office and a small warehouse, and the Big House, which served as the residence of the governor and other senior company officials. Over time, the Men's House, a second warehouse, bakehouse, blacksmith shop, powder magazine and icehouse were added.

The fort's enclosing walls were completed in 1848 by soldiers of the British Army's 6th Regiment of Foot during their deployment to the Red River Settlement. Four corner bastions were incorporated into the walls and housed the powder magazine, bakehouse, icehouse and one of the warehouses. Although the walls gave the fort the appearance of a fortress, they were intended mainly to protect company property rather than defend against military attack.

Lower Fort Garry preserves several building techniques that were widely used in the Red River Settlement during the nineteenth century. Most of the fort's principal buildings are constructed of limestone masonry. The Farm Manager's House preserves Red River Frame construction, a local building method that combined heavy timber with vertical log infill. The Men's House and Big House Annex were built using half-timbered (colombage pierroté) construction, in which a timber frame was filled with stone rubble and covered with stucco.

== Hudson's Bay Company operations ==
From its establishment in 1830, Lower Fort Garry served primarily as a supply and distribution centre for the fur trade of the Hudson's Bay Company's Northern Department, although it also traded a small amount of furs. The fort supported the Red River Settlement and the surrounding Cree, Anishinaabe, Métis, and European (primarily Orkney Scot) communities. Furs collected at posts throughout the Northern Department were brought to Lower Fort Garry before being shipped to England through York Factory. In return, the fort traded manufactured goods to local farmers and hunters in exchange for produce used to provision company treks into the north.

For three decades, Lower Fort Garry's agricultural and industrial production supplied many of the materials needed to support the fur trade. The fort provided food, livestock, York boats, and labour for the Hudson's Bay Company's operations across Rupert's Land.

By the 1860s, Lower Fort Garry had become a focus for industry and transport. The complex included a flour mill, sawmill, forge, and brewery.

== Military action ==
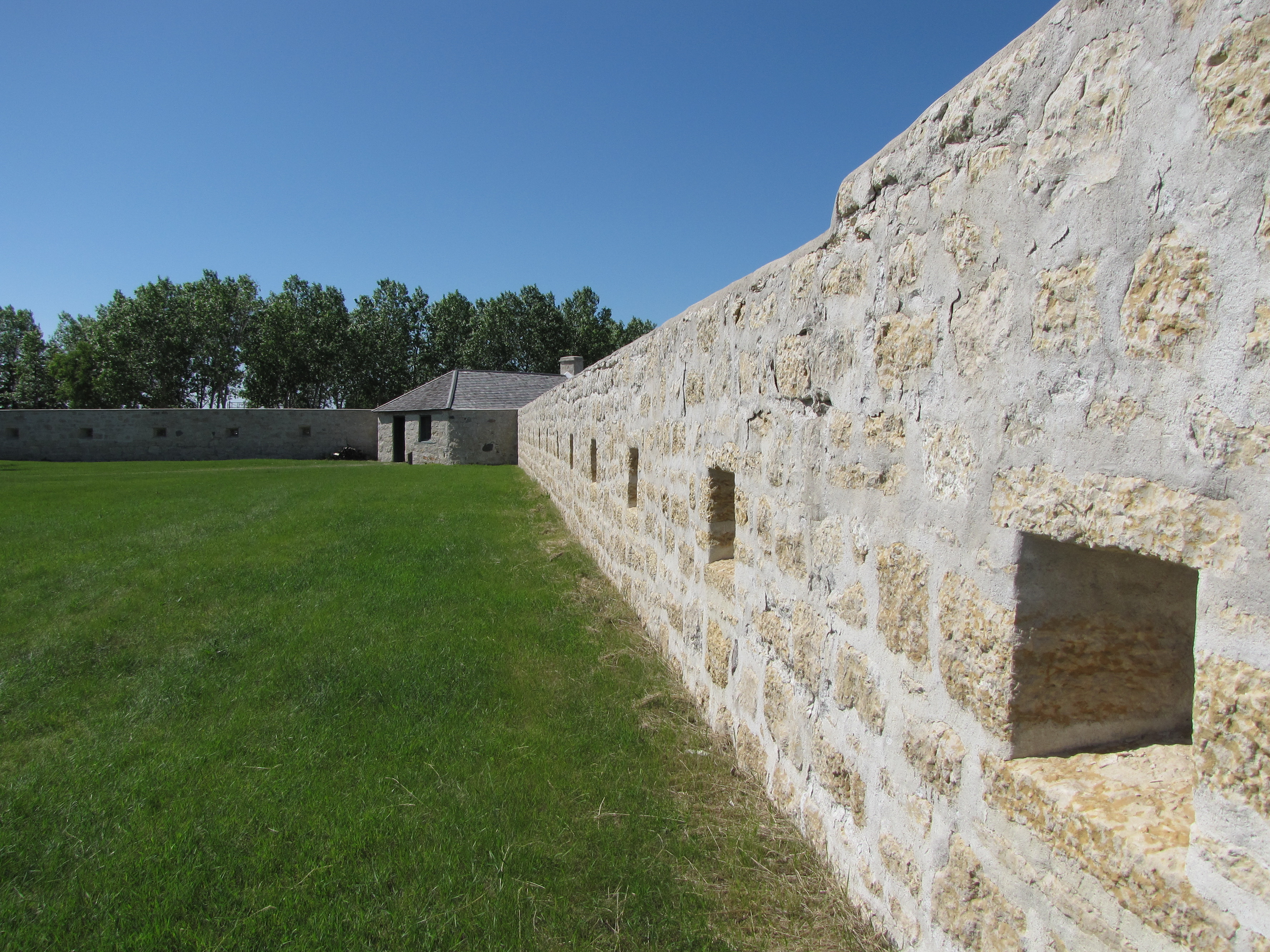
The walls of Lower Fort Garry were completed in 1848.

Although Lower Fort Garry was built primarily as a trading post and administrative centre, it occasionally served as a military post during periods of regional tension. In October 1846, the British Army's 6th Regiment of Foot, commanded by Major John Folliott Crofton, arrived at the fort after the Hudson's Bay Company requested troops during the Oregon boundary dispute between Britain and the United States. The regiment was officially sent to defend British interests in the interior, while the company also hoped its presence would help maintain order in the Red River Colony. By the time the soldiers reached the settlement, however, the immediate risk of conflict had passed.

The fort was adapted to accommodate the regiment. The Big House was used to house the officers, while Hudson's Bay Company business was temporarily moved outside the walls to make room for the soldiers. Over the next two years, the regiment completed the fort's defensive stone walls, which were finished in 1848.

During the Red River Resistance of 1869–1870, Louis Riel and the Métis provisional government occupied Upper Fort Garry. After the Wolseley Expedition reached the Red River Settlement in August 1870, the 2nd Battalion (Quebec Rifles) was quartered at Lower Fort Garry, while the 1st Battalion (Ontario Rifles) occupied Upper Fort Garry. By then, Riel and many of his supporters had already withdrawn, and no fighting took place at Lower Fort Garry.

== Other uses ==
Although Lower Fort Garry was built as a Hudson's Bay Company trading post and supply depot, it also served a variety of other purposes during and after the company's occupation of the site. During the late 19th and 20th centuries, the fort functioned as a provincial and federal penitentiary, a temporary psychiatric hospital, a private country club and golf course, and, eventually, a museum and National Historic Site.

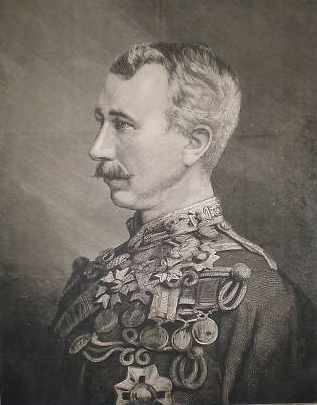
In August 1870, Lower Fort Garry briefly housed members of the [[Wolseley Expedition]], a force of 1,214 British regulars and Canadian militia led by Major General [[Garnet Wolseley, 1st Viscount Wolseley|Garnet Wolseley]].

=== Wolseley Expedition quarters (1870) ===
In August 1870, Lower Fort Garry briefly housed members of the Wolseley Expedition, a force of 1,214 British regulars and Canadian militia led by Colonel Garnet Wolseley. The expedition was sent to the Red River Settlement following the Red River Resistance, an 1869–1870 uprising led by Louis Riel, to oversee the transfer of Rupert's Land to the Government of Canada. After a demanding 94-day journey of more than 2,100 km (1,300 mi) by steamship, canoe, and overland portages, the force reached Upper Fort Garry on 24 August 1870.

Although the expedition's destination was Upper Fort Garry, some of its soldiers were quartered at Lower Fort Garry. They stayed in the fort's large stone warehouse, originally built in about 1838 to store Hudson's Bay Company (HBC) trade goods. The warehouse had already served as barracks for British troops during the Oregon boundary dispute in the 1840s.

The soldiers remained at the fort only briefly before continuing their duties in the Red River Settlement. During their stay, some carved their names into the east gate pillars, where several inscriptions remain visible today.

=== Treaty No. 1 (1871) ===
Lower Fort Garry was the site of the signing of Treaty No. 1 on 3 August 1871, the first of the eleven Numbered Treaties between the Crown and First Nations in western Canada. The agreement concluded eight days of negotiations between Crown commissioner Wemyss Simpson and representatives of seven Anishinaabe (Ojibway/Saulteaux) and Swampy Cree First Nations. During the negotiations, more than 2,000 Anishinaabe and Swampy Cree people camped around the fort.

The treaty was negotiated one year after the transfer of Rupert's Land to Canada in 1870. Under its terms, the First Nations agreed to share a large area of what is now southern Manitoba with the Crown in exchange for reserves, annual payments, farming assistance, and other promises. Disagreements over the treaty's meaning arose almost immediately. In 1875, the federal government issued the "Outside Promises" memorandum, acknowledging that oral commitments made during the negotiations had not been included in the written treaty.

=== North-West Mounted Police training (1873–1874) ===
Training of the North-West Mounted Police took place at Lower Fort Garry during the winter of 1873–1874. Many members of the first contingent had already served during the Red River Resistance of 1869–1870, including Inspector James F. MacLeod, who had met Mary Drever at the fort. The first contingent arrived at Lower Fort Garry on 22 October 1873. Twelve days later, on 3 November, the recruits were sworn in before beginning their training.

During the following winter, the recruits drilled, learned to ride and prepared for the March West. The parade ground froze as hard as concrete, making falls from horseback particularly unforgiving. By June 1874, they were preparing for the arrival of Commissioner George A. French and the remaining divisions before departing for Fort Dufferin. The fort was then turned over once again to the Canadian Militia.

=== Federal penitentiary (1874–1877) ===
In 1871, Lower Fort Garry became Manitoba's provincial prison. The federal government assumed responsibility for the institution in 1874, and the fort subsequently served as a federal penitentiary. It housed prisoners serving sentences of more than two years, inmates from the federally administered North-West Territories, and military prisoners convicted of disciplinary offences.

Brick punishment cells were constructed at the fort in 1872. Archaeological investigations have identified four underground cells with arched brick ceilings, built using more than 14,000 bricks. According to the Manitoba Archaeological Society, these "penal cells" were used to punish recalcitrant prisoners and, after the fort became a temporary psychiatric hospital, to confine noisy patients.

The fort served as a federal penitentiary until 1877, when the Manitoba Penitentiary at Stony Mountain opened.

=== Temporary psychiatric hospital (1885–1886) ===
In 1885, Lower Fort Garry became the site of Manitoba's first provincial psychiatric facility while permanent buildings for the Manitoba Asylum for the Insane were under construction in nearby Selkirk. A doctor's office was built inside the fort, where Dr. David Young served as the first medical superintendent. The warehouse temporarily housed male patients, while the Men's House served as the women's ward.

The temporary hospital operated for about one year. When the Manitoba Asylum for the Insane opened in Selkirk on 25 May 1886, 59 patients were transferred from Lower Fort Garry to the new institution, together with Dr. Young and the first matron, Euphemia McBride.

=== Golf course and Motor Country Club (1913–1963) ===
In 1911, over eight decades after Lower Fort Garry was established in 1830, the Hudson's Bay Company ceased operations at the fort. Two years later, in 1913, the Winnipeg Automobile Club leased the property and established the Motor Country Club, which operated there for the next fifty years. The Big House became the club's dining and social centre, while a private nine-hole golf course was laid out on the surrounding grounds.

After nearly four decades as a country club, the Hudson's Bay Company donated Lower Fort Garry to the federal government in 1951. The Motor Country Club continued to lease the property until 1963, when Parks Canada began restoring the fort and its buildings for public interpretation as a National Historic Site.

=== Museum (1963–present) ===
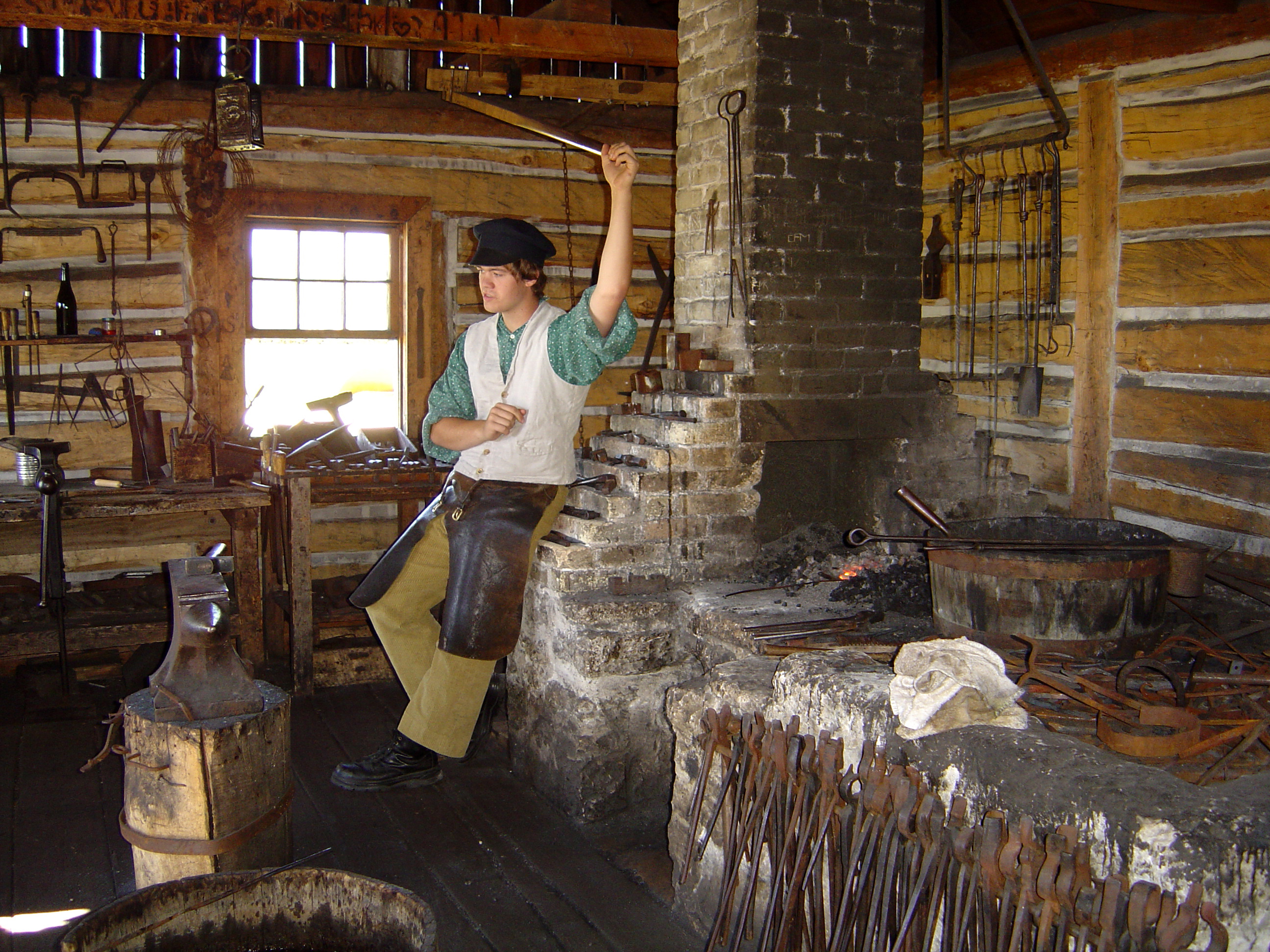
Between May and September, the Fort is used as a living museum, with re-enactors recreating life in the 1850s.

Lower Fort Garry is now administered by Parks Canada as a National Historic Site of Canada. During the operating season, the fort functions as a living museum, where costumed interpreters portray the people who lived and worked there during the early 1850s, when Eden Colvile was inland governor of the Hudson's Bay Company. Visitors can explore the fort's original buildings, view period furnishings and artifacts, and watch demonstrations of everyday work and skills from the period.

The site also includes museum exhibits and a Visitor Reception Centre. Its collection contains approximately 46,000 artifacts related to Lower Fort Garry, the fur trade, and the Red River Colony, many of which are displayed throughout the historic buildings and exhibition spaces.

== Recognition ==
Lower Fort Garry was designated a National Historic Site of Canada on 31 May 1950. In its Statement of Significance, the Historic Sites and Monuments Board of Canada described the fort as "one of the finest collections of early stone buildings in western Canada". The designation recognizes the site's importance as a Hudson's Bay Company supply depot and transportation centre, its later use as a federal penitentiary, and as the first training base of the North-West Mounted Police.

In 2011, Canada's History magazine named Lower Fort Garry one of Canada's ten best National Historic Sites, describing it as "the oldest intact stone fur trading post in North America".

== See also ==
- List of forts
