= Winnipeg Beach Provincial Park =

Provincial park in Manitoba, Canada

Coordinates: 50°30′01″N 96°58′13″W

Winnipeg Beach is a provincial park located on the west shore of Lake Winnipeg, Manitoba, and a popular swimming and cottage destination that began mainly in the early 1900s with train access to the area from Winnipeg. The small town of Winnipeg Beach once had a dance hall, roller coaster, luxurious hotel, and was the main destination for many when Winnipeg was one of the largest cities in Canada. Today the area is still popular, and was the main filming location for the TV series Falcon Beach.

== See also ==
- List of Manitoba parks
