= Matlock, Manitoba =

Coordinates: 50°26′02″N 96°57′50″W

Matlock, Manitoba is a community made up of both permanent residence and a large amount of cottage residence, that comprises the southernmost part of the Village of Dunnottar, Manitoba, Canada, on the southwestern shore of Lake Winnipeg. Along with the adjacent communities of Whytewold and Ponemah, Matlock forms the Village of Dunnotar. These Communities grew around the Canadian Pacific Railway. Exact population figures are difficult to measure, as the community maintains a small number of year-round residents but a much larger seasonal population during the summer months.

The community was named for Matlock, Derbyshire in England.
