= Rural Municipality of St. Andrews =

Rural municipality in Manitoba, Canada

St. Andrews
- Rural Municipality
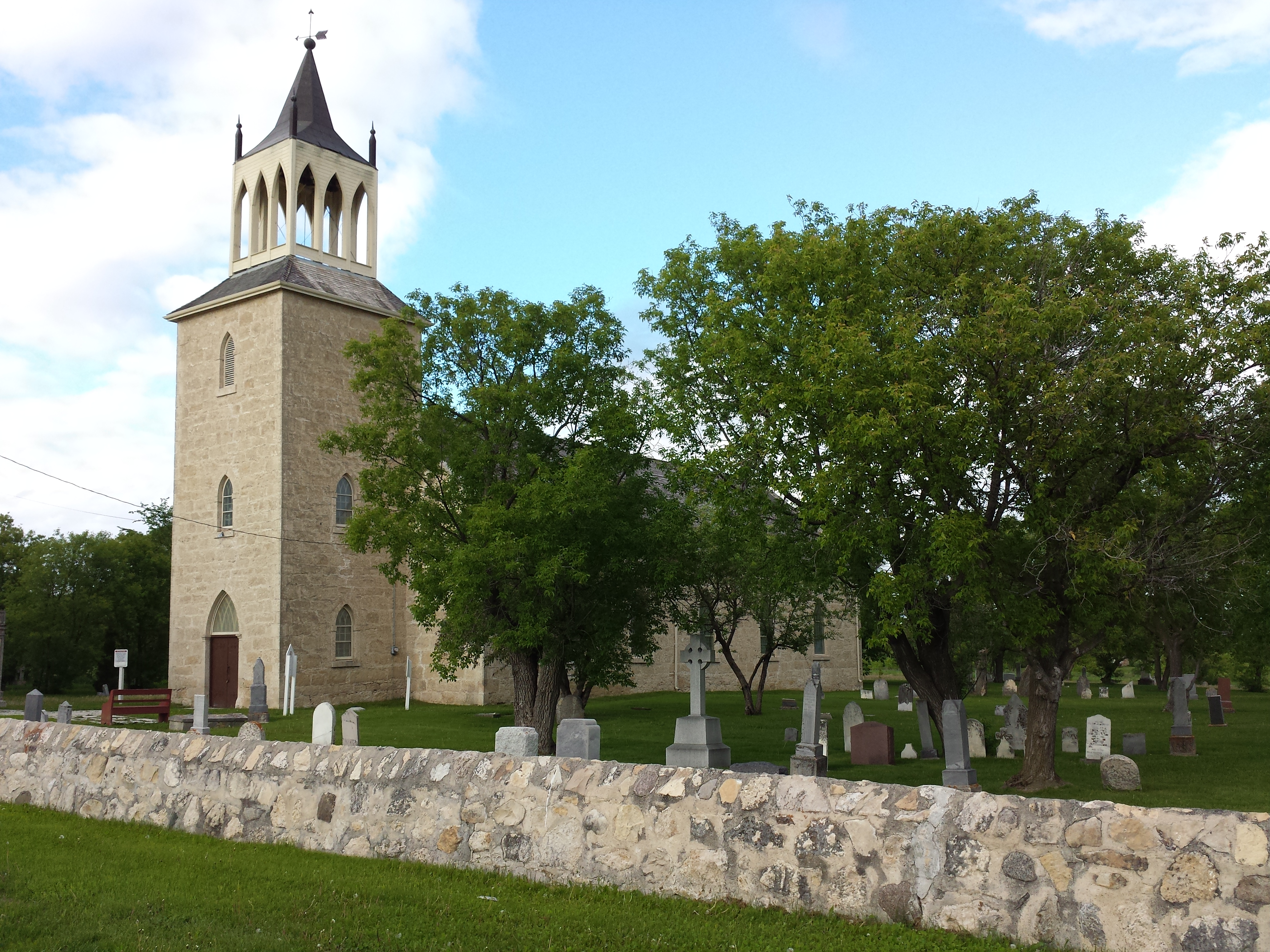
- St. Andrews Anglican Church

- Location of the RM of St. Andrews in Manitoba
- Coordinates: 50°16′12″N 96°58′29″W
- Country: Canada
- Province: Manitoba
- Region: Interlake and Winnipeg Metro
- Established: February 1880
- Seat: Clandeboye

Government
  - Mayor: Joy Sul

Area
  - Total: 752.22 km^{2} (290.43 sq mi)
- Elevation: 223 m (732 ft)

Population (2021)
  - Total: 11,723
  - Density: 15.585/km^{2} (40.364/sq mi)
- Time zone: UTC−6 (CST)
  - Summer (DST): UTC−5 (CDT)
- Postal Code: R0C 0P0
- Area codes: 204, 431
- Website: rmofstandrews.com

St. Andrews is a rural municipality (RM) in Manitoba, Canada. It lies west of the Red River; its southern border is approximately 8 kilometres (5.0 mi) north of Winnipeg.

The communities of Clandeboye, Petersfield, and Lockport (the part west of the Red River) are located in St. Andrews, which is part of Manitoba census division 13. The city of Selkirk, the town of Winnipeg Beach, and the village of Dunnottar are located adjacent to the municipality but are separate urban municipalities.

== History ==
Since the Red River was an important means of transportation in the early settlement and parish, much of St. Andrews' history can be seen along River Road. The parish of St. Andrews was situated between two major fur trading centres of the Hudson's Bay Company, Lower Fort Garry (near present-day Selkirk) and Upper Fort Garry (located in present-day Winnipeg).

The name St. Andrews was derived from the Anglican parish of St. Andrews, which existed for several decades prior to the formation of the municipality in February 1880.

St. Andrews Anglican Church is one of the most well-known historical sites in Manitoba. Built in 1849, it served a centre of Anglican missionary activity in Rupert's Land. It is the oldest surviving stone church in western Canada and was designated a national historic site in 1970. Its distinctive steeple and Gothic Revival architecture make it instantly recognizable and the building is used as symbol for both the community as well as the nearby St. Andrews elementary school.

Captain William Kennedy House is located along the Red River about 200 metres (660 ft) north of the St. Andrews church. Built in 1866 by Captain William Kennedy (1814–1890), it is now used as a museum and tea house. Its nearby flower garden is well known among locals and is commonly used for wedding photos. It was officially recognized as a provincial heritage site in 1984.

Twin Oaks and Miss Davis' School Residence was a girls school and boarding house built in the 1850s by the Red River Settlement and the Hudson's Bay Company. It became a National Historic site in 1962.

== Communities and localities ==
St. Andrews includes the following communities:

- Clandeboye
- Lockport (part)
- Mapleton
- Matlock
- Netley
- Petersfield
- South St. Andrews

Smaller communities include:

- Breezy Point
- Chalet Beach
- Cloverdale
- Less Crossing
- Little Britain
- McDonald
- Melnice
- Old England
- Parkdale
- Rossdale
- Sans Souci

== Demographics ==
Historical population
Year	Pop.	±%
1891	2,228	—
1981	7,990	+258.6%
1986	8,755	+9.6%
1996	10,144	+15.9%
2001	10,695	+5.4%
2006	11,359	+6.2%
2011	11,875	+4.5%
2016	11,913	+0.3%
2021	11,723	−1.6%
Sources: Department of Agriculture

In the 2021 Census of Population conducted by Statistics Canada, St. Andrews had a population of 11,723 living in 4,404 of its 4,736 total private dwellings, a change of −1.6% from its 2016 population of 11,913. With a land area of 739.61 km^{2} (285.57 sq mi), it had a population density of 15.9/km^{2} (41.1/sq mi) in 2021.

Panethnic groups in the Rural Municipality of St. Andrews (2001−2021)
Panethnic group	2021		2016		2011		2006		2001	
Panethnic group	Pop.	%	Pop.	%	Pop.	%	Pop.	%	Pop.	%
European (Note: Statistic includes all persons that did not make up part of a visible minority or an indigenous identity.)	9,510	82.34%	9,700	82.52%	10,150	86.46%	9,950	87.63%	9,820	91.86%
Indigenous	1,645	14.24%	1,760	14.97%	1,360	11.58%	1,240	10.92%	700	6.55%
Southeast Asian (Note: Statistic includes total responses of "Filipino" and "Southeast Asian" under visible minority section on census.)	170	1.47%	120	1.02%	45	0.38%	60	0.53%	35	0.33%
African	75	0.65%	75	0.64%	35	0.3%	25	0.22%	85	0.8%
South Asian	70	0.61%	25	0.21%	55	0.47%	20	0.18%	10	0.09%
Latin American	40	0.35%	10	0.09%	0	0%	10	0.09%	0	0%
East Asian (Note: Statistic includes total responses of "Chinese", "Korean", and "Japanese" under visible minority section on census.)	25	0.22%	45	0.38%	75	0.64%	15	0.13%	10	0.09%
Middle Eastern (Note: Statistic includes total responses of "West Asian" and "Arab" under visible minority section on census.)	0	0%	0	0%	0	0%	35	0.31%	35	0.33%
Other/multiracial (Note: Statistic includes total responses of "Visible minority, n.i.e." and "Multiple visible minorities" under visible minority section on census.)	10	0.09%	15	0.13%	0	0%	0	0%	0	0%
Total responses	11,550	98.52%	11,755	98.67%	11,740	98.86%	11,355	99.96%	10,690	99.95%
Total population	11,723	100%	11,913	100%	11,875	100%	11,359	100%	10,695	100%
Note: Totals greater than 100% due to multiple origin responses

== Attractions ==
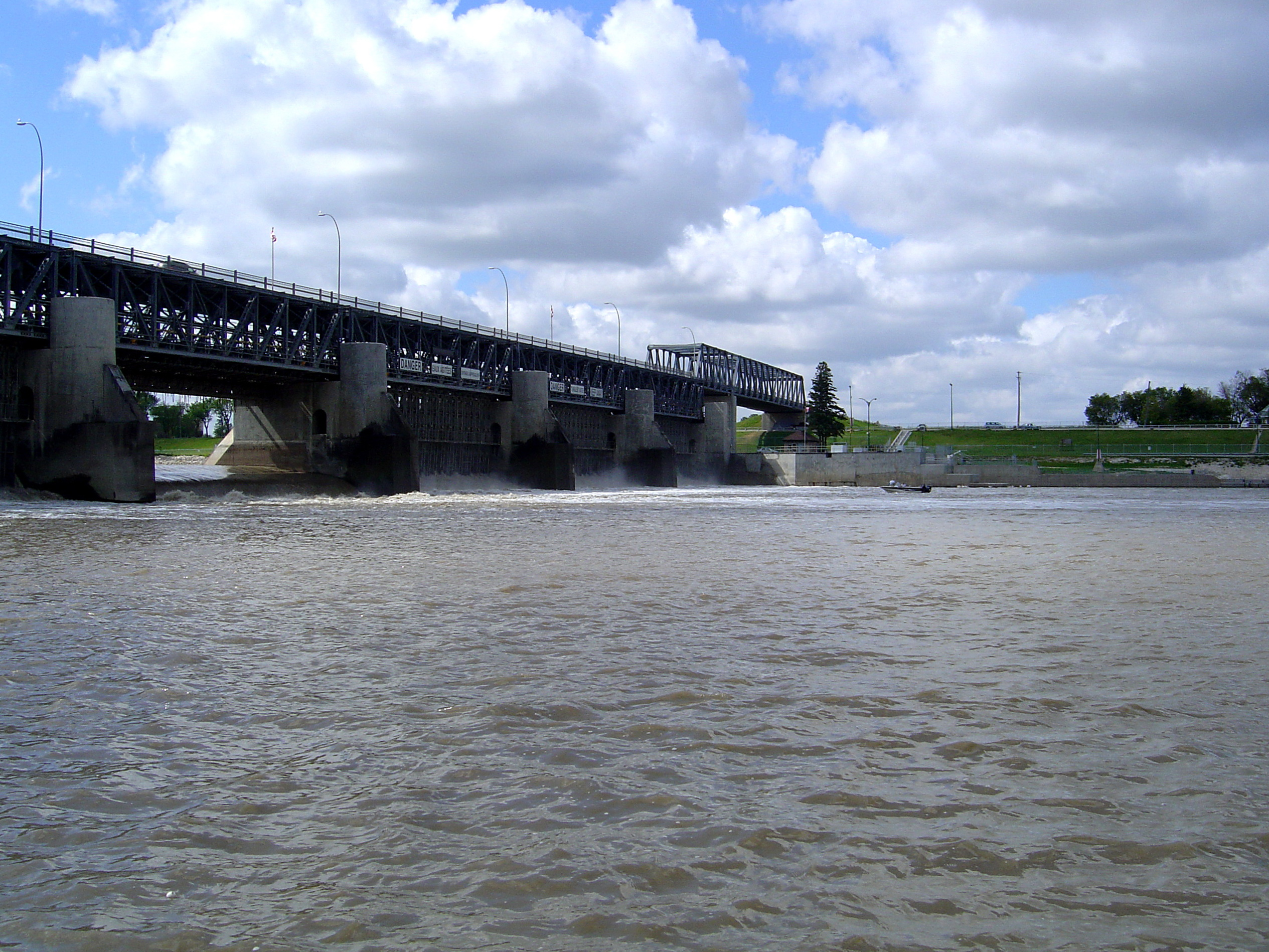
Lockport Lock and Dam in the RM of St. Andrews, Manitoba

In addition to the St. Andrews church, the municipality contains many historical and significant buildings and establishments, including:

- Captain William Kennedy House
- Little Britain United Church and Cemetery
- Lockport Provincial Park
- Lower Fort Garry National Historic Site
- Oak Hammock Marsh (partly)
- River Road Provincial Park
- St. Andrews Caméré Curtain Bridge Dam
- St. Andrews Rectory
- St. John's Cathedral Boys' School in Breezy Point
- Twin Oaks
- Winnipeg/St. Andrews Airport

These and several others have been officially recognized as national, provincial, or municipal historic sites. Other noteworthy establishments include the St. Andrews school, the municipal office, Larter's golf course, River Road Provincial Park, and Oak Hammock Marsh (a nature preserve which lies partly in St. Andrews).

St. Andrews Airport, which opened in 1962, provides an alternative to Winnipeg James Armstrong Richardson International Airport for smaller aircraft including many flying to remote First Nation communities. The privately owned and operated Selkirk Airport and Selkirk Water Aerodrome services smaller aircraft with landing facilities on both land and the nearby Red River for floatplanes.

Notable people born in St. Andrews include Darren Helm, a professional ice hockey player for the Detroit Red Wings of the National Hockey League.

== Water ==
Residents and businesses in the RM of St. Andrews get drinking water from private wells on their own land or purchase water from bulk water suppliers. Two underground carbonate aquifer wells located in the municipality supply part of the drinking water for the nearby City of Selkirk.

== Governance ==
St. Andrews is a municipal government, led by a mayor and six councillors. The municipal office for St. Andrews is located in Clandeboye.
