= Lockport, Manitoba =

Lockport
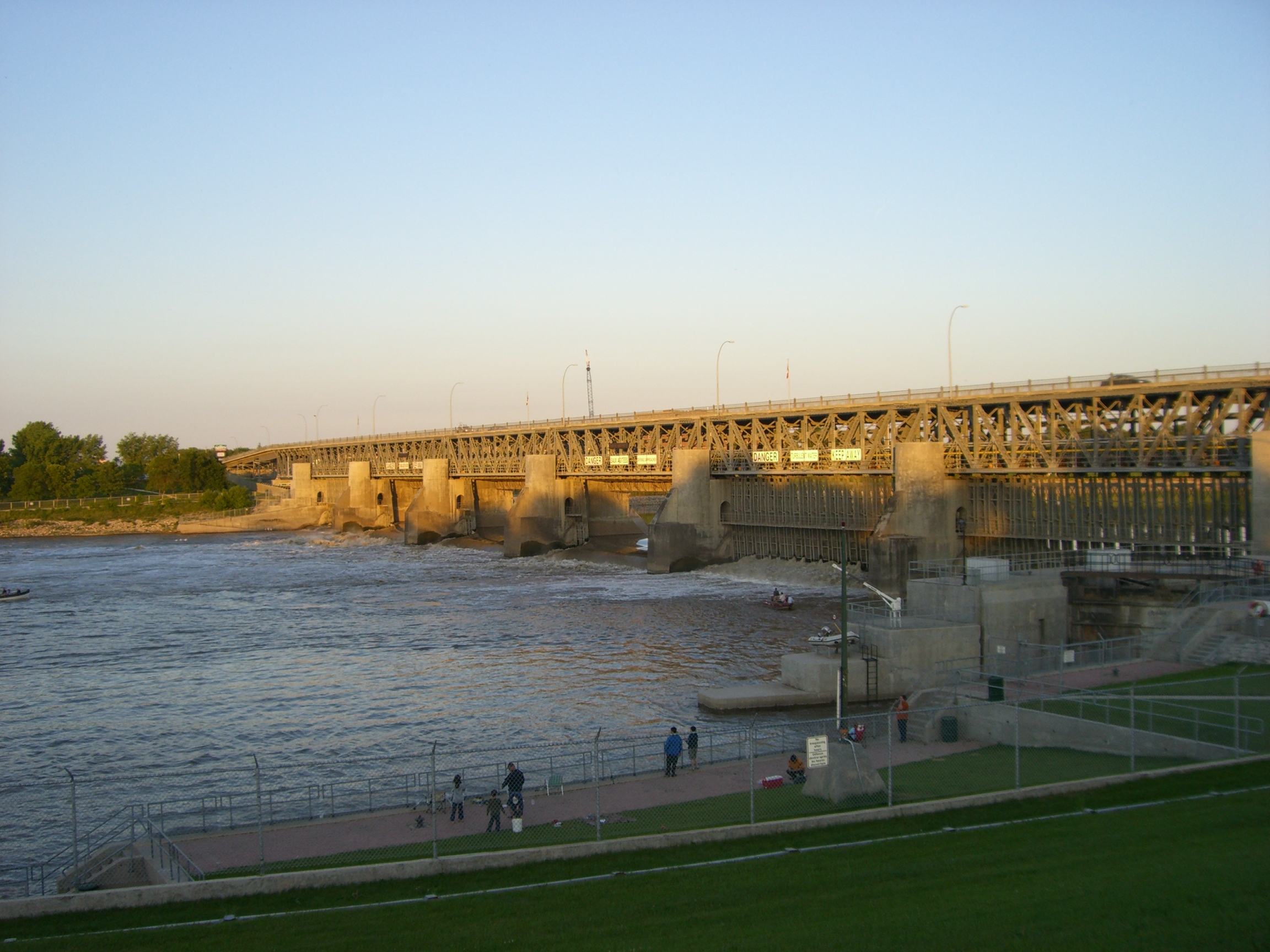
- St. Andrews Lock and Dam (north side)

- Location of Lockport in Manitoba
- Coordinates: 50°4′59″N 96°56′40″W
- Country: Canada
- Province: Manitoba
- Region: Winnipeg Capital Region
- Census Division: No. 13
- Rural Municipality: R.M. of St Andrews, R.M. of St Clements

Government
  - MP: James Bezan
  - MLA: Richard Perchotte

Area
  - Total: 2.48 km^{2} (0.96 sq mi)
- Elevation: 229 m (751 ft)

Population (2016)
  - Total: 458
  - Density: 185/km^{2} (478/sq mi)
- Time zone: UTC−6 (CST)
  - Summer (DST): UTC−5 (CDT)
- Forward sortation area: R1B
- Area codes: 204, 431
- NTS Map: 062I02
- GNBC Code: GAPDW

Lockport is a small unincorporated community in Manitoba, Canada. It is located 28 kilometres (17 mi) north of the city of Winnipeg along the Red River. The community is split between the Rural Municipalities of St. Andrews (west of the river) and St. Clements (east of the river).

The Red River Floodway rejoins the Red River just down river from Lockport. Lockport is also a popular angling location.

Lockport Provincial Park is located on the east bank of the river, where archeological studies have found evidence of human activity for 3,000 years.

== Demographics ==
In the 2021 Census of Population conducted by Statistics Canada, Lockport part A had a population of 445 living in 168 of its 175 total private dwellings, a change of −2.8% from its 2016 population of 458. With a land area of 2.47 km^{2} (0.95 sq mi), it had a population density of 180.2/km^{2} (466.6/sq mi) in 2021.

Also in the 2021 Census of Population, Lockport part B had a population of 301 living in 171 of its 176 total private dwellings, a change of 4.5% from its 2016 population of 288. With a land area of 0.44 km^{2} (0.17 sq mi), it had a population density of 684.1/km^{2} (1,771.8/sq mi) in 2021.

== St. Andrews Caméré Curtain Bridge Dam ==
The St. Andrews Caméré Curtain Bridge Dam, also known as the St. Andrews Lock and Dam, at Lockport was completed in 1910 in order to submerge the St. Andrews Rapids (a natural obstruction to the south) and make the Red River navigable through to Lake Winnipeg. The dam is 270 metres (886 ft) in length and the only Caméré curtain-style dam built in North America. Movable curtains are rolled back before winter freeze-up to prevent ice jams and allow flood waters to pass through unimpeded during the spring. A canal lock, the only one found in the Canadian prairies, allows river traffic to pass under the bridge.

The bridge above the dam, completed in 1913, connects Manitoba Highway 44 on either side of the river.

The St. Andrews Caméré Curtain Bridge Dam was designated a National Historic Site in 1990. A monument and recreation area are located on the west bank of the Red River near the dam.
