= River Road Provincial Park =

Provincial park in Manitoba, Canada

- IUCN category V (protected landscape/seascape)
- Location within Manitoba
- Location: Manitoba, Canada
- Nearest city: Winnipeg, Manitoba
- Coordinates: 50°3′20″N 96°59′14″W
- Area: .05 km^{2} (0.019 sq mi)
- Established: 1997
- Governing body: Government of Manitoba

River Road Provincial Park is a provincial park in the Canadian province of Manitoba, designated by the Government of Manitoba in 1997. The park is .05 square kilometres (0.019 sq mi) in size, and is considered to be a Class V protected area under the IUCN protected area management categories.

The park includes the Captain William Kennedy House, Miss Davis' School/Twin Oaks and the Scott House.

== See also ==
- List of protected areas of Manitoba
- River Road (St. Andrews, Manitoba)
- William Kennedy (explorer)
- List of National Historic Sites of Canada in Manitoba
- Red River of the North
- Red River Colony
