= Manitoba Highway 6 =

Provincial highway in Manitoba, Canada

Provincial Trunk Highway 6
- Northern Woods and Water Route (section)
- PTH 6 highlighted in red.

Route information
- Maintained by Manitoba Infrastructure
- Length: 738.6 km (458.9 mi)
- Existed: 1947–present

Major junctions
- South end: PTH 101 near Winnipeg
- PTH 67 at Warren; PTH 68 at Eriksdale; PTH 60 at Ponton; PTH 39 south of Grand Rapids
- North end: PR 391 at Thompson city limits

Location
- Country: Canada
- Province: Manitoba
- Rural municipalities: Coldwell; Grahamdale; Rockwood; Rosser; St. Laurent; West Interlake; Woodlands
- Major cities: Thompson
- Towns: Grand Rapids

Highway system
- Provincial highways in Manitoba; Winnipeg City Routes
← PTH 5	→ PTH 7

Provincial Trunk Highway 6 (PTH 6) is a provincial primary highway located in the Canadian province of Manitoba. It runs from the Perimeter Highway of Winnipeg to the Thompson south city limits. It is also the main highway connecting Winnipeg to northern Manitoba. The speed limit is 100 km/h. The route is also used to deliver nickel from the Thompson mine to the Royal Canadian Mint in Winnipeg. The section of highway between its southern terminus near Winnipeg and the second junction with PTH 68 near Eriksdale is part of the Northern Woods and Water Route. The portion of the highway between Ponton and Thompson was known as Highway 391 prior to 1986.

There have been talks of extending PTH 6 further north from Thompson to Churchill and the Nunavut border. If plans to make a highway in Nunavut connecting from Churchill, and Arviat, Nunavut to Chesterfield Inlet, Nunavut go through, then the first ever major road connection to Nunavut will be made.

== Route description ==
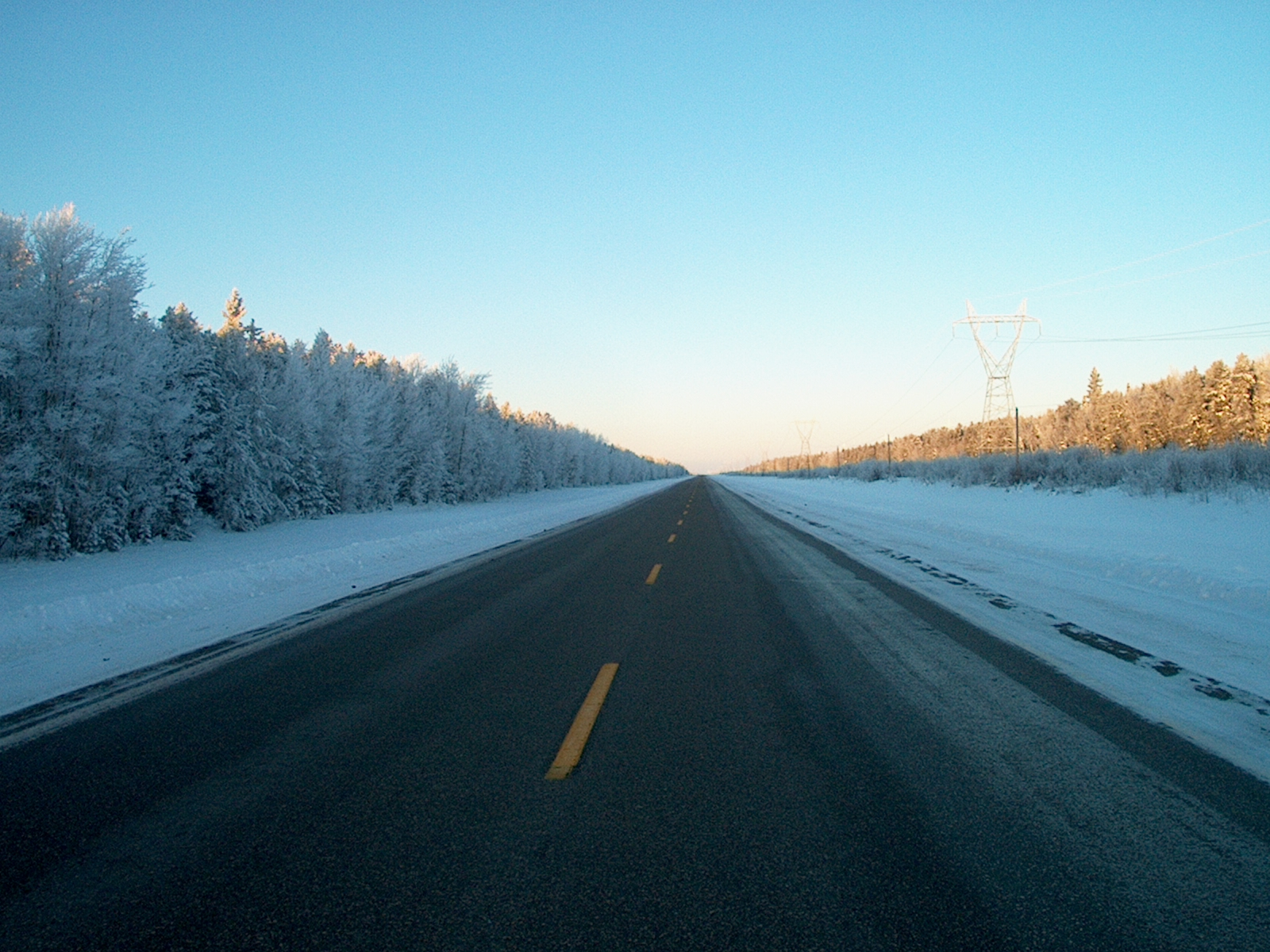
Manitoba Highway 6 between Grand Rapids and Ponton in Winter

PTH 6 begins in the Interlake Region on the outskirts of Winnipeg in the Rural Municipality of Rosser at an at-grade intersection with PTH 101, which also marks the beginning of the Northern Woods and Water Route, with the road continuing as Patterson Road. It heads west, concurrent (overlapped) with the Northern Woods and Water Route, to meet PR 236 at a Roundabout and cross the Prairie Dog Central Railway, where it curves northwest and begins paralleling the rail line as it goes through a switchback. The highway passes through the hamlets of Gordon and Grosse Isle, where it has intersections with PR 321 and PR 322 as well as briefly crossing into the Rural Municipality of Rockwood before entering the Rural Municipality of Woodlands.

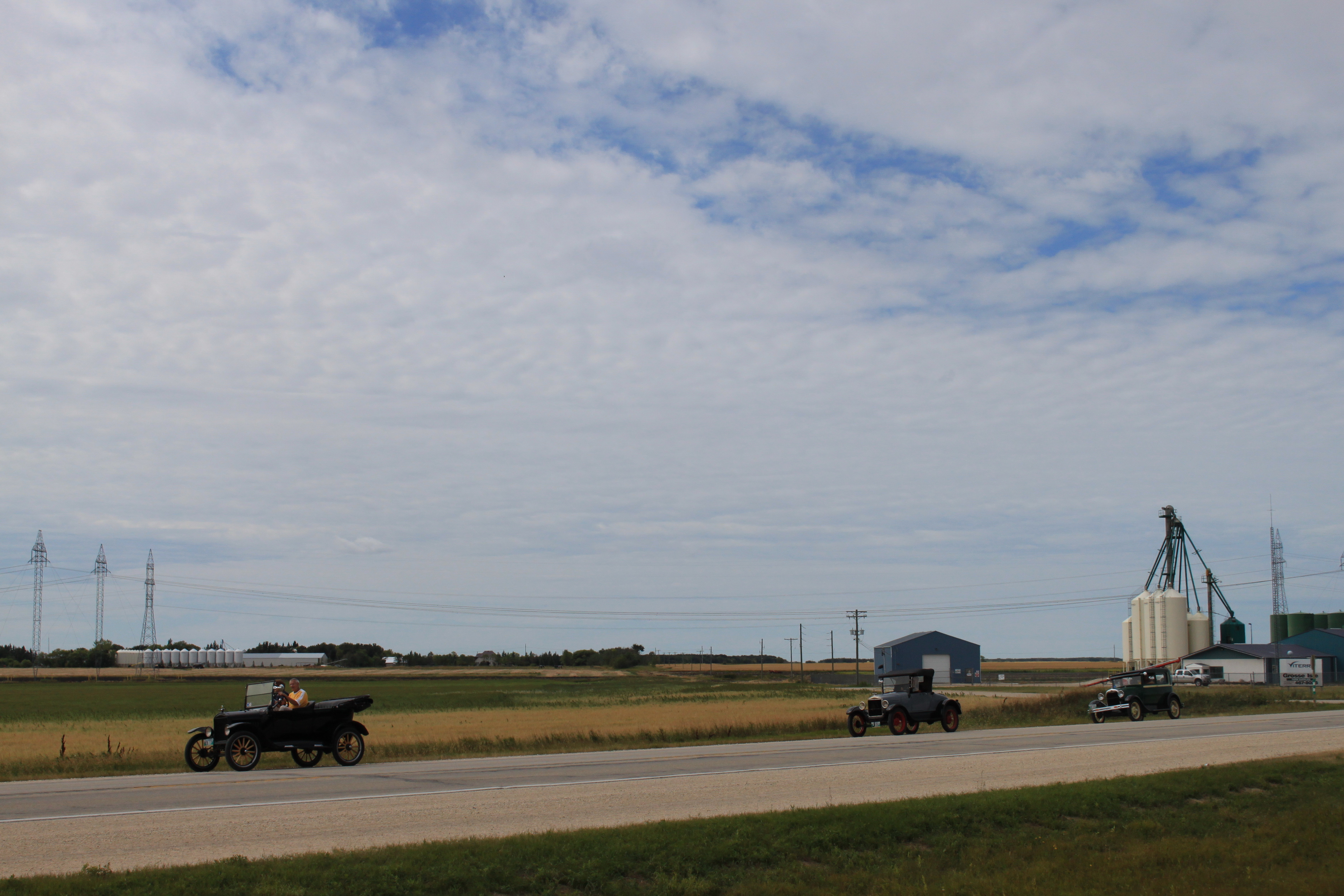
PTH 6 viewed from the Prairie Dog Central Railway in the Rural Municipality of Rosser

PTH 6 continues due northwest to have intersections with PTH 67 and PR 227 as it goes through a couple switchbacks along a bypass of Warren. The road previously passed directly through town along what is now Railway Avenue. The Prairie Dog Central Railway ends here and PTH 6 continues to have an intersection with PR 323 before traveling through the hamlet of Woodlands, where it has a junction with PR 518 at the northern end of town. The highway has intersections with PR 411 and PR 248 as it passes within 6 kilometres (3.7 mi) of the western shores of the Shoal Lakes before traveling through Lake Francis.

PTH 6 now enters the Rural Municipality of St. Laurent and has a junction with Twin Beach Road, which leads to Twin Lakes Beach (Twin Beaches), before traveling through the community of St. Laurent, where it begins paralleling the eastern coastline of Lake Manitoba and has an intersection with PR 415. The highway curves due northward at the community of Oak Point, leaving the lake's coastline and crossing into the Rural Municipality of Coldwell.

PTH 6 travels through a switchback at Clarkleigh, where it has an intersection with PR 229, before traveling through the town of Lundar, where it has an intersection with PR 419. The now enters the Rural Municipality of West Interlake and almost immediately passes through Deerhorn, where it curves due northwest again and to mostly bypass the town of Ericksdale within the next few kilometers, having an intersection with PR 417 and becoming concurrent with PTH 68 here. PTH 6 / PTH 68 begin traveling through more wooded areas (prior to this point, PTH 6 had been traveling through mostly agricultural areas), with PTH 68, along with the Northern Woods and Water Route, splitting off and heading west toward the Lake Manitoba Narrows after several kilometers, with PTH 6 continuing northwest to temporarily cross into the Rural Municipality of Grahamdale, traveling through the communities of Mulvihill and Camper before re-entering the Rural Municipality of West Interlake. PTH 6 travels through (though mostly bypasses) the town of Ashern, where it has a short concurrency with PR 325, and the town of Moosehorn, where it has a short concurrency with PR 237 (provides access to Watchorn Provincial Park). PTH 6 originally passed through Ashern along Railway Avenue. The highway goes through a large switchback as it bypasses the hamlet of Grahamdale, having an intersection with PR 239 (provides access to Steep Rock) at Steep Rock Junction shortly thereafter. It travels through the community of Hilbre as it comes within 3 kilometres (1.9 mi) of the southern shores of Lake St. Martin.

PTH 6 temporarily leaves the Rural Municipality of Grahamdale, traveling through the Pinaymootang First Nation and crossing the Fairford River at the Fairford River Water Control Structure (FRWCS / a dam), just a little 1 kilometre (0.62 mi) from its mouth on the northeast shore of Lake Manitoba. The highway re-enters the Rural Municipality of Grahamdale and leaves the proximity of Lake Manitoba for good, traveling past Lake Pineimuta and through the community of St. Martin Junction, where and it has an intersection with PR 513, before having junctions with PR 328 and Road 190 North (provides a second access road to Gypsumville).

PTH 6 leaves the Rural Municipality of Grahamdale and the Interlake Region behind to enter the Nor-Man Region and enter Division No. 21 as it travels through more remote areas for the next several kilometers, winding its way northward near the western shores of Lake Winnipeg to have a junction with PTH 60 (provides access to Lake Winnipegosis and Easterville). The highway enters the Misipawistik Cree Nation and has an intersection with Mannix Road (provides access to Grand Rapids Provincial Park) before traveling through the center of the community, crossing the Saskatchewan River via the Grand Rapids Bridge at its mouth on Lake Winnipeg into the town of Grand Rapids (and leaving the First Nation), coming within 2 kilometres (1.2 mi) of the Grand Rapids Dam (which impounds the Saskatchewan River to form Cedar Lake). PTH 6 crosses the northern part of town, having intersections with Grand Rapids Drive / Campbell Avenue (the town's Main Street) and Government Road (provides access to the dam and Hybord) before leaving Grand Rapids and the vicinity of Lake Winnipeg to cross into Division No. 22 after several kilometers remote terrain in the Boreal Forest of Canada.

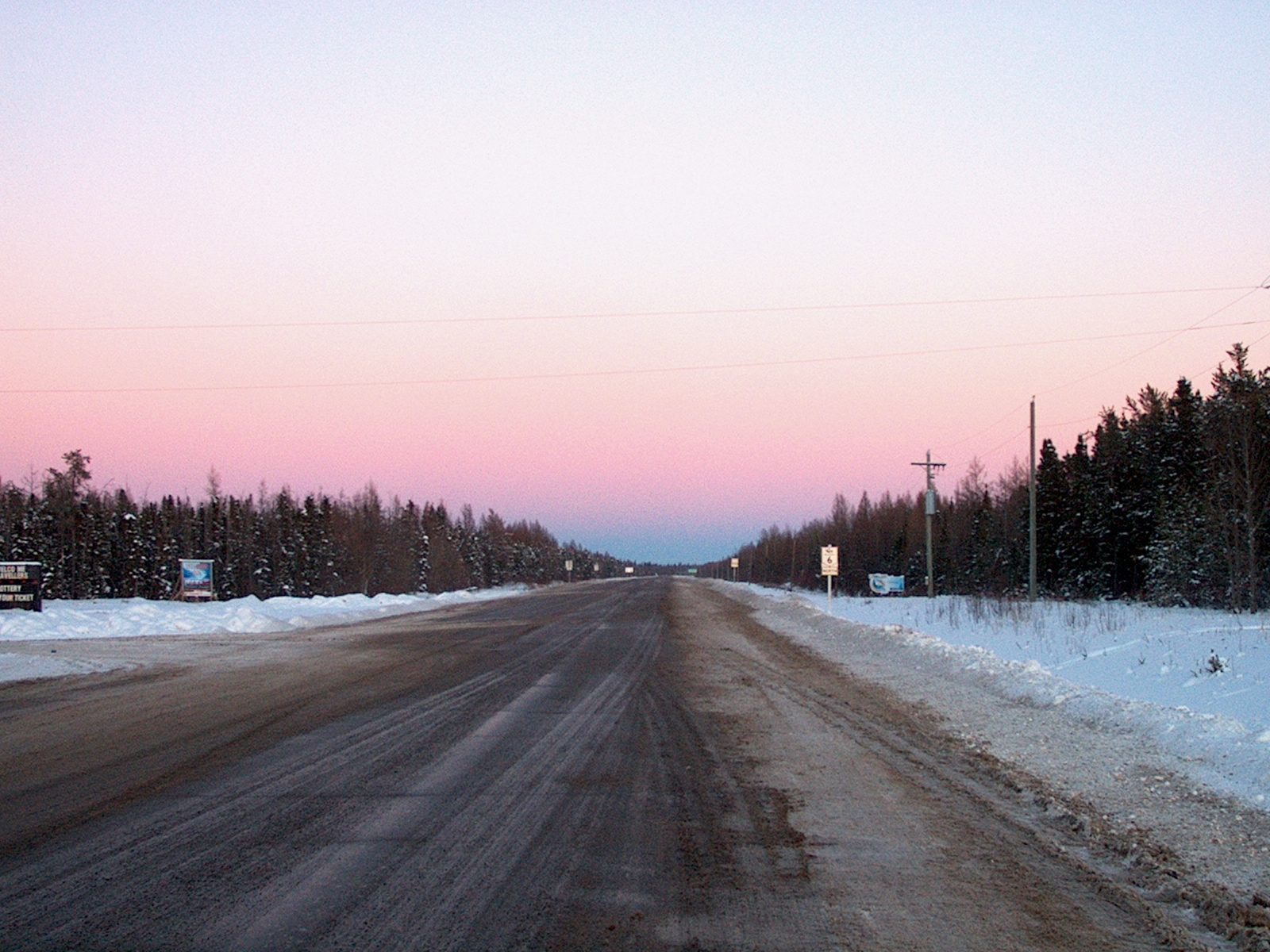
View of PTH 6 northbound (looking east) at the junction with PTH 39 in Ponton, during winter

The highway crosses the Hudson Bay Railway and has an intersection with PTH 39 at Ponton, where it makes a right at a stop sign and heads northeast alongside the railway for the next several kilometers. PTH 6 has an intersection with PR 373 as it passes along the eastern shores of Setting Lake, having an intersection with Fleming Drive, a short access road to the town of Wabowden, which lies only 2 kilometres (1.2 mi) off the highway. The road leaves Setting Lake and the railroad behind as it enters the Mystery Lake Local Government District and crosses the Grass River at Sasagiu Rapids Provincial Park. PTH 6 has an intersection with a short access road to Pisew Falls Provincial Park and the Rotary Suspension Bridge (Pisew Falls Road) before crossing Soab Creek. It has an intersection with PR 375, which provides access to Paint Lake Provincial Park and Paint Lake itslelf, as it winds its way northeast along the woodlands of the Canadian Boreal Forest, passing by several other lakes, such as Upper Ospwagan Lake and Ospwagan Lake. PTH 6 leaves the Mystery Lake Local Government District as it enters the Thompson, with the road widening to a four-lane divided highway and gaining the street name Mystery Lake Road, with the designation transitioning to PR 391 at the signalized intersection with Burntwood Road shortly thereafter.

With the exclusion of the short section of four-lane in Thompson, the entire length of Manitoba Provincial Trunk Highway 6 is a rural, two-lane highway.

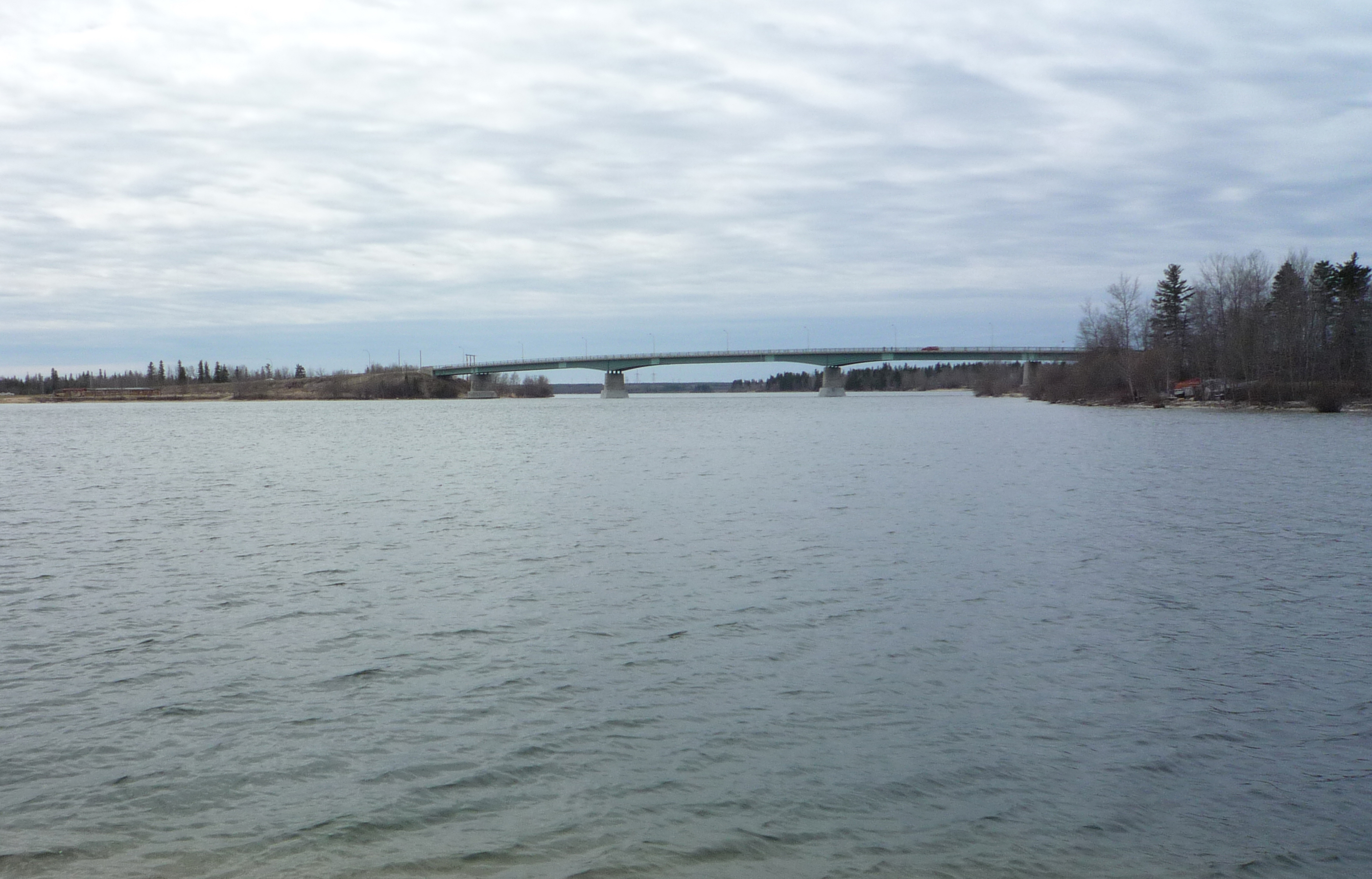
The Grand Rapids Bridge over the Saskatchewan River in Grand Rapids, part of PTH 6

== History ==
In 1928, PTH 6 was originally designated to travel from Minnedosa to the Saskatchewan border southwest of Benito via Dauphin and Swan River. In 1938–1939, the section east of Swan River became part of PTH 10. The remainder was redesignated as PTH 31 and PTH 49 in 1947, with PTH 6 being designated to its current route at that time.

When it was designated to its current route, PTH 6 travelled from Winnipeg as far as Gypsumville. The highway was extended from Gypsumville to Grand Rapids in 1964, followed by a further expansion to PR 391 at Ponton in 1972.

The last section of PTH 6 from Ponton to Thompson was designated in 1987, when the section of PR 391 between Thompson and PTH 10 was decommissioned. The section of the former PR 391 between Ponton and PTH 10 was redesignated as PTH 39.

The southern terminus of PTH 6 formerly extended into Winnipeg. Prior to 1966, PTH 6 began in Downtown Winnipeg at the intersection of Osborne Street and PTH 1 (Broadway), which was also the PTH 75 northern terminus. It followed Osborne Street, Memorial Boulevard, Colony Street, and Balmoral Street (present-day Winnipeg Route 62) north to Notre Dame Avenue. PTH 6 then headed northwest along Notre Dame Avenue (present-day Winnipeg Route 57), Keewatin Street, and Logan Avenue (present-day Winnipeg Route 47) to PTH 7 (present-day Winnipeg Route 90) near the Winnipeg International Airport. PTH 6 and PTH 7 share a common alignment north to the present-day location of PTH 101, where PTH 6 departed PTH 7. The combination of the establishment and Winnipeg Metro Routes and the opening of PTH 101, which took over a 6-kilometre (4 mi) section of PTH 6, resulting in the southern terminus being moved to its present-day location.

== Major intersections ==
Division	Location	km	mi	Destinations	Notes
City of Winnipeg		−22.5	−14.0	Memorial Boulevard (Route 62 south) Broadway (PTH 1)	Former PTH 6 southern terminus; former PTH 75 northern terminus; PTH 6 followed present-day Route 62
City of Winnipeg		−21.9	−13.6	Portage Avenue (Route 85)	Former PTH 4
City of Winnipeg		−20.4	−12.7	Notre Dame Avenue (Route 57) / Salter Street	PTH 6 turned onto Notre Dame Avenue
City of Winnipeg		−19.6	−12.2	Arlington Street	Former PTH 8 south; former south end of PTH 8 concurrency
City of Winnipeg		−19.3	−12.0	McPhillips Street (Route 180 north)	Former PTH 8 north; former north end of PTH 8 concurrency
City of Winnipeg		−16.6	−10.3	Logan Avenue (Route 47) / Keewatin Street	PTH 6 turned onto Logan Avenue
City of Winnipeg		−15.6	−9.7	King Edward Street (Route 90 south)	Former PTH 7 south; former south end of PTH 7 concurrency
Rosser		−5.8	−3.6	PTH 7 north – Stonewall Perimeter Highway (PTH 101 east)	PTH 6 formerly followed present-day PTH 101 west; former north end of PTH 7 concurrency; PTH 101 exit 60
Rosser		0.0	0.0	Perimeter Highway (PTH 101 south) / Paterson Road	PTH 6 southern terminus; Northern Woods and Water Route eastern terminus
Rosser		0.9	0.56	PR 236 north – Stonewall	Roundabout
Rosser		2.4	1.5	Road 67N – Rosser	Former PR 236 west
Rosser		8.1	5.0	Road 3 East	Former PR 334 south
Rosser	Grosse Isle	12.6	7.8	PR 322 north – Argyle	
Rosser–Rockwood line	Grosse Isle	13.8	8.6	PR 321 east – Stony Mountain	
Rockwood	No major junctions				
Woodlands	Warren	22.3	13.9	PTH 67 east – Stonewall	
Woodlands	Warren	24.1	15.0	PR 227 west – Westbourne	
Woodlands		33.0	20.5	PR 323 east – Argyle	
Woodlands	Woodlands	37.3	23.2	PR 518 north	
Woodlands		42.2	26.2	PR 411 west – St. Ambroise, St. Ambroise Provincial Park	
Woodlands		44.3	27.5	PR 248 south – Marquette, Elie	
Woodlands	Lake Francis	51.5	32.0	Road 88 North	Former PR 414 west
St. Laurent	St. Laurent	66.9	41.6	PR 415 east	
St. Laurent–Coldwell line	Oak Point	80.6	50.1	Oakdale Drive (511 Road)	Former PR 511 east
Coldwell	Clarkleigh	89.6	55.7	PR 229 east – Inwood	
Coldwell	Lundar	102.5	63.7	PR 419 – Lundar Beach, Chatfield	
West Interlake	Eriksdale	122.0	75.8	PTH 68 east / PR 417 west – Dog Creek Indian Reserve, Arborg	South end of PTH 68 concurrency
West Interlake		132.7	82.5	PTH 68 west (NWWR west) – The Narrows, Ste. Rose du Lac	North end of PTH 68 concurrency; former PR 235 west; Northern Woods and Water Route follows PTH 68 west
Grahamdale	No major junctions				
West Interlake	Ashern	161.2	100.2	PR 325 west – Ste. Rose du Lac	South end of PR 325 concurrency
West Interlake	Ashern	163.3	101.5	PR 325 east – Hodgson	North end of PR 325 concurrency
Grahamdale	Moosehorn	175.9	109.3	PR 237 west – Watchorn Provincial Park	South end of PR 237 concurrency
Grahamdale		177.7	110.4	PR 237 east Road 156N – Deighton Beach	North end of PR 237 concurrency
Grahamdale	Steep Rock Junction	193.3	120.1	PR 239 west – Steep Rock	
Pinaymootang First Nation		216.4	134.5	Crosses the Fairford River	
Grahamdale	St. Martin Junction	230.6	143.3	PR 513 east – Gypsumville, Dauphin River	
Grahamdale		233.5	145.1	PR 328 west – Waterhen	
Grahamdale		236.7	147.1	Road 190 North – Gypsumville	Former PR 513 east
No. 19		378.6	235.3	PTH 60 west – Easterville, The Pas, Flin Flon	Former PR 327 west
No. 21	No major junctions				
Town of Grand Rapids		411.0	255.4	Crosses the Saskatchewan River	
No. 21	Ponton	586.1	364.2	PTH 39 west – Snow Lake, Flin Flon, The Pas	Former PR 391 west
No. 22		615.8	382.6	PR 373 east – Jenpeg, Norway House, Cross Lake	
No. 22		632.6	393.1	Fleming Drive – Wabowden	
Mystery Lake		710.0	441.2	PR 375 east – Paint Lake Provincial Park	
City of Thompson		738.6	458.9	PR 391 north (Mystery Lake Road / Tom Cochrane's Life is a Highway) / Burntwood Road – Leaf Rapids, Lynn Lake	PTH 6 northern terminus; PR 391 southern terminus; continues as PR 391 north
1.000 mi = 1.609 km; 1.000 km = 0.621 mi: Closed/former; Concurrency terminus

== Related routes ==
=== Provincial Road 237 ===
Provincial Road 237
- Location: Watchorn Provincial Park - Moosehorn - Spearhill
- Length: 20.3 km (12.6 mi)
- Existed: 1966–present

Provincial Road 237 (PR 237) is a 20.3-kilometre-long (12.6 mi) east-west highway in the Rural Municipality of Grahamdale, connecting PTH 6 and the hamlet of Moosehorn with Watchorn Provincial Park and the hamlet Spearhill.

PR 237 begins along the coastline of northern Lake Manitoba in Watchorn Provincial Park, heading eastward through rural farmland for 3 kilometres (1.9 mi) before making a sharp left, heading north for around 1.5 kilometres (0.93 mi) before making a sharp right, continuing east for several more kilometres to enter Moosehorn. It passes through a neighbourhood before joining PTH 6 in a concurrency (overlap), following it for a couple kilometres as the two bypass downtown along its western side. PR 237 splits off and heads due east, leaving Moosehorn travelling through wooded areas for 5.5 kilometres (3.4 mi) before making a sharp left to enter Spearhill, where the PR 237 designation ends and the road continues north as Spearhill Road. With the exclusion of the PTH 6 concurrency, the entire length of PR 237 is an unpaved two-lane gravel road.

Division	Location	km	mi	Destinations	Notes
Grahamdale	Watchorn Provincial Park	0.0	0.0	Watchorn Provincial Park	Western terminus
Grahamdale	Moosehorn	11.3	7.0	PTH 6 south – Ashern; Government Road – Moosehorn	Western end of PTH 6 concurrency
Grahamdale		13.1	8.1	PTH 6 north – Grahamdale; Road 156N – Deighton Beach	Eastern end of PTH 6 concurrency
Grahamdale		13.9	8.6	Government Road – Moosehorn	
Grahamdale	Spearhill	20.3	12.6	Spearhill Road	Eastern terminus; road continues as Spearhill Road
1.000 mi = 1.609 km; 1.000 km = 0.621 mi: Concurrency terminus

=== Provincial Road 239 ===
Provincial Road 239
- Location: Steep Rock
- Length: 20.318 km (12.625 mi)
- Existed: 1966–present

Provincial Road 239 (PR 239) is a 20.318-kilometre-long (12.625 mi) east-west spur of PTH 6 in the Rural Municipality of Grahamdale, serving as the main road access to the town of Steep Rock, located on the northeastern shore of Lake Manitoba.

PR 239 begins at the eastern edge of Steep Rock at an intersection with Lakeshore Road, with the road continuing into town along Lakeview Drive. The highway winds its way southeast as it passes by a reservoir and a quarry before heading due eastward through rural areas for the next several kilometres. It travels through the small community of Faulkner before coming to an end at a junction with PTH 6 in the locality of Steep Rock Junction. The entire length of PR 239 is a paved two-lane highway.

Division	Location	km	mi	Destinations	Notes
Grahamdale	Steep Rock	0.000	0.000	Lakeview Drive – Steep Rock; Lakeshore Road – Steep Rock Beach	Western terminus; road continues as Lakeview Drive
Grahamdale	Steep Rock Junction	20.318	12.625	PTH 6 – Fairford, Grahamdale	Eastern terminus
1.000 mi = 1.609 km; 1.000 km = 0.621 mi

=== Provincial Road 375 ===
Provincial Road 375
- Location: Paint Lake Provincial Park
- Length: 6 km (3.7 mi)
- Existed: 1972–present

Provincial Road 375 (PR 375) is a short 6-kilometre-long (3.7 mi) east-west spur of PTH 6 in the Local Government District of Mystery Lake. It provides access to Paint Lake Provincial Park, as well as many summer camps and cabins surrounding the lake. The entire length of PR 375 is a paved two-lane highway.

Division	Location	km	mi	Destinations	Notes
Mystery Lake		0.0	0.0	PTH 6 – Wabowden, Thompson	Western terminus
Mystery Lake	Paint Lake Provincial Park	6	3.7	Paint Lake Provincial Park	Dead end; eastern terminus
1.000 mi = 1.609 km; 1.000 km = 0.621 mi

=== Provincial Road 411 ===
Provincial Road 411
- Location: St. Ambroise
- Length: 22.88 km (14.22 mi)
- Existed: 1966–present

Provincial Road 411 (PR 411) is a 22.88-kilometre-long (14.22 mi) east-west spur of PTH 6 (NWWR) in the Rural Municipalities of Portage la Prairie and Woodlands, connecting the highway to PR 430, the hamlet of St. Ambroise and St. Ambroise Beach Provincial Park. It is entirely a two-lane gravel road, traversing the southern coastline of Lake Francis for around half its length. No other settlements are along the highway.

Division	Location	km	mi	Destinations	Notes
Portage la Prairie	St. Ambroise	0.00	0.00	PR 430 – Poplar Point, St. Ambroise, St. Ambroise Beach Provincial Park	Western terminus
Woodlands		11.4	7.1	Road 18W – Lake Francis	Former PR 414
Woodlands		21.4	13.3	PR 248 – Lake Francis, Marquette	
Woodlands		22.88	14.22	PTH 6 (NWWR) – Woodlands, St. Laurent	Eastern terminus
1.000 mi = 1.609 km; 1.000 km = 0.621 mi

=== Provincial Road 417 ===
Provincial Road 417
- Location: Lake Manitoba First Nation–Eriksdale
- Length: 24.47 km (15.20 mi)
- Existed: 1966–present

Provincial Road 417 (PR 417) is a 24.47-kilometre-long (15.20 mi) east-west spur of PTH 6 in the Rural Municipality of West Interlake, running westward from its intersection with PTH 68 in Eriksdale to the Lake Manitoba First Nation on the shores of southern Lake Manitoba, having a junction with PR 418 along the way. The entire length of PR 417 is a paved two-lane highway.

Division	Location	km	mi	Destinations	Notes
West Interlake		0.00	0.00	Road 126N – Dog Creek	Lake Manitoba First Nation boundary; western terminus; road continues as Road 126N into First Nation
West Interlake		16.6	10.3	PR 418 south – Lundar Beach Provincial Park	Northern terminus of PR 418
West Interlake	Eriksdale	24.47	15.20	PTH 6 (NWWR) / PTH 68 west – Ashern, Lundar; PTH 68 east (Vimy Avenue) – Downtown, Poplarfield	Eastern terminus; road continues as PTH 68 east
1.000 mi = 1.609 km; 1.000 km = 0.621 mi

=== Provincial Road 513 ===
Provincial Road 513
- Location: St. Martin Junction–Dauphin River
- Length: 50.7 km (31.5 mi)
- Existed: 1966–present

Provincial Road 513 (PR 513) is a 50.7-kilometre-long (31.5 mi) east-west spur of PTH 6 in the Rural Municipality of Grahamdale and Unorganized Division No. 19, linking the highway with the First Nations of Little Saskatchewan, Lake St. Martin, and Dauphin River, as well as the hamlets of St. Martin, Gypsumville, and Dauphin River.

PR 513 begins in the Rural Municipality of Grahamdale in the community of St. Martin Junction at an intersection with PTH 6. It heads northeast through farmland for several kilometres, having an intersection with St. Martin Drive (which provides access to the hamlet of St. Martin) before entering Gypsumville. It winds its way through the centre of town, where it makes a sharp right beside of the Gypsumville School. The highway leaves Gypsumville and becomes unpaved, having a junction with Sandy Bay Road (which leads to Little Saskatchewan First Nation) before travelling near the northern coastline of Lake St. Martin, where it passes through the Lake St. Martin First Nation. PR 513 makes a sharp turn to the north and begins following the left bank of the Dauphin River, meandering through the remote woodlands of Unorganized Division No. 19 for several kilometres. The highway passes through the Dauphin River First Nation before entering the hamlet of Dauphin River, coming to a dead end on the coastline of Lake Winnipeg.

Division	Location	km	mi	Destinations	Notes
Grahamdale	St. Martin Junction	0.0	0.0	PTH 6 – Ashern, Grand Rapids	Western terminus
Grahamdale		3.9	2.4	St. Martin Drive – St. Martin	
Grahamdale	Gypsumville	10.4	6.5	Pavement ends	Northern end of paved section
Grahamdale		13.4	8.3	Sandy Bay Road – Little Saskatchewan First Nation	
No. 19	Dauphin River	50.7	31.5	Dead end at Lake Winnipeg	Eastern terminus
1.000 mi = 1.609 km; 1.000 km = 0.621 mi

=== Provincial Road 518 ===
Provincial Road 518
- Location: Woodlands
- Length: 23.299 km (14.477 mi)
- Existed: 1966–present

Provincial Road 518 (PR 518) is a 23.299-kilometre-long (14.477 mi) north–south spur of PTH 6 (Northern Woods and Water Route) in the Interlake Region. Located in the Rural Municipalities of Woodlands and St. Laurent, it connects the town of Woodlands with the western coastline of West Shoal Lake. It is entirely a two-lane gravel road, and includes a short Causeway over the lake.

Prior to 1992, PR 518 continued north via a short concurrency with PR 415 to travel along what is now known as Ideal Road, passing through the locality of Ideal and having an intersection with the former PR 511, before coming to an end at an intersection with PR 229. PR 518's original length was 40.1 kilometres (24.9 mi).

Division	Location	km	mi	Destinations	Notes
Woodlands	Woodlands	0.000	0.000	PTH 6 (NWWR) – Warren, Lake Francis	Southern terminus; road continues south as Road 9W
St. Laurent		17.8– 18.2	11.1– 11.3	Causeway over West Shoal Lake	
St. Laurent		23.299	14.477	PR 415 – St. Laurent, Teulon	Northern terminus; former PR 518 north
1.000 mi = 1.609 km; 1.000 km = 0.621 mi
