= Interlake-Gimli =

Provincial electoral district in Manitoba, Canada

Manitoba electoral district

Provincial electoral district
- Legislature: Legislative Assembly of Manitoba
MLA
Derek Johnson
Progressive Conservative
- District created: 2018
- First contested: 2019
- Last contested: 2023

Demographics
- Population (2019): 26,610
- Electors (2019): 16,065
- Area (km²): 16,520
- Pop. density (per km²): 1.6
- Census division(s): Division No. 18, Division No. 19
- Census subdivision(s): Arborg, Armstrong, Bifrost-Riverton, Coldwell, Division No. 18, Unorganized, East Part, Division No. 19, Unorganized, Dog Creek 46, Dunnottar, Fisher, Gimli, Grahamdale, St. Andrews, St. Laurent, Municipality of West Interlake, Winnipeg Beach

Interlake-Gimli (French: Entre-les-Lacs–Gimli) is a provincial electoral district in the Interlake region of Manitoba, Canada.

The riding was created by the 2018 provincial redistribution out of parts of Interlake, Gimli, Lakeside, and a small part of Swan River. The riding came into effect at the 2019 Manitoba general election.

True to its "Interlake" name, the riding runs between Lake Winnipeg in the east and Lake Manitoba in the west. Its southernmost point is located just south of Twin Lakes Beach, and its northernmost point is just north of Gypsumville.

== History ==
The current-day Interlake-Gimli constituency is the successor to the former riding of Interlake, which had been in effect since 1981.

Following the 2018 riding redistribution, its boundary expanded to include the now-defunct riding of Gimli (with the communities of Gimli, Winnipeg Beach, and Riverton), thereby changing its name from "Interlake" to "Interlake-Gimli". This new constituency came into effect at the 2019 Manitoba general election.

The Interlake riding was an NDP stronghold from 1981 until the 2016 provincial election, when incumbent Progressive Conservative Derek Johnson was voted in, being re-elected in 2019 and 2023.

Gimli, on the other hand, which had existed since 1899, has been held by different parties over its history. Prior to being absorbed in the new riding in 2018, Gimli elected PC MLA Ed Helwer for 15 years, from 1988 to 2003; followed by an NDP candidate in 2007 and 2011; and lastly, a PC candidate in 2016, Jeff Wharton, who is now the incumbent MLA for Red River North, which was also created in 2018.

== Communities and location ==
The riding is located in the Interlake Region of Manitoba. True to that name, the riding runs between Lake Winnipeg in the east and Lake Manitoba in the west. Its southernmost point is located just south of Twin Lakes Beach, and its northernmost point is just north of Gypsumville.

The riding includes Census Division No. 18, and parts of Division No. 19.

Communities in the riding include Arborg, Ashern, Bifrost-Riverton, Dog Creek 46, Dunnottar, Gimli, Gypsumville, Oak Point, Riverton, and Winnipeg Beach, as well as the Rural Municipalities of Armstrong, Coldwell, Fisher, Gimli, Grahamdale, St. Andrews, St. Laurent, and West Interlake.

== Demographics ==
As of the 2021 census, Interlake-Gimli's population is 26,610, a 13.4% change from its population of 23,460 in 2016.

A quarter of the constituency's residents are 65 and older. The median age of the riding is 48.8, over ten years older than the overall provincial median of 38.4.

Nearly 28% of residents identified as Indigenous, with 3% identifying as visible minorities. Its population is composed of 97.7% Canadian citizens, with less than 7% residents being immigrants.

Amenities:

- Multiple dwellings: 92
- Hospitals: 4
- Personal care homes: 6
- Schools: 27
- Post-secondary institutions: 0
- Correctional facilities: 0

== Election results ==
=== 2023 ===
2023 Manitoba general election
Party	Candidate	Votes	%	±%	Expenditures
Progressive Conservative	Derek Johnson	5,143	49.59	-9.03	$40,272.35
New Democratic	Sarah Pinsent-Bardarson	4,460	43.01	+9.94	$50,266.72
Keystone	Larry Brandt	393	3.79	–	$4,816.90
Liberal	Sean James	374	3.61	-0.20	$1,617.68
Total valid votes/expense limit		10,370	99.24	–	$63,090.00
Total rejected and declined ballots		79	0.76	–	
Turnout		10,449	65.04	-0.52	
Eligible voters		16,065			
Progressive Conservative hold		Swing		-9.48	
Source(s) Source: Elections Manitoba

=== 2019 ===
2019 Manitoba general election
Party	Candidate	Votes	%	±%	Expenditures
Progressive Conservative	Derek Johnson	6,165	58.62	-1.8	$33,875.10
New Democratic	Sarah Pinsent	3,478	33.07	+8.5	$34,329.54
Green	Dwight Harfield	473	4.50	+1.5	$0.00
Liberal	Mary Lou Bourgeois	400	3.80	-7.3	$0.00
Total valid votes		10,516	–		
Rejected		39	–		
Eligible voters / turnout		16,100	65.56		
Source(s) Source: Manitoba. Chief Electoral Officer (2019). Statement of Votes for the 42nd Provincial General Election, September 10, 2019 (PDF) (Report). Winnipeg: Elections Manitoba. "Candidate Election Returns". Elections Manitoba. Elections Manitoba.

2016 provincial election redistributed results
Party	%
Progressive Conservative	60.8
New Democratic	24.6
Liberal	11.1
Green	3.0
Manitoba	0.6

== See also ==
- List of Manitoba provincial electoral districts
- Canadian provincial electoral districts
