= Interlake Reserves Tribal Council =

Tribal council in Manitoba

- Headquarters: Fairford, Manitoba, Canada
- Chair: Cornell McLean
- Website: irtc.ca

The Interlake Reserves Tribal Council (IRTC) is a tribal council in the Interlake Region of Manitoba, Canada, representing seven First Nations communities.

== Members ==
The IRTC represents seven First Nations communities in the Interlake Region:

- Dauphin River First Nation — Gypsumville
- Kinonjeoshtegon First Nation — Dallas
- Lake Manitoba — Lake Manitoba
- Little Saskatchewan First Nation — Gypsumville
- Peguis First Nation — Peguis Reserve
- Pinaymootang First Nation — Fairford
