= Division No. 19, Manitoba =

Census division in Canada

Coordinates: 51°50′N 98°00′W

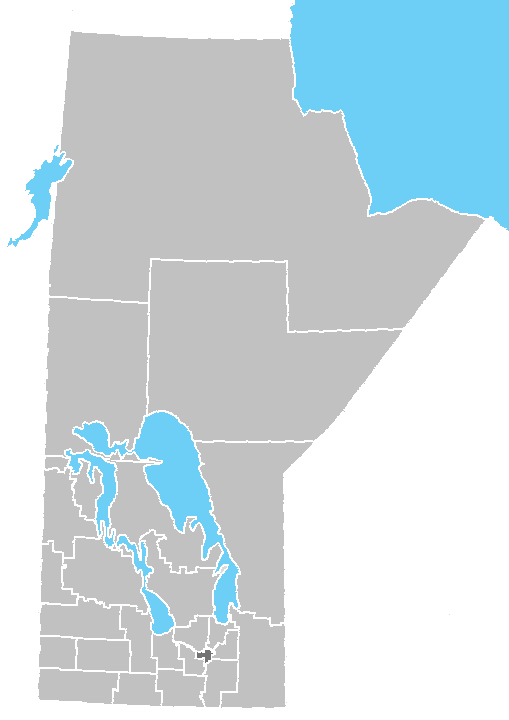

Division No. 19, also informally known as North East Manitoba, is a census division within the Province of Manitoba, Canada. Unlike in some other provinces, census divisions do not reflect the organization of local government in Manitoba. These areas exist solely for the purposes of statistical analysis and presentation; they have no government of their own.

Division No. 19 actually extends all the way across the province from west to east at near its middle, although the overwhelming majority of its territory is located in its eastern and southeastern portions. It includes most of Lake Winnipeg, most of Lake Winnipegosis, and some of the north basin of Lake Manitoba. The Northern Region of Manitoba begins at the 53rd Parallel is known as Norman region denoting the start of Northern Manitoba.

The division had a population of 14,725 in 1996. The division had a population of 15,805 in the Canada 2001 Census.

== Demographics ==
In the 2021 Census of Population conducted by Statistics Canada, Division No. 19 had a population of 15,381 living in 4,825 of its 7,625 total private dwellings, a change of −6.2% from its 2016 population of 16,399. With a land area of 60,536.43 km^{2} (23,373.25 sq mi), it had a population density of 0.3/km^{2} (0.7/sq mi) in 2021.

== Unincorporated communities ==
- Berens River
- Dauphin River
- Little Grand Rapids
- Pine Creek

== First Nations Reserves ==
- Berens River 13
- Black River 9
- Bloodvein 12
- Chemawawin 3
- Crane River 51
- Dauphin River 48A
- Fairfield 50 (part)
- Fisher River 44 & 44A
- Fort Alexander 3
- Hollow Water 10
- Jackhead 43
- Little Grand Rapids 14
- The Narrows 49
- Misipawistik Cree Nation (Masikiskahk Indian Reserve)
- Pauingassi First Nation
- Peguis 1B
- Pine Creek 66A
- Poplar River 16
- Shoal River 65A
- Swan Lake 65C
- Waterhen 45

== Unorganized areas ==
- Unorganized Division No. 19
