= Dauphin River (disambiguation) =

Dauphin River may refer to:

- Dauphin River, a river of Manitoba, Canada
- Dauphin River (Saint Lucia), a river of Saint Lucia
- Dauphin River, Manitoba, a community in the Canadian province of Manitoba
- Dauphin River First Nation, a First Nation in Manitoba

== See also ==
- Dauphin (disambiguation)
