= Treaty 2 =

Treaty between First Nations and Canadian Crown

Treaty 2 was entered in to on 21 August 1872 at Manitoba House, Rupertsland, with representatives of the Queen of Great Britain and Ireland. The original Anishinaabe (Chippewa and Cree), who were present, constitute Treaty 2 today. It is known that many of the chiefs and leaders within the territory were at the early gathering and after the treaty was agreed to. Those who were not present were represented through Mekis (the Eagle) until they indicated where they wished their farming reserves to be established. The treaty reaffirmed the inherent rights that the Anishinaabe had prior to European contact, located where southwestern Manitoba is today and a small part of southeastern Saskatchewan.

== History ==
This was the second treaty made since the formation of the modern Canadian government in 1867, and one year after the province Manitoba joined the Canadian Confederation. Manitoba was not a province located in Treaty 2 at the time the treaty was made. The Manitoba Act was amended in 1872 to accommodate Treaty 1.

The purpose of Treaty 2 21 August 1871 "….to open up to settlement and immigration a tract of country bounded and described hereinafter mentioned, and to obtain the consent thereto of her Indian subjects inhabiting the said tract, and to make treaty and arrangements with them, so that there be peace and good will…"

It was also known as the "Manitoba Post Treaty," named after the fur trading post of the Hudson's Bay Company where the treaty was signed. Manitoba Post was located on the northwest shore of Lake Manitoba. The terms of this treaty were similar to that of Treaty 1.

Treaty 1 and Treaty 2 were amended by an Order in Council on 30 April 1875, to add provisions which were originally promised verbally by the government. Similar "outside promises" were included in the text of 1873's Treaty 3, adding further pressure on the government to include such provisions in the earlier treaties.

Treaty 2 itself notes that there were several communities who were not represented at Manitoba House, and in the Treaty, it provides that Mekis, a son of Okanese, would represent those communities in the Treaty 2 process.

=== The Treaty 2 territory ===
The Anishinaabe/Chippawa territory is much larger and extends beyond the current territory of Treaty 2. Today going by the original text during the making of Treaty 2 extends north of Treaty No.1 territory, along the east shore of Lake Winnipeg to Berens River, across to the Dauphin River along the waterways up to the northern tip of Waterhen Lake, across the Winnipegosis north of Duck Bay (old Duck Bay Reserve), then to the source of the Shell River in Duck Mountains along the Assiniboine to the Moose Mountains in southeastern Saskatchewan across the international border up by Brandon then to white mud river across over to the Drunken River, then to Winnipeg River where it started.

The territory includes 8,676,828 hectares of land (21,440,909 acres). Included within the territory are many mountains, rivers, and lakes which include; Riding Mountain National Park, Duck Mountain Provincial Park, Turtle Mountain Provincial Park, Hecla/ Grindstone Provincial Park, and Moose Mountain Provincial Park Saskatchewan, and many lakes such as Dauphin Lake, Clear Lake, Childs Lake, south basin of Lake Winnipegosis and Lake Winnipeg and north basin of Lake Manitoba. Today's largest city located in Treaty 2 is Brandon, then Dauphin. There are many towns and RMs located within the territory today.

=== List of Treaty 2 First Nations ===
- Dauphin River First Nation
- Ebb and Flow First Nation
- Keeseekoowenin Ojibway First Nation (Dauphin Lake/Riding Mountain)
- Lake Manitoba First Nation (Dog Creek)
- Lake St. Martin First Nation
- Little Saskatchewan First Nation
- O-Chi-Chak-Ko-Sipi First Nation (Crane River)
- Pinaymootang First Nation (Fairford)
- Skownan First Nation (formerly Waterhen First Nation)

== See also ==
- Numbered Treaties
- The Canadian Crown and Aboriginal peoples
