= Watchorn Provincial Park =

Provincial park in Manitoba

- IUCN category III (natural monument or feature)
- Location within Manitoba
- Interactive map of Watchorn Provincial Park
- Location: Manitoba, Canada
- Nearest town: Moosehorn
- Coordinates: 51°16′42″N 98°33′42″W
- Area: 10.78 ha (26.6 acres)
- Established: 1961
- Governing body: Government of Manitoba

Watchorn Provincial Park is located in Interlake Region of Manitoba, Canada on the eastern shore of Lake Manitoba. The park lies within the Rural Municipality of Grahamdale, 12 km (7 mi) west of Moosehorn and 210 km (130 mi) northwest of Winnipeg. The park is 10.78 ha (26.6 acres) in size and was established in 1961.

== See also ==
- List of protected areas of Manitoba
