= Unorganized West Division No. 18, Manitoba =

Unorganized area in Manitoba, Canada

Unorganized West Division No. 18 is an unorganized area in central Manitoba, consisting of two non-contiguous areas. It includes the islands within Lake Manitoba and Lake St. Martin in Division No. 18 that are not a part of an organized municipality or First Nation. It has an area of 15.25 km^{2} and a recorded population of 0 (as of 2016).

Southern portion

Northern portion
