= Division No. 18, Manitoba =

Census division in Canada

Coordinates: 51°02′N 97°34′W

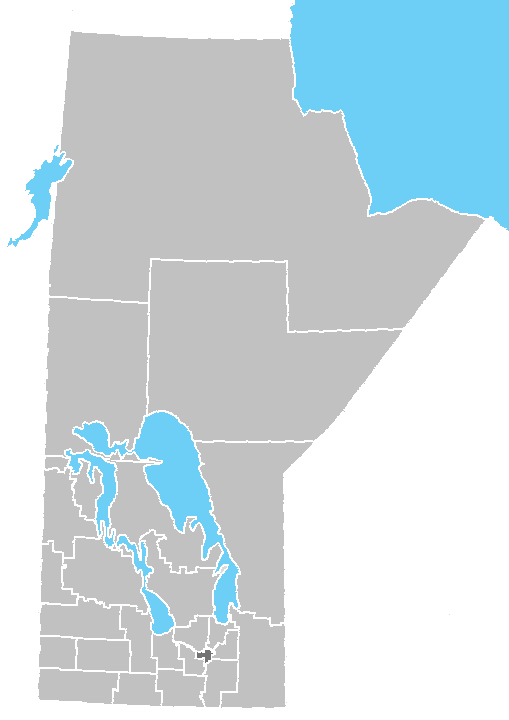

Census Division No. 18 (North Interlake) is a census division located within the Interlake Region of the province of Manitoba, Canada. Unlike in some other provinces, census divisions do not reflect the organization of local government in Manitoba. These areas exist solely for the purposes of statistical analysis and presentation; they have no government of their own.

The economy of the region is based on agriculture, livestock and manufacturing. The population of the area as of the 2006 census was 23,861. The division contains all of the south basin of Lake Manitoba, and borders the west shore of the north basin (which is part of Division No. 19). It also contains Hecla-Grindstone Provincial Park at its northeast corner. Also included in the division are the main reserves of the Lake Manitoba First Nation (Dog Creek 46), the Little Saskatchewan First Nation, and the Pinaymootang First Nation (Fairford 50).

== Demographics ==
In the 2021 Census of Population conducted by Statistics Canada, Division No. 18 had a population of 26,636 living in 11,025 of its 16,310 total private dwellings, a change of 10.3% from its 2016 population of 24,155. With a land area of 11,362.44 km^{2} (4,387.06 sq mi), it had a population density of 2.3/km^{2} (6.1/sq mi) in 2021.

== Towns ==
- Arborg
- Winnipeg Beach

== Unincorporated communities ==
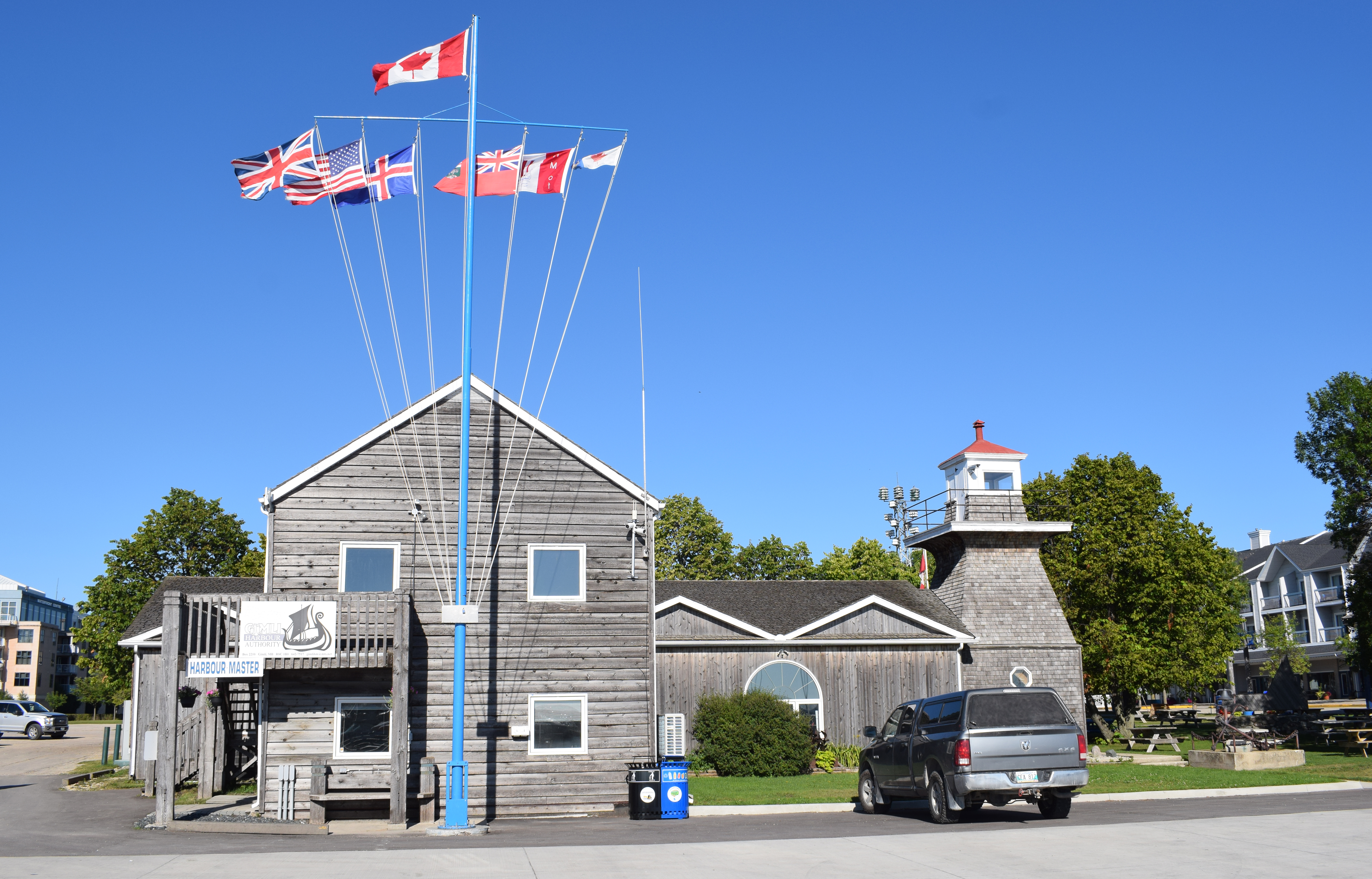
Gimli Harbour Master's building in Gimli

- Gimli
- Riverton

== Municipalities ==
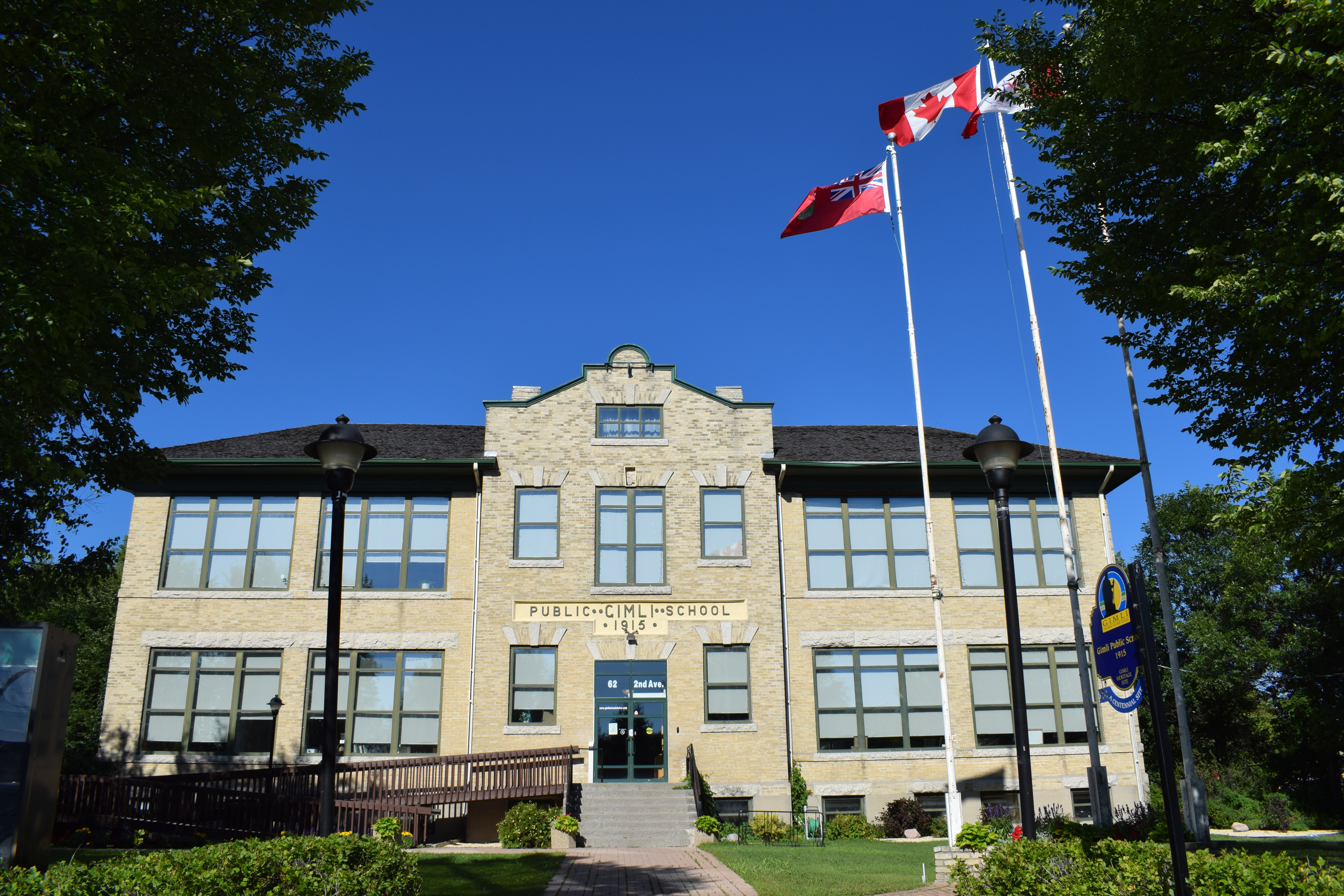
Gimli Public School Building in the Rural Municipality of Gimli, now site of the rural municipality's offices

- Armstrong
- Bifrost – Riverton
- Coldwell
- Fisher
- Gimli
- Grahamdale
- St. Laurent
- West Interlake

== Reserves ==
- Dog Creek 46
- Fairfield 50 (part)
- Little Saskatchewan 48
