= St. Laurent, Manitoba =

St. Laurent
- Location of St. Laurent in Manitoba St. Laurent (Canada)
- Coordinates: 50°24′46″N 97°56′27″W
- Country: Canada
- Province: Manitoba
- Region: Interlake
- Census Division: No. 18

Government
  - Governing Body: Rural Municipality of St. Laurent Council
  - MP: James Bezan
  - MLA: Derek Johnson

Area
  - Total: 465.62 km^{2} (179.78 sq mi)

Population
  - Total: 1,338
  - Density: 2.8/km^{2} (7.3/sq mi)
- Time zone: UTC−06:00 (CST)
  - Summer (DST): UTC−05:00 (CDT)
- Postal Code: R0C 2S0
- Area code: 204
- NTS Map: 062I05
- GNBC Code: GAXYM

St. Laurent (French: Saint-Laurent) is a community on the eastern shore of Lake Manitoba. It lies within the boundaries of the Rural Municipality of St. Laurent, 70 km (43 mi) from Winnipeg. A historically-Métis settlement, St. Laurent is one of the few remaining places in which the Michif French language is still spoken.

== History ==
Prior to the arrival of European colonists, the area between Lake Manitoba and Lake Winnipeg was contested among the Ojibwa, Cree, and Sioux peoples for much of the 18th century, with the Ojibwa ultimately achieving dominance. In the 1730s, La Vérendrye was the first European to systematically explore the territory. By the early 19th century, the interlake region of Manitoba was inhabited by Ojibwa Saulteaux, but it is unclear if any of the groups lived in the immediate vicinity of St. Laurent when it was founded.

St. Laurent was established as Fond du Lac in 1824 by Métis leaving Pembina, North Dakota. Pembina, located in Rupert's Land, had been recently ceded by Great Britain to the United States via the Treaty of 1818, prompting the departure of the Métis there. More settlers arrived in 1826 as a result of flooding of the Red River of the North, with further growth driven by Métis in search of land and traders seeking to take advantage of trade routes to the northwest. The economy centred around fishing and the fur trade, with settlers serving as intermediaries with Cree and Assiniboine people.

Sometime after its establishment as a parish in 1858, the community was renamed St. Laurent, either after a Catholic priest who established the permanent mission there or after the martyr St. Lawrence. Additional Métis settlers moved to St. Laurent in the aftermath of the Red River Rebellion ending in 1870. The broader area was formally incorporated as the Rural Municipality of St. Laurent in 1882. In 1891, the St. Laurent subdistrict had a population of 1697. French-Canadians, Bretons, and Mennonites arrived in the first half of the 20th century.

== Geography ==
The land is primarily glacial till with limited potential for agriculture, but it is suitable for some farming and livestock raising. The climate is continental with high variation between seasons. St. Laurent is in the Red River region of Manitoba, which is prone to flooding, and the village last suffered a major flood in the spring and summer of 2011.

St. Laurent has no central town square and is not exclusively organized around central roads, which is partially the result of the influence of the seigneurial system of New France, which allotted land with respect to the waterfront.

== Attractions ==
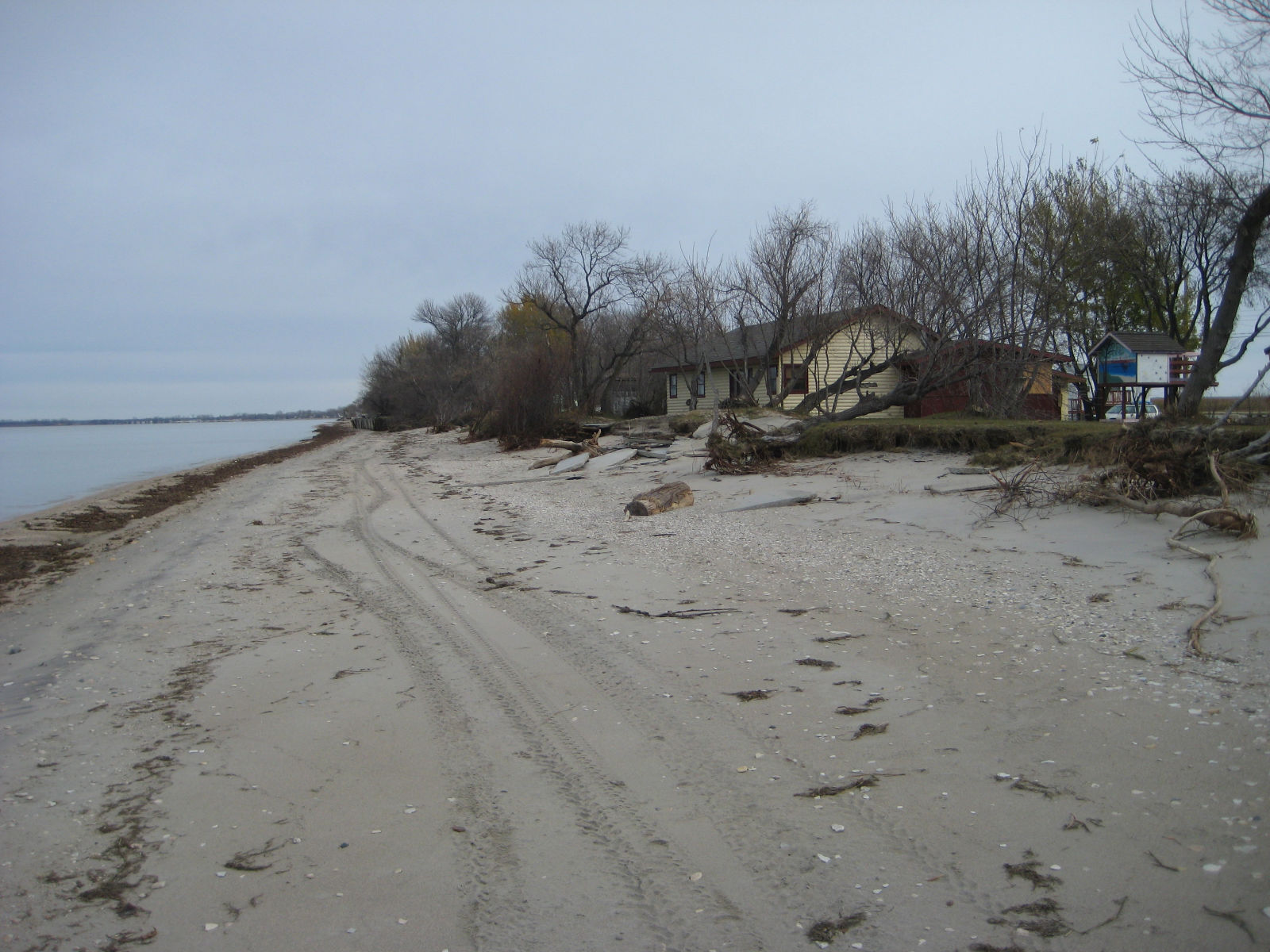
Twin Lakes Beach on Lake Manitoba.

Attractions in St. Laurent and area include the following events and destinations.

- Manipogo Festival is held at the end of the ice-fishing in March.
- Manipogo Golf & Country Club near Twin Lakes Beach.
- Meindl Beach and Big Tree Park
- Métis Days
- Métis Music Festival is held in the community of Oak Point yearly on the labour day weekend.

== See also ==
- Twin Lakes Beach, Manitoba
- St. Laurent de Grandin, Saskatchewan
