= Steep Rock =

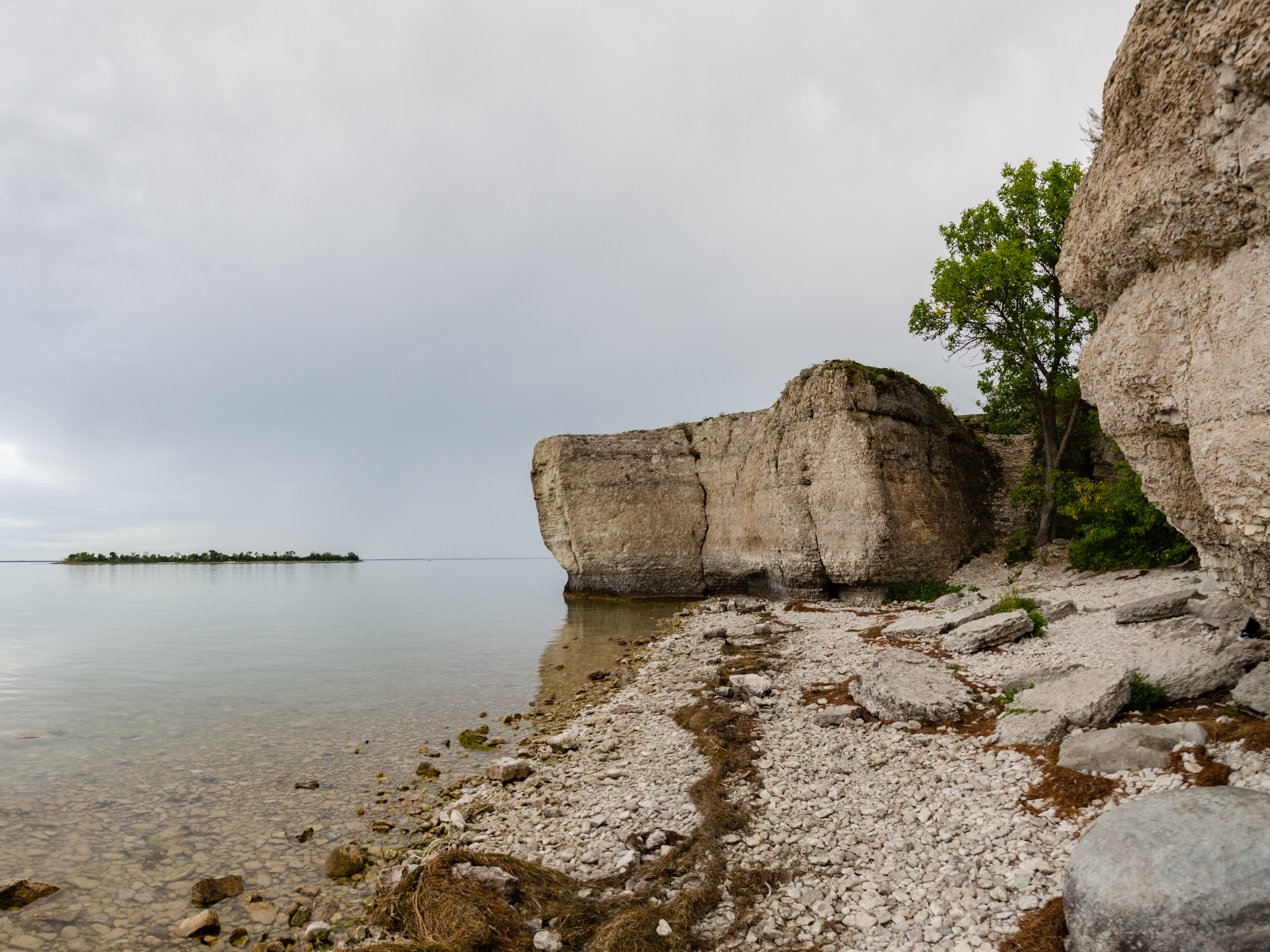
- Limestone cliffs of Steep Rock

- Location of Steep Rock in Manitoba
- Coordinates: 51°26′33″N 98°47′59″W
- Country: Canada
- Province: Manitoba
- Region: Interlake
- Census Division: No. 18

Government
  - Governing Body: Rural Municipality of Grahamdale Council
  - MP: James Bezan
  - MLA: Derek Johnson
- Time zone: UTC−6 (CST)
  - Summer (DST): UTC−5 (CDT)
- Postal Code: R0C 2Y0
- Area code: 204
- NTS Map: 062O07
- GNBC Code: GBALI

Steep Rock is a community in central Manitoba, on the eastern shore of Lake Manitoba. It is located in the Rural Municipality of Grahamdale. Road transportation is provided by Manitoba Highway 6 which connects Thompson with Winnipeg.
