= Moosehorn =

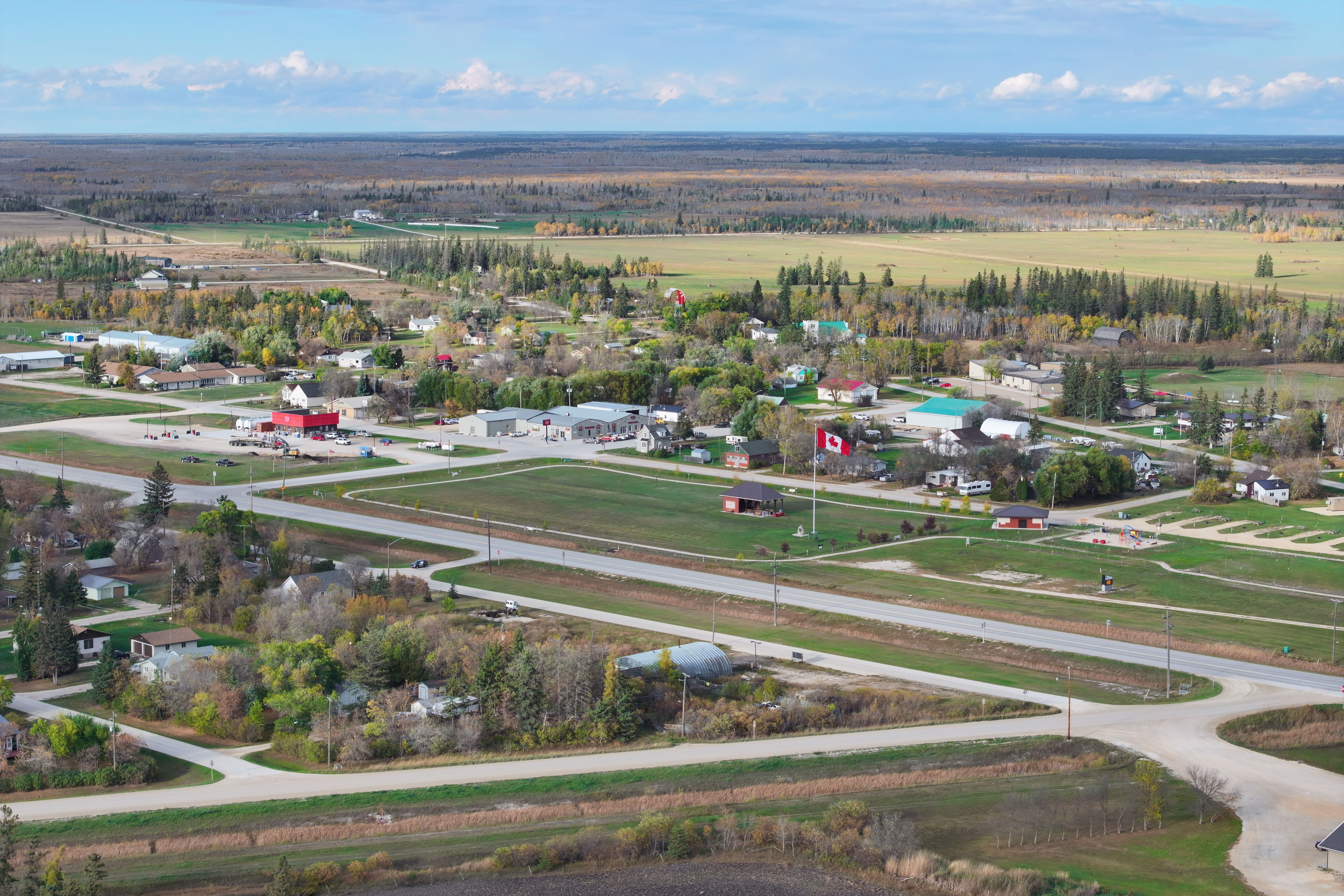
- Moosehorn in 2025

- Location of Moosehorn in Manitoba
- Coordinates: 51°17′29″N 98°25′22″W
- Country: Canada
- Province: Manitoba
- Region: Interlake
- Census division: No. 18
- Rural municipality: Grahamdale
- Time zone: UTC−6 (CST)
  - Summer (DST): UTC−5 (CDT)
- Area code: 204
- Highways: PTH 6 / PR 237

Moosehorn is an unincorporated community in the province of Manitoba, Canada. It is approximately 198 km (123 mi) northwest of Winnipeg within the Rural Municipality of Grahamdale.

A Post Office and Canadian National Railway point on 31-26-7WPM and a School District on 32-26-7W. Records indicated that the railway point was so named due to the large number of moose and elk which used to live in the area, presumably based on large numbers of antlers being found. The settlement of Moosehorn began in 1908 when surveying was done to organize the area into sections. In 1911, the railway established a siding around which the town was built. The highway was established by 1946.
