= Division No. 21, Manitoba =

Census division in Canada

Coordinates: 54°20′N 99°40′W

Division No. 21, also informally known as Flin Flon-Northwest, is a census division within the Province of Manitoba, Canada. Unlike in some other provinces, census divisions do not reflect the organization of local government in Manitoba. These areas exist solely for the purposes of statistical analysis and presentation; they have no government of their own.

Census maps show that the division also includes the northernmost portion of Lake Winnipeg (that portion north of the 53rd parallel north) as part of its southeasternmost section.

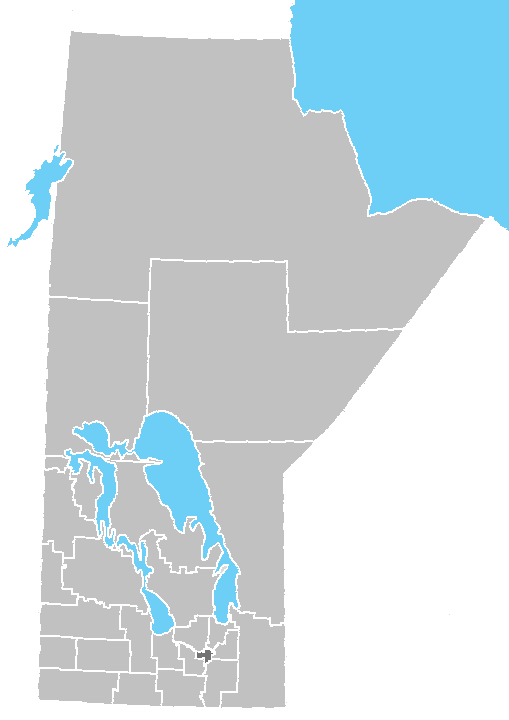

The division had a population of 21,606 in the Canada 2006 Census.

== Demographics ==
In the 2021 Census of Population conducted by Statistics Canada, Division No. 21 had a population of 21,871 living in 8,089 of its 9,632 total private dwellings, a change of −0.5% from its 2016 population of 21,983. With a land area of 42,801.19 km^{2} (16,525.63 sq mi), it had a population density of 0.5/km^{2} (1.3/sq mi) in 2021.

== City ==
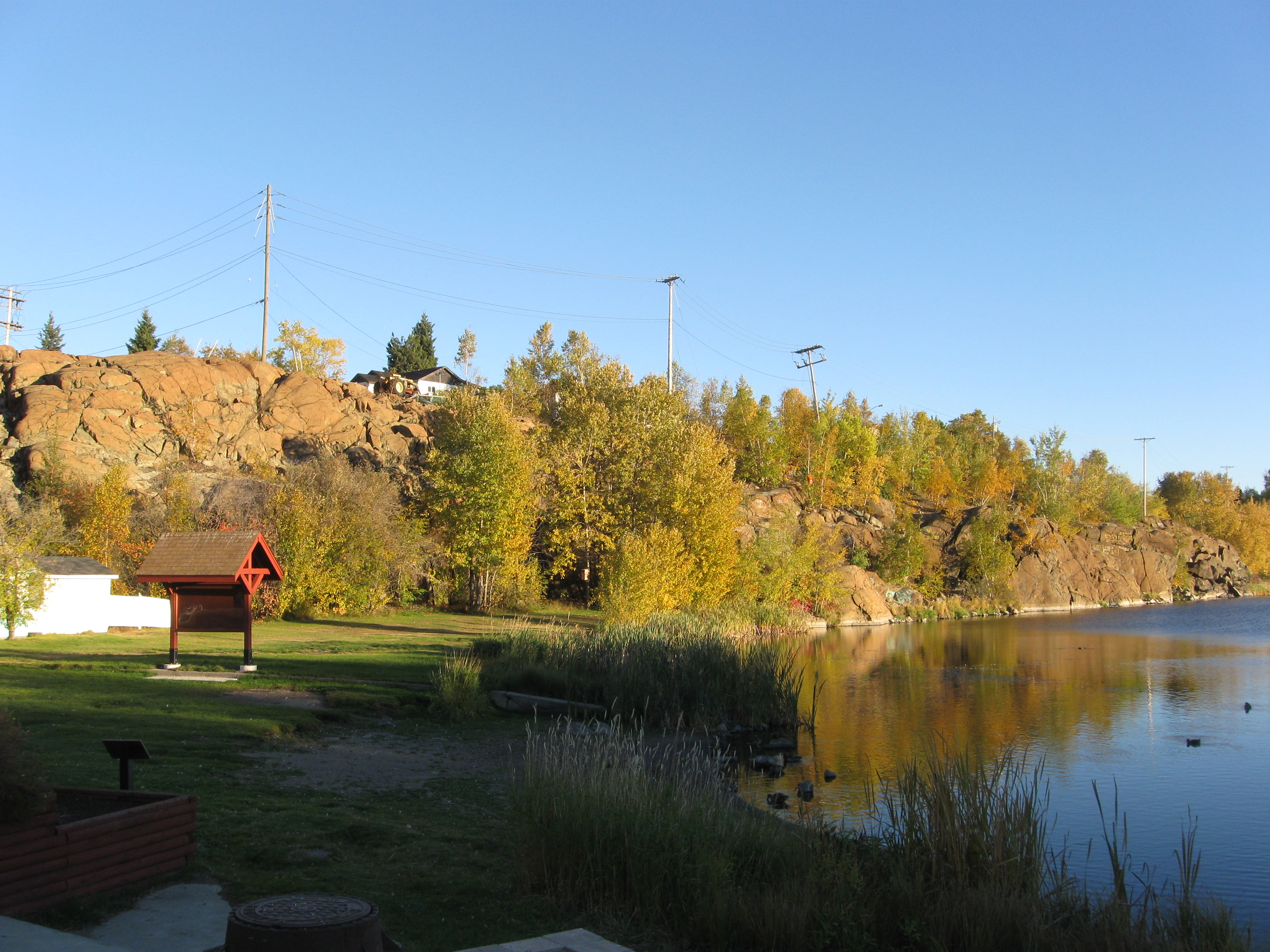
Flin Flon

- Flin Flon

== Towns ==
- Grand Rapids
- Snow Lake
- The Pas

== Rural Municipality ==
- Kelsey

== First Nations reserves ==
- Chemawawin 2
- Grand Rapids 33
- Moose Lake 31A
- Opaskwayak Cree Nation (21A, 21B, 21C, 21E, 21I)
- Sapotaweyak Cree Nation (partially)

== Unorganized areas ==
- Unorganized Division No. 21
- Finger
