= Rural Municipality of St. Laurent =

Rural municipality in Manitoba, Canada

- Rural municipality
- Location of the RM of St. Laurent in Manitoba
- Coordinates: 50°27′45″N 97°48′22″W
- Country: Canada
- Province: Manitoba
- Region: Interlake

Area
  - Land: 480.15 km^{2} (185.39 sq mi)

Population (2021)
  - Total: 1,542
- Time zone: UTC-6 (CST)
  - Summer (DST): UTC-5 (CDT)
- Area codes: 204 and 431
- Website: rmstlaurent.com

The Rural Municipality of St. Laurent (French: Municipalité rurale de Saint-Laurent) is a rural municipality (RM) located in the Interlake Region of Manitoba and has Lake Manitoba as its western boundary and is serviced by Highway 6. The community of St. Laurent lies within its boundaries.

The initial incorporation of the municipality took place on 25 May 1881. It functioned as a Local Government District from 1944 until 1974 when it regained RM status.

== Communities ==
- Harperville
- Oak Point
- St. Laurent

== Demographics ==
In the 2021 Census of Population conducted by Statistics Canada, St. Laurent had a population of 1,542 living in 667 of its 1,260 total private dwellings, a change of 15.2% from its 2016 population of 1,338. With a land area of 480.15 km^{2} (185.39 sq mi), it had a population density of 3.2/km^{2} (8.3/sq mi) in 2021.

== See also ==
- List of francophone communities in Manitoba
