= Unorganized Division No. 21, Manitoba =

Coordinates: 54.62°N 100.54°W

Division No. 21, Unorganized, or Flin Flon–Snow Lake–Kelsey Unorganized, is an unorganized area in northwestern Manitoba. It consists of all of Division No. 21 excluding municipalities and reserves. Unlike in some other provinces, census divisions do not reflect the organization of local government in Manitoba. These areas exist solely for the purposes of statistical analysis and presentation; they have no government of their own.

It has a population of 1,756 as of 2011, and an area of 40,910.10 km^{2}.
