= Pine Creek, Manitoba =

Coordinates: 51.9881°N 100.1525°W

Pine Creek is a place in the province of Manitoba, Canada that is designated as both an unincorporated community and a settlement. It is located approximately 95 km (59 mi) north of Dauphin within the Pine Creek Indian Reserve No. 66A.
