= Fairford River =

Coordinates: 51°35′22″N 98°43′16″W

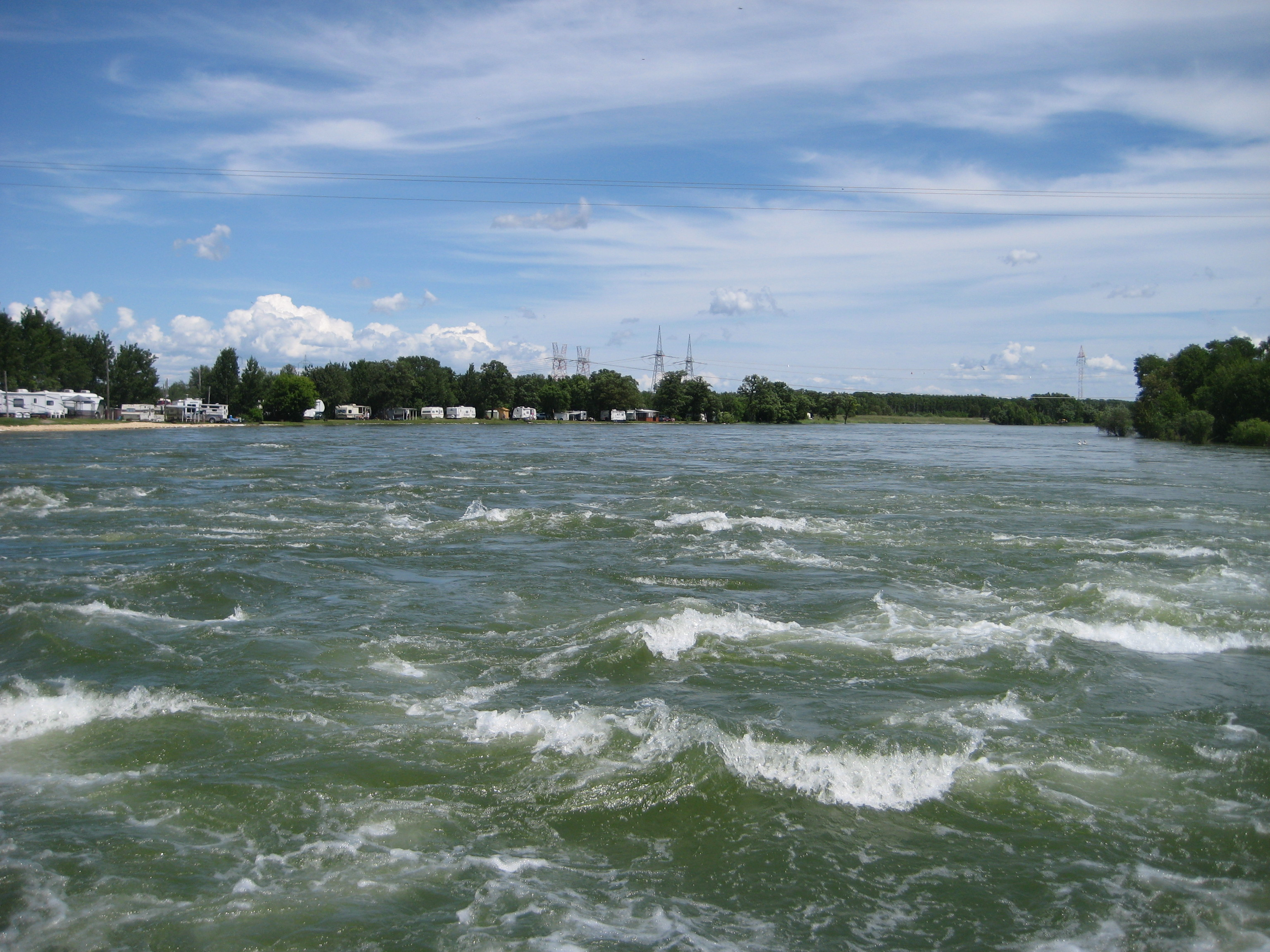
- The Fairford River looking east from the control structure

- Location of mouth

Location
- Country: Canada
- Province: Manitoba

The Fairford River is a river of Manitoba, Canada. It flows out of the north end of Lake Manitoba into Lake Pineimuta and Lake St. Martin.

Regulation of Lake Manitoba dates back to the late 1890s and in 1961 the dam on the river, the Fairford River Water Control Structure (FRWCS) was completed to control outflows. The 1961 works also included widening and deepening of the channel, particularly between Lake Manitoba and the dam, more than tripling the capacity when the lake is at a level of 248 metres (813 ft) above sea level.

In times of low water, outflows from Lake Manitoba into the Fairford River are reduced, while during high water levels the gates of the control structure are open to allow water to run down the river and into Lake Pinemuta and Lake St. Martin before eventually ending up in Lake Winnipeg via the Dauphin River. Using the Fairford Dam, the water levels are to be regulated between 247.0 and 247.7 metres (810.5 and 812.5 ft) above sea level. The average annual outflow from Lake Manitoba into the Fairford River between 1972 and 2001 was 2.502979 cubic kilometres (2,029,198 acre⋅ft).

During the 2011 Assiniboine River flood, at the peak, the Fairford River took on record flows of about 620 cubic metres per second (22,000 cu ft/s).

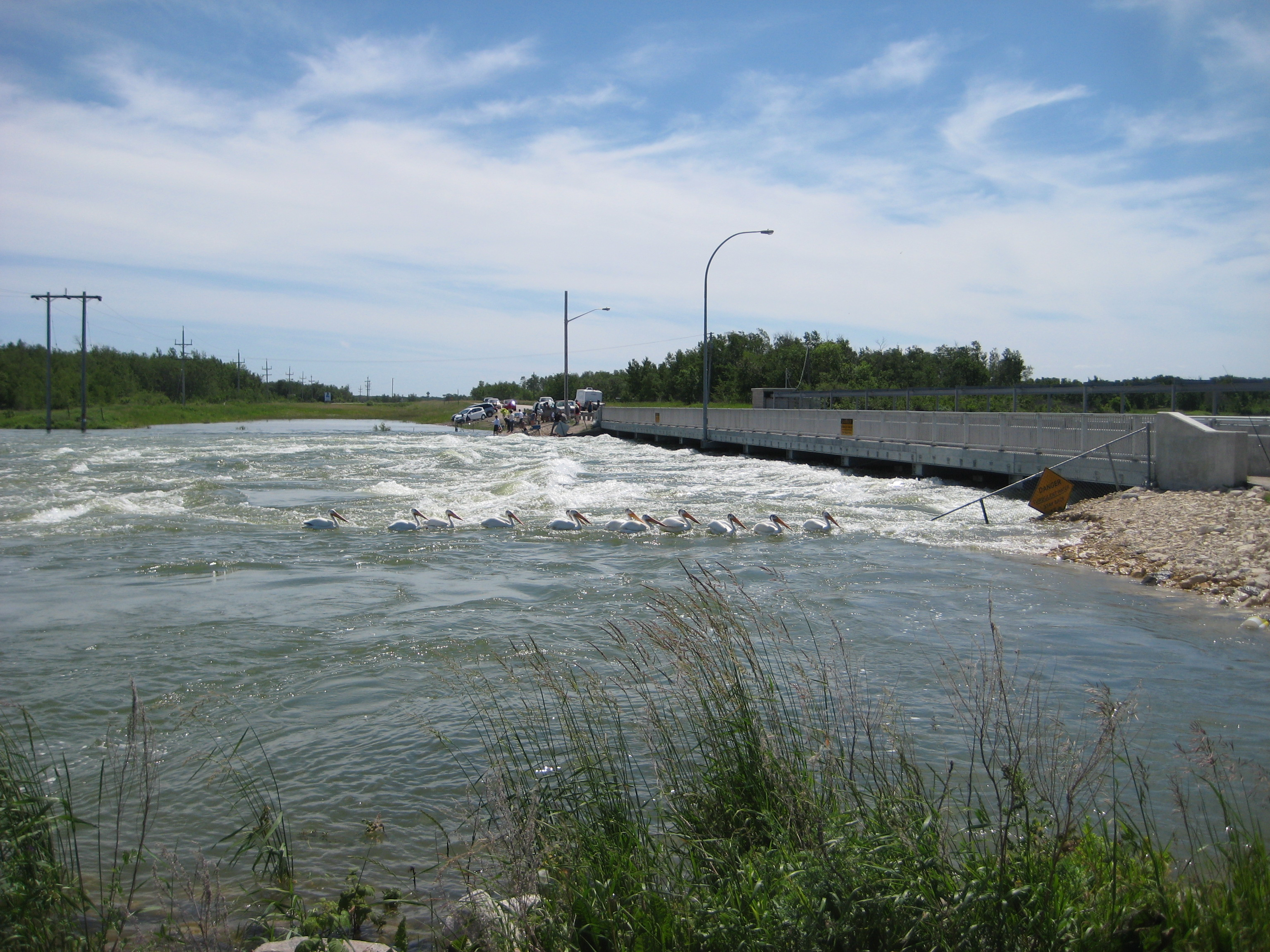
The Fairford River Water Control Structure with flows of about 590 cubic metres per second (21,000 cu ft/s)

== See also ==
- Lake Manitoba
- List of rivers of Manitoba
