= Gypsumville =

- Location of Gypsumville in Manitoba
- Coordinates: 51°46′8″N 98°38′5″W
- Country: Canada
- Province: Manitoba
- Region: Interlake
- Census Division: No. 18

Government
  - MP: James Bezan
  - MLA: Derek Johnson
- Time zone: UTC−6 (CST)
  - Summer (DST): UTC−5 (CDT)
- Postal Code: R0C 1J0
- Area code: 204
- NTS Map: 062O15
- GNBC Code: GAKCE

Gypsumville is a community in Manitoba, Canada. It is 242 kilometres north-northwest of Winnipeg in the Interlake Region of Manitoba on the north bank of Lake St. Martin in the Rural Municipality of Grahamdale.

There are 285 people living in and 175 housing units within the community.

== History ==
The community was named Gypsumville after a post office with a same name was opened in 1905. The office was named after the gypsum deposits found in the area. Deposits were discovered in 1888 and by 1890 mining operations begun.

A shortline railway was built from Gypsumville to the shore of Lake Manitoba, where the gypsum was transloaded on to barges and shipped to a railhead on the Whitemud River at south end of the lake, near the present community of Westbourne.

In 1912, the Canadian Northern Railway, which later became part of Canadian National Railway, built a rail line in to Gypsumville along the CN Oak Point subdivision.

Both of the railway lines are now abandoned with CN closing their line in 1992.

== CFS Gypsumville ==
In 1962 RCAF Station Gypsumville was opened in town as a Pinetree Line radar station by the RCAF and supported as a mini-base until 1987 when the then Canadian Forces Station Gypsumville closed down.
