= Dauphin River =

River in Manitoba, Canada

Coordinates: 51°57′39″N 98°03′31″W

The Dauphin River is a river of Manitoba, Canada. The Dauphin is part of the connection from Lake Manitoba to Lake Winnipeg. The Fairford River flows from Portage Bay in Lake Manitoba through to Lake St. Martin then the Dauphin River continues north-eastward from Lake St. Martin into Lake Winnipeg. The two streams parallel Manitoba Provincial Road 513 much of the way. The Fairford River passes through the Rural Municipality of Grahamdale in its flow eastward.

Water Survey of Canada has operated a hydrometric station on the Dauphin River near the community of Dauphin River (52°0'7" N, 98°19'47" W) since 1977. The gross drainage area above the monitoring station, excluding the diversion from the Assiniboine River near Portage la Prairie, is about 82,300 square kilometres (31,800 sq mi).

Henry Youle Hind writing around 1860, alternatively gave the Dauphin River the names Little Saskatchewan and Rapid River.

== See also ==
- List of rivers of Manitoba
