= Dauphin River, Manitoba =

Coordinates: 51.959°N 98.065°W

Dauphin River is a community in the Canadian province of Manitoba.

The name Dauphin River actually refers to two closely tied communities; Anama Bay and some members of Dauphin River First Nation. It is located at the mouth of the Dauphin River, where it empties into Lake Winnipeg at Sturgeon Bay. It became a recognized entity in March 1970 and is administered under the Northern Affairs Act by a mayor and council .

== Demographics ==
In the 2021 Census of Population conducted by Statistics Canada, Dauphin River had a population of 5 living in 5 of its 5 total private dwellings, a change of -75% from its 2016 population of 20. With a land area of 1.25 km^{2} (0.48 sq mi), it had a population density of 4.0/km^{2} (10.4/sq mi) in 2021.
