= Lake St. Martin First Nation =

Coordinates: 51.748036°N 98.43571°W

Lake St. Martin First Nation (Ojibwe: Obashkodeyaang) is a Canadian First Nations government and Treaty 2 signatory.

The First Nation was based primarily at Lake St. Martin about 225 kilometres (140 mi) northwest of Winnipeg until May 2011. When a massive flood hit Manitoba, the Government of Manitoba decided to divert water to Lake St. Martin in order to protect cottages and agricultural properties on other bodies of water. As a result all the housing at Lake St. Martin First Nation was destroyed. As of 2019, approximately 1,000 flood evacuees are still displaced.

== Reserves ==
- The Narrows 49 2,613.30 hectares (6,457.6 acres)
- The Narrows 49A 982 hectares (2,430 acres)
