= Little Saskatchewan First Nation =

Little Saskatchewan 48
- Indian reserve
- Indian Reserve 48
- Location within Manitoba
- Coordinates: 51.6807808°N 98.6438251°W

Area
  - Land: 13.54 km^{2} (5.23 sq mi)

Population (2021)
  - Total: 627
- Little Saskatchewan First Nation
- Sas-ka-chew-wa-niiz
- Treaty: Treaty 2

Government
- Chief: Hayden Dinkclar (2019-2026)
- Council: Morden Deaffie; Kings Mckay; Kaiden Sumner; Layne Campbell

Tribal Council
- Interlake Reserves Tribal Council

Little Saskatchewan First Nation (Ojibwe: Kaakiiskakamigaag) is a First Nations community in the Interlake Region of central Manitoba. Its main reserve is the Little Saskatchewan 48.

It is a signatory of Treaty 2.
