= Oak Point, Manitoba =

Coordinates: 50.4986°N 98.0069°W

Oak Point is a place in the province of Manitoba, Canada that is designated as both an unincorporated community and a settlement. It is approximately 92 km (57 mi) northwest of Winnipeg within the Rural Municipality of St. Laurent.
