= Dauphin River First Nation =

Coordinates: 51°57′19″N 98°3′28″W

Dauphin River First Nation (Ojibwe: Isickachewanoong or alternatively Zaaskajiwaning) is an Ojibway First Nation band government in Manitoba, Canada. Its landbase is the Dauphin River First Nation Reserve 48A, located at the outlet of the Dauphin River into Lake Winnipeg. The largest city nearest this community is Winnipeg located approximately 250 km (155 mi) to the southeast.

The current Chief of Dauphin River First Nation is Lawrence Letandre. The Tribal Council affiliated with this First Nation is Interlake Reserves Tribal Council Inc. Dauphin River First Nation is part of Treaty 2 Adhesion, signed on August 21, 1871.

== Demographics ==
Dauphin River First Nation 48A Reserve is 325.8 hectares (805.0 acres). As of 2008, the total population of registered Indigenous residents was 285 (156 female/129 male) with 200 on reserve, and 85 off reserve. The primary language spoken is Ojibwe.

== Environmental profile ==
Known best for its fishing, Dauphin River is home to many Master Angler Awards from Walleye to Northern Pike. The most popular fishing spots include the Warpath and Mantago Rivers.
