= Lake Manitoba First Nation =

Dog Creek 46 Ojibwe: Animo-ziibiing
- Indian reserve
- Lake Manitoba First Nation
- Location within Manitoba
- Coordinates: 50°54′30″N 98°35′50″W
- Country: Canada
- Province: Manitoba

Area
  - Land: 54.48 km^{2} (21.03 sq mi)

Population (2021)
  - Total: 899
  - Density: 35.4/km^{2} (92/sq mi)

Lake Manitoba First Nation (Ojibwe: Animo-ziibiing) is located on the Dog Creek 46 Indian reserve in Manitoba. The reserve, which lies on the northeast shore of the south basin of Lake Manitoba, is bordered by the Municipality of West Interlake. The 2021 Canadian census reported a population of 899 inhabitants on the reserve.
