= Pinaymootang First Nation =

First Nations people whose home location is at Fairford, Manitoba, Canada

Pinaymootang First Nation (also spelt in Ojibwe as Binemoodaang, meaning Partridge Crop Place) is a First Nations people whose home location is on Fairford 50 Reserve at Fairford in the Rural Municipality of Grahamdale, Manitoba, Canada. They are situated on Provincial Trunk Highway 6 (PTH 6) in the Interlake Region of Manitoba about 220 kilometres from Winnipeg. The Rural Municipality of Grahamdale forms most of the reserve's land boundary, although it also has a short border with the Little Saskatchewan First Nation as well as significant lakeshore on Lake St. Martin, which is considered as being outside the reserve. The main settlement on the reserve is located at 51°35′55″N 98°41′32″W.

The geographically separate second part of the Fairford 50 reserve is located on Dunsekikan Island (51°37′26″N 98°26′32″W) in Lake St. Martin, and is about ten miles east of the main section of the reserve.

The registered population on Fairford 50 is about 1300 people while an additional 1600 live in various other locations. The 2011 Census showed an official population of 989 persons living at Fairford 50.

The Chief of the First Nation for over 40 years was Levi Bruce. In December 2023 Cindy Woodhouse was elected National Chief of the Assembly of First Nations.
