= Rural Municipality of Grahamdale =

Rural municipality in Manitoba, Canada

- Rural municipality
- Location in Manitoba
- Coordinates: 51°25′12″N 98°22′24″W
- Country: Canada
- Province: Manitoba
- Region: Interlake

Area
  - Land: 2,385.42 km^{2} (921.02 sq mi)

Population (2016)
  - Total: 1,359
- Time zone: UTC-6 (CST)
  - Summer (DST): UTC-5 (CDT)
- Area codes: 204 and 431
- Website: www.grahamdale.ca

Grahamdale is a rural municipality (RM) in the province of Manitoba in Western Canada. It lies in the Interlake Region. It was incorporated as a local government district on 1 January 1945, and became a rural municipality in 1997.

The municipality exists in two sections that are separated by a part of the Fairford 50 Indian reserve. It extends from Gypsumville to Mulvihill and incorporates the former RM of Woodlea within its present boundaries.

== Communities ==
- Camper
- Faulkner
- Grahamdale
- Gypsumville
- Hilbre
- Moosehorn
- Mulvihill
- St. Martin
- St. Martin Junction
- Spearhill
- Steep Rock

== Demographics ==
In the 2021 Census of Population conducted by Statistics Canada, Grahamdale had a population of 1,278 living in 579 of its 886 total private dwellings, a change of −4.2% from its 2016 population of 1,334. With a land area of 2,365.94 km^{2} (913.49 sq mi), it had a population density of 0.5/km^{2} (1.4/sq mi) in 2021.
