= Lake Manitoba =

Lake in Manitoba, Canada

- Location of the lake in Manitoba Lake Manitoba (Canada)

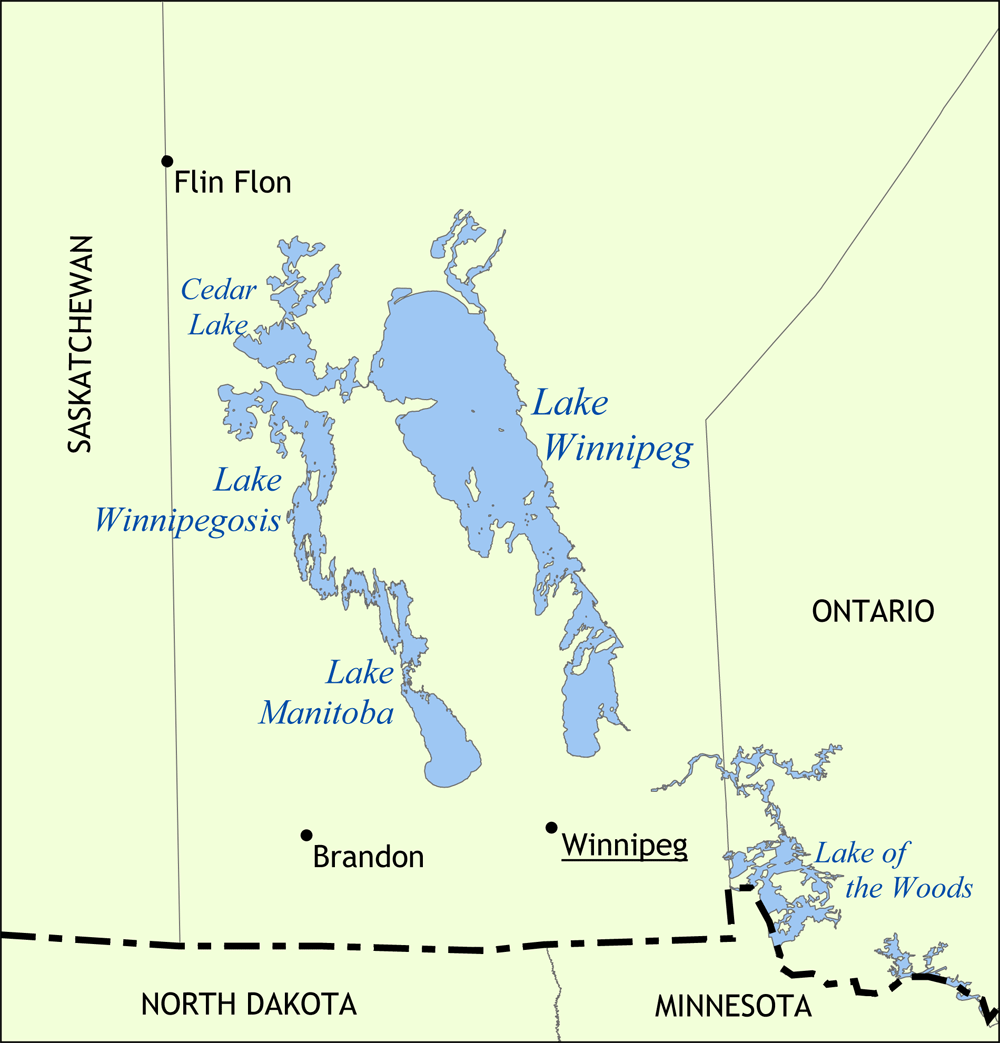
- Location: Manitoba
- Coordinates: 50°59′N 98°48′W
- Lake type: Glacial lake
- Primary inflows: Waterhen River; Whitemud River
- Primary outflows: Fairford River
- Catchment area: 54,630 km^{2} (21,090 sq mi)
- Basin countries: Canada
- Max. length: 200 km (120 mi)
- Max. width: 45 km (28 mi)
- Surface area: 4,624 km^{2} (1,785 sq mi)
- Max. depth: 7 m (23 ft)
- Water volume: 14.1 km^{3} (3.4 cu mi)
- Residence time: North basin: 2 years; South basin: 28 years
- Salinity: 0.35‰ (hyposaline)
- Surface elevation: 247 m (812 ft)
- Settlements: Fairford, Steep Rock, St. Laurent, Sandy Bay

Lake Manitoba (French: Lac Manitoba) is the 14th largest lake in Canada and the 31st largest lake in the world with a total area of 4,624 square kilometres (1,785 sq mi). It is located within the Canadian province of Manitoba about 75 kilometres (47 mi) northwest of the province's capital, Winnipeg, at 50°59′N 98°48′W.

== History ==
The lake, its shores populated by the Assiniboine and Cree, was made known to Europeans by La Vérendrye in the mid-1730s. He and his sons travelled from Fort La Reine through this lake to explore the Saskatchewan River and its environs. Forts were established on both the Saskatchewan and Cedar Lake. It also was part of the fur trade route to Hudson Bay.

The name derives from Cree manitou-wapow or Ojibwa manidoobaa, both meaning "straits of Manitou, the Great Spirit", a toponym referring to what are now called The Narrows in the centre of the lake. These narrows were an area that the spirit could be heard. What exactly was heard, and in what exact location, seems to be a mystery. The lake was known to French explorers as Lac des Prairies.

The short-lived Republic of Manitobah and its successor the province of Manitoba both take their name from this lake.

=== Manipogo ===
For many years there have been claims that a monster similar to Scotland's Loch Ness Monster and British Columbia's Ogopogo lives in the lake. It has been named Manipogo. Sightings of this serpent like sea monster have been going on since roughly 1908.

== Geography ==
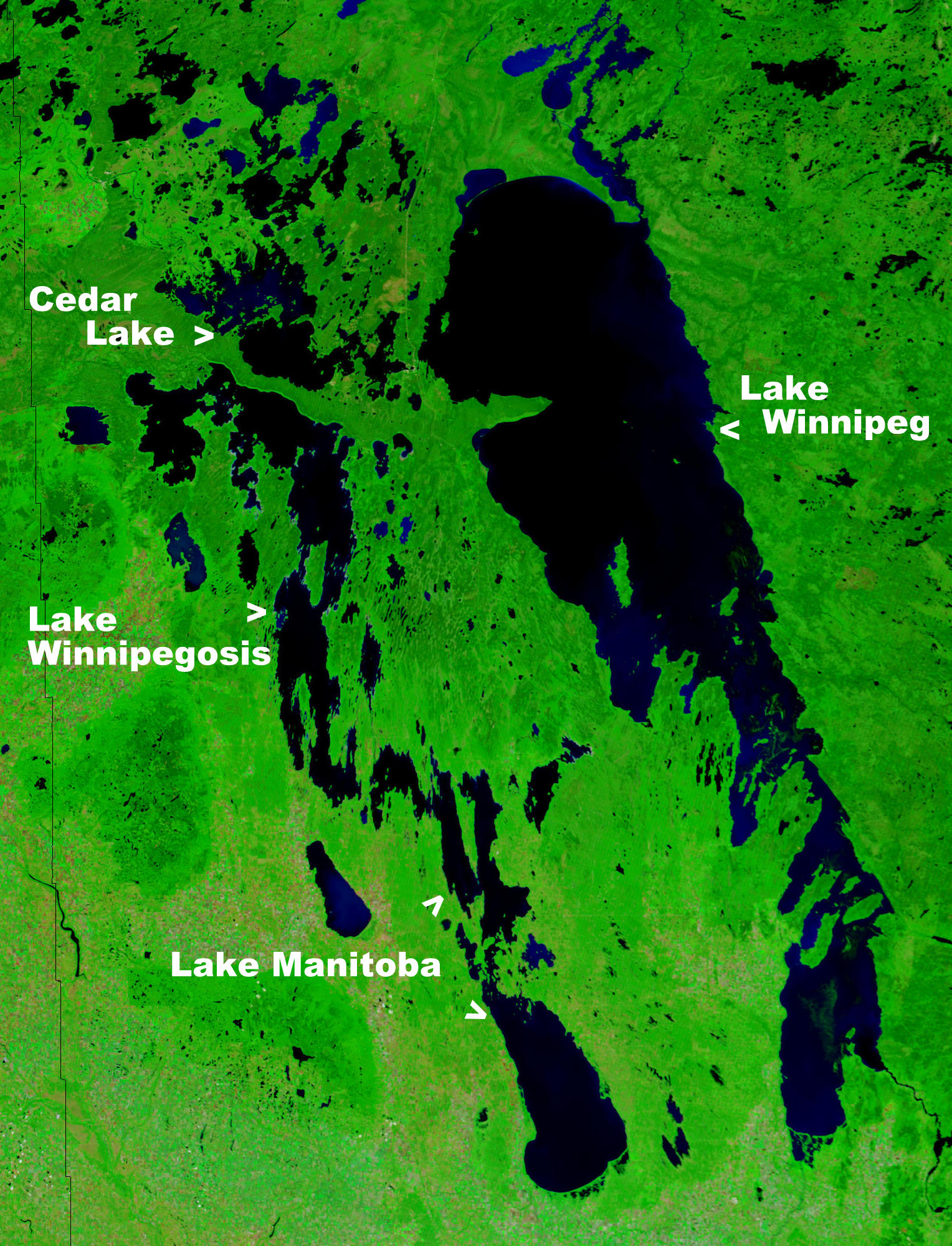
NASA image of Lake Manitoba

The irregularly shaped lake, about 200 kilometres (120 mi) long, is the smallest of a group of three large lakes, the other two being Lake Winnipeg (the largest) and Lake Winnipegosis, which are found on the floor of the prehistoric Glacial Lake Agassiz. The lake is subdivided into two connected but distinctly different basins: a small, irregular-shaped north basin and a much larger south basin. It is part of the watershed of the Nelson River and Hudson Bay.

The southern tip of the lake, 24 kilometres (15 mi) north of Portage la Prairie, Manitoba, ends in the Delta Marsh, an important staging ground for migrating birds.

Communities on the lake include Fairford, Steep Rock, St. Laurent, and Sandy Bay.

=== Tributaries and outflows ===
The lake is primarily fed by Lake Winnipegosis to its northwest via the Waterhen River, with an average annual contribution of 2.3 km^{3} (1,900,000 acre⋅ft). The Whitemud River and local overland flow average about 0.317 km^{3} (257,000 acre⋅ft). Precipitation contributes about 2.2 km^{3} (1,800,000 acre⋅ft). From 1970 to 2003 the Portage Diversion has contributed an average annual volume of 0.3044 km^{3} (246,800 acre⋅ft) from the Assiniboine River. Lake Manitoba drains northeast into Lake Winnipeg through the Fairford River to Lake St. Martin and then to the Dauphin River. The average annual river outflow is 2.50 km^{3} (2,030,000 acre⋅ft). Average evaporation is 2.49 km^{3} (2,020,000 acre⋅ft) per year. Most of the water inflow is from the Waterhen River (42% of the inflow) and from precipitation directly on the lake's surface (40%), while nearly 50% of the outflow is by evaporation. This explains its hyposaline nature.

=== Water control dam ===
Severe flooding around the lake led to the excavation of an improved outlet channel between 1899 and 1901. In 1933 following dry years in the late 1920s and early 1930s, the Province constructed a concrete control dam across the Fairford River immediately downstream of the channel. A new dam was constructed in 1961. The new structure is operated to try to control levels between 247.0 and 247.7 m (810.5 and 812.5 ft) above sea level.

Period	Maximum level	Average level	Minimum level	Average annual range
Pre 1960	248.79 m (816.25 ft)	247.55 m (812.17 ft)	246.86 m (809.92 ft)	0.43 m (1.4 ft)
1960–1999	247.95 m (813.48 ft)	247.47 m (811.92 ft)	247.00 m (810.36 ft)	0.39 m (1.27 ft)

=== Flood in 2011 ===
Due to above average snowfall over the winter of 2010–2011, and above average precipitation in the spring over the Lake Manitoba watershed, forecasted water levels on Lake Manitoba called for levels above the regulated upper range of 247.7 m (812.5 ft) above sea level and around the flood stage of 248 m (814 ft) above sea level. With the added inflows of the Portage Diversion due to high water levels on the Assiniboine River and its tributaries, of up to 960 m^{3}/s (34,000 cu ft/s) of water the lake peaked at 249.1 m (817.2 ft) above sea level on July 21. On May 31, 2011, when the lake was already very high, 248.45 m (815.13 ft), strong winds from the north and the north-west of 70 km/h (43 mph) gusting to 90 km/h (56 mph) caused major damage to beaches and communities on the south basin of the lake including Twin Lakes Beach, St. Laurent, St. Ambroise, Delta Beach, Lynch Point, Big Point, and large areas of farmland.

=== Historical floods ===
Unlike a river which can rise and recede relatively quickly, large lakes like Lake Manitoba require months or even years for lake levels to rise and fall. Below are the flood years on record in which Lake Manitoba was above flood stage, as defined by Manitoba Infrastructure and Transportation (MIT), of 248 m (814 ft) ASL. However, beginning around a level of 248 m (813 ft) ASL, localized flooding of agricultural land around the lake can occur.

Year(s)	Peak lake level (ASL)
2011-12	249.1 m (817.2 ft) (2011)
1881-82	> 249 m (817 ft) (1882)
1954-57	248.9 m (816.6 ft) (1955)
1913	> 249 m (816 ft)
2014	248.3 m (814.7 ft)
1924	248.2 m (814.2 ft)
1925	248.2 m (814.2 ft)

- In 1881-82 lake levels were not recorded. However, given the topography around Lake Manitoba, a level of 249 m (817 ft) ASL would be required to cause the lake to drain back into the Assiniboine River, which occurred in both 1881 and 1882. Also, a flow of 420.1 m^{3}/s (14,835 cu ft/s) was recorded on the Fairford River in 1881, long before significant channel improvements were made. Based on a rating curve for flows on the Fairford River during this period, the flows correlate with a lake level as high as 249.2 m (817.5 ft) ASL. Furthermore, in his 1890 study entitled "Report of Exploration of the Glacial Lake Agassiz in Manitoba", Warren Upham states that Lake Manitoba rose approximately 2.4 m (8 ft) above its lowest level, which records show to be around 250 m (810 ft) ASL, suggesting a peak of 249 m (818 ft) ASL.
- Lake Levels did not begin to be recorded until 1914. However, in 1913 a flow rate of 330 m^{3}/s (11,500 cu ft/s) on the Fairford River was recorded, which based on a rating curve for flows during this period would correspond with a lake level of greater than 249 m (816 ft) ASL.
- On May 31, 2011, during a major wind event, Lake Manitoba was measured at 250.05 m (820.37 ft) ASL at Twin Lakes Beach. As a result of the high water level with wind set-up and wave action, significant damage occurred along the south basin of Lake Manitoba. The 2011 peak flood level is the wind-eliminated peak lake level.

== Fishing ==
Lake Manitoba is one of the three main lakes in Manitoba's $30-million annual commercial fishing industry.

The main marketable fish species caught on Lake Manitoba has changed from whitefish in the late 19th century to walleye, sauger and yellow perch today. There has been a large increase in rough fish like carp. Tullibee catch remains high, although it is not considered a commercial species.

The total recorded catch of the commercial winter fishery on the lake has declined from 6.8 kilotonnes (15×10^{6} lb) annually in the late 1940s to less than 2.0 kilotonnes (4.5×10^{6} lb) in 2002.

== Gallery ==
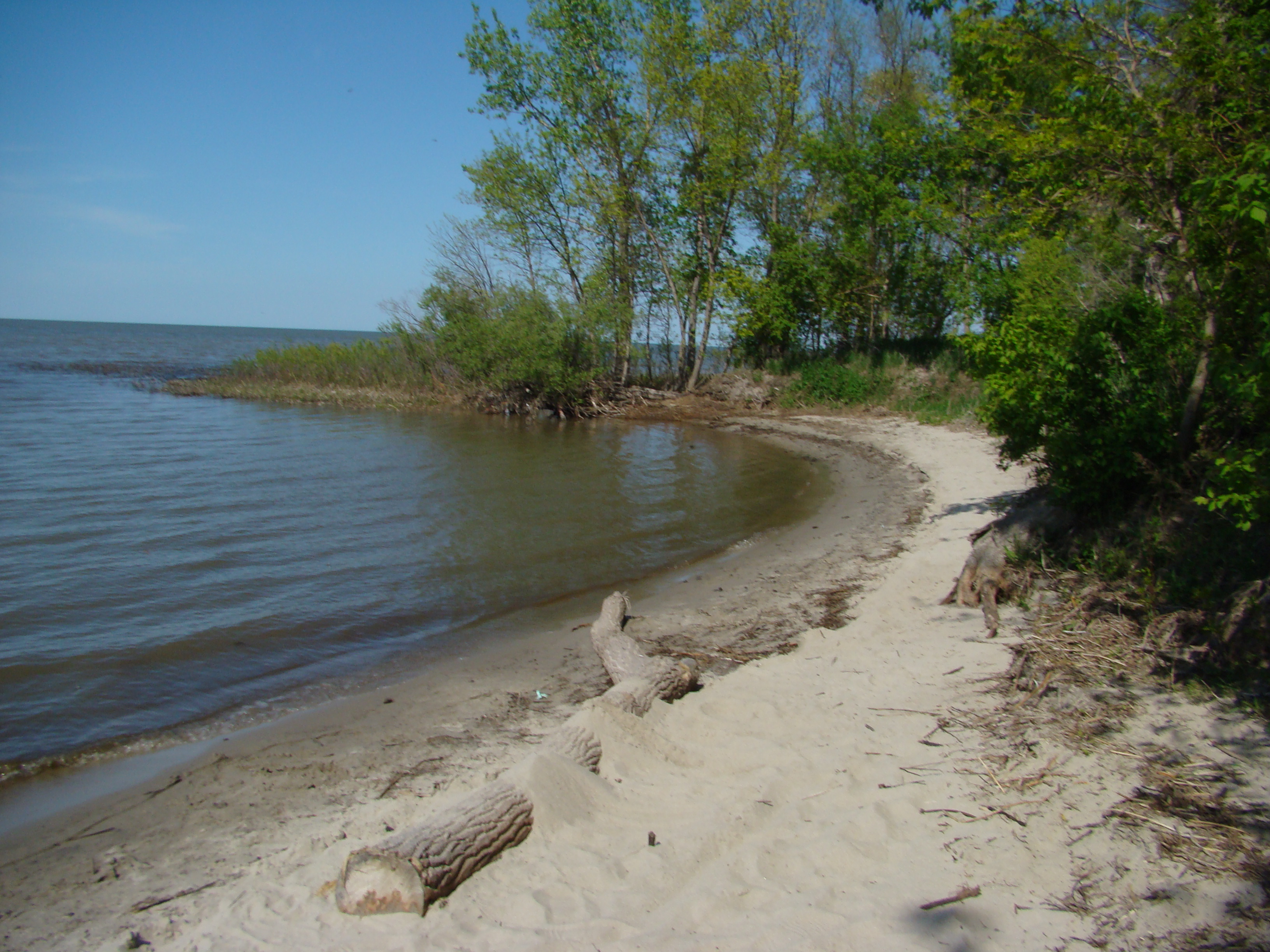
Delta Beach

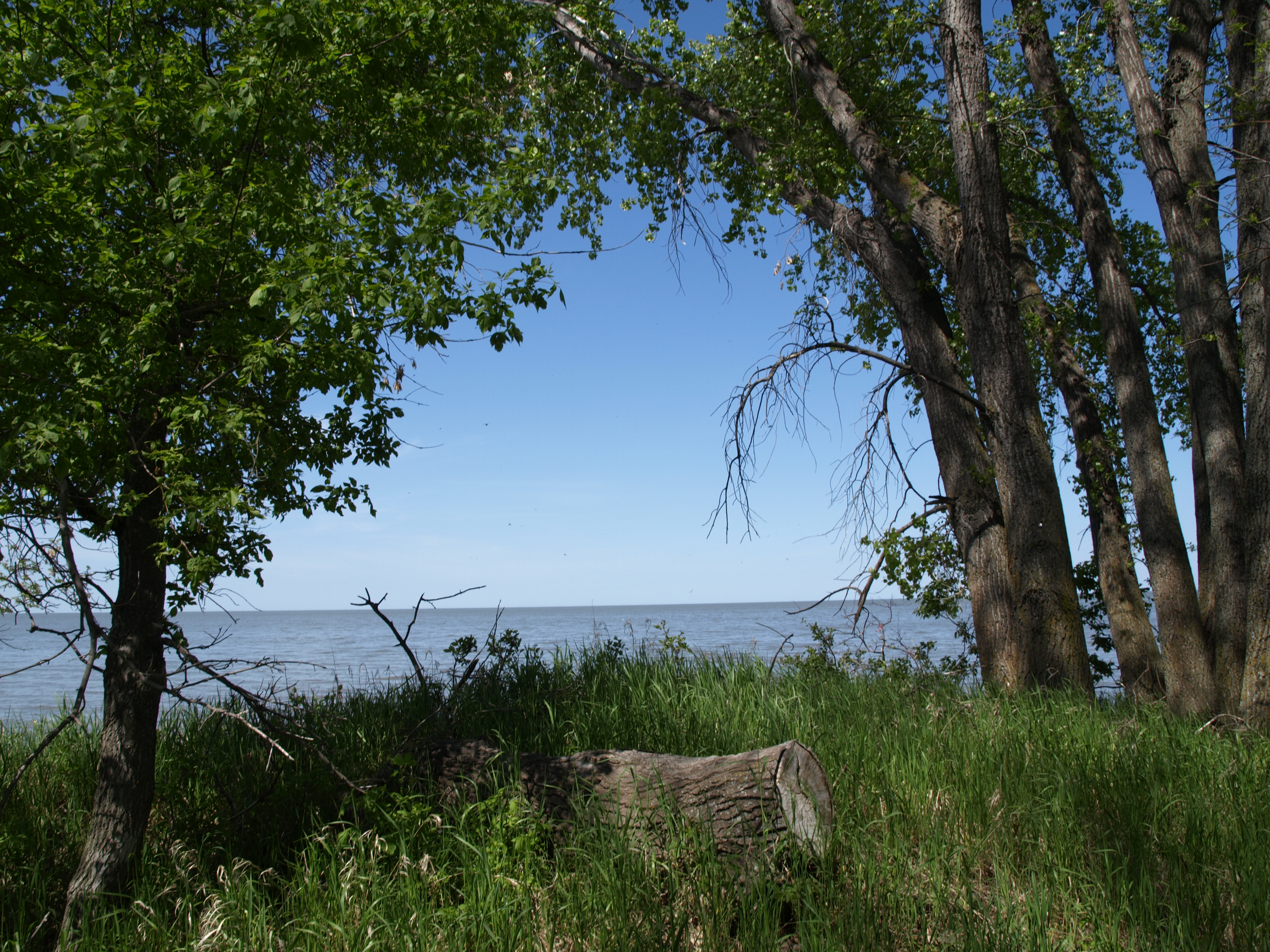
Lake Manitoba From Delta Marsh Field Station

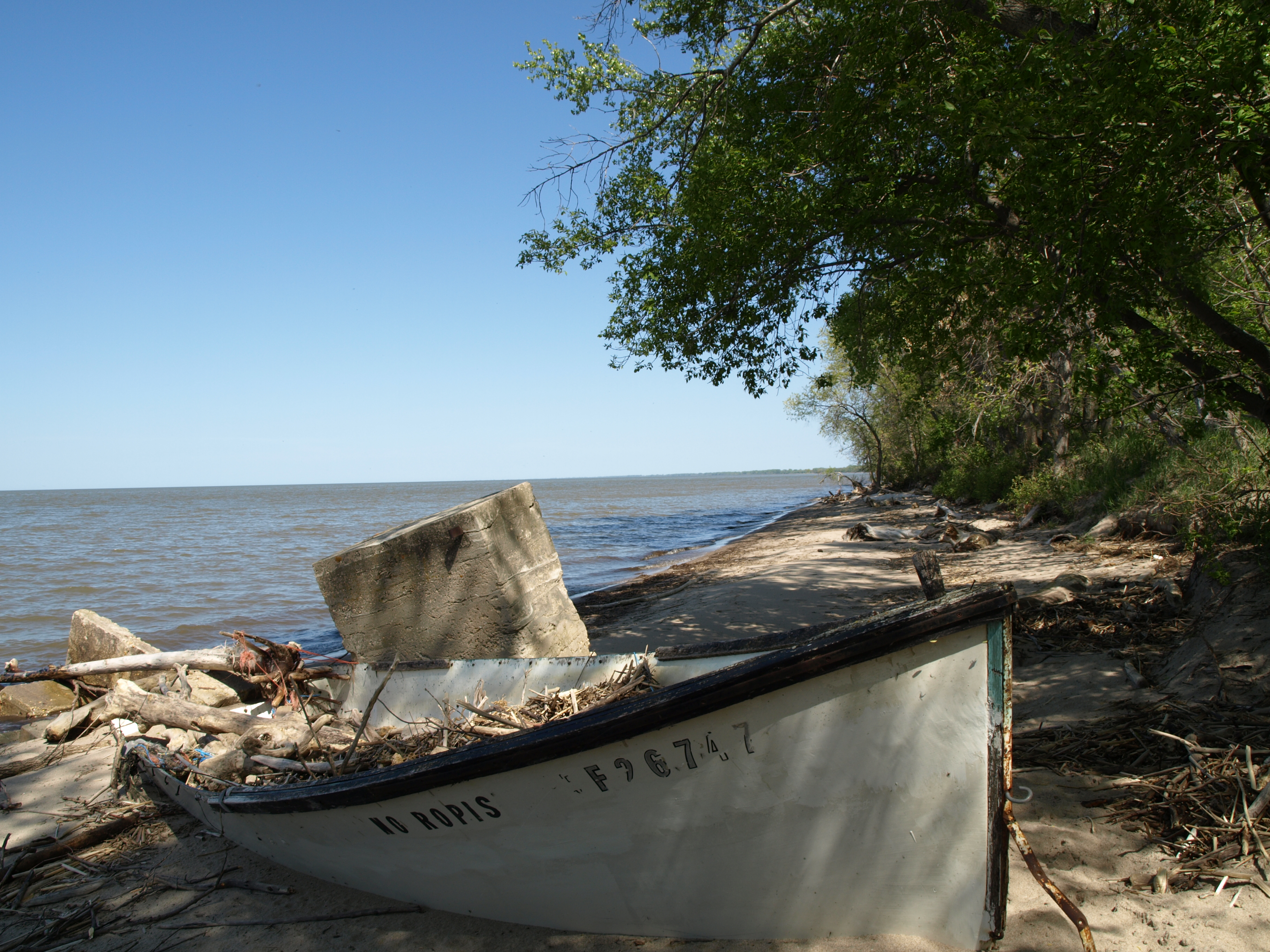
Lake Manitoba From Delta Marsh Field Station

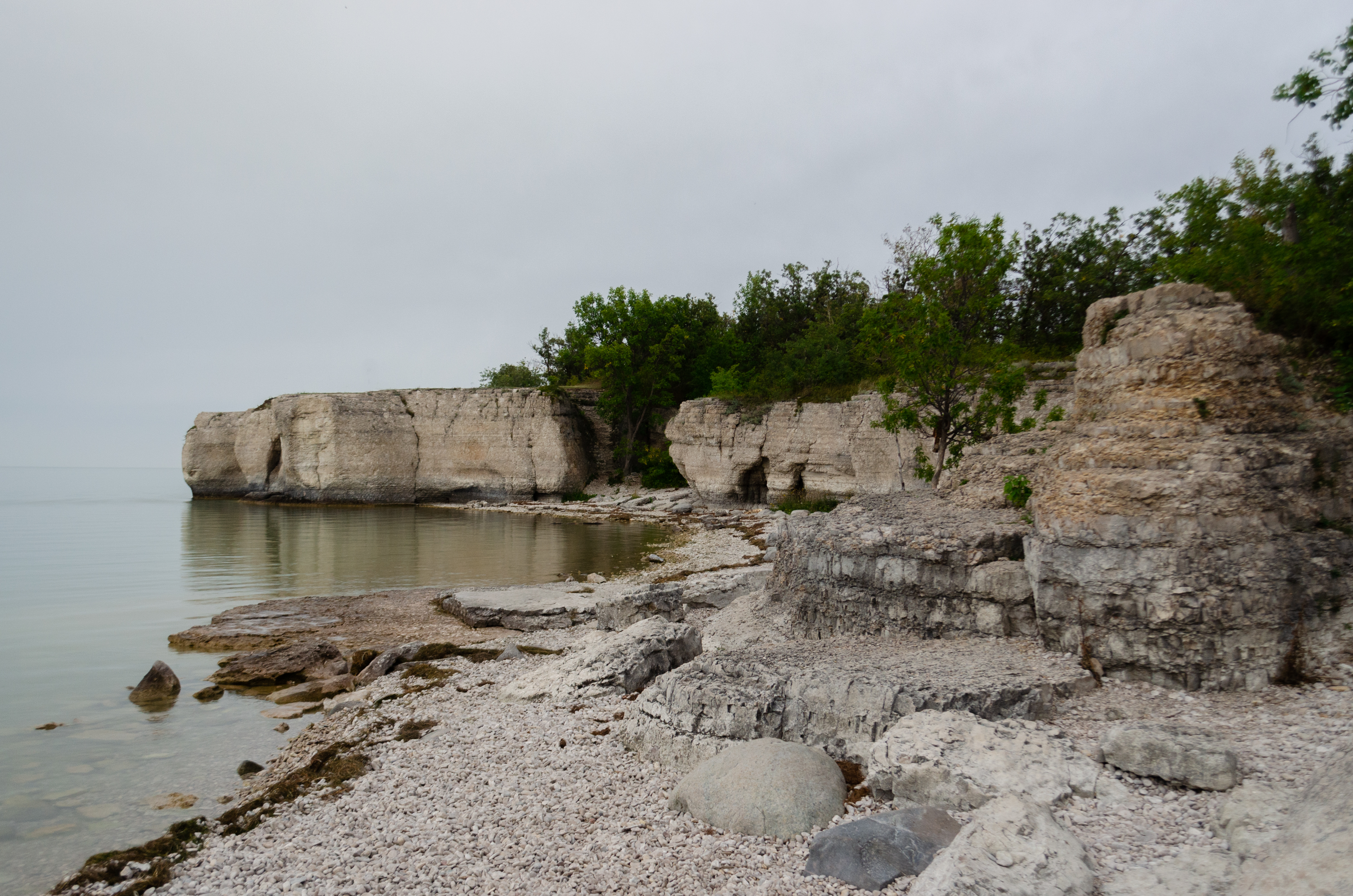
Limestone cliffs near Steep Rock

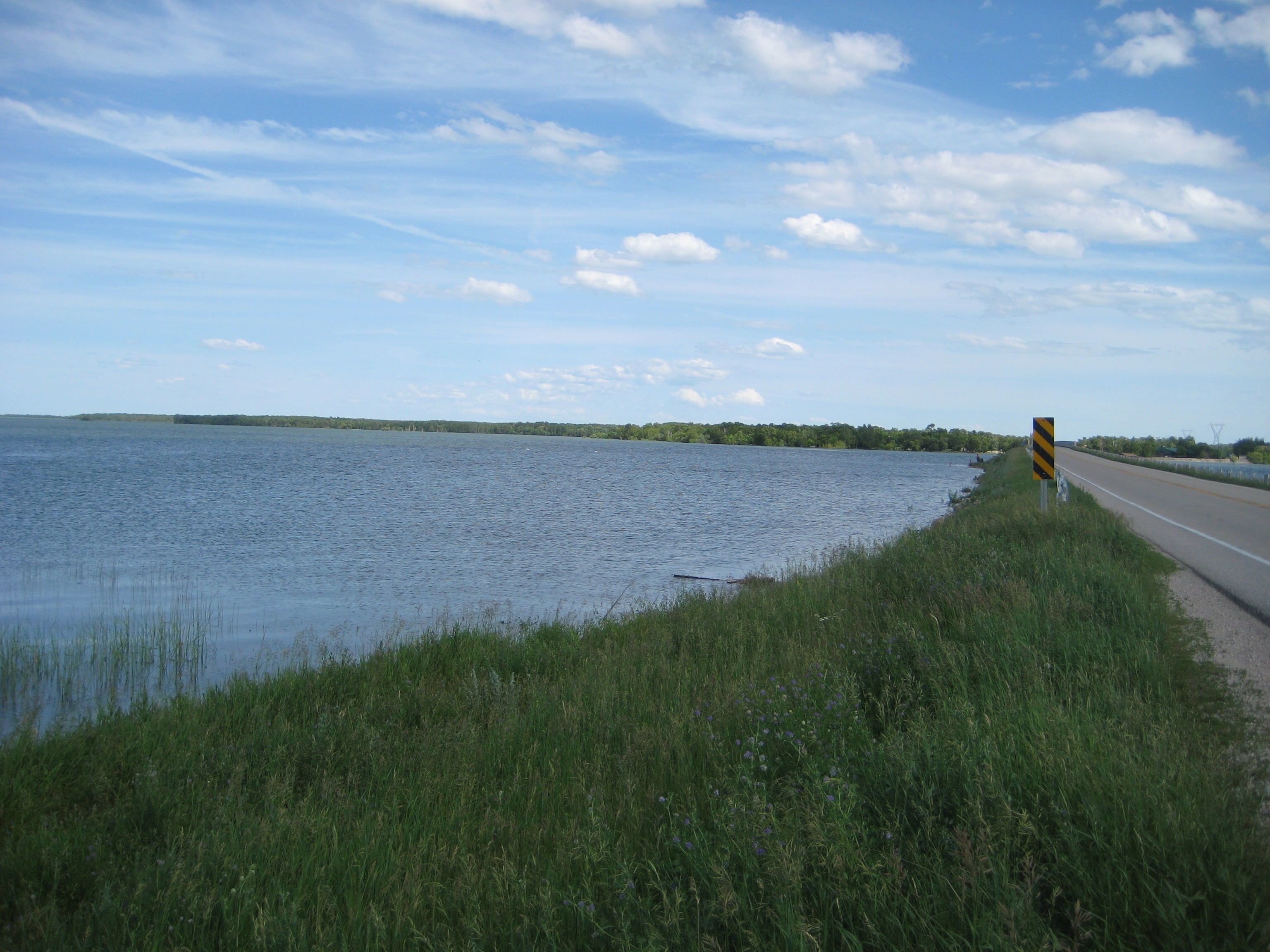
Lake Manitoba Narrows

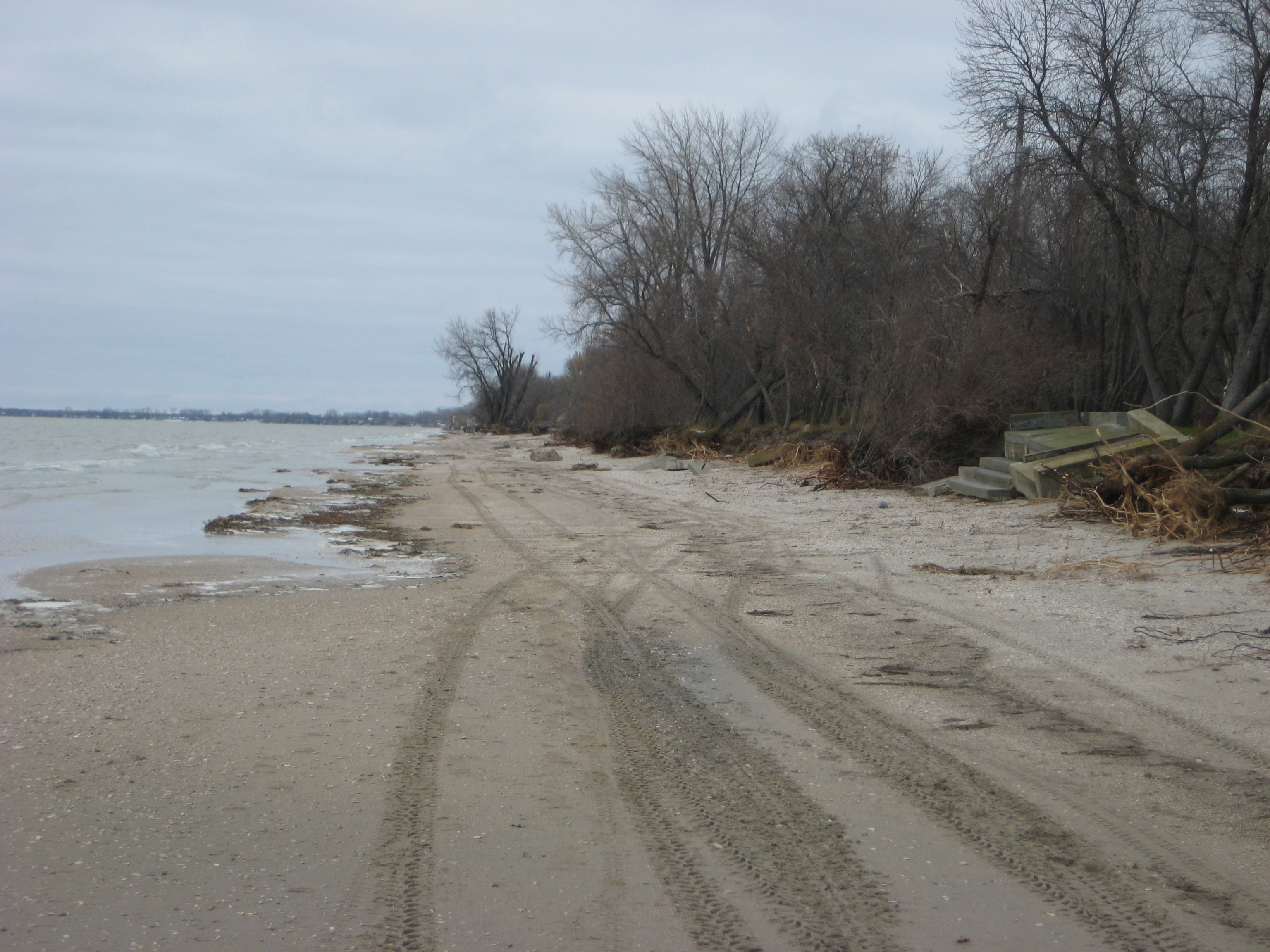
Twin Lakes Beach

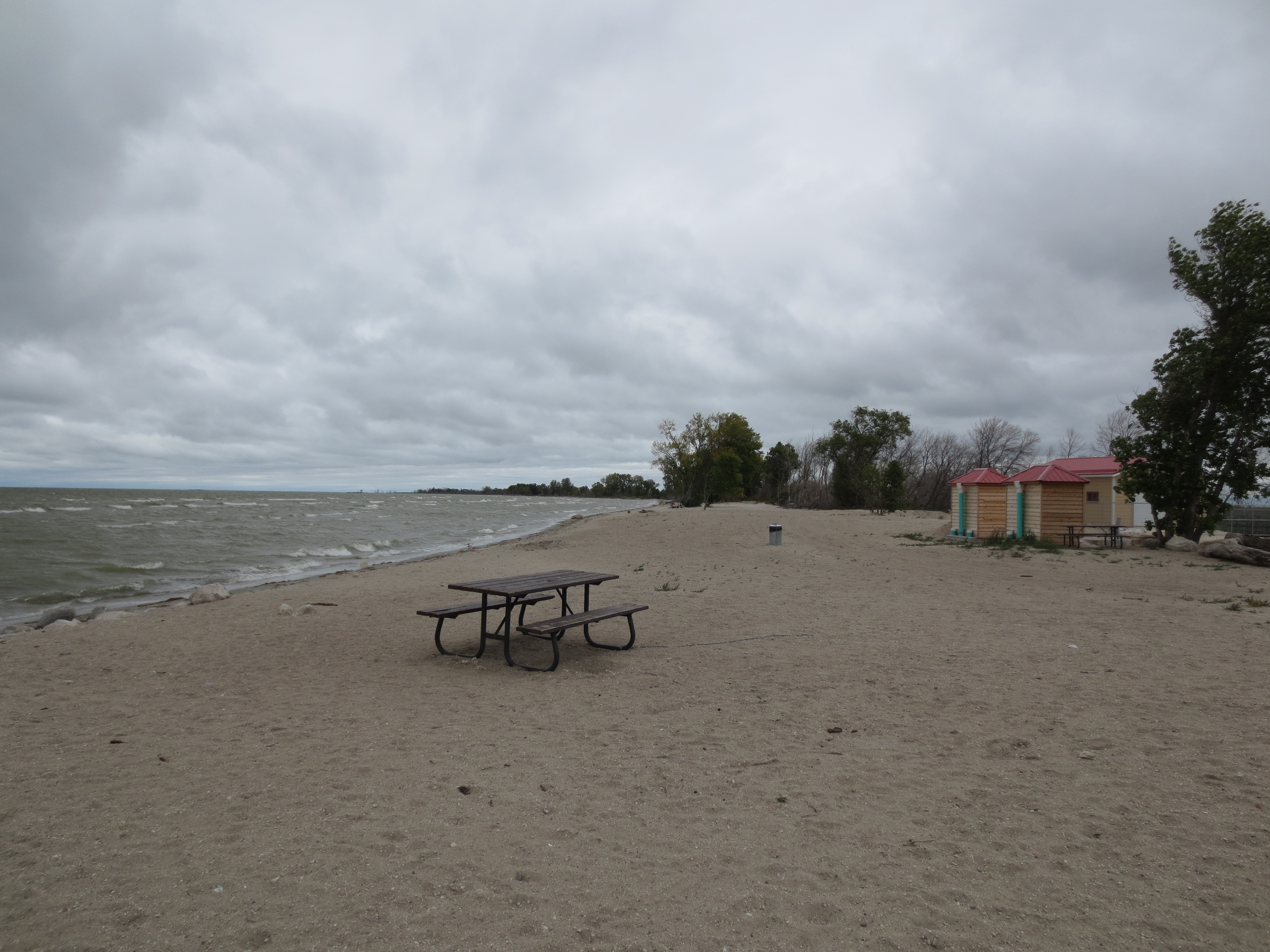
St. Ambroise Provincial Park Beach

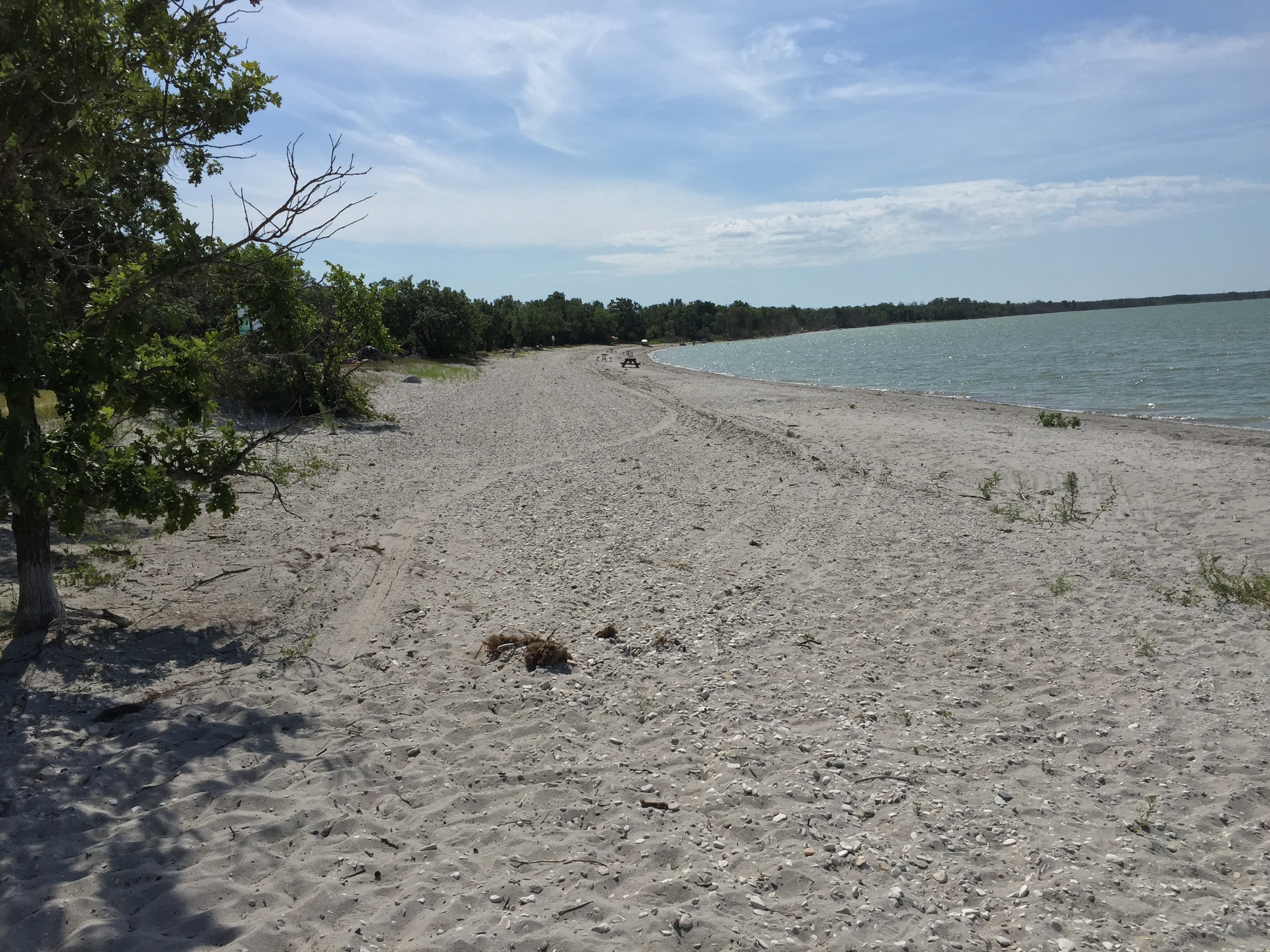
Watchorn Provincial Park Beach

== See also ==
- List of lakes of Manitoba
