= Northern Woods and Water Route =

Highway in Canada

Northern Woods and Water Route

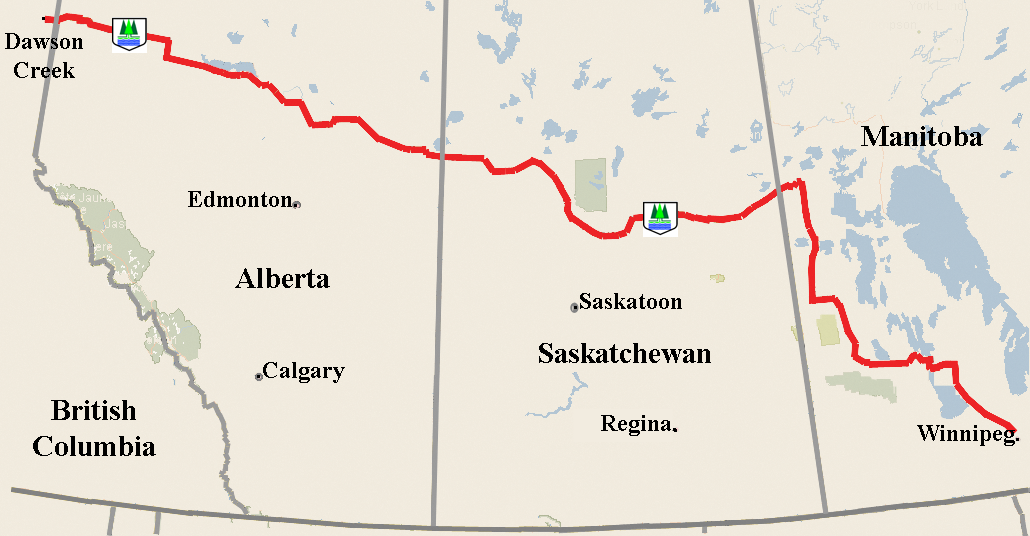

Route information
- Length: 2,400 km (1,500 mi)
- Component highways: Highway 49, Highway 49, Highway 2A, Highway 2, Highway 55, Highway 55, Highway 9, PR 283, PTH 10, PTH 5, PTH 68, PTH 6

Major junctions
- West end: Highway 2 at Dawson Creek, BC
- East end: PTH 101 at Winnipeg, MB

Location
- Country: Canada
- Provinces: British Columbia, Alberta, Saskatchewan, Manitoba

Highway system

The Northern Woods and Water Route is a 2,400-kilometre (1,500 mi) route through the northern regions of British Columbia, Alberta, Saskatchewan and Manitoba in Western Canada. Beginning in the 1950s, community groups came together to establish a northern travel route; this was proposed as the Northern Yellowhead Transportation Route. The Northern Woods and Water Route Association was established in 1974, and encouraged promotion of the route with the promise of an increase in tourist travel. The route was designated in 1974 and is well signed throughout its component highways. The route starts at Dawson Creek under the name Spirit River Highway and ends at the Perimeter Highway of Winnipeg, Manitoba, after running through the northern regions of the western provinces. From west to east, the Northern Woods and Water Route (NWWR) incorporates portions of British Columbia Highway 49; Alberta Highways 49, 2A, 2, and 55; Saskatchewan Highways 55 and 9; Manitoba Provincial Road 283 and Trunk Highways 10, 5, 68 and 6. The halfway point of the NWWR is approximately at Goodsoil, Saskatchewan.

Fur traders and early settlers used the rivers and Red River cart roads such as Long Trail until the early 20th century when the railroad and bush planes supplemented travel to this northern boreal transition area. After the fur trade era, corduroy roads provided a means for early land vehicles to cross over muskeg and swamp. Horse drawn ploughs filled low areas, settlers hauled gravel and cleared bush for the road ways surveyed along high elevations following lake and river shore lines. Municipalities graded and graveled important roads between trading centres. The all-weather road arrived alongside of the NWWR association's impetus for a travel and tourism corridor along the northern area of the western provinces. The amount of traffic in a given area is a major factor in determining highway classification, surface type, and construction upgrades.

== Route description ==
=== British Columbia ===
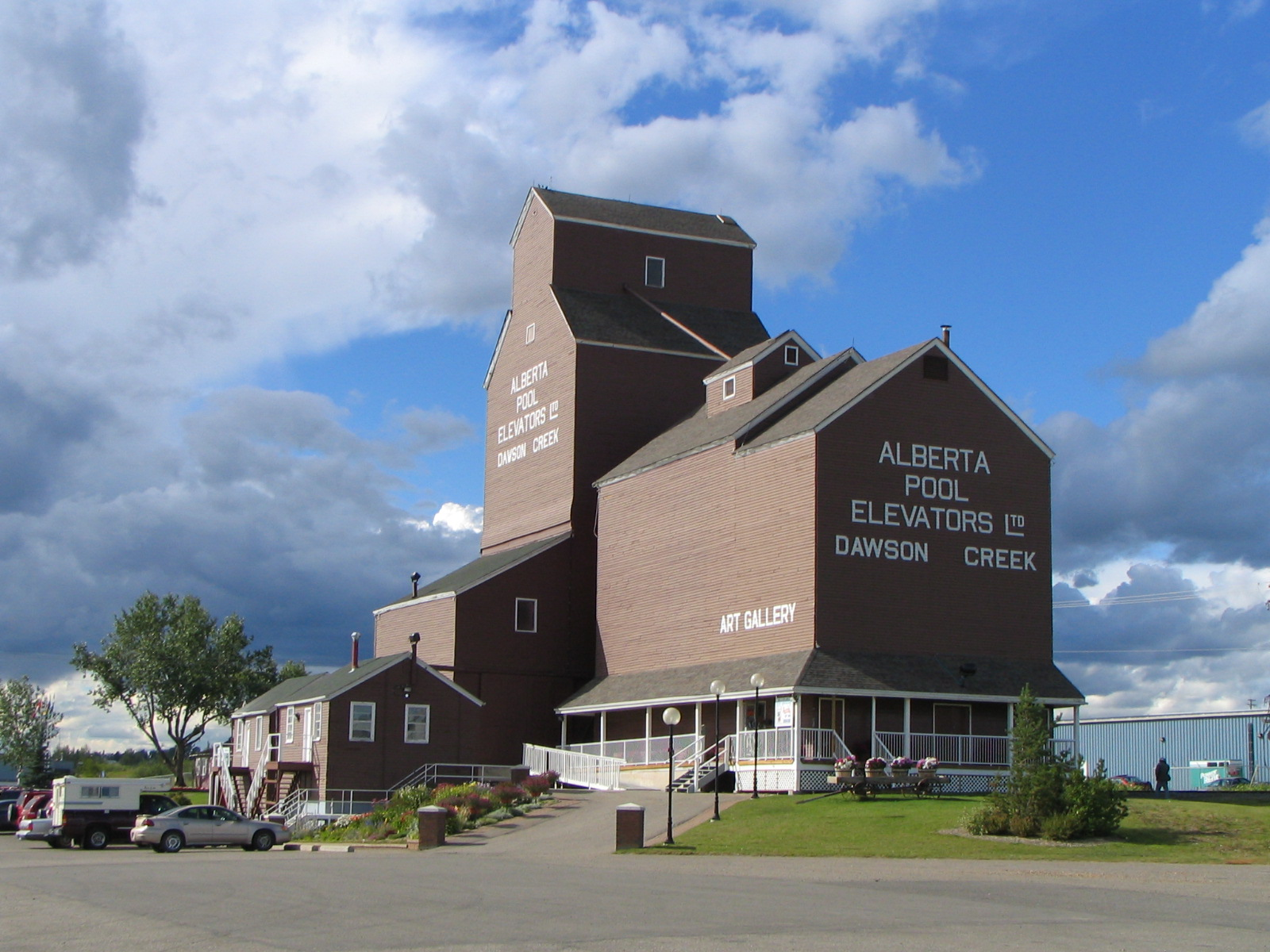
Dawson Creek, British Columbia

The NWWR starts at Dawson Creek in eastern British Columbia, at the intersection of Highway 2 and Highway 49. Two kilometres (1.2 mi) west of this intersection is Highway 97, which forms part of the Alaska Highway. Highway 49, also called the Spirit River Highway, travels for 15 km (9 mi) before reaching the Alberta border.

=== Alberta ===
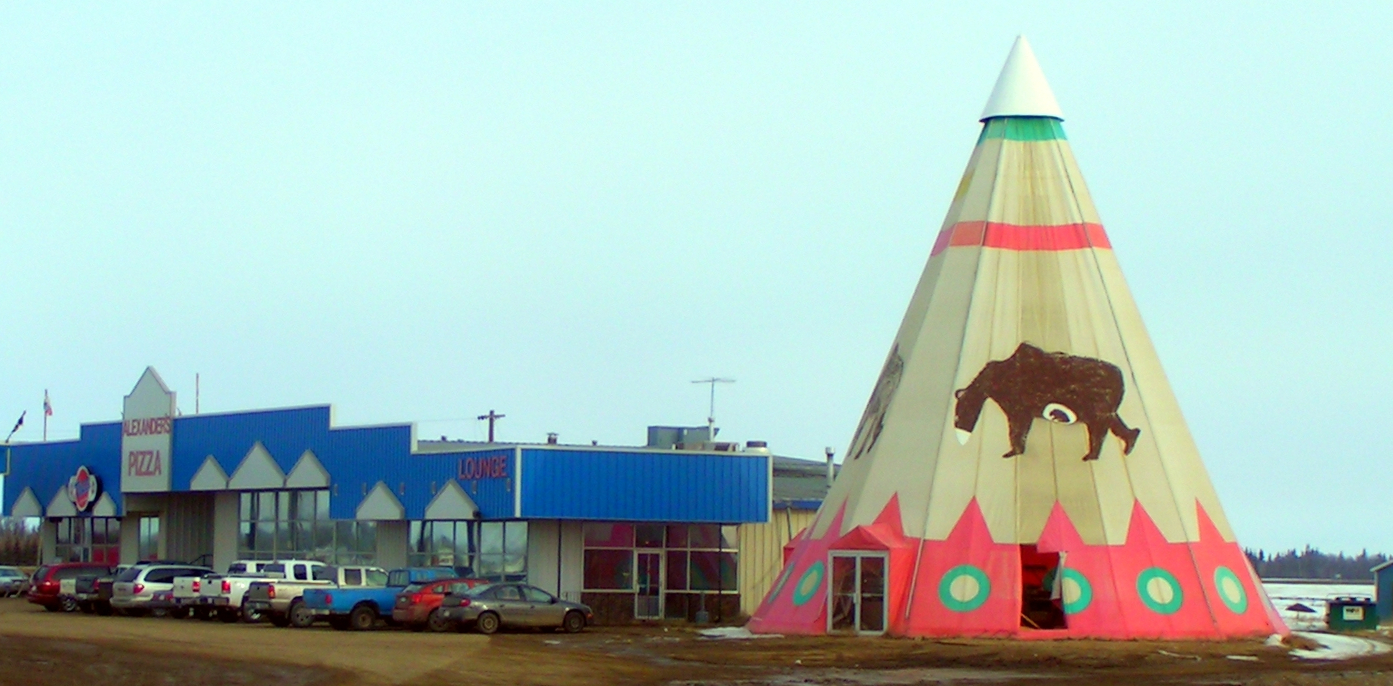
Rycroft, Alberta

The NWWR continues east into Alberta on Highway 49, the Spirit River Highway through Bay Tree, Spirit River and Rycroft. One route diverges slightly north on Highway 2 through Fairview and Peace River and then back south, while the other continues straight east towards Falher where both routes meet.

The NWWR heads south and then east from Falher on Alberta Highway 2 through McLeannan to High Prairie. The route continues southeast along Lesser Slave Lake, passing through Joussard, Kisuno and Slave Lake on the way to Athabasca. The town of Athabasca on the Athabasca River marks the transition between the NWWR connector routes Highway 2 and Highway 55. The route meanders northeast along Highway 55 from Athabasca to the hamlet of Lac La Biche, passsing Plamondon to the north. The hamlet of Lac La Biche is located south of Lac la Biche and Beaver Lake. From Lac La Biche, the NWWR goes straight south, then turns to stay on Highway 55 through LaCorey, a hamlet north of Bonnyville, all the way to Cold Lake. From there, the route goes south and then east across the Alberta/Saskatchewan border.

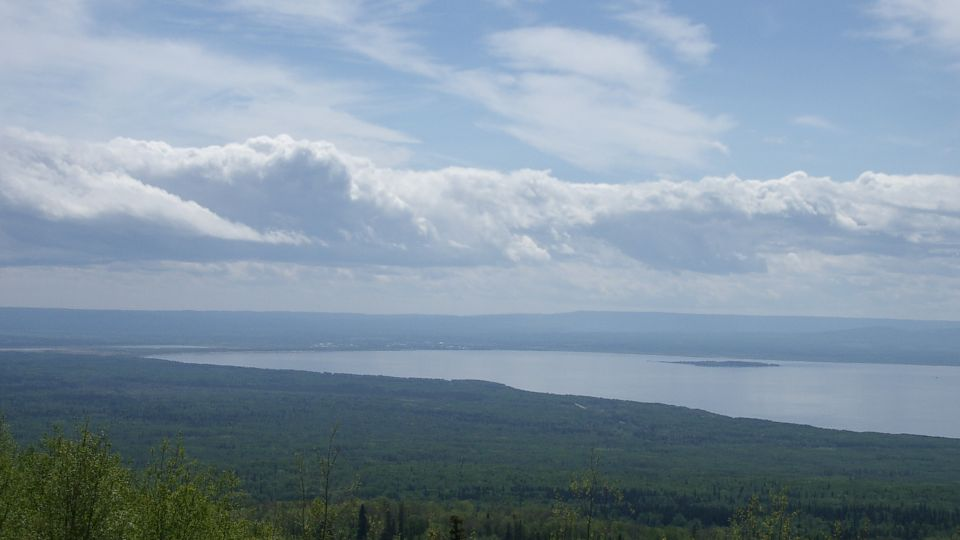
Lesser Slave Lake

=== Saskatchewan ===
Saskatchewan (SK) has six travel corridors of which the Northern Woods and Water Route is the most northernly. The NWWR begins its journey in north western SK on Highway 55, which crosses 670.9 km (416.9 mi) of northern Saskatchewan. Pierceland, a small hamlet of the Beaver River No. 622 rural municipality (RM), is at the junction of Highway 55, Highway 950 north and Highway 21 south where traffic volume is around 1,000 vpd. The unincorporated area of Peerless, is at the junction of Highway 55 and Highway 26 which bears a traffic volume between 600 and 700 vpd.

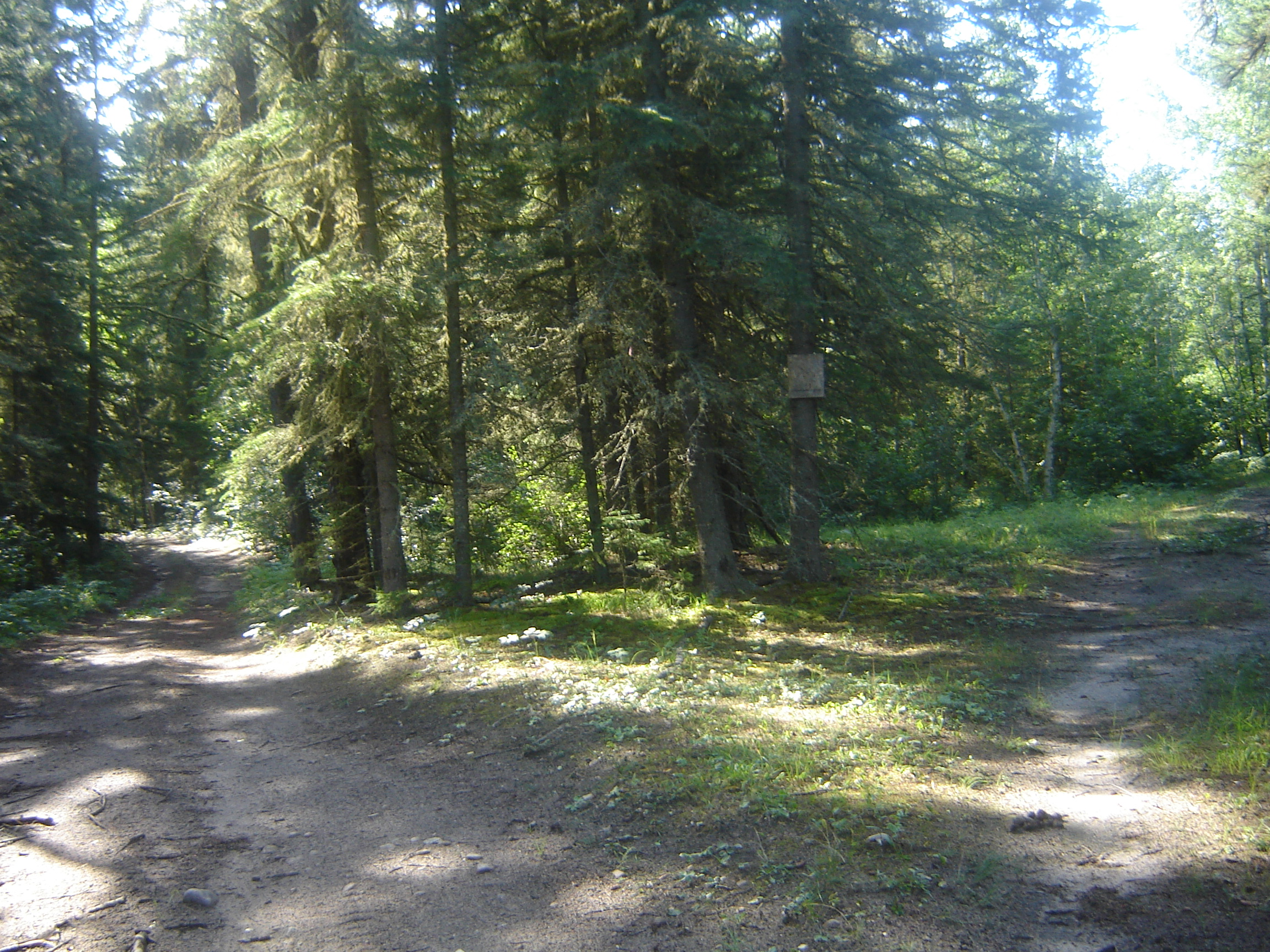
Meadow Lake Provincial Park

Goodsoil, the approximate halfway point of the NWWR is on Highway 26 6.2 km (3.9 mi) north of the NWWR en route to the Meadow Lake Provincial Park. Rapid View is an unincorporated area of the RM of Meadow Lake No. 588 RM. The town of Meadow Lake is on the north-western shore of Meadow Lake where the AADT is approximately 1,700 to 2,500 vpd. Green Lake, at the intersection of Highway 55 and Highway 155, is at the northern tip of Green Lake. Traffic volume is considerably higher west of Green River at about 900 vpd dropping to about 350 to the east. Between Green Lake and Shellbrook, the NWWR bears south east skirting around the western edge of the Prince Albert National Park. The NWWR follows the eastern shoreline of Cowan Lake until the southern tip at Big River which is just west of Delaronde Lake, and the highway volume at this point is about 1,000 vpd. Big River No. 555 RM provides civic administration to Bodmin. Debden, a village of about 350, is at the Highway 55 and Highway 793 junction where traffic volume is about 850 vpd to the north and around 1,200 vpd to the south of the intersection. Polwarth, at the Highway 55 and Highway 793 south junction, is a hamlet of Canwood No. 494 RM. The village of Canwood, population of about 350, is located between Polwarth and the town of Shellbrook. Shellbrook is at the intersection of Highway 55 and Highway 240 where the AADT increases to about 2,000 vpd. At Shellbrook, the 42.5 km (26.4 mi) concurrency with Highway 3 begins and the multiplex ends in Prince Albert. Crutwell, a hamlet of Shellbrook No. 493 RM, is located south of the NWWR, and north of the North Saskatchewan River. On the NWWR, at Crutwell, the traffic volume rises to about 3,100. As the highway approaches the city of Prince Albert Highway 55 has its only divided segment, for nearly 9 km leading into a junction with Highway 3 and Highway 2. Traffic volume west of the city is about 4200 vpd, whereas east of the city the AADT drops to approximately 2,090 vpd. Prince Albert, on the North Saskatchewan River, is within 89.8 km (55.8 mi) of the Prince Albert National Park.

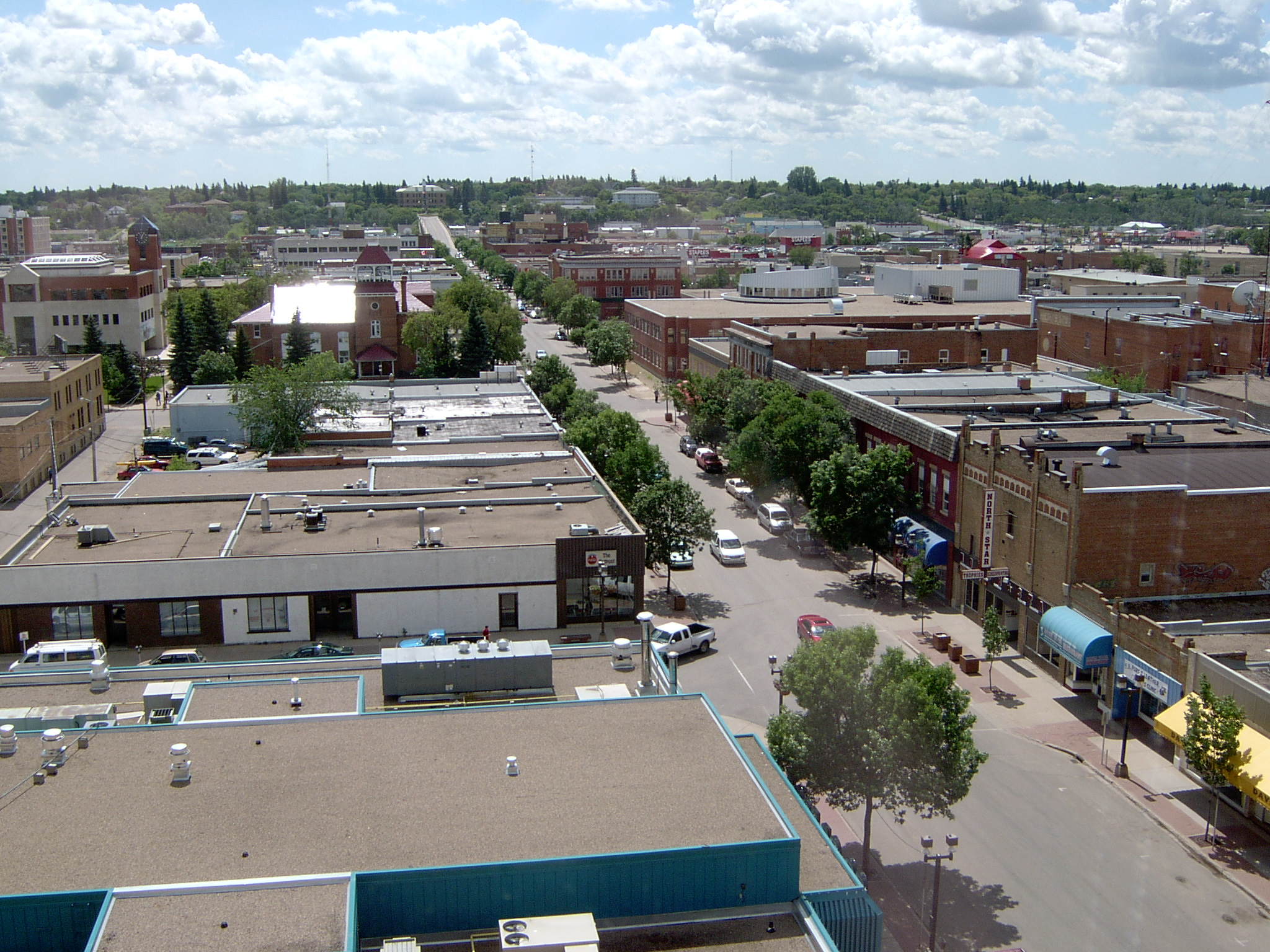
Prince Albert

Meath Park is a village of about 200 at the junction of Highway 55, Highway 355 and Highway 120 where the traffic volume is heaviest west towards Prince Albert at about 2,000 vpd, and the AADT trickles down to 1,000 vpd east of Meath Park. The NWWR is in the Boreal transition ecoregion which features agricultural fields on the parkland mixed with dense taiga and sparse population. Over the next 37.5 km (23.3 mi) there are three small unincorporated areas with populations less than 100; Weirdale is found in the Garden River No. 490 RM; Foxford in Paddockwood No. 520, RM; and Shipman of Torch River No. 488 RM. At the Highway 55 and Highway 255 junction is the village of Smeaton, and at the Highway 55 and Highway 691 junction is the hamlet of Snowden. Choiceland is 1 km (0.62 mi) north of the Highway 55 and the Highway 6 national highway intersection. Garrick is a part of Torch River No. 488 RM and Love, a village of around 60, marks a turn south east for the NWWR. White Fox, a village of about 375 is near the Highway 55 and Highway 35 intersection where the traffic volume raises to 1,700 vpd. At the intersection, the NWWR turns south and a 12 km (7.5 mi) concurrency begins until the town of Nipawin. Nipawin on the Saskatchewan River, and near both Tobin Lake and Codette Lake is home to the Northern Woods and Water Route Association. East of Nipawin until the Highway 23 intersection the traffic volume remain around 1,300 vpd and following the intersection to the east the traffic falls to about 400 vpd. There are no communities along the Highway 9 route which contributes 40 km (25 mi) to the entire NWWR. At the junction between Highway 55 and Highway 9, the AADT is less than 100 vpd.

=== Manitoba ===
Travel along the NWWR enters Manitoba via the MB PR 283 west ending at The Pas, a town of about 5,500 where the AADT increases to 980 vpd. MB PR 283 provides 38.6 km (24.0 mi) of the NWWR where the economy has been supported by the fur trade, trapping, mining, fishing, logging and agricultural industries. The Pas, which has not yet incorporated as a city (requisite population of 5,000), is located south of the Saskatchewan River and south of the Clearwater Lake Provincial Park and Cormorant Provincial Forest.

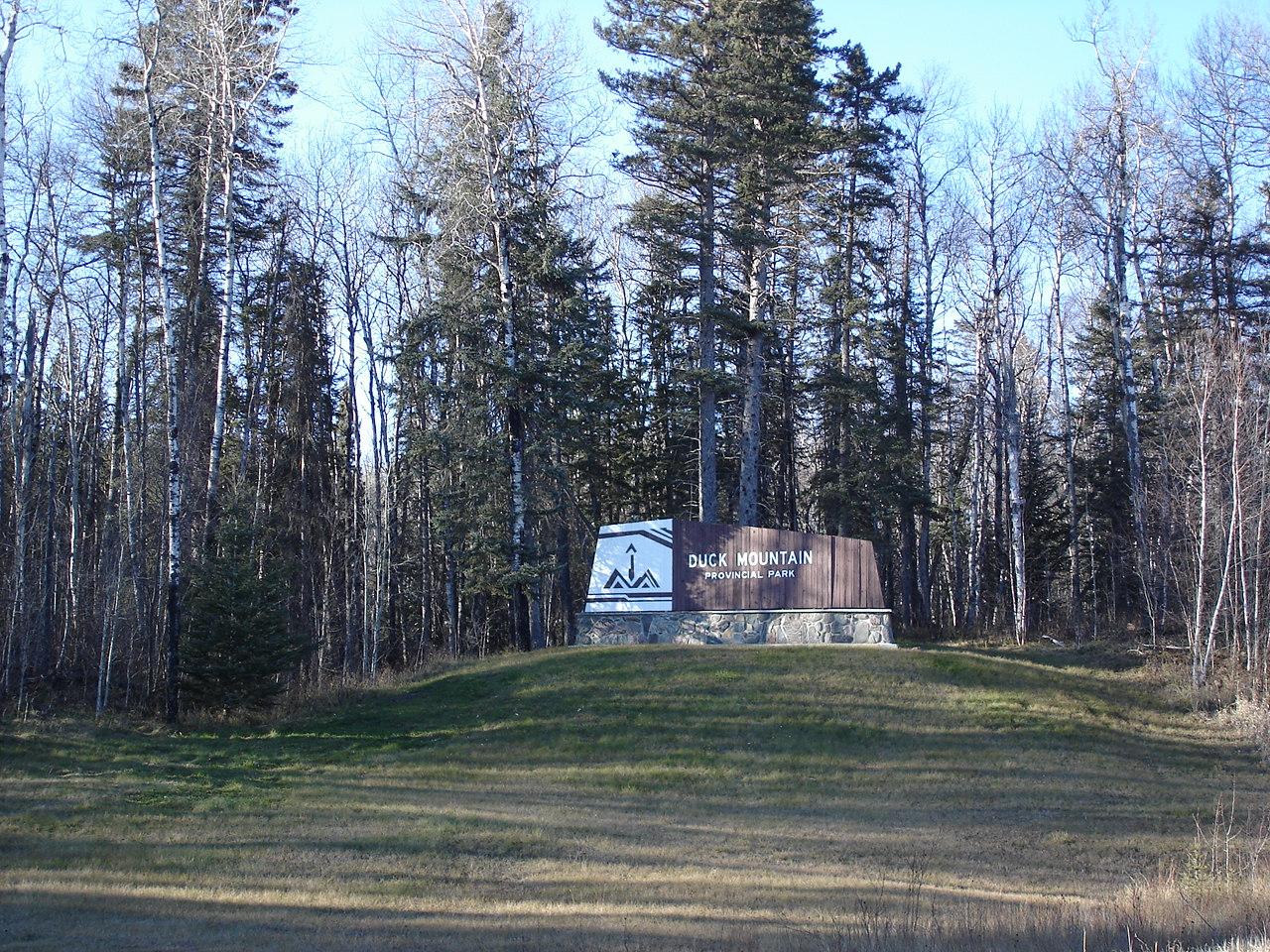
Duck Mountain Provincial Park

Travel along the NWWR out of The Pas continues south along MB PTH 10 and continues on MB PTH 10 for 411.6 km (255.8 mi). Pasquia River flows through The Pas, and travels west of the NWWR until it turns west to Saskatchewan near Westray. Freshford and Westray are both within the R.M. of Kelsey. Overflowing River, a small community with less than 100 residents is a part of the Unorganized Division No. 21. Overflowing River community is on the Overflowing River and at the north-west tip of Dawson Bay of Lake Winnipegosis whereas Makefing is east of the Porcupine Provincial Forest. Bellsite, Novra, and Birch River are all small unorganised areas of Mountain (North) RM located west of Swan Lake. Bowsman with a population of over 300, is the next largest village along the NWWR after The Pas.

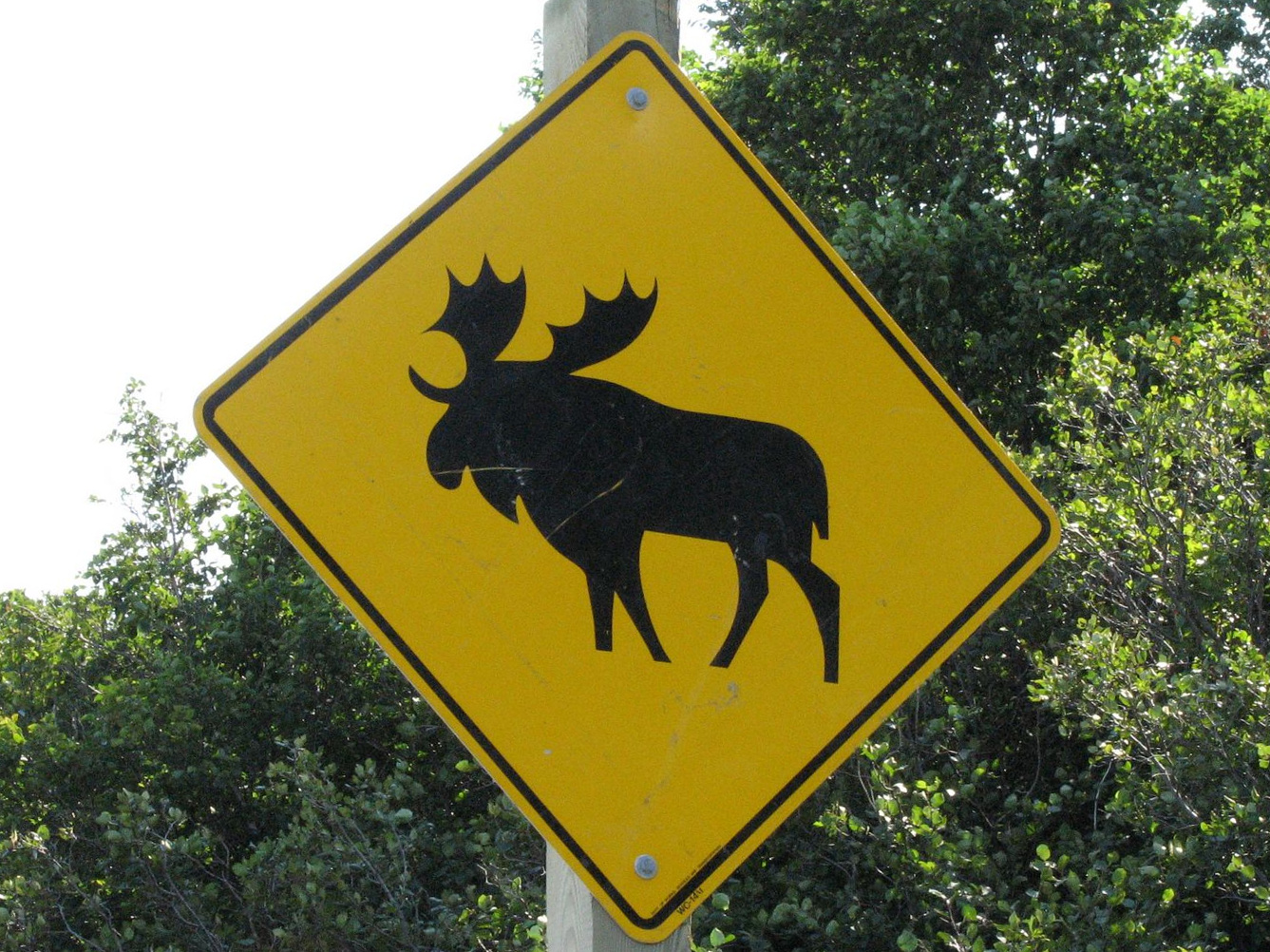
Moose Crossing sign on MB PTH 10

Swan River, in the Swan River valley, is between the Duck Mountains and Porcupine Mountains. North of Swan River, the AADT increases to about 2,000 vpd and the NWWR changes course at Swan River and bears east. Minitonas is on the Favel River and at the junction of MB PTH 10 and MB PR 366 south. West of MB PTH 10 and MB PR 268 north intersection, traffic volume is over 1,100 vpd, and east of MB PR 268 traffic declines to about 750 vpd. Renwer is a small community found in the Minitonas RM. The MB PTH 10 and MB PTH 20 intersection is at the hamlet of Cowan in Mountain (South) RM and here the NWWR resumes its route south. Sclater and Pine River two places with populations less than 100 are also found in Mountain (South) RM. The NWWR is to the east of Duck Mountain Provincial Park and Duck Mountain Provincial Forest and west of Lake Winnipegosis. Garland is at the intersection of MB PR 489 east, MB PR 367 west, MB PTH 10A and MB PTH 10. Ethelbert, a small hamlet of the R.M. of Ethelbert, is at the intersection of MB PR 269 west, MB PR 274 south and MB PTH 10. The AADT along MB PTH 10 declines to about 680 vpd near this intersection.

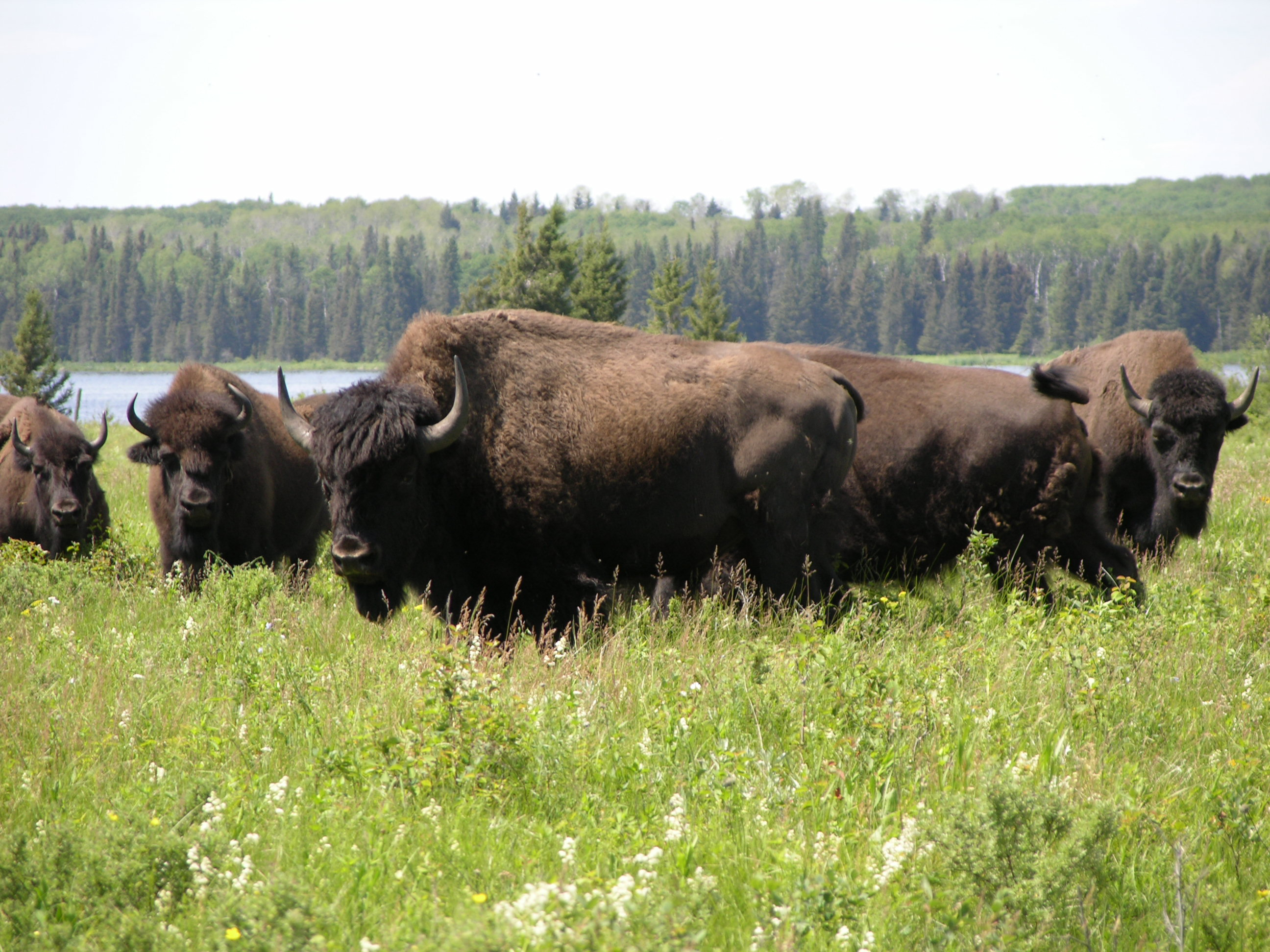
Riding Mountain National Park

Ashville is located north of the MB PTH 10 and MB PTH 5 junction in this parkland area of R.M. of Gilbert Plains. The NWWR continues east along the MB PTH 5, using this connector route for a total of 40 km (25 mi). The city of Dauphin is located north of Riding Mountain National Park and south of Dauphin Lake. Near this city, the traffic volume jumps to 2,750 vpd, with the heaviest day of the week being Friday, and the highest volume occurring between April and October during daylight hours. Ochre River is at the junction of MB PTH 10 and MB PR 582 south of Rainbow Beach Provincial Park. Ste. Rose du Lac, a town of about 1,000, is at the intersection of MB PTH 5, MB PTH 68 and MB PR 276. Near this intersection, the traffic volume declines to around 1,800 vpd. At Ste. Rose du Lac, cattle capital of Manitoba, the NWWR continues west on MB PTH 68 and this connector highway will carry the NWWR for 128.2 km (79.7 mi). Shergrove is located close to the turn off north from the easterly direction of MB PTH 68. Ebb and Flow Lake is east of Eddystone which is part of R.M. of Alonsa. Wapah, another small community, is between Ebb and Flow Lake, and Lake Manitoba. R.M. of Siglunes administrates civic affairs for Vogar which is south of Dog Lake. At Vogar the NWWR returns to an east direction. At Mulvihill the NWWR turns south and the 10.4 km (6.5 mi) concurrency between MB PTH 68 and MB PTH 6 begins.

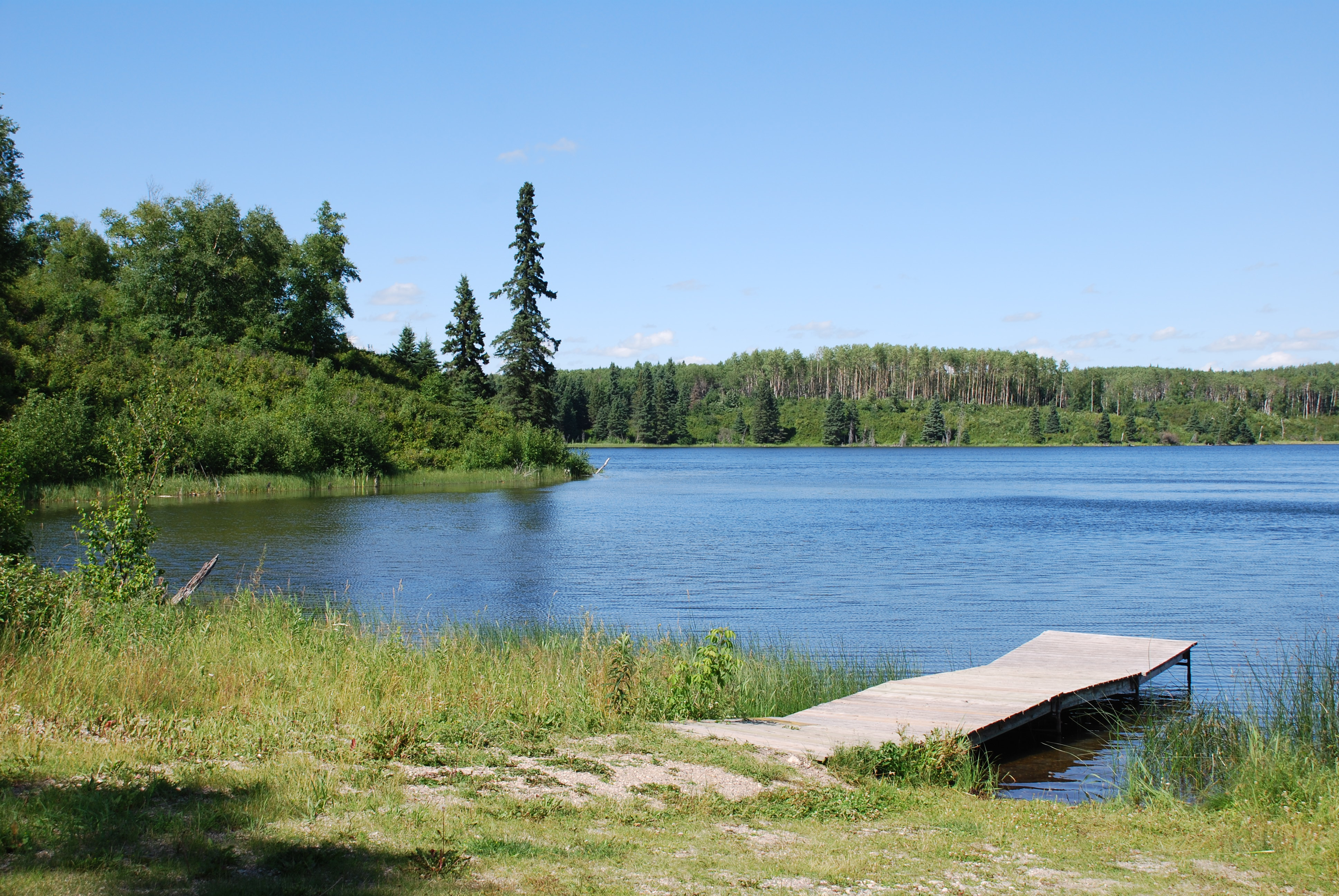
Riding Mountain National Park

At Eriksdale, MB PTH 68 turns east and the concurrency between MB PTH 68 and MB PTH 6 ends, however the NWWR continues on MB PTH 6 in a southerly direction for the final 135.6 km (84.3 mi) leg of the travel corridor. Deerhorn is found in the R.M. of Eriksdale. The NWWR continues south along PTH 6 and parallel to the eastern shores of Lake Manitoba. Lundar and Clarkleigh are both in R.M. of Coldwell. The unincorporated area of Lundar is at the intersection of MB PR 418 east, PTH 6, and MB PR 419. MB PR 419 west provides access to the Lundar Beach Provincial Park. The hamlet of Clarkleigh is at the intersection of MB PTH 6, and MB PR 229 east. Oakpoint is at the intersection of MB PTH 6, and MB PR 419, and St. Laurent is at MB PTH 6 and MB PR 415.

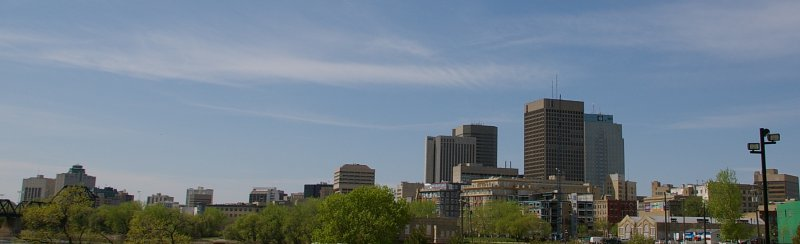
Winnipeg, Manitoba

The hamlet of Lake Francis is located west of West Shoal Lake. Both Woodlands and Warren are unincorporated areas with small populations below 100 of R.M. of Woodlands. The AADT along the NWWR increases to over 2,500 vpd near these communities. Woodlands is at the intersection of PTH 6 and MB PR 518 and Warren is at MB PTH 67 and MB PTH 6. Grosse Isle is the last hamlet along NWWR before arriving at Perimeter Highway, the PTH 101 around Winnipeg, the ending terminus of the NWWR.

== History ==
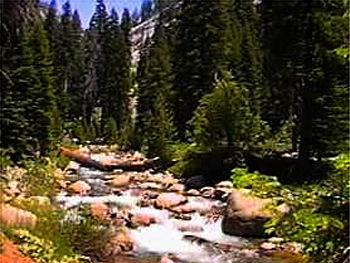
Boreal forest

The Long Trail followed the Peace River 100 miles (160 km) across northern AB. As the flow of traffic increased due to the fur trade industry along the Long Trail, stopping places developed providing rest and food for travelers. In 1923, the three routes out of Lac La Biche were to the west, which corresponds to the route of Highway 55 along the south shores of Lesser Slave Lake. Edmonton or Saddle Lake trail departed to the south, which would be the initial stages of Highway 55 out of Lac La Biche. Heart Lake trail traveled northeast from Lac La Biche, which would form a base for secondary Highway 858. Work was done on the Athabaska Trail to make it passable for motor traffic as many roads had been graded. Before stopping places developed, caches were set up at stopping points along the way. Before the arrival of rails the waterways such as the Lesser Slave Lake near Athabasca, Alberta and the Saskatchewan River near Prince Albert were traversed by long boat, canoe, and steamship. The rail did not reach the northern areas until the early twentieth century due to the geological hurdles of mountains, muskeg, swamp, boreal forest, and river systems to traverse. A huge flood in 1899 near The Pas left no ground to walk upon, yet the railway track construction work began in 1906, with more continuing in 1911. In 1928, the Canadian Pacific Railway (CPR) surveyed their line across the Saskatchewan River near Prince Albert, and contractors started work on the bridge. The upper deck served the train, and the lower deck was built for highway traffic opening for vehicles in 1932. In 1929, travel was overland on trails, and rivers were forded in many places.

As early as 1896 oil wells were drilled at Athabasca supplementing the rich soils and grain growing economy. There was a rush of settlers to the area in the early 20th century, at this time transportation for goods was freighted on Lesser Slave Lake to connecting river routes or via early rail lines overland. Fortune seekers during the gold rush of 1896 traveled north through Edmonton or took the rail as far north as Prince Albert. The westerly route proceeded from Prince Albert to Green Lake, and from there to the Long Trail by following the Beaver River to the Churchill River, Athabaska, Slave and Mackenzie rivers until bearing north following the rivers of the Yukon to Dawson City.

The first garage to service McLaughlin cars opened in High River as early as 1909. In 1912 travelers could stop here at a filling station for their automobiles. This same year the speed limit through town was not over ten miles per hour (16 km/h) and not over five miles per hour (8 km/h) upon approaching another horse or pedestrian, the fine was not more than CA$50.00. (Note: CA$50,00 from 1912 is equivalent to $1,700 in present day terms.) The Pas, Manitoba saw its first car arrive in 1916, yet it had been active with fur trading posts and explorers in the area since 1741.

Settlers would not only haul gravel for the new roadways, but they also cleared brush for the road allowance. Early roads did not follow the road allowances of the Dominion Land Survey, but rather kept to higher ground, however due to the nature of the Boreal transition ecoregion, muskegs and swamps still needed to be traversed. The first pioneers filled these watery areas with branches and brush and proceeded along their trip. Later corduroy roads were built across these areas were traffic got mired in the mud. A corduroy road consisted of logs laid across the road as a rail tie is across the rail line, however the logs were placed one against another and mud filled between the logs for a smoother surface. One log provided about 6 inches (15 cm) of roadway, so only the worst areas were constructed in this fashion.

Debden, Saskatchewan, had a horse and caboose taxi for settlers as early as 1912 providing regular trips to Prince Albert and taking children to school. In 1945, the taxi service was provided by automobile. Bush planes arrived in the 1920s to the northern bus areas providing communication in an era where travel was limited when the snow fell, or the water froze. In 1968, High Prairie was looking forward to hard surface construction for Highway 2 which would supplement the economic trading base with tourism. A new bridge across the Saskatchewan River at Prince Albert was erected in 1974, and caused re-routing of the highway by one and a half miles (2.4 km). Community groups came together as early as the 1950s to establish a northern travel route.

The early name proposed for these travel corridor was the Northern Yellowhead Transportation Route. The Northern Woods and Water Route Association was established in 1974, their further promotion of the route was to increase tourist travel. George R. Stephenson (1916–2003), of McLennan was one of the first facilitators to organise the Northern Woods and Water Route across Western Canada in 1974. Henry Andres was chairman of the Northern Woods and Water Association for eight years wherein the association worked on placing NWWR signs both on provincial highways and maps. Brochures promoting tourism were printed, and the association sponsored more than five cavalcades where wagons would traverse the route between Winnipeg and Dawson Creek promoting tourism and the creation of the travel corridor. On August 21, 1975, one of these Northern Woods and Water Cavalcades stopped at Nipawin Regional Park and toured Nipawin.

Current engineering concerns would be to determine maintenance of the current travel corridor and construction upgrades. The route does contain a variety of road surfaces ranging from asphalt concrete, thin membrane surface (TMS), granular pavements and gravel highway. Insight into current surface texture, traffic volume, traffic speed, percentage of loaded trucks, climate variations, construction costs and time as well as available materials will affect upgrade procedures. The entire route is paved except for a Class 4 gravel highway segment between Nipawin and the Manitoba border. Here the traffic volume declines to 80 and 85 vpd and two checkpoints near the Manitoba border.

== Major intersections ==
Province	Location	km	mi	Destinations	Notes
British Columbia	Dawson Creek	0.0	0.0	Highway 2 to Highway 97 – Grande Prairie, Edmonton, Prince George, Fort St. John	NWWR follows Hwy 49
British Columbia – Alberta border		15.4	9.6	Highway 49 eastern terminus; Highway 49 western terminus	
Alberta	Rycroft	103.8	64.5	Highway 2 south – Grande Prairie; Highway 49 east – Donnelly	NWWR follows Hwy 2 north; alternate route via Hwy 49 east
Alberta	Dunvegan	124.0	77.1	Dunvegan Bridge crosses the Peace River	
Alberta		137.9	85.7	Highway 64 west – Hines Creek, Fort St. John	
Alberta	Fairview	149.6	93.0	Highway 64A west – Hines Creek, Fort St. John	
Alberta	Grimshaw	207.4	128.9	Highway 2A east – Peace River (alternate route)	
Alberta		212.0	131.7	Highway 35 north (Mackenzie Highway) – High Level	
Alberta		220.2	136.8	Highway 2A west – Grimshaw (alternate route)	
Alberta	Peace River	231.1	143.6	Peace River Bridge crosses the Peace River	
Alberta	Donnelly	294.3	182.9	Highway 49 – Valleyview, Falher, Rycroft	NWWR alternate route via Hwy 49 west
Alberta	near High Prairie	343.6	213.5	Highway 2A west – Valleyview	
Alberta	near Kinuso	432.6	268.8	Highway 33 south – Swan Hills	
Alberta	Slave Lake	475.3	295.3	Highway 88 north (Bicentennial Highway) – Fort Vermilion	
Alberta		527.0	327.5	Crosses the Athabasca River	
Alberta		530.2	329.5	Highway 2A north – Smith	
Alberta		533.4	331.4	Highway 44 south – Westlock, Edmonton	
Alberta	Athabasca	605.6	376.3	Highway 55 east / Highway 2 south – Clyde, Edmonton	NWWR follows Hwy 55 east
Alberta		637.1	395.9	Highway 63 south – Boyle, Edmonton	West end of Hwy 55 / Hwy 63 concurrency
Alberta		659.9	410.0	Highway 63 north – Fort McMurray	East end of Hwy 55 / Hwy 63 concurrency
Alberta	Lac La Biche	701.5	435.9	Highway 881 north – Fort McMurray	West end of Hwy 55 / Hwy 36 concurrency
Alberta		719.3	447.0	Highway 36 south – Ashmont, Two Hills	East end of Hwy 55 / Hwy 36 concurrency
Alberta	La Corey	807.8	501.9	Highway 41 south – Bonnyville	
Alberta	Cold Lake	844.6	524.8	Highway 28 east – Cold Lake (lake)	West end of Hwy 55 / Hwy 28 concurrency
Alberta		854.7	531.1	Highway 28 west – Bonnyville, Edmonton	East end of Hwy 55 / Hwy 28 concurrency
Alberta – Saskatchewan border		868.3	539.5	Highway 55 eastern terminus; Highway 55 western terminus	
Saskatchewan	Pierceland	883.9	549.2	Highway 21 – Meadow Lake Provincial Park, Paradise Hill	
Saskatchewan	near Goodsoil	920.2	571.8	Highway 26 – Meadow Lake Provincial Park	West end of Hwy 55 / Hwy 26 concurrency
Saskatchewan	near Goodsoil	921.6	572.7	Highway 26 south – St. Walburg	East end of Hwy 55 / Hwy 26 concurrency
Saskatchewan		979.3	608.5	Highway 4 north – Meadow Lake Provincial Park	West end of Hwy 55 / Hwy 4 concurrency
Saskatchewan	Meadow Lake	989.2	614.7	Highway 4 south – The Battlefords	East end of Hwy 55 / Hwy 4 concurrency
Saskatchewan	Green Lake	1,038.6	645.4	Highway 155 north – La Loche	
Saskatchewan	Shellbrook	1,202.3	747.1	Highway 3 west to Highway 40 – Spiritwood, The Battlefords	West end of Hwy 55 / Hwy 3 concurrency
Saskatchewan	Prince Albert	1,244.5	773.3	Highway 2 / Highway 3 east – Prince Albert National Park, La Ronge, Melfort, Saskatoon	East end of Hwy 55 / Hwy 3 concurrency
Saskatchewan	Meath Park	1,286.6	799.5	Highway 120 north – Creighton	
Saskatchewan	Smeaton	1,323.0	822.1	Highway 106 north (Hansen Lake Road) – Creighton, Flin Flon	Alternate route via Hwy 106 north
Saskatchewan	Choiceland	1,344.2	835.2	Highway 6 south – Melfort, Regina	
Saskatchewan	White Fox	1,373.3	853.3	Highway 35 north – Tobin Lake (west/north shores)	West end of Hwy 55 / Hwy 35 concurrency
Saskatchewan		1,381.1	858.2	Nipawin Bridge crosses the Saskatchewan River	
Saskatchewan	Nipawin	1,385.2	860.7	Highway 35 south – Tisdale	East end of Hwy 55 / Hwy 35 concurrency
Saskatchewan		1,413.4	878.2	Highway 23 south – Carrot River	
Saskatchewan		1,414.0	878.6	Highway 123 north – Cumberland House	
Saskatchewan		1,518.4	943.5	Highway 9 south – Hudson Bay	Hwy 55 eastern terminus; NWWR follows Hwy 9 east
Saskatchewan – Manitoba border		1,558.3	968.3	Highway 9 eastern terminus; PR 283 western terminus	
Manitoba	The Pas	1,597.8	992.8	PTH 10 north – Flin Flon	PR 283 eastern terminus; NWWR follows PTH 10 south; alternate route via PTH 10 north
Manitoba		1,671.3	1,038.5	PTH 60 east – Easterville, Grand Rapids	
Manitoba		1,750.2	1,087.5	PTH 77 west – Barrows, Hudson Bay	
Manitoba		1,823.2	1,132.9	PTH 10A south – Swan River	
Manitoba	Swan River	1,825.6	1,134.4	PTH 83 south – Roblin; PTH 10A north / PTH 83A south (Main Street E)	
Manitoba	Cowan	1,873.4	1,164.1	PTH 20 / PTH 10 south – Dauphin	PTH 20 northern terminus; NWWR follows PTH 20 south; alternate route via PTH 10 south
Manitoba	near Winnipegosis	1,973.6	1,226.3	PR 269 west – Ethelbert	Alternate route via PR 269 west
Manitoba	Dauphin	2,016.2	1,252.8	PTH 20A south (River Avenue E)	
Manitoba	Dauphin	2,017.8	1,253.8	PTH 20A north (1st Avenue NE)	
Manitoba	Ochre River	2,042.4	1,269.1	PTH 5 west – Dauphin	PTH 20 southern terminus; NWWR follows PTH 5 east
Manitoba	Ste. Rose du Lac	2,061.9	1,281.2	PTH 68 / PTH 5 south – Neepawa	PTH 68 western terminus; NWRR follows PTH 68 east
Manitoba	The Narrows	2,130.3	1,323.7	Crosses Lake Manitoba	
Manitoba		2,188.7	1,360.0	PTH 6 north – Ashern, Thompson	North end of PTH 6 / PTH 68 concurrency
Manitoba	Eriksdale	2,199.3	1,366.6	PTH 68 east – Arborg	South end of PTH 6 / PTH 68 concurrency; NWRR follows PTH 6 south
Manitoba	Warren	2,299.0	1,428.5	PTH 67 east – Stonewall	
Manitoba	Winnipeg	2,321.3	1,442.4	PTH 101 (Perimeter Highway)	
1.000 mi = 1.609 km; 1.000 km = 0.621 mi: Concurrency terminus; Route transition
