= Manitoba Highway 20 =

Provincial highway in Manitoba, Canada

Provincial Trunk Highway 20
- Northern Woods and Water Route
- PTH 20 highlighted in red

Route information
- Maintained by Manitoba Infrastructure
- Length: 169 km (105 mi)
- Existed: 1948–present

Major junctions
- South end: PTH 5 / PR 582 near Ochre River
- PTH 20A at Dauphin
- North end: PTH 10 at Cowan

Location
- Country: Canada
- Province: Manitoba
- Rural municipalities: Dauphin; Lakeshore; Mossey River; Mountain
- Major cities: Dauphin

Highway system
- Provincial highways in Manitoba; Winnipeg City Routes
← PTH 19	→ PTH 20A

Provincial Trunk Highway 20 (PTH 20) is a provincial highway in the Canadian province of Manitoba. It runs from PTH 5 and PR 582 just south of Ochre River to PTH 10 in the village of Cowan. The highway provides an eastern alternative access option to Dauphin along with PTH 20A.

The speed limit is 90 km/h (55 mph). PTH 20 is part of the Northern Woods and Water Route.

== Route description ==
PTH 20 begins by travelling for 8 kilometres (5.0 mi) north through Ochre River to the southwestern edge of Dauphin Lake before turning west toward Dauphin. It then turns north at the Dauphin city limits (PTH 20A actually enters Dauphin) to provide access to the western shores of Dauphin Lake and Lake Winnipegosis. Along this stretch, PTH 20 passes through the town of Winnipegosis. The highway continues north to the village of Camperville, where it turns west. The highway meets PR 272 approximately one kilometre later.

From this point, PTH 20 travels in an east–west direction while maintaining its designation as a north-south highway. It skirts the southern boundary of the Swan-Pelican Provincial Forest before reaching its northern terminus with PTH 10 at Cowan.

== History ==
Highway 20 was originally designated in 1928 from PTH 2 east of Carroll to Boissevain. This became part of PTH 25 in 1929 (which became part of PTH 10 in 1939).

When the current version of PTH 20 first appeared on the 1948–49 Manitoba Highway Map, it was originally a short north–south highway spanning 54 kilometres (34 mi) that connected PTH 5 just east of Dauphin to Winnipegosis.

The highway was extended to Camperville in 1957, and completed to its current northbound terminus at Cowan in 1959.

The segment of the highway between Dauphin and its current southern terminus was originally part of PTH 5 before its current section between Ochre River and PTH 10 south was constructed and opened to traffic in 1959. PTH 20 was then extended along the old section of PTH 5 at that point, with a small spur between the original southern terminus and Dauphin's city centre being redesignated as PTH 20A.

== Major intersections ==
Division	Location	km	mi	Destinations	Notes
Lakeshore	Ochre River	0.0	0.0	PTH 5 (Parks Route / NWWR east) – Dauphin, Ste. Rose du Lac; PR 582 south – Makinak	NWRR follows PTH 5 east; road continues south as PR 582
Lakeshore	Ochre River	1.4	0.87	Bridge over the Ochre River	
Lakeshore	Ochre Beach	8.6	5.3	Beach Road – Ochre Beach	
Lakeshore	Rainbow Beach Provincial Park	9.9	6.2	Bridge over Rainbow Creek	
Lakeshore	Rainbow Beach Provincial Park	10.2	6.3	Rainbow Beach Provincial Park	Access road into park
Lakeshore		10.8	6.7	Bridge over Rainbow Creek Drain	
Lakeshore	Dauphin Beach	12.3	7.6	Bond Street – Dauphin Beach	
Dauphin		18.3	11.4	Bridge over Edwards Creek	
City of Dauphin		24.6	15.3	PTH 20A north (1st Avenue NE)	Former PTH 5 west
City of Dauphin		26.2	16.3	PTH 20A south (River Avenue E)	
Dauphin		29.8	18.5	Bridge over the Vermillion River	
Dauphin		32.3	20.1	Bridge over the Wilson River	
Dauphin		40.3	25.0	Bridge over the Valley River	
Dauphin		49.2	30.6	PR 267 west – Sifton	
Dauphin		56.8	35.3	Bridge over Mink Creek	
Mossey River		58.6	36.4	Road 168 North	Former PR 273 west
Mossey River		59.1	36.7	Bridge over the Fishing River	
Mossey River	Fork River	65.4	40.6	PR 269 east – Rorketon	South end of PR 269 overlap
Mossey River	Fork River	65.5	40.7	Bridge over the Fork River	
Mossey River		68.8	42.8	PR 269 west (NWRR) – Ethelbert	North end of PR 269 overlap; alternate route of NWRR
Mossey River	Winnipegosis	79.6	49.5	PR 364 south – Rorketon	
Mountain		108.3	67.3	PR 271 west – Pine River	
Mountain		121.9	75.7	Bridge over the Point River	
Mountain		124.6	77.4	PR 489 south	
No. 19	Camperville	132.0	82.0	Bridge over the Pine River	
No. 19	Camperville	132.4	82.3	PR 272 north – Duck Bay	
Mountain		137.3	85.3	Bridge over the Sclater River	
Mountain	Cowan	169.0	105.0	PTH 10 – Dauphin, Swan River	NWRR follows PTH 10 north; NWWR alternate route follow PTH 10 south
1.000 mi = 1.609 km; 1.000 km = 0.621 mi: Concurrency terminus

== Related routes ==
=== Provincial Trunk Highway 20A ===
Provincial Trunk Highway 20A
- Location: Dauphin
- Length: 5.3 km (3.3 mi)
- Existed: 1966–present

Provincial Trunk Highway 20A (PTH 20A) is a 5.3-kilometre-long (3.3 mi) alternate route of PTH 20 that provides access to the city centre of Dauphin

=== Provincial Road 272 ===
Provincial Route 272
- Location: Duck Bay
- Length: 21 km (13 mi)
- Existed: 1966–present

Provincial Road 272 (PR 272) is a 21-kilometre-long (13 mi) north-south spur of PTH 20, serving as the only road access to the hamlet of Duck Bay, located on the shores of Lake Winnipegosis.

=== Provincial Road 489 ===
Provincial Road 489
- Location: Pulp River - Camperville
- Length: 22.6 km (14.0 mi)
- Existed: 1966–present

Provincial Road 489 (PR 489) is a 22.6-kilometre-long (14.0 mi) north–south spur of PTH 20 in the Rural Municipality of Mountain, providing access to the hamlet of Pulp River as well as the locality of Duck River. It is entirely a gravel two-lane road, while also paralleling the Garland River for the majority of its length.

Prior to 1992, PR 489 continued 27.4 kilometres (17.0 mi) further south along what is now Garland Road to the hamlet of Garland, where it ended at an intersection with PTH 10. This is still labelled as PR 489 on some maps.

Division	Location	km	mi	Destinations	Notes
Mountain	Pulp River	0.0	0.0	PR 271 – Winnipegosis, Pine River; Garland Road – Garland	Southern terminus; road continues south as Garland Road (former PR 489 south)
Mountain		7.5	4.7	Bridge over the Garland River	
Mountain	Duck River	15.1	9.4	Bridge over the Garland River	
Mountain		22.6	14.0	PTH 20 (NWWR East Branch) – Camperville, Winnipegosis	Northern terminus
1.000 mi = 1.609 km; 1.000 km = 0.621 mi

=== Provincial Road 582 ===
Provincial Road 582
- Road 134N, Road 99W
- Location: Makinak - Ochre River
- Length: 16.4 km (10.2 mi)
- Existed: 1966–present

Provincial Road 582 (PR 582) is a 16.4-kilometre-long (10.2 mi) southern continuation of PTH 20 in the Rural Municipality of Lakeshore, providing access to the hamlet Makinak. It is entirely a two-lane gravel road, and includes two crossings of the Ochre River.

Division	Location	km	mi	Destinations	Notes
Lakeshore	Makinak	0.0	0.0	PR 480 – Makinak, Laurier	Southern terminus; road continues west as Road 134N
Lakeshore		8.0	5.0	Bridge over the Ochre River	
Lakeshore		12.8	8.0	Bridge over the Ochre River	
Lakeshore	Ochre River	16.4	10.2	PTH 5 (Parks Route / NWWR east) – Dauphin, Ste. Rose du Lac; PTH 20 north (NWWR west) – Ochre River	Northern terminus; southern terminus of PTH 20; road continues north as PTH 20 northbound
1.000 mi = 1.609 km; 1.000 km = 0.621 mi
