= Manitoba Provincial Road 418 =

Provincial Road in Manitoba, Canada

Provincial Road 418
- Road 33W, Broadway
- PR 418 highlighted in red

Route information
- Maintained by Department of Infrastructure
- Length: 14.7 km (9.1 mi)
- Existed: 1966–present

Major junctions
- South end: PR 419 near Lundar Beach Provincial Park
- North end: PR 417 near Eriksdale

Location
- Country: Canada
- Province: Manitoba
- Rural municipalities: Coldwell, West Interlake

Highway system
- Provincial highways in Manitoba; Winnipeg City Routes
← PR 417	→ PR 419

Provincial Road 418 (PR 418) is a short 14.7-kilometre-long (9.1 mi) north–south highway in the Interlake Region of Manitoba, running from PR 419 just east of Lundar Beach Provincial Park, through the hamlet of Lily Bay, to a junction with PR 417 west of the town of Eriksdale. It is entirely a two-lane gravel road running along Road 33W, with the portion within the Rural Municipality of West Interlake being known as Broadway.

== History ==
Prior to 1992, PR 418 continued 17.5 kilometres (10.9 mi) further north, via a concurrency with PR 417 westbound, along with what is now Clydebank Road (Road 35W) and Old 418, to an intersection with PTH 68 (Northern Woods and Water Route, known as PR 235 prior to 1987).

== Major intersections ==
Division	Location	km	mi	Destinations	Notes
Coldwell		0.0	0.0	PR 419 – Lundar, Lundar Beach	Southern terminus
West Interlake		14.7	9.1	PR 417 – Dog Creek, Eriksdale	Northern terminus; road continues north as Broadway (Road 33W)
1.000 mi = 1.609 km; 1.000 km = 0.621 mi
