= Manitoba Provincial Road 419 =

Provincial Road in Manitoba, Canada

Provincial Road 419
- PR 419 highlighted in red

Route information
- Maintained by Department of Infrastructure
- Length: 62.0 km (38.5 mi)
- Existed: 1966–present

Major junctions
- West end: Lundar Beach Provincial Park
- PTH 6 in Lundar
- East end: PTH 17 near Chatfield

Location
- Country: Canada
- Province: Manitoba
- Rural municipalities: Coldwell, Armstrong

Highway system
- Provincial highways in Manitoba; Winnipeg City Routes
← PR 418	→ PR 421

Provincial Road 419 (PR 419) is a 62.0-kilometre-long (38.5 mi) east–west highway in the Interlake Region of Manitoba, connecting the town of Lundar and the hamlet of Chatfield with Lundar Beach Provincial Park and Lake Manitoba.

== Route description ==
PR 419 begins in the Rural Municipality of Coldwell at the intersection between the main entrance to Lundar Beach Provincial Park and Vincent Road, just metres from the eastern coastline of Lake Manitoba. It heads east as a paved two-lane highway through rural farmland for several kilometres, having an intersection with PR 418, before curving southeast to enter Lundar, passing by Lundar Airport on its way to a junction with PTH 6 (Northern Woods and Water Route). It heads through neighbourhoods along the northern side of town, crossing a former railway before leaving Lundar and travelling through a switchback into Stony Hill as a two-lane gravel road. Entering the Rural Municipality of Armstrong, the highway becomes more narrow and windy as it travels more wooded areas, passing through Lillesve and meeting the southern end of PR 512 at a fork in the road. PR 419 now winds its way through the community of Chatfield, where it regains asphalt, shortly before coming to an end at an intersection with PTH 17.

== Major intersections ==
Division	Location	km	mi	Destinations	Notes
Coldwell	Lundar Beach Provincial Park	0.0	0.0	Lundar Beach Provincial Park main entrance Vincent Road	Western terminus; road continues east as Vincent Road
Coldwell		3.5	2.2	PR 418 north – Eriksdale	Southern terminus of PR 418
Coldwell	Lundar	17.2	10.7	Lundar Airport	Access road into airport
Coldwell	Lundar	18.0	11.2	PTH 6 (NWWR) – Eriksdale, Winnipeg	
Coldwell	Lundar	19.0	11.8	Pavement ends	
Armstrong		50.3	31.3	PR 512 north – Eriksdale	Southern terminus of PR 512
Armstrong	Chatfield	60.7	37.7	Pavement begins	
Armstrong		62.0	38.5	PTH 17 – Fisher Branch, Teulon	Eastern terminus; road continues east as Road 120N
1.000 mi = 1.609 km; 1.000 km = 0.621 mi
