= Manitoba Provincial Road 272 =

Provincial road in Manitoba, Canada

Provincial Road 272
- PR 272 highlighted in red

Route information
- Maintained by Department of Infrastructure
- Length: 21 km (13 mi)
- Existed: 1966–present

Major junctions
- South end: PTH 20 near Camperville
- North end: Duck Bay

Location
- Country: Canada
- Province: Manitoba

Highway system
- Provincial highways in Manitoba; Winnipeg City Routes
← PR 271	→ PR 274

Provincial Road 272 (PR 272) is a provincial road in the Canadian province of Manitoba. It runs from Highway 20 near Camperville to the village of Duck Bay, providing its only road access. It also serves as the main thoroughfare for the Pine Creek First Nation, as well as forming Duck Bay's Main Street, where it dead ends along the coastline of Lake Winnipegosis. PR 272 is a paved two-lane highway for its entire length.

== Major intersections ==
Division	Location	km	mi	Destinations	Notes
No. 19	Camperville / Pine Creek First Nation boundary	0.0	0.0	PTH 20 (NWWR East Branch) – Winnipegosis, Cowan	Southern terminus
No. 19	Duck Bay	21.0	13.0	Lake Winnipegosis	Dead end; northern terminus
1.000 mi = 1.609 km; 1.000 km = 0.621 mi
