= Manitoba Provincial Road 271 =

Provincial Road in Manitoba, Canada

Provincial Route 271
- PR 271 highlighted in red

Route information
- Maintained by Department of Infrastructure
- Length: 32.2 km (20.0 mi)
- Existed: 1966–present

Major junctions
- West end: PTH 10 at Pine River
- PR 489 at Pulp River
- East end: PTH 20 south of Camperville

Location
- Country: Canada
- Province: Manitoba
- Rural municipalities: Mountain

Highway system
- Provincial highways in Manitoba; Winnipeg City Routes
← PR 270	→ PR 272

Provincial Road 271 (PR 271) is a 32.2-kilometre-long (20.0 mi) east–west highway in the Parkland Region of Manitoba. It provides a connection between the towns of Pine River and Camperville via the hamlet of Pulp River, as well as providing a connection between the east and west branches of the Northern Woods and Water Route, PTH 10 and PTH 20.

== Route description ==
PR 271 begins at an intersection with PTH 10 (NWWR West Branch) on the western edge of Pine River. It heads east along 1st Street through neighbourhoods before crossing a former railroad and making a left onto Railway Avenue to pass through downtown. The highway heads north out of town, where the pavement ends, for a few kilometres before making a sharp right turn to travel through farmland. After passing through some woodlands, where it crosses the South Pine River, PR 271 travels through the hamlet of Pulp River, where it crosses a bridge over the Garland River and has an intersection with PR 489. The highway continues due east through a mix of farmland and wooded areas for several more kilometres before coming to an end at a junction with PTH 20 (NWWR East Branch) halfway between the towns of Camperville and Winnipegosis. With the exclusion of the paved section within Pine River, the entire length of PR 271 is a gravel two-lane road.

== Major intersections ==
Division	Location	km	mi	Destinations	Notes
Mountain	Pine River	0.0	0.0	PTH 10 (NWWR West Branch) – Swan River, Dauphin	Western terminus; road continues west as Road 191N
Mountain		13.0	8.1	Bridge over the South Pine River	
Mountain	Pulp River	18.7	11.6	Bridge over the Garland River	
Mountain	Pulp River	19.1	11.9	PR 489 north – Camperville; Garland Road – Garland	Southern terminus of PR 489
Mountain		32.2	20.0	PTH 20 (NWWR East Branch) – Camperville, Winnipegosis	Eastern terminus; road continues as Malcolm Road (Road 192N)
1.000 mi = 1.609 km; 1.000 km = 0.621 mi
