= Valley River (disambiguation) =

Valley River is a tributary of the Hiwassee River in Cherokee County, North Carolina.

Valley River may also refer to:

- Valley River (Manitoba), a river in Southwestern Manitoba, Canada
- Valley River (Minnesota), a river of Minnesota
- Valley River 63A, Manitoba, Canada
- Valley River Center, a shopping mall in Eugene, Oregon

== See also ==
- Tygart Valley River, a tributary of the Monongahela River, West Virginia
- Vallée River, a tributary of the Chaudière River, Ontario, Canada
- River Valley (disambiguation)
