= West Region Tribal Council =

Tribal council

- Headquarters: Erickson, Manitoba; R0J 0P0
- Grand Chief: Chief Norman Bone

The West Region Tribal Council is a First Nations tribal council in Manitoba, acting as the coordinating body for eight band governments of Treaty 2 and Treaty 4, located around the Westman and Parkland regions of the province.

The eight band governments of the Council represent around 9,000 members in total.

== Member bands ==
The eight band governments that comprise the tribal council are the:

- Ebb and Flow First Nation — at Ebb and Flow, Manitoba
- Gamblers First Nation — Binscarth, Manitoba
- Keeseekoowenin First Nation — Elphinstone, Manitoba
- O-Chi-Chak-Ko-Sipi First Nation — Crane River, Manitoba
- Pine Creek First Nation — Camperville, Manitoba
- Rolling River First Nation — Erickson, Manitoba
- Skownan First Nation — Skownan, Manitoba
- Tootinaowaziibeeng Treaty Reserve — Shortdale, Manitoba
