= Treaty Four Reserve Grounds 77 =

Indian reserve in Saskatchewan, Canada

Coordinates: 50°45′37″N 103°47′02″W

- Indian reserve
- Treaty Four Reserve Grounds Indian Reserve No. 77
- Flag

- Location in Saskatchewan
- First Nation: Held collectively
- Country: Canada
- Province: Saskatchewan

Area
  - Total: 99.2 ha (245 acres)

Population (2016)
  - Total: 15
  - Density: 15/km^{2} (39/sq mi)

The Treaty Four Reserve Grounds 77 are an Indian reserve in Saskatchewan, Canada, shared by 33 band governments from Saskatchewan and Manitoba. The Reserve Grounds are surrounded by the town of Fort Qu'Appelle. In the 2016 Canadian Census, they recorded a population of 15 living in 6 of their 8 total private dwellings.

All bands are signatories to Treaty 4. This Reserve may belong to Assiniboine Chief Long Lodge #77, who was a treaty signatory chief to Treaty 4 in 1877 at Cypress Hills. Further this land was designated to be shared by all Treaty 4 bands in 1996 to commemorate the signing of the Treaty Land Entitlement agreements between First Nation and the Provincial and Federal Governments. It was given the #77 after this.

== List of bands sharing the reserve ==
- Carry the Kettle Nakoda First Nation
- Coté First Nation
- Cowessess First Nation
- Day Star First Nation
- Fishing Lake First Nation
- Gambler First Nation
- George Gordon First Nation
- Kahkewistahaw First Nation
- Kawacatoose First Nation
- Keeseekoose First Nation
- Kinistin Saulteaux Nation
- Little Black Bear First Nation
- Muscowpetung Saulteaux Nation
- Muskowekwan First Nation
- Nekaneet Cree Nation
- Ocean Man First Nation
- Ochapowace Nation
- Okanese First Nation
- Pasqua First Nation
- Peepeekisis Cree Nation
- Pheasant Rump Nakota First Nation
- Piapot First Nation
- Pine Creek First Nation
- Rolling River First Nation
- Sapotaweyak Cree Nation
- Star Blanket Cree Nation
- The Key First Nation
- Tootinaowaziibeeng Treaty Reserve
- Waywayseecappo First Nation
- White Bear First Nations
- Wuskwi Sipihk First Nation
- Yellow Quill First Nation
- Zagime Anishinabek

== See also ==
- List of Indian reserves in Saskatchewan
