= Manitoba Highway 20A =

Highway in Manitoba, Canada

Provincial Trunk Highway 20A
- 1st Avenue N.E. Main Street N. River Avenue E.
- PTH 20A highlighted in red

Route information
- Auxiliary route of PTH 20
- Maintained by Manitoba Infrastructure
- Length: 5.3 km (3.3 mi)
- Existed: 1966–present

Major junctions
- South end: PTH 20 at Dauphin
- PTH 5A / PTH 10A (Main Street N.)
- North end: PTH 20 at Dauphin

Location
- Country: Canada
- Province: Manitoba
- Major cities: Dauphin

Highway system
- Provincial highways in Manitoba; Winnipeg City Routes
← PTH 20	→ PTH 21

Provincial Trunk Highway 20A (PTH 20A) is a 5.3-kilometre (3.3 mi) long provincial highway spur in the Parkland Region of the Canadian province of Manitoba. Its main purpose is to provide access to Dauphin for any traffic using PTH 20.

Unlike most alternate highways, which would have been the original route of the main highway before it was realigned and redesignated, the southern leg of PTH 20A (1st Avenue N.E.) was the original route of PTH 5 before its current section between Ochre River and PTH 10 south was constructed and opened to traffic in 1959. Prior to the realignment of PTH 5, PTH 20's southern terminus was just east of Dauphin. Although it acts as the eastern boundary for its city limits, PTH 20 never enters Dauphin itself.

== Route description ==
From its southern terminus with PTH 20, PTH 20A travels three kilometres (1.9 miles) into Dauphin's city center along 1st Avenue N.E. where it meets the alternate routes of both PTH 5 and PTH 10 in Dauphin's city center. PTH 20A comes into the concurrency for about 20 metres (70 feet) before PTH 5A/10A turns left on to 2nd Avenue N.W. From this point, it travels northeast along Main Street N. and River Avenue E. for two kilometres (1.2 miles) back to its northern terminus with PTH 20.

The speed limit is 50 km/h (30 mph).

== Major intersections ==
The entire route is in Dauphin.

km	mi	Destinations	Notes
0.0	0.0	PTH 20 (NWWR) – Ochre River, Winnipegosis	Southern terminus
2.7	1.7	PTH 5A south / PTH 10A south (Main Street S)	Southern end of PTH 5A / 10A concurrency
2.8	1.7	PTH 5A north / PTH 10A north (2nd Avenue NW)	Northern end of PTH 5A / 10A concurrency
5.3	3.3	PTH 20 (NWWR) – Winnipegosis, Ochre River	Northern terminus
1.000 mi = 1.609 km; 1.000 km = 0.621 mi: Concurrency terminus
