= River Valley =

A river valley is a valley formed by flowing water.

- River valley civilization

== Geography ==
- River Valley, Singapore
  - River Valley Single Member Constituency
  - River Valley High School
- River Valley, Nipissing District, Ontario

== Schools ==
- River Valley Community College (RVCC), a community college with campuses in Claremont, Keene, and Lebanon, New Hampshire.
- River Valley High School (Bidwell, Ohio)
- River Valley High School (Yuba City, California)

== See also ==
- River Valley Conference (disambiguation)
- Valley River (disambiguation)
- River (disambiguation)
- Valley (disambiguation)
