= Ashern =

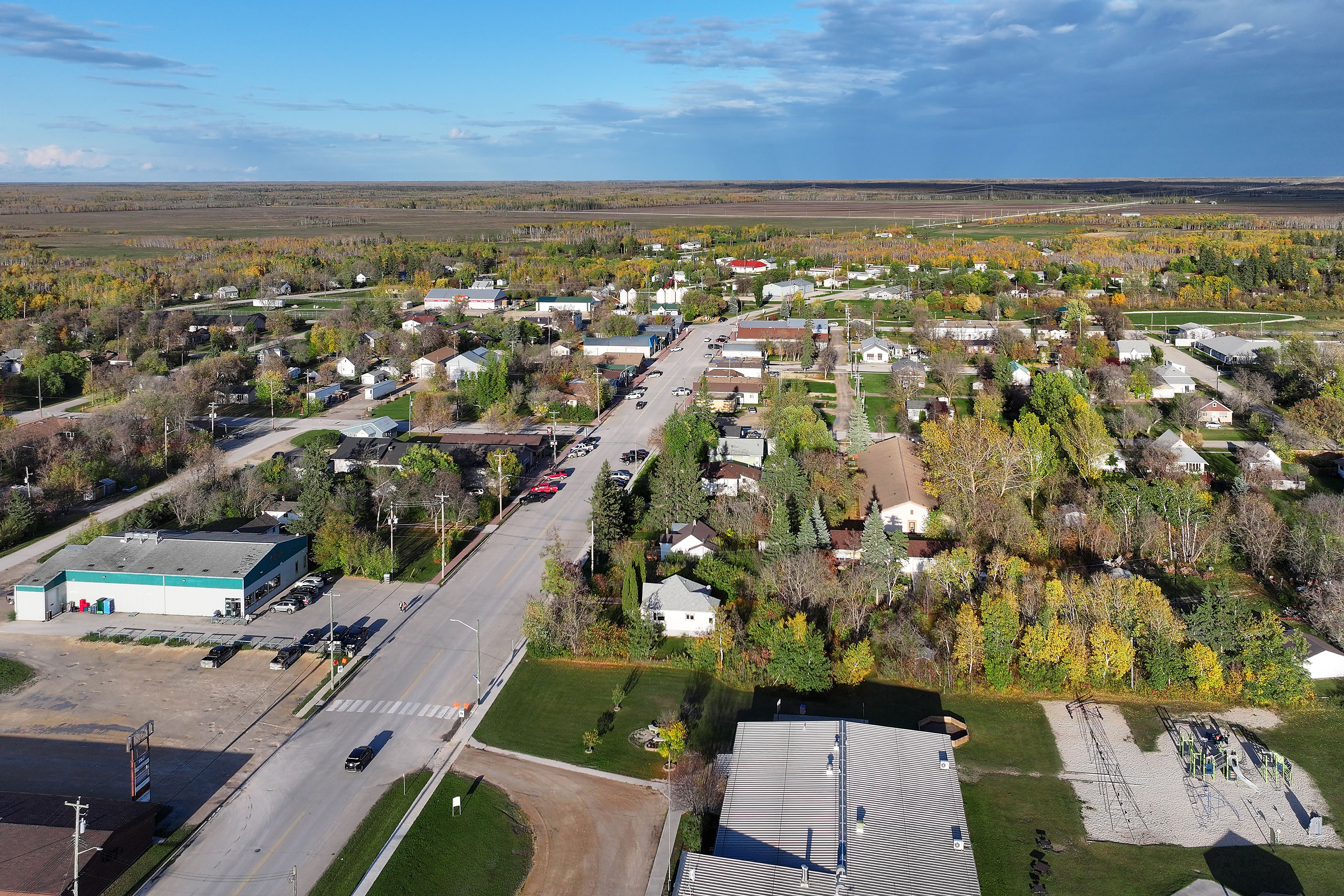
- Ashern (2025)

- Location of Ashern in Manitoba
- Coordinates: 51°10′56″N 98°20′44″W
- Country: Canada
- Province: Manitoba
- Region: Interlake
- Census Division: No. 18

Government
  - MP: James Bezan
  - MLA: Derek Johnson

Population (2021 Canadian census)
  - Total: 616
- Time zone: UTC−6 (CST)
  - Summer (DST): UTC−5 (CDT)
- Postal Code: R0C 0E0
- Area code: 204
- NTS Map: 062O01
- GNBC Code: GABCU

Ashern is a local urban district located in the Municipality of West Interlake in Manitoba's Interlake Region.

Today, the community supports the agriculture (mostly beef in addition to a few private pork and chicken farms), fishing, mineral extraction, recreation and tourism industries. The community of Ashern is the largest community in the municipality and is a regional service centre to a trading area of approximately 8,000 people.

== History ==
The Canadian National Railway arrived in this area in 1911, and a fourth-class CPR station was built in 1920. Ashern was named after A. S. Hern, a timekeeper of the firm that constructed the railway that served the Western Interlake.

The Ashern School District was established in February 1911, originally as number 1556 but later being reformed as number 1880 in April 1917, when the former number was reused for the Beatty School District.

In 1919, the Ashern Presbyterian Church was constructed, later becoming the Ashern United Church in 1925. An addition to the building was made in the 1950s.

A new school building was constructed in 1953, later replaced with the present-day Ashern Central School. The Ashern Primary School (also known as Ashern Elementary) would later be replaced with Ashern Early Years School. In 1967, Ashern became part of the Lakeshore School Division.

The community previously belonged to the Rural Municipality of Siglunes, incorporated in 1917, which amalgamated with RM of Eriksdale to become the Municipality of West Interlake in 2015.

== Demographics ==
In the 2021 Census of Population conducted by Statistics Canada, Ashern had a population of 616 living in 279 of its 326 total private dwellings, a change of 9% from its 2016 population of 565. With a land area of 3.01 km^{2} (1.16 sq mi), it had a population density of 204.7/km^{2} (530.0/sq mi) in 2021.

== Amenities and activities ==
Ashern is home the world's largest sharptail grouse, a 5-meter-tall (16-foot) monument erected in 1979 to commemorate the birdwatching and hunting qualities of the area.

The Ashern Museum, open seasonally between June and September, features six restored heritage buildings: the Ashern fourth-class Canadian National Railway station (built in 1920), which is now the museum office; St. Michael's Anglican Church (1912); Hoffman log house (1929); Ashern post office building (1931); Siglunes municipal office (1931); and Darwin School No. 1576 (1912).

Ashern has a community hall, an Elk's Hall and a Royal Canadian Legion Hall that cater to a wide variety of events and community groups.

The fall months are welcomed by avid hunters as the Siglunes region is a popular place for hunters.

It hosts the Annual Ashern Rodeo during the Labour Day weekend. A street dance, fireworks, parade, rodeo and social are also a part of Labour Day Weekend in Ashern, as well as the Ashern Horse Show.

The Ashern Hornets is the hockey team that plays in the South Interlake Hockey League (SIHL). Ashern is the hometown of the former NHL player Chuck Arnason, as well as actor Adam Beach. Ashern is about two hours north of Winnipeg. The (Grade 5–12) high school is the largest in the division. It also has an elementary school (Kindergarten-Grade 4), recently built daycare, and a hospital serving the region.

== Climate ==
Ashern has a humid continental climate (Köppen Dfb) with warm summers and very cold winters. Due to its position far from large moderating bodies of water and its quite high latitude Ashern see extreme temperature variation over the course of the year.

Climate data for Ashern
Month	Jan	Feb	Mar	Apr	May	Jun	Jul	Aug	Sep	Oct	Nov	Dec	Year
Record high °C (°F)	8.3 (46.9)	9 (48)	16.1 (61.0)	33 (91)	37 (99)	36.5 (97.7)	35.6 (96.1)	37.5 (99.5)	36.7 (98.1)	26.5 (79.7)	18.3 (64.9)	8 (46)	37.5 (99.5)
Mean daily maximum °C (°F)	−13.3 (8.1)	−9.4 (15.1)	−1.6 (29.1)	9.6 (49.3)	18.1 (64.6)	22.5 (72.5)	25.3 (77.5)	23.8 (74.8)	17 (63)	9.8 (49.6)	−1.6 (29.1)	−11.2 (11.8)	7.4 (45.3)
Daily mean °C (°F)	−19.3 (−2.7)	−15.8 (3.6)	−7.8 (18.0)	3 (37)	11 (52)	15.7 (60.3)	18.4 (65.1)	16.9 (62.4)	10.8 (51.4)	4.5 (40.1)	−6 (21)	−16.5 (2.3)	1.3 (34.3)
Mean daily minimum °C (°F)	−25.2 (−13.4)	−22.1 (−7.8)	−13.9 (7.0)	−3.6 (25.5)	4 (39)	8.8 (47.8)	11.5 (52.7)	10 (50)	4.6 (40.3)	−0.8 (30.6)	−10.4 (13.3)	−21.7 (−7.1)	−4.9 (23.2)
Record low °C (°F)	−47.2 (−53.0)	−46.1 (−51.0)	−39.5 (−39.1)	−33 (−27)	−10.6 (12.9)	−4 (25)	−0.6 (30.9)	−3.5 (25.7)	−9.5 (14.9)	−20.5 (−4.9)	−39.5 (−39.1)	−45.6 (−50.1)	−47.2 (−53.0)
Average precipitation mm (inches)	17.1 (0.67)	12.8 (0.50)	23.5 (0.93)	28.9 (1.14)	50.2 (1.98)	87.4 (3.44)	61.1 (2.41)	80.7 (3.18)	60.8 (2.39)	38.2 (1.50)	21.7 (0.85)	17.5 (0.69)	499.9 (19.68)
Source: Environment Canada

== Pop culture ==
The 1982 National Film Board film, The Pedlar, was shot in town.

=== Notable people ===
- Chuck Arnason, former professional hockey player
- Adam Beach, actor
