= Donald K. Johnson =

Canadian philanthropist

Donald Kenneth Johnson, CC (born June 18, 1935) is a Canadian businessman and philanthropist. Born and raised in Lundar, Manitoba, he currently resides in Toronto, Ontario.

== Life and career ==
Johnson received a B.Sc. degree in electrical engineering in 1957 from the University of Manitoba, and a M.B.A. degree in 1963 from what is now the Ivey Business School. His initial career was in electrical engineering with Canadian General Electric in Toronto and with Federal Electric Corporation on the DEW line in the Canadian Arctic.

In 1963, Johnson began his career in the investment industry when he joined Burns Bros. & Denton Ltd. Thereafter, he held a series of management positions in Institutional Equity, Sales, Trading, Research, International, Retail and Investment Management. He was President of Burns Fry from 1984 to 1989, then held senior positions with its successor firms. He eventually became vice-chairman of BMO Nesbitt Burns before retiring in October 2004.

Johnson is a member of the advisory board of BMO Capital Markets. He has also served on the board of directors of a number of public companies, including goeasy Ltd., where he was chairman from 2000 to 2018 and has been chairman emeritus since January 2019.

In addition, Johnson was on the board of governors of the Toronto Stock Exchange from 1978 to 1980 and served as Chairman of the Investment Dealers Association of Canada from 1988 to 1989.

Johnson was married to Anna McCowan (née Wilmot; formerly Gilmour) from 1981 until her death in 2020. He was her third husband and is the stepfather of her two sons, Sean and Kaelin McCowan. He also has three children from his prior marriage – Virginia, Carter and Jessica.

== Non-profit sector ==
Johnson's activity in the not-for-profit sector has been extensive. He serves on the advisory board of the Ivey Business School at Western University. He is a member of the board of directors of the Toronto General and Western Hospital Foundation and has been a major donor to the Donald K. Johnson Eye Institute at Toronto Western Hospital. Johnson is a director and chairman emeritus of the Council for Business and the Arts in Canada, and a member of the Major Individual Gifts Campaign Cabinet of the United Way of Greater Toronto.

He is a former board member of the Bishop Strachan School Foundation and of the National Ballet of Canada. In 1996-97, he chaired a successful $13 million capital campaign to build a new home in Toronto for the National Ballet.

Johnson has played the lead role on behalf of the Canadian charitable sector in lobbying the federal government to remove tax barriers for gifts of publicly listed securities to registered charities. His efforts over many years met with success first in 1997 when the government cut the capitals gains tax for such gifts in half, and then further in 2006 when the tax was eliminated entirely. Charities have received over $1 billion CAD in gifts of stock virtually every year since 2006.

== Awards and honours ==
Johnson has received many awards, including the Outstanding Volunteer Award from the Association of Fundraising Professionals (1997), Friends of the Canadian Association of Gift Planners (1997), Richard Ivey School of Business Distinguished Service (1998) and the Arbor Award for Outstanding Volunteer Service from the University of Toronto (1999). In 2013, he was named as an Inaugural Inductee to the IIAC Investment Industry Hall of Fame.

In 2005, Johnson was appointed as a Member of the Order of Canada. He was promoted to Officer in 2009 "for his key role in changing Canada’s tax laws to eliminate the capital gains tax on gifts of publicly traded securities to registered charities, and for his support of health care research and the arts". In 2026, he was promoted to Companion.
