= Rural Municipality of Siglunes =

Rural municipality in Manitoba, Canada

Coordinates: 51°04′02″N 98°29′26″W

The Rural Municipality of Siglunes is a former rural municipality (RM) in the Canadian province of Manitoba. It was originally incorporated as a rural municipality on April 1, 1919. It ceased on January 1, 2015, as a result of its provincially mandated amalgamation with the RM of Eriksdale to form the Municipality of West Interlake.

The former RM is located on the east shore of Lake Manitoba at the narrowest part of the lake, across from the Rural Municipality of Alonsa to the west.

== Communities ==
- Ashern
- Oakview
- The Narrows
- Vogar
