= Cowan, Manitoba =

Town in Manitoba, Canada

Coordinates: 52.0339°N 100.6494°W

Location of Cowan in Manitoba

Cowan, Manitoba is a town in Manitoba, Canada. It is located off the intersection of Manitoba Highways 10 and 20, 21 miles west of Camperville, and 17 miles east of Minitonas.

== Climate ==
Climate data for Cowan
Month	Jan	Feb	Mar	Apr	May	Jun	Jul	Aug	Sep	Oct	Nov	Dec	Year
Record high °C (°F)	13.0 (55.4)	15.0 (59.0)	24.5 (76.1)	30.0 (86.0)	35.0 (95.0)	37.0 (98.6)	38.0 (100.4)	38.0 (100.4)	32.0 (89.6)	29.0 (84.2)	20.0 (68.0)	14.5 (58.1)	38.0 (100.4)
Mean daily maximum °C (°F)	−10.3 (13.5)	−6.9 (19.6)	0.4 (32.7)	9.9 (49.8)	17.4 (63.3)	22.4 (72.3)	25.4 (77.7)	24.0 (75.2)	17.6 (63.7)	9.3 (48.7)	−1.8 (28.8)	−8.2 (17.2)	8.3 (46.9)
Daily mean °C (°F)	−16.5 (2.3)	−13.6 (7.5)	−6.6 (20.1)	2.5 (36.5)	9.6 (49.3)	14.9 (58.8)	17.8 (64.0)	16.3 (61.3)	10.6 (51.1)	3.4 (38.1)	−6.8 (19.8)	−13.9 (7.0)	1.5 (34.7)
Mean daily minimum °C (°F)	−22.7 (−8.9)	−20.2 (−4.4)	−13.5 (7.7)	−4.9 (23.2)	1.7 (35.1)	7.5 (45.5)	10.1 (50.2)	8.6 (47.5)	3.6 (38.5)	−2.6 (27.3)	−11.9 (10.6)	−19.5 (−3.1)	−5.3 (22.5)
Record low °C (°F)	−45.0 (−49.0)	−44.0 (−47.2)	−45.0 (−49.0)	−27.0 (−16.6)	−16.0 (3.2)	−5.0 (23.0)	−2.5 (27.5)	−3.0 (26.6)	−12.0 (10.4)	−23.0 (−9.4)	−38.0 (−36.4)	−42.0 (−43.6)	−45.0 (−49.0)
Average precipitation mm (inches)	30.6 (1.20)	24.8 (0.98)	33.6 (1.32)	34.5 (1.36)	61.0 (2.40)	99.0 (3.90)	87.6 (3.45)	75.8 (2.98)	67.5 (2.66)	42.7 (1.68)	28.6 (1.13)	32.1 (1.26)	617.8 (24.32)
Average rainfall mm (inches)	0.5 (0.02)	1.3 (0.05)	4.6 (0.18)	12.4 (0.49)	56.6 (2.23)	98.9 (3.89)	87.6 (3.45)	75.8 (2.98)	66.4 (2.61)	27.6 (1.09)	2.9 (0.11)	0.5 (0.02)	435.4 (17.14)
Average snowfall cm (inches)	30.0 (11.8)	23.5 (9.3)	29.0 (11.4)	22.1 (8.7)	4.4 (1.7)	0.1 (0.0)	0.0 (0.0)	0.0 (0.0)	1.0 (0.4)	15.1 (5.9)	25.7 (10.1)	31.6 (12.4)	182.5 (71.9)
Source: Environment Canada
