= Pine Creek First Nation =

Coordinates: 52°03′34″N 100°11′48″W

Pine Creek First Nation Band No. 282
- People: Saulteaux
- Treaty: Treaty 4
- Headquarters: Camperville, Manitoba

Land
- Main reserve: Pine Creek 66A

Population (2021)
- On reserve: 648
- On other land: 320
- Off reserve: 2912
- Total population: 3,880

Government
- Chief: Derek Nepinak
- Council size: 4

Tribal Council
- West Region Tribal Council

Website
- pinecreekfirstnation.com

Location of Pine Creek in Manitoba

The Minegoziibe Anishinabe (Formerly Pine Creek First Nation) is a Saulteaux First Nation in Manitoba, Canada. The First Nation's homeland is the Pine Creek 66A reserve, located approximately 110 kilometres north of Dauphin along the southwestern shore of Lake Winnipegosis between the communities of Camperville and Duck Bay. The Rural Municipality of Mountain (South) borders it on the southwest.

The current chief of Pine Creek First Nation is Derek Nepinak. Pine Creek First Nation is part of Treaty 4. As of 2013, the First Nation's registered population was 3,188, with 1,058 members living on reserves or crown land and 2,130 members living off reserve.

The primary language spoken on the reserve is Saulteaux.

== History ==
The community had a two-storey steeple church erected 1906-1910, but it was destroyed in a fire in 1930. A second church with a single steeple was reconstructed using the first building's salvageable stone walls.

Pine Creek First Nation had a residential school on its Reserve, built 1894-1897. The large four-storey school building was destroyed in 1972.

== Reserves ==
Pine Creek 66A is the main reserve of Pine Creek First Nation, with a total size of 81.117 km^{2} (20,044 acres). It is located approximately 110 kilometres north of Dauphin along the southwestern shore of Lake Winnipegosis between the communities of Camperville and Duck Bay. The Rural Municipality of Mountain (South) borders it on the southwest.

Along with 32 other First Nations, Pine Creek First Nation also holds interest on the Treaty Four Reserve Grounds 77, which spans 37.1 ha (92 acres) and is located adjacent to Fort Qu'Appelle, Saskatchewan.

== See also ==
- Aboriginal peoples in Manitoba
