= List of Manitoba provincial forests =

Provincial forests are located within the province of Manitoba, in Canada, as large areas of unpopulated and undeveloped forests. Under the Forests Act, provincial forests were developed primarily as a source of sustainable timber supply for forestry operations. Today there are 15 designated provincial forests in Manitoba, totalling almost 22,000 km^{2}. Provincial forests are managed for diverse economic, environmental, social and cultural uses. They are very popular places for berry picking, mushroom picking, hunting, hiking, skiing, snowmobiling, and exploring.

List of Manitoba Provincial Forests
Name	Established	Area
Agassiz Provincial Forest	1954	795 km^{2} (307 sq mi)
Belair Provincial Forest	1954	204 km^{2} (79 sq mi)
Brightstone Sand Hill Provincial Forest	1984	133 km^{2} (51 sq mi)
Cat Hills Provincial Forest	1981	16 km^{2} (6.2 sq mi)
Cormorant Provincial Forest	1947	1,479 km^{2} (571 sq mi)
Duck Mountain Provincial Forest	1906	3,770 km^{2} (1,460 sq mi)
Moose Creek Provincial Forest	1987	658 km^{2} (254 sq mi)
Northwest Angle Provincial Forest	1956	2,129 km^{2} (822 sq mi)
Porcupine Provincial Forest	1906	2,090 km^{2} (810 sq mi)
Sandilands Provincial Forest	1923	2,772 km^{2} (1,070 sq mi)
Spruce Woods Provincial Forest	1895	601 km^{2} (232 sq mi)
Swan-Pelican Provincial Forest	1987	3,705 km^{2} (1,431 sq mi)
Turtle Mountain Provincial Forest	1895	181 km^{2} (70 sq mi)
Wampum Provincial Forest	1987	10 km^{2} (3.9 sq mi)
Whiteshell Provincial Forest	1931	3,442 km^{2} (1,329 sq mi)

== See also ==
- List of protected areas of Manitoba
