= Vogar, Manitoba =

Coordinates: 50.9519°N 98.645°W

Vogar is a hamlet in the province of Manitoba, Canada. It is located approximately 158 km (98 mi) northwest of Winnipeg within the Municipality of West Interlake.

== Climate ==
Climate data for Vogar, Manitoba
Month	Jan	Feb	Mar	Apr	May	Jun	Jul	Aug	Sep	Oct	Nov	Dec	Year
Record high °C (°F)	10.5 (50.9)	10.5 (50.9)	13.0 (55.4)	27.8 (82.0)	36.0 (96.8)	33.5 (92.3)	35.0 (95.0)	35.0 (95.0)	33.0 (91.4)	26.0 (78.8)	16.1 (61.0)	9.1 (48.4)	36.0 (96.8)
Mean daily maximum °C (°F)	−11.5 (11.3)	−8.3 (17.1)	−1.9 (28.6)	7.8 (46.0)	15.6 (60.1)	21.3 (70.3)	24.3 (75.7)	23.4 (74.1)	17.0 (62.6)	8.6 (47.5)	−1.4 (29.5)	−9.0 (15.8)	7.2 (45.0)
Daily mean °C (°F)	−16.7 (1.9)	−13.9 (7.0)	−7.3 (18.9)	2.5 (36.5)	12.2 (54.0)	16.7 (62.1)	19.8 (67.6)	18.8 (65.8)	12.6 (54.7)	4.8 (40.6)	−4.9 (23.2)	−13.4 (7.9)	2.5 (36.5)
Mean daily minimum °C (°F)	−21.8 (−7.2)	−19.3 (−2.7)	−12.3 (9.9)	−2.8 (27.0)	5.3 (41.5)	12.2 (54.0)	15.3 (59.5)	14.1 (57.4)	8.0 (46.4)	0.9 (33.6)	−8.5 (16.7)	−17.7 (0.1)	2.2 (36.0)
Record low °C (°F)	−40.0 (−40.0)	−42.0 (−43.6)	−40.0 (−40.0)	−28.9 (−20.0)	−9.4 (15.1)	0.0 (32.0)	3.9 (39.0)	−1.0 (30.2)	−5.0 (23.0)	−17.5 (0.5)	−38.5 (−37.3)	−38.9 (−38.0)	−42.0 (−43.6)
Average precipitation mm (inches)	21.9 (0.86)	15.3 (0.60)	27.1 (1.07)	29.5 (1.16)	66.0 (2.60)	85.4 (3.36)	64.6 (2.54)	57.5 (2.26)	52.1 (2.05)	38.4 (1.51)	22.7 (0.89)	22.3 (0.88)	502.9 (19.80)
Average rainfall mm (inches)	0.1 (0.00)	1.2 (0.05)	8.2 (0.32)	15.8 (0.62)	63.1 (2.48)	85.4 (3.36)	64.6 (2.54)	57.5 (2.26)	51.8 (2.04)	31.8 (1.25)	6.6 (0.26)	0.8 (0.03)	387.0 (15.24)
Average snowfall cm (inches)	21.8 (8.6)	14.1 (5.6)	18.7 (7.4)	13.6 (5.4)	2.9 (1.1)	0.0 (0.0)	0.0 (0.0)	0.0 (0.0)	0.3 (0.1)	6.7 (2.6)	16.2 (6.4)	21.6 (8.5)	115.9 (45.6)
Source: Environment Canada
