= Valley River (Manitoba) =

River in Manitoba

Location
- Country: Canada
- Province: Manitoba

Physical characteristics
- Source
  - location: Duck Mountains
- Mouth
  - location: Dauphin Lake
  - coordinates: 51°21′27″N 99°54′39″W
- Basin size: 2,880 km^{2} (1,110 sq mi)

The Valley River is a river in Southwestern Manitoba, Canada, whose valley separates the Duck Mountains from the Riding Mountains. It drains an area of approximately 2880 km^{2}.

The river begins in the Duck Mountains and then descends into its valley where it passes through Tootinaowaziibeeng Treaty Reserve, Grandview, and Gilbert Plains before emptying into Dauphin Lake.

In 1889, the Shaw Brothers Lumber Company opened a flour mill and a sawmill on the river.
