= Tootinaowaziibeeng Treaty Reserve =

First Nations in Manitoba, Canada

Coordinates: 51°13′40″N 100°58′22″W

- Band No. 292
- People: Saulteaux (Ojibwe)
- Treaty: Treaty 4
- Headquarters: Shortdale, Municipality of Roblin
- Province: Manitoba

Land
- Main reserve: Valley River 63A
- Reserve: Treaty Four Reserve Grounds No. 77
- Land area: 48.49 km^{2} (18.72 sq mi)

Population (2025)
- On reserve: 714
- On other land: 8
- Off reserve: 945
- Total population: 1,667

Government
- Chief: Barry McKay
- Council: Jessica Ironstand-Nelson; Derek Mancheese; Caroline Mintuck; Grant Rattlesnake

Tribal Council
- West Region Tribal Council

Website
- tootinaowaziibeeng.wordpress.com

The Tootinaowaziibeeng Treaty Reserve (Ojibwe: Dootinaawi-ziibiing) is a First Nation located 35 km (22 mi) east of Roblin, Manitoba, 74 km (46 mi) west of Dauphin, Manitoba, and approximately 5 km (3.1 mi) north of Highway 5. Tootinaowaziibeeng is a Treaty 4 First Nation.

Its main reserve is Valley River 63A, which is bordered by both the Municipality of Roblin and Grandview Municipality, as well as by the Duck Mountain Provincial Forest on its north side. The Valley River runs through the First Nation starting in the northwestern corner and exiting at the southeast.

The total population of the First Nation in 2025 was 1,667, of which about half are at the Valley River reserve and the remainder at various locations off-reserve.

== Reserves ==
Valley River 63A is the main reserve of Tootinaowaziibeeng Treaty Reserve. It is located 320 km (200 mi) northwest from Winnipeg, and has an area of 4,749.8 ha (11,737 acres).

It is bordered by the municipalities of Grandview and Roblin, as well as by the Duck Mountain Provincial Forest on its north side. The Valley River runs through the community, starting in the northwestern corner and exiting at the southeast.

The First Nation also has a smaller reserve, Treaty Four Reserve Grounds No. 77 (99.2 ha (245 acres)), which is shared with 31 other First Nations.
