= Swan-Pelican Provincial Forest =

Provincial forest in Manitoba, Canada

Coordinates: 52°29′00″N 100°22′30″W

Manitoba's Swan-Pelican Provincial Forest lies just west of Lake Winnipegosis, and is named for the two smaller lakes in the area, Swan Lake and Pelican Lake. The forest has an area of 3,705 km^{2} (1,430 sq mi), and is the second-largest provincial forest in Manitoba (after Duck Mountain Provincial Forest). Most of the forest is located within the unorganized portion of Census Division No. 19, but its southernmost reaches extend into the Rural Municipality of Mountain (South). A fairly newly established forest, it was not officially recognized as a provincial forest until 1987.

== See also ==
- List of Manitoba provincial forests
