= Rural Municipality of West Interlake =

Rural municipality in Manitoba, Canada

West Interlake
- Rural municipality
- Rural Municipality of West Interlake
- Location of the RM of West Interlake in Manitoba
- Coordinates: 51.032°N 98.100°W
- Country: Canada
- Province: Manitoba
- Region: Interlake
- Incorporated (amalgamated): January 1, 2015
- Time zone: UTC-6 (CST)
  - Summer (DST): UTC-5 (CDT)
- Website: rmofwestinterlake.com

The Rural Municipality of West Interlake is a rural municipality (RM) in the Canadian province of Manitoba.

== History ==
The RM was incorporated on January 1, 2015, via the amalgamation of the RMs of Eriksdale and Siglunes. It was formed as a requirement of The Municipal Amalgamations Act, which required that municipalities with a population less than 1,000 amalgamate with one or more neighbouring municipalities by 2015. The Government of Manitoba initiated these amalgamations in order for municipalities to meet the 1997 minimum population requirement of 1,000 to incorporate a municipality.

== Communities ==
- Ashern
- Eriksdale
- Oakview
- The Narrows
- Vogar

== Demographics ==
In the 2021 Census of Population conducted by Statistics Canada, West Interlake had a population of 2,228 living in 989 of its 1,314 total private dwellings, a change of 3.1% from its 2016 population of 2,162. With a land area of 1,643.72 km^{2} (634.64 sq mi), it had a population density of 1.4/km^{2} (3.5/sq mi) in 2021.
