= River Valley Conference =

River Valley Conference may refer to several American high school sports leagues:

- River Valley Conference (Illinois)
- River Valley Conference (Iowa)
