= Lundar =

- Location of Lundar in Manitoba
- Coordinates: 50°41′44″N 98°1′51″W
- Country: Canada
- Province: Manitoba
- Region: Interlake
- Census Division: No. 18

Government
  - Governing Body: Rural Municipality of Coldwell Council
  - MP: James Bezan
  - MLA: Derek Johnson

Area
  - Total: 1.10 km^{2} (0.42 sq mi)

Population (2021)
  - Total: 499
  - Density: 454/km^{2} (1,170/sq mi)
- Time zone: UTC−6 (CST)
  - Summer (DST): UTC−5 (CDT)
- Postal Code: R0C 1Y0
- Area code: 204
- NTS Map: 062J09
- GNBC Code: GAPPO

Lundar is a local urban district in the Rural Municipality of Coldwell, Manitoba, Canada. Located in Manitoba's Interlake Region, it is situated 99 km (62 mi) north of Winnipeg on Highway 6.

Nearby attractions include Lake Manitoba and its beaches, and the Lundar Beach Provincial Park. Lundar is home to a Canada goose refuge, and a large statue of a Canada goose is located in the community. Lundar was founded by Icelandic settlers as part of the region of New Iceland.

== Attractions and amenities ==
The community is home to the Lundar Falcons, a junior "B" ice hockey team.

The Lundar Airport is located just northwest of Lundar.

A monument was erected in 1955 to commemorate the Icelandic pioneers of Lundar, as well as other Icelandic settlements in North America (such as Markland), who arrived in this region in 1887.

The Lundar Museum includes four historical buildings, including a former Canadian National Railway station, an early settler’s cabin, Mary Hill School No. 987, and the Notre Dame Roman Catholic church.

A statue of a large Canada goose is located in Lundar. Designed by local naturalist Lawrence King and painted by artist Marlene Magnusson Hourd, it was created using funds raised in the mid-1970s, and unveiled on May 20, 1978.

== Toponymy ==
Lundar is the nominative plural indefinite of lundur "wood, grove" in Icelandic, from Old Norse lundr, same thing. This place-name is related through Old Norman to the Canadian Patronymic Lalonde, which is from the Norman surnames Lalonde or Delalonde, themselves from place-names in Normandy called la Londe "the grove, the wood" (Lunda in ancient documents).

== Climate ==
Lundar experiences a humid continental climate (Köppen Dfb) with warm to hot summers and cold winters. There are two weather stations in the Lundar area reporting climate data:

Climate data for Lundar
Month	Jan	Feb	Mar	Apr	May	Jun	Jul	Aug	Sep	Oct	Nov	Dec	Year
Record high °C (°F)	7 (45)	7 (45)	14 (57)	28 (82)	34 (93)	37 (99)	34 (93)	38.5 (101.3)	38 (100)	29 (84)	15.5 (59.9)	9 (48)	38.5 (101.3)
Mean daily maximum °C (°F)	−12.7 (9.1)	−8 (18)	−1.3 (29.7)	9.4 (48.9)	17.7 (63.9)	22.8 (73.0)	24.7 (76.5)	24.7 (76.5)	17.7 (63.9)	9.7 (49.5)	−2.1 (28.2)	−9.8 (14.4)	7.7 (45.9)
Daily mean °C (°F)	−18.1 (−0.6)	−13.5 (7.7)	−6.6 (20.1)	3.3 (37.9)	10.9 (51.6)	16.4 (61.5)	18.3 (64.9)	17.7 (63.9)	11.3 (52.3)	4.4 (39.9)	−6.5 (20.3)	−14.6 (5.7)	1.9 (35.4)
Mean daily minimum °C (°F)	−23.6 (−10.5)	−18.8 (−1.8)	−11.9 (10.6)	−2.9 (26.8)	4.1 (39.4)	9.9 (49.8)	11.9 (53.4)	10.6 (51.1)	4.9 (40.8)	−1.1 (30.0)	−10.8 (12.6)	−19.4 (−2.9)	−3.9 (25.0)
Record low °C (°F)	−44 (−47)	−45.5 (−49.9)	−39.5 (−39.1)	−28 (−18)	−12 (10)	−2.5 (27.5)	0.5 (32.9)	−2.5 (27.5)	−7 (19)	−22 (−8)	−38 (−36)	−43.5 (−46.3)	−45.5 (−49.9)
Average precipitation mm (inches)	14.7 (0.58)	14.5 (0.57)	19.8 (0.78)	27.8 (1.09)	54.2 (2.13)	82.5 (3.25)	66.6 (2.62)	68.6 (2.70)	50.6 (1.99)	35.7 (1.41)	19.7 (0.78)	18.5 (0.73)	473.1 (18.63)
Source: Environment Canada

Climate data for Lundar 4SW
Month	Jan	Feb	Mar	Apr	May	Jun	Jul	Aug	Sep	Oct	Nov	Dec	Year
Record high °C (°F)	7 (45)	7.5 (45.5)	16.7 (62.1)	33.5 (92.3)	36.5 (97.7)	36 (97)	35 (95)	38 (100)	37 (99)	25.6 (78.1)	17.2 (63.0)	7 (45)	38 (100)
Mean daily maximum °C (°F)	−13 (9)	−9.1 (15.6)	−1.7 (28.9)	10.2 (50.4)	18.5 (65.3)	22.4 (72.3)	25.3 (77.5)	24.1 (75.4)	16.7 (62.1)	10.1 (50.2)	−1.5 (29.3)	−10.9 (12.4)	7.6 (45.7)
Daily mean °C (°F)	−18.9 (−2.0)	−15.3 (4.5)	−7.7 (18.1)	3.8 (38.8)	11.7 (53.1)	16.1 (61.0)	19.1 (66.4)	17.7 (63.9)	11 (52)	4.9 (40.8)	−5.8 (21.6)	−16.3 (2.7)	1.7 (35.1)
Mean daily minimum °C (°F)	−24.8 (−12.6)	−21.4 (−6.5)	−13.7 (7.3)	−2.7 (27.1)	4.9 (40.8)	9.8 (49.6)	12.9 (55.2)	11.3 (52.3)	5.2 (41.4)	−0.4 (31.3)	−10.1 (13.8)	−21.5 (−6.7)	−4.2 (24.4)
Record low °C (°F)	−44 (−47)	−43.9 (−47.0)	−35.6 (−32.1)	−32 (−26)	−9.5 (14.9)	−3 (27)	1.7 (35.1)	−0.6 (30.9)	−7.8 (18.0)	−17.5 (0.5)	−37 (−35)	−38.9 (−38.0)	−44 (−47)
Average precipitation mm (inches)	12.1 (0.48)	12.9 (0.51)	17.7 (0.70)	27.7 (1.09)	49.6 (1.95)	69.6 (2.74)	52.7 (2.07)	85.6 (3.37)	58.5 (2.30)	35.1 (1.38)	18.5 (0.73)	16.8 (0.66)	456.8 (17.98)
Source: Environment Canada

== Demographics ==
In the 2021 Census of Population conducted by Statistics Canada, Lundar had a population of 499 living in 212 of its 249 total private dwellings, a change of 8% from its 2016 population of 462. With a land area of 1.1 km^{2} (0.42 sq mi), it had a population density of 453.6/km^{2} (1,174.9/sq mi) in 2021.

== Notable people ==
- Christian Halldorson
- Donald K. Johnson
- Larry Thor
- Austin Magnusson
