= Duck Bay, Manitoba =

Community in Manitoba, Canada

Duck Bay
- Location of Duck Bay in Manitoba
- Coordinates: 52°10′35″N 100°08′57″W
- Country: Canada
- Province: Manitoba
- Region: Parkland

Government
  - MP (Dauphin—Swan River—Neepawa): Dan Mazier (CPC)
  - MLA (Swan River): Rick Wowchuk (PC)

Area
  - Total: 10.81 km^{2} (4.17 sq mi)
- Elevation: 251 m (823 ft)

Population (2021)
  - Total: 350
- Time zone: UTC-6 (CST)
  - Summer (DST): UTC-5 (CDT)

Duck Bay is a community located in the Canadian province of Manitoba, along the western shores of Lake Winnipegosis.

The primary industry of the community is fishing, trapping and some agriculture. The Duck Bay wharf provides berthing for 15–20 skiffs and 3–5 whitefish vessels.

The inhabitants of the community once called Baie de Canard (French for Duck Bay) are mostly Métis of Ojibway and French ancestry.

== History ==
Duck Bay was established at the turn of the century as a Hudson's Bay Company trading post, and is named after the bay on which it is situated. A gravel road to Camperville, Manitoba was completed in 1952 (now known as Provincial Road 272).

A mystery surrounds the death of Father Darveau O.M.I. His body was found on the shore near the village of Duck Bay and a monument marks the site. He either drowned accidentally or was murdered. The monument reads "Here was found the body of Rev. Fr. J. E. Darveau Missionary, born 1816 Massacred June 4, 1844". Another larger monument on the grounds of the Roman Catholic mission in Camperville reads "In memory of the Rev. J. E. Darveau, missionary. Born in Quebec, 17 March 1816. Massacred 22 miles north 4 June 1844".

== Demographics ==
In the 2021 Census of Population conducted by Statistics Canada, Duck Bay had a population of 350 living in 111 of its 117 total private dwellings, a change of −6.4% from its 2016 population of 374. With a land area of 10.81 km^{2} (4.17 sq mi), it had a population density of 32.4/km^{2} (83.9/sq mi) in 2021.
