= The Narrows, Manitoba =

The Narrows
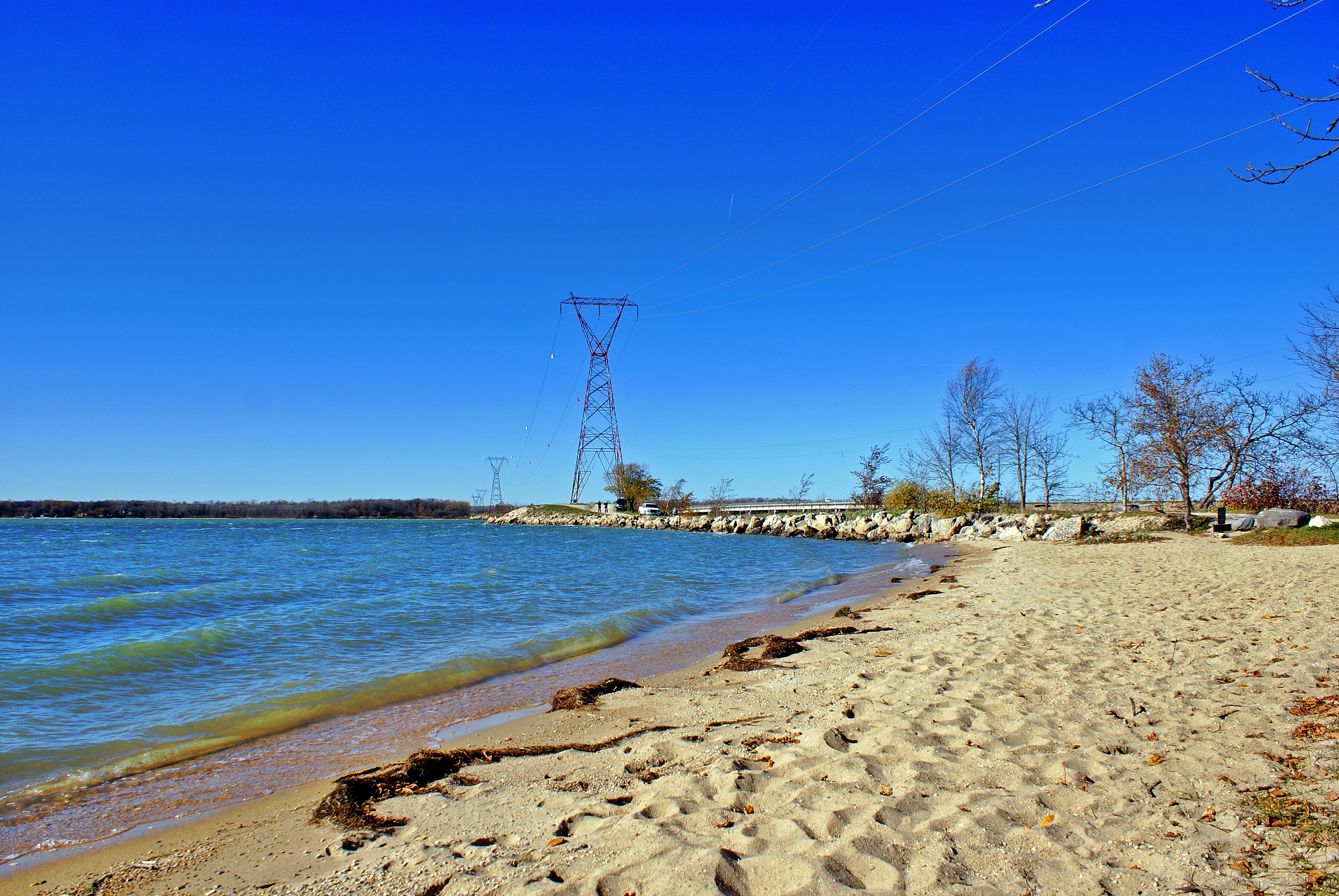
- The view of The Narrows from the beach

- Location of The Narrows in Manitoba
- Coordinates: 51°04′54″N 98°46′46″W
- Country: Canada
- Province: Manitoba
- Region: Interlake
- Census Division: No. 18
- Rural municipality: West Interlake
- Time zone: UTC−6 (CST)
  - Summer (DST): UTC−5 (CDT)
- Area code: 204
- NTS Map: 062O02
- GNBC Code: GBBNR

The Narrows is an unincorporated community in the Interlake region of Manitoba, Canada, situated on the northern part of Lake Manitoba within the Rural Municipality of West Interlake.

It is notable as the only place where Lake Manitoba can be crossed by bridge, the Lake Manitoba Narrows Bridge, which was built in the late 1960s.

There are two Lake St. Martin First Nation reserves (The Narrows 49 and Narrows 49 A) located in the surrounding areas.

A site on the west side of The Narrows is believed to be the only thunderbird nest in western Manitoba, although several occur in eastern Manitoba.

== History ==
Itself a narrow stretch of water where southern and northern basins come together at Lake Manitoba, The Narrows is believed to be where inspiration for the province's name came.

First Nations groups in the area knew an island to the north as Manitou Island. In stormy weather, the wind and waves crashing on the limestone cliffs on the north end of the island created an eerie drumming sound, which the Indigenous Peoples believed to be the sound of a huge drum beaten by Manitou, the Great Spirit.

As such, Indigenous people knew these waters as Manito bau or Manito wapaw, Cree for the 'narrows of the Great Spirit' or 'the Spirits’ Narrows'.

In 1738, the lake was named lac des Prairies by La Vérendrye. In 1868, Thomas Spence of Portage la Prairie attempted to create a republic outside the District of Assiniboia to be named the Republic of Manitobah. While his republic was short-lived, a year later when he joined Louis Riel’s council at Fort Garry, Spence’s choice was selected as the name of the new province, and the letter 'H' was dropped.

In 1896, a post office was opened at a location on 14-24-10W.

The post office service was terminated in 1958. A school district was located on SE 24-24-10W as well.
