= Rainbow Beach Provincial Park =

Provincial park in Manitoba, Canada

Coordinates: 51°07′44″N 99°48′49″W

Rainbow Beach Provincial Park is a provincial park on Dauphin Lake, located in Manitoba, Canada. It has seasonal camping available, both serviced and unserviced. It is located 17,5 km east of Dauphin, Manitoba, in the Rural Municipality of Lakeshore.

== See also ==
- List of Manitoba parks
