= Rural Municipality of Eriksdale =

Rural municipality in Manitoba, Canada

Coordinates: 50°51′35″N 98°13′38″W

The Rural Municipality of Eriksdale is a former rural municipality (RM) in the Canadian province of Manitoba. It was incorporated as a rural municipality on 22 March 1918. It ceased on 1 January 2015 as a result of its provincially mandated amalgamation with the RM of Siglunes to form the Municipality of West Interlake.

== Communities ==
- Deerhorn
- Eriksdale
- Scotch Bay
