= Eriksdale, Manitoba =

Eriksdale
- Location of Eriksdale in Manitoba
- Coordinates: 50°51′46″N 98°6′4″W
- Country: Canada
- Province: Manitoba
- Region: Interlake
- Census Division: No. 18
- First Settled: 1905
- Named after: Jonas Erik Erikson

Government
  - MP: James Bezan
  - MLA: Derek Johnson
  - Reeve: Arnthor Jonasson
- Time zone: UTC−6 (CST)
  - Summer (DST): UTC−5 (CDT)
- Postal Code: R0C 0W0
- Area code: 204
- NTS Map: 062J16
- GNBC Code: GAHUP

Eriksdale is an unincorporated community located in the Interlake Region of central Manitoba, Canada, near the eastern shore of Lake Manitoba. The community is located on the crossroads of Highway 6 and Highway 68, approximately 118 km (73 mi) north of Winnipeg. It is now a part of the Rural Municipality of West Interlake.

== History ==
The first white settlers in the area now known as Eriksdale were from Sweden and began arriving in 1905. They mostly arrived via Oak Point, which was the end of the rail line at the time.

Two names were originally proposed for the community, Lairdsville, after the Laird brothers who established the first boarding house in the town and Erikson, after Jonas Erik Erikson, the first settler in the area and who originally owned the land for the townsite. As the name of Erickson was already taken by another town in Manitoba, it was decided to instead name the community Eriksdale.

Homesteaders were promised good land and cheap prices; they instead found largely stony marshy land that was difficult to farm. Those who stayed adapted, and the land had plenty of game, fowl, fish, berries, good water, and wood for shelter and warmth. Entrepreneurs saw the opportunity for development of business to serve the homesteaders, and soon roads were built along with schools and churches.

A creamery was built in 1912, but shut down in 1990 and converted into a museum in 1995.

The R.M. of Eriksdale was formed in 1918, but was merged with the R.M. of Siglunes to form the R.M. of West Interlake in 2015.

== Industry ==
Agriculture and its related businesses continue to be the major economic activity in the Western Interlake. The relatively low land prices, the ability of this land to produce high-quality forage crops, the abundance of clean water, and the stable cattle prices have combined to make this area one of the best beef-producing areas in the country. The major products produced in this region are agricultural products, specifically grain, hay, forage seed, livestock and PMU (Pregnant Mares Urine). The production of cattle is perhaps the most important agricultural sector in the Western Interlake. Cattle farmers in the R. M. of Eriksdale Agriculture District (the Agriculture District includes Eriksdale, Coldwell and St. Laurent) managed approximately 44,917 cattle in 2001, of which 15,781 were beef and dairy cows. The majority of cattle produced locally are feeder cattle and are purchased by feedlots in Manitoba, Saskatchewan, Alberta, Ontario and the United States. Veterinary clinics are located in Lundar and Ashern, providing services for small and large animals. The R. M. of Eriksdale reported $7,282,337 in Farm Cash Receipts in 2000.

The local fishing industry is very active during the winter months. Commercial fishing on Lake Manitoba remains a major source of income for some residents. The fishermen of Eriksdale bring their catch to one of the local co‑ops, which act as regional marketing agents for the Freshwater Fish Marketing Corporation. They pack and send the fish to Winnipeg for processing.

The Eriksdale Consumers Co‑op was formed in the early 1950s. In January 2006 Arborg Co-op and Eriksdale Co-op amalgamated to form the Interlake Consumers Co-op. Presently there are approximately 1270 participating members. The Co‑op sells groceries, hardware, clothing, farm supplies and fuel.

The Eriksdale Credit Union Ltd. was established in 1972 with three employees. A new head office was completed in November, 1998. The 7,200 square foot building has a full service automated teller machine (ATM). Branches of the Eriksdale Credit Union Ltd.also had branches in Ashern and Moosehorn. In 2010 Eriksdale Credit Union Ltd. became Noventis Credit Union with branches in Arborg, Ashern, Fisher Branch, Gimli, Moosehorn, Riverton, and Winnipeg Beach.

== Arts and culture ==
Eriksdale Winter Carnival is held annually mid-February. Events include a curling bonspiel, an ice show, and the crowning of the carnival queen.

The Corn Roast is held on the long weekend of September. The first corn roast was held in 1954 at Art and Lucy Lindell's barn. There was a Saturday night dance planned for Labour Day weekend, unfortunately there was a boxing match in community that night. After some convincing Art agreed to hold a Corn Roast instead. On Sunday evening the Corn Roast was held from 10p.m. to 12p.m. with a midnight dance to follow. The event turned out to be a success and was held annually with around 400 admissions each year; it was usually the last event of the season. The Corn Roast turned out to be profitable each year; the only problem was some years it was difficult to locate the 1,200 to 1,500 good corn cobs. There was plenty of food served each year including sandwiches, homemade bread and buns, garden tomatoes, pickles, cakes, cookies and coffee.

The Bull-O-Rama is held in October and features a rodeo with a cowboy social that night.

Eriksdale Talent Night is held every second year; with help from CFRY, the night showcases local talent.

Creamery Days are held on the third weekend in August. Fresh cheese and butter were the products made from the milk once delivered to the Eriksdale Museum, the only complete creamery remaining today in Manitoba. The day features a parade, live entertainment, and a dance.

Eriksdale Dance Troupe Recital is held every Mother's Day weekend. Dance classes are taught by staff from the Royal Winnipeg Ballet every Monday at Eriksdale School. Classes begin in September and run until May of each year. The Eriksdale Dance Troupe was formed in 1999 by Dolly Lindell and offers classes in Ballet, Tap and Jazz. Manitoba Hydro is a sponsor of the Royal Winnipeg Ballet Satellite Program.

The Brody and Carlos Memorial Hockey Tournament is held the first weekend of February every year, it includes 2 days of hockey, silent auction and beer gardens. This tournament is held in honour of Brody Gleich, who died in early 2012 from a car accident and Carlos Insaurralde who passed in mid 2023 due to complications from surgery. The tournament is held by family and friends that knew the pair and hold this event to both honour and remember them.

== Politics ==
Eriksdale is a part of the federal riding of Selkirk-Interlake-Eastman, represented by Conservative MP James Bezan and the provincial riding of Interlake-Gimli, represented by Progressive Conservative MLA Derek Johnson. Eriksdale is a part of the R.M. of West Interlake, with Arnthor Jonasson as its reeve.

== Notable people ==
- Ted Green, former professional hockey player and two time Stanley Cup winner
- John Stewart, former professional hockey player
