= Duck Mountain Provincial Forest =

Forest in Saskatchewan and Manitoba, Canada

Coordinates: 51°39′25″N 101°04′44″W

The Duck Mountain Provincial Forest is located on the Saskatchewan / Manitoba border. The forest sits atop the Duck Mountains, which rise 200-500m above the surrounding prairie, and are part of the larger Manitoba Escarpment.

Both Manitoba's Duck Mountain Provincial Park and Saskatchewan's Duck Mountain Provincial Park are contained within the forest. The majority of the forest is located in Manitoba's Census Division No. 20, but substantial portions of the forest lie in the rural municipalities of Ethelbert, Roblin, Grandview, Swan Valley West, Minitonas – Bowsman, and Mountain, and in Saskatchewan's rural municipalities of Cote and St. Phillips.

The forest is designated as a provincial forest on both sides of the border. The Manitoba portion of the forest has an area of 3,770 km^{2} (1,455 sq mi), which includes all of the park's area of 1,424 km^{2} (550 sq mi). The forest was established in 1906. It is the largest Provincial Forest in Manitoba, slightly larger than the next largest Swan-Pelican Provincial Forest.

Duck Mountain Provincial Forest is surrounded by agricultural land, making it an important protected area for numerous species, including some under Manitoba's Endangered Species and Ecosystems Act. The forest was historically shaped by frequent fires. Soil found in this area has a disproportionately high amount of carbon relative to trees.

Logging is permitted in Manitoba's portion of the provincial forest and provincial park by Louisiana-Pacific Corporation. The decision to extend this logging permit was heavily criticized by environmentalist, including by the Pine Creek First Nation. An audit published by Wilderness Committee uncovered numerous logging concerns that broke provincial forest use regulation and could result in biodiversity loss.

== See also ==
- List of Manitoba provincial forests
- Forests of Canada
- List of Saskatchewan provincial forests
