= Lundar Beach Provincial Park =

Provincial park in Manitoba, Canada

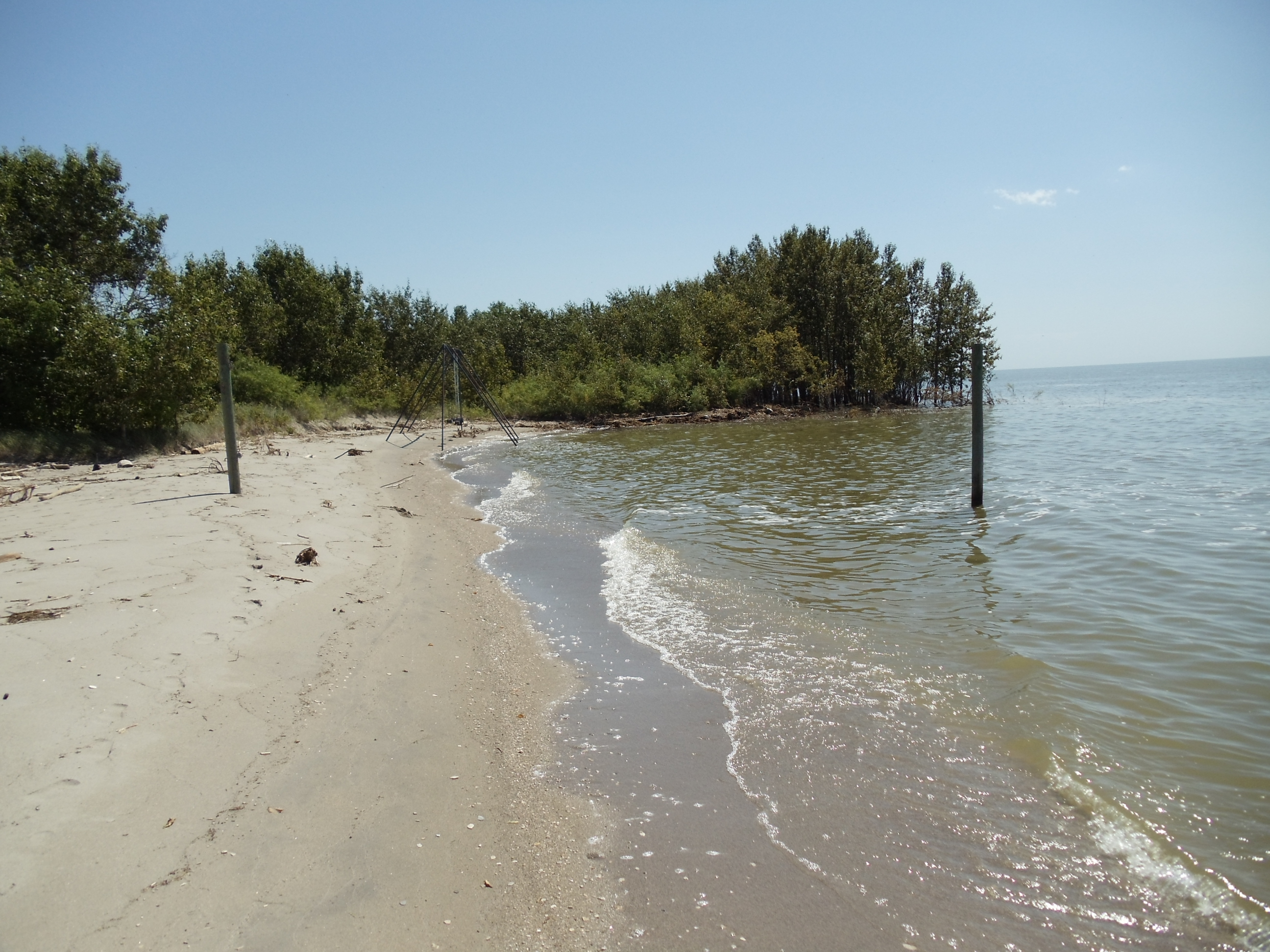
- Lundar Beach

- Location within Manitoba
- Interactive map of Lundar Beach Provincial Park
- Location: Manitoba, Canada
- Nearest city: Lundar
- Coordinates: 50°43′27″N 98°16′22″W
- Area: 0.234 km^{2} (0.090 sq mi)
- Established: 1961
- Governing body: Manitoba Parks

Lundar Beach Provincial Park is a provincial park on the east shore of Lake Manitoba in Manitoba, Canada. It is located in the Rural Municipality of Coldwell, 18 kilometres west of Lundar, Manitoba.

The park contains a campground with 41 spots, a 3.2 km hiking trail, boat launch, a playground and sporting/games areas. The campground is placed along the sand beach with 19 of the sites having direct access to the beach. As well, there is a public beach to the north of the campground.

This section of the lake is also home to many lakefront cabins. They however are not incorporated into the provincial park. The 50 cabins of Lundar Beach are found to the north ending at Sandy Point. Although they share a name with the park, they are not incorporated into it. To the south, Sugar Point is home to roughly 55 cabins, ending at their namesake of Sugar Point.

Part of 2009 film Whiteout was filmed in the provincial park.

== See also ==
- List of Manitoba parks
