= Ochre River, Manitoba =

Ochre River
- Local urban district
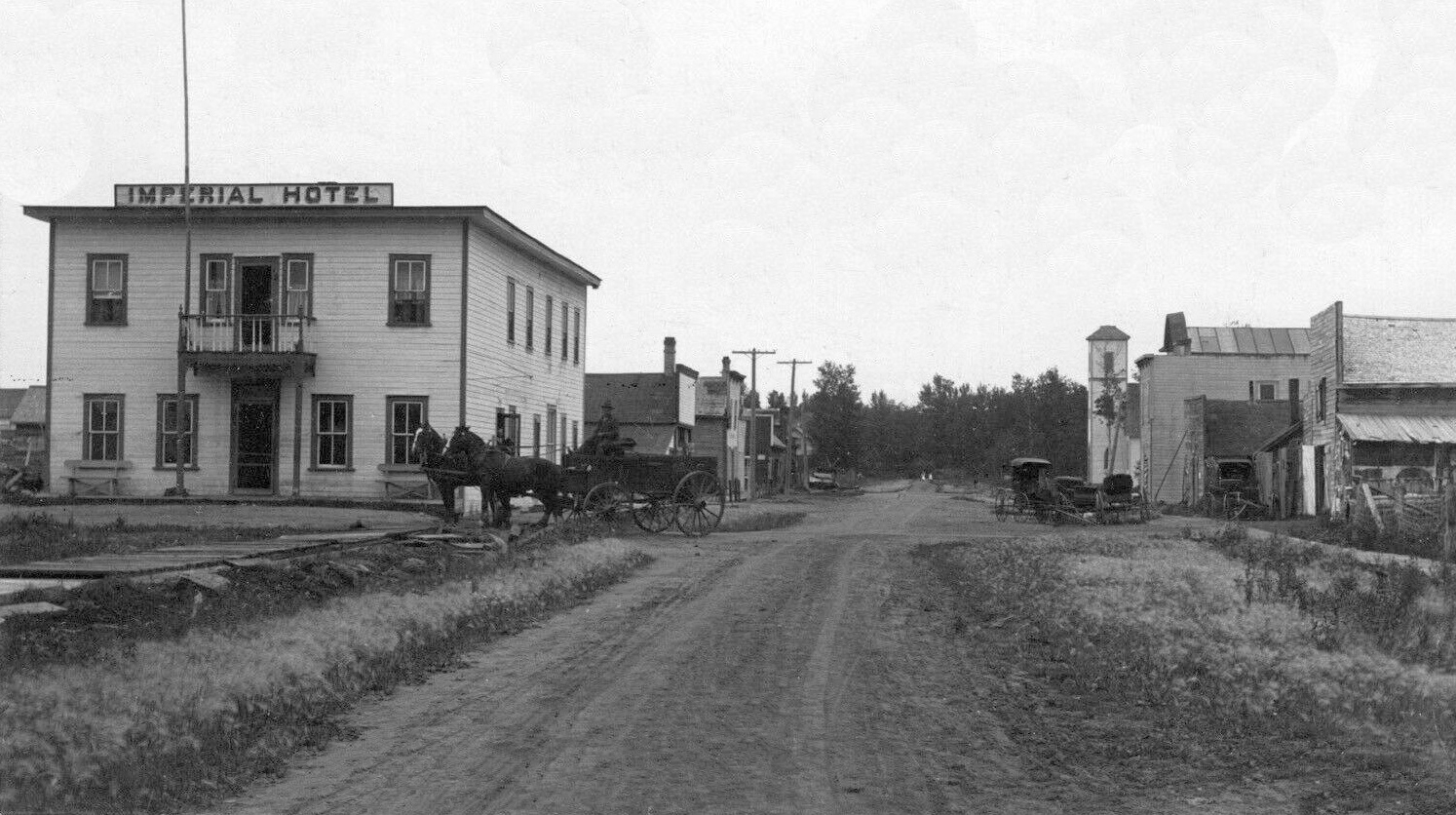
- Ochre River, 1910

- Location within Manitoba
- Coordinates: 51.06222°N 99.78000°W
- Country: Canada
- Province: Manitoba
- Municipality: RM of Lakeshore
- Founded: 1893
- Founder: Douglas Thompson (May 12, 1854 – March 23, 1938)

Ochre River is a local urban district in the Rural Municipality of Lakeshore, Manitoba, Canada, approximately halfway between the City of Dauphin and Ste. Rose du Lac.

It was founded by Sir Douglas Thompson (May 12, 1854 – March 23, 1938) in 1893 as a farming community; many of the buildings have survived since.

Located within the community is Ochre River railway station, which is served by Via Rail's Winnipeg–Churchill train.

The community also has a post office, hotel, school, community centre, and a municipality office.

The community holds a yearly festival called "Country Daze".
