= Rural Municipality of Coldwell =

Rural municipality in Manitoba, Canada

Coldwell
- Rural municipality
- Rural Municipality of Coldwell
- Location of Coldwell in Manitoba
- Coordinates: 50°38′20″N 98°02′30″W
- Country: Canada
- Province: Manitoba
- Region: Interlake
- Incorporated: November 19, 1912

Area
  - Total: 891.85 km^{2} (344.35 sq mi)

Population (2021)
  - Total: 1,313
  - Density: 1.472/km^{2} (3.813/sq mi)
- Time zone: UTC-6 (CST)
  - Summer (DST): UTC-5 (CDT)

The Rural Municipality of Coldwell is a rural municipality in the Interlake Region of the province of Manitoba in Western Canada. The principal community within the boundaries is Lundar.

== History ==
The rural municipality was named for George Robson Coldwell, a member of the provincial legislature from 1907 to 1915. It was incorporated on November 19, 1912.

== Communities ==
- Clarkleigh
- Lundar
- Lundyville
- Otto
- Vestfold

== Government ==
The Rural Municipality has a municipal style government with four councillors and one head of council, known as the mayor, as well as a deputy mayor. The four councillors represent the municipality at large. Within the borders of the municipality is the Local Urban District of Lundar, which itself has three councillors.

=== Members ===
The council of the Rural Municipality of Coldwell is composed of:

- Mayor: Brian Sigfusson
- Councillor/Deputy Mayor: Virgil Johnson
- Councillor: Greg Brown
- Councillor: Jim Scharf
- Councillor: Kent Kostyshyn

== Climate ==
Climate data for Lundar
Month	Jan	Feb	Mar	Apr	May	Jun	Jul	Aug	Sep	Oct	Nov	Dec	Year
Record high °C (°F)	7 (45)	7 (45)	14 (57)	28 (82)	34 (93)	37 (99)	34 (93)	38.5 (101.3)	38 (100)	29 (84)	15.5 (59.9)	9 (48)	38.5 (101.3)
Mean daily maximum °C (°F)	−12.7 (9.1)	−8 (18)	−1.3 (29.7)	9.4 (48.9)	17.7 (63.9)	22.8 (73.0)	24.7 (76.5)	24.7 (76.5)	17.7 (63.9)	9.7 (49.5)	−2.1 (28.2)	−9.8 (14.4)	7.7 (45.9)
Daily mean °C (°F)	−18.1 (−0.6)	−13.5 (7.7)	−6.6 (20.1)	3.3 (37.9)	10.9 (51.6)	16.4 (61.5)	18.3 (64.9)	17.7 (63.9)	11.3 (52.3)	4.4 (39.9)	−6.5 (20.3)	−14.6 (5.7)	1.9 (35.4)
Mean daily minimum °C (°F)	−23.6 (−10.5)	−18.8 (−1.8)	−11.9 (10.6)	−2.9 (26.8)	4.1 (39.4)	9.9 (49.8)	11.9 (53.4)	10.6 (51.1)	4.9 (40.8)	−1.1 (30.0)	−10.8 (12.6)	−19.4 (−2.9)	−3.9 (25.0)
Record low °C (°F)	−44 (−47)	−45.5 (−49.9)	−39.5 (−39.1)	−28 (−18)	−12 (10)	−2.5 (27.5)	0.5 (32.9)	−2.5 (27.5)	−7 (19)	−22 (−8)	−38 (−36)	−43.5 (−46.3)	−45.5 (−49.9)
Average precipitation mm (inches)	14.7 (0.58)	14.5 (0.57)	19.8 (0.78)	27.8 (1.09)	54.2 (2.13)	82.5 (3.25)	66.6 (2.62)	68.6 (2.70)	50.6 (1.99)	35.7 (1.41)	19.7 (0.78)	18.5 (0.73)	473.1 (18.63)
Source: Environment Canada

== Demographics ==
In the 2021 Census of Population conducted by Statistics Canada, Coldwell had a population of 1,313 living in 552 of its 734 total private dwellings, a change of 4.7% from its 2016 population of 1,254. With a land area of 891.85 km^{2} (344.35 sq mi), it had a population density of 1.5/km^{2} (3.8/sq mi) in 2021.

Historical population

Year	Pop.	±% p.a.
1901	1,134	—
1911	1,853	+5.03%
1921	2,257	+1.99%
1931	1,825	−2.10%
1941	1,933	+0.58%
1951	1,745	−1.02%
1956	1,858	+1.26%
1961	1,731	−1.41%
1966	1,669	−0.73%
1971	1,589	−0.98%

Year	Pop.	±% p.a.
1976	1,582	−0.09%
1981	1,472	−1.43%
1986	1,475	+0.04%
1991	1,394	−1.12%
1996	1,399	+0.07%
2001	1,320	−1.16%
2006	1,339	+0.29%
2011	1,351	+0.18%
2016	1,254	−1.48%
2021	1,313	+0.92%
