= Camperville, Manitoba =

Canadian community

Coordinates: 51°59′18″N 100°08′34″W

Location of Camperville in Manitoba

Camperville is a community in the Canadian province of Manitoba.

Camperville's residents are mainly Métis. It is situated on the western shore of Lake Winnipegosis. Manitoba Highway 20 (Northern Woods and Water Route East Branch) passes through the village.

Local economy includes salt mining, tourism, hunting, fishing and trapping.

== History ==
The community was named for Father C.J. Camper, an early Roman Catholic missionary. Nearby community Pine Creek First Nation had a church built 1906–1910, which was subsequently destroyed in 1930 but was rebuilt, as the walls of the old church were reusable. However, one can easily distinguish between the two because the first church had a two-storey steeple while the steeple on the second was only one storey.

== Demographics ==
In the 2021 Census of Population conducted by Statistics Canada, it was first reported that Camperville had a population of 90 living in 49 of its 51 total private dwellings, a change of -81.5% from its 2016 population of 487. However, revised data published by Statistics Canada in 2023 reported that the actual 2021 population was 424 inhabitants living in 174 of its 176 private dwellings. With a land area of 8.7 km^{2} (3.4 sq mi), it had a population density of 48.7/km^{2} (126.2/sq mi) in 2021.

== See also ==
- Pine Creek First Nation
- Duck Bay, Manitoba
