= Manitoba Provincial Road 276 =

Provincial Road in Manitoba, Canada

Provincial Road 276
- PR 276 highlighted in red

Route information
- Maintained by Department of Infrastructure
- Length: 114.3 km (71.0 mi)
- Existed: 1966–present

Major junctions
- South end: PTH 5 in Ste. Rose du Lac
- PR 364 near Rorketon; PR 269 near Meadow Portage; PR 328 at Waterhen
- North end: Skownan First Nation

Location
- Country: Canada
- Province: Manitoba
- Rural municipalities: Ste. Rose, Lakeshore

Highway system
- Provincial highways in Manitoba; Winnipeg City Routes
← PR 275	→ PR 278

Provincial Road 276 (PR 276) is a 114.3-kilometre-long (71.0 mi) north–south highway in the Parkland Region of Manitoba. It connects the towns of Ste. Rose du Lac, Rorketon, Toutes Aides, and Waterhen, as well as providing the only road access to the hamlet of Rock Ridge and the Skownan First Nation along the shores of Waterhen Lake. PR 276 also travels past Manipogo Provincial Park and traverses the entire length of the Isthmus separating Lake Winnipegosis and Lake Manitoba.

== Route description ==
PR 276 begins in the Municipality of Ste. Rose at an intersection with PTH 5 (Parks Route / Northern Woods and Water Route) in Ste. Rose du Lac, along the east bank of the Turtle River. It heads north along Central Avenue to travel through the centre of downtown before passing through some neighbourhoods. Leaving Ste. Rose du Lac, the highway traverses a switchback as it crosses Hansen Creek just prior to entering the Rural Municipality of Lakeshore, having intersections with access roads to Methley Beach, East Bay, Magnet, and Million before going through a second switchback. PR 276 meets the southern end of PR 364 just east of Rorketon at the locality of Edillen before crossing PR 481 and Bretecher Creek as it travels through Toutes Aides. After curving around the west side of Manipogo Provincial Park, the road leaves the Rural Municipalities behind, heading up the Isthmus separating Lake Manitoba and Lake Winnipegosis, travelling through the community of Spence Lake and having a junction with PR 269. Leaving the isthmus behind, the highway winds its way up the western banks on the Waterhen River, meeting the west end of PR 328 at the town of Waterhen. Following the river northward, PR 276 travels through woodland as it travels past the hamlet of Rock Ridge before entering the Skownan First Nation, serving as the main road through the Waterhen 45 Indian reserve before coming to a dead end along the shores of Waterhen Lake. The entire length of PR 276 is a paved two-lane highway.

== Major intersections ==
Division	Location	km	mi	Destinations	Notes
Ste. Rose	Ste. Rose du Lac	0.0	0.0	PTH 5 (Parks Route / Northern Woods and Water Route) – McCreary, Dauphin	Southern terminus; road continues south as Old No. 5 South (Road 88W)
Ste. Rose		6.8	4.2	Bridge over Hansen Creek	
Lakeshore		17.6	10.9	Road 149N – Methley Beach	Former PR 480 south
Lakeshore		24.1	15.0	East Bay Road (Road 153N) – East Bay	
Lakeshore		29.0	18.0	Magnet Road – Magnet	
Lakeshore		30.2	18.8	Million Road (Road 156N) – Million	Former PR 585 west
Lakeshore	Edillen	40.2	25.0	PR 364 north – Rorketon	Southern terminus of PR 364
Lakeshore	Toutes Aides	49.8	30.9	PR 481 east – Crane River	Southern end of PR 481 concurrency
Lakeshore	Toutes Aides	49.9	31.0	Bridge over Bretcher Creek	
Lakeshore	Toutes Aides	50.0	31.1	PR 481 west – Fork River	Northern end of PR 481 concurrency
Lakeshore		54.7	34.0	Manipogo Beach Road – Manipogo Provincial Park	
No. 19		70.2	43.6	PR 269 west – Winnipegosis	Eastern terminus of PR 269
No. 19	Waterhen	95.2	59.2	PR 328 east – Gypsumville	Western terminus of PR 328
No. 19	Skownan First Nation	108.7	67.5	Salt Point Road – Salt Point	
No. 19	Skownan First Nation	114.3	71.0	Dead end at Waterhen Lake	Northern terminus
1.000 mi = 1.609 km; 1.000 km = 0.621 mi: Concurrency terminus
