= Manitoba Provincial Road 364 =

Provincial Road in Manitoba, Canada

Provincial Road 364
- PR 364 highlighted in red

Route information
- Maintained by Department of Infrastructure
- Length: 54.3 km (33.7 mi)
- Existed: 1966–present

Major junctions
- South end: PR 276 near Rorketon
- PR 481 at Weiden; PR 269 at Rice Lake
- North end: PTH 20 near Winnipegosis

Location
- Country: Canada
- Province: Manitoba
- Rural municipalities: Lakeshore, Mossey River

Highway system
- Provincial highways in Manitoba; Winnipeg City Routes
← PR 363	→ PR 365

Provincial Road 364 (PR 364) is a 54.3-kilometre-long (33.7 mi) north–south highway in the Parkland Region of Manitoba, connecting the towns of Rorketon and Winnipegosis via running along the northern coastline of Dauphin Lake.

== Route description ==
PR 364 begins in the Rural Municipality of Lakeshore at an intersection with PR 276 just east of Rorketon, heading due west as a paved two-lane highway through the northern side of town, skirting along the edge of downtown before the asphalt turns to gravel as the road leaves Rorketon and heads through a mix of farmland and wooded areas. It makes a sharp right turn before traveling through Weiden at an intersection with PR 481, making a sharp left here to travel along the boundary with the Rural Municipality of Mossey River for a few kilometres. The highway fully enters the RM of Mossey River as it skirts along the northern coastline of Dauphin Lake, passing through Oak Brae before turning due north to run concurrently with PR 269; the highway becomies paved once more as the pair travel through the community of Rice Lake. PR 364 now splits off and curves westward near the shores of Lake Winnipegosis, crossing a bridge over the Mossey River before coming to an end just south of the town of Winnipegosis at an intersection with PTH 20 (Northern Woods and Water Route East Branch).

== Major intersections ==
Division	Location	km	mi	Destinations	Notes
Lakeshore	Edillen	0.0	0.0	PR 276 – Toutes Aides, Ste. Rose du Lac	Southern terminus; road continues east as Abbotshall Road
Lakeshore	Rorketon	4.5	2.8	Railway Avenue	Pavement ends
Lakeshore		8.1	5.0	Road 93W	Former PR 585 east
Lakeshore–Mossey River boundary	Weiden	19.5	12.1	PR 481 east – Toutes Aides	Western terminus of PR 481
Mossey River	Rice Lake	38.6	24.0	PR 269 west – Fork River	Southern end of PR 269 concurrency; pavement begins
Mossey River		45.1	28.0	PR 269 east – Meadow Portage	Northern end of PR 269 concurrency
Mossey River		53.4	33.2	Bridge Street – Winnipegosis	
Mossey River		53.7– 53.9	33.4– 33.5	Bridge over the Mossey River	
Mossey River		54.3	33.7	PTH 20 (NWWR East Branch) – Dauphin, Winnipegosis	Northern terminus; road continues west as Road 180N
1.000 mi = 1.609 km; 1.000 km = 0.621 mi: Concurrency terminus
