= Manitoba Provincial Road 481 =

Provincial road in Manitoba, Canada

Provincial Road 481

Route information
- Maintained by Department of Infrastructure
- Length: 94.2 km (58.5 mi)
- Existed: 1966–present

Major junctions
- West end: PR 364 in Weiden
- PR 276 in Toutes Aides
- East end: PTH 68 in Eddystone

Location
- Country: Canada
- Province: Manitoba
- Rural municipalities: Mossey River, Lakeshore, Alonsa

Highway system
- Provincial highways in Manitoba; Winnipeg City Routes
← PR 480	→ PR 482

Provincial Road 481 (PR 481) is a 94.2-kilometre-long (58.5 mi) east–west highway in the Parkland Region of Manitoba. It connects the towns of Toutes Aides, Crane River, and Eddystone with the O-Chi-Chak-Ko-Sipi First Nation and the northwestern coastline of Lake Manitoba.

== Route description ==
PR 481 begins on the boundary between the Rural Municipalities of Mossey River and Lakeshore at an intersection with PR 364 in the hamlet of Weiden. Travelling through a mix of farmland and wooded areas, it heads north for a short distance before curving due eastward and intersects PR 490 a short time later. After a few kilometres, the highway enters Toutes Aides, travelling along the south side of town as it shares a short concurrency with PR 276 and crosses a couple of creeks. Leaving Toutes Aides, PR 481 heads northeast via a couple switchbacks through wooded areas before meeting the coastline of Lake Manitoba as it enters the town of Crane River, turning sharply southward as it travels through town. It then crosses a bridge over the Crane River to leave the town and enter the neighbouring O-Chi-Chak-Ko-Sipi First Nation, almost immediately making an abrupt right turn to travel southward through neighbourhoods along the riverbank. The highway heads south through remote woodlands for several kilometres to join the coastline again, now winding its way southeast through farmland to pass through the communities of Guynemer, Cayer, and Moore Dale, before coming to an end at a junction with PTH 68 (Northern Woods and Water Route) just as its entering the hamlet of Eddystone. Excluding the short concurrency with PR 276 in Toutes Aides, the entire length of PR 481 is a gravel, two-lane highway.

== Major intersections ==
Division	Location	km	mi	Destinations	Notes
Mossey River–Lakeshore boundary	Weiden	0.0	0.0	PR 364 – Rorketon, Winnipegosis	Western terminus
Lakeshore		8.0	5.0	PR 490 north – Meadow Portage	Southern terminus
Lakeshore	Toutes Aides	16.0	9.9	PR 276 north – Meadow Portage	Western end of PR 276 concurrency
Lakeshore	Toutes Aides	16.1	10.0	Bridge over Bretecher Creek	
Lakeshore	Toutes Aides	16.2	10.1	PR 276 – Ste. Rose du Lac	Eastern end of PR 276 concurrency
Lakeshore		17.0	10.6	Bridge over Dufauts Creek	
No. 19	Crane River–O-Chi-Chak-Ko-Sipi First Nation boundary	43.8	27.2	Bridge over the Crane River	
Alonsa	Eddystone	94.2	58.5	PTH 68 (NWWR) – Eriksdale, Ste. Rose du Lac	Eastern terminus; former PR 235
1.000 mi = 1.609 km; 1.000 km = 0.621 mi: Concurrency terminus
