= Manitoba Provincial Road 269 =

Provincial Road in Manitoba, Canada

Provincial Road 269
- Northern Woods and Water Route West Branch
- PR 269 highlighted in red

Route information
- Maintained by Department of Infrastructure
- Length: 72.8 km (45.2 mi)
- Existed: 1966–present

Major junctions
- West end: PTH 10 near Ethelbert
- PTH 20 in Fork River; PR 364 in Rice Lake
- East end: PR 276 near Meadow Portage

Location
- Country: Canada
- Province: Manitoba
- Rural municipalities: Ethelbert, Mossey River

Highway system
- Provincial highways in Manitoba; Winnipeg City Routes
← PR 268	→ PR 270

Provincial Road 269 (PR 269) is a 72.8-kilometre-long (45.2 mi) east–west highway in the Parkland Region of Manitoba. It connects the towns of Ethelbert and Fork River with PR 276 along the Isthmus separating Lake Winnipegosis from Lake Manitoba. Between Ethelbert and Fork River, PR 269 follows a portion of the western branch of the Northern Woods and Water Route.

== Route description ==
PR 269 begins in the Municipality of Ethelbert at an intersection with PTH 10 on the northern edge of the town of Ethelbert, heading east along a gravel bypass on the north side of town, following the west branch of the Northern Woods and Water Route (NWWR), which continues along PTH 10 northbound. It crosses the Fork River before meeting River Avenue N (former PR 269 through downtown), where it becomes paved and leaves Ethelbert. Entering the Rural Municipality of Mossey River, it parallels the Fork River for several kilometres as it traverses a mix of farmland and wooded areas to pass through Zelena and cross a creek. Joining both the NWWR mainline and a concurrency (overlap) with PTH 20, the pair head south through the town of Fork River, where they cross the Fork River for a second time, before PR 269 splits off and heads east to cross the Mossey River. Travelling through the locality of Rice Lake, the highway shares a concurrency with PR 364 before passing through community of Volga, where it crosses German Creek while travelling near the southern coastline of Lake Winnipegosis. Entering Unorganized Division No. 19, PR 269 makes a sharp left at a junction with PR 490 in Meadowlands to travel up the isthmus separating Lake Winnipegosis from Lake Manitoba, coming to an end at an intersection with PR 276.

== Major intersections ==
Division	Location	km	mi	Destinations	Notes
Ethelbert		0.0	0.0	PTH 10 (NWWR West Brach north) – Dauphin, Swan River	Western terminus; road continues west as Road 174N; western end of unpaved section; begins following west branch of NWWR
Ethelbert	Ethelbert	1.8	1.1	Bridge over the Fork River	
Ethelbert	Ethelbert	2.4	1.5	River Avenue N to PTH 10A – Ethelbert	Former PR 269 alignment through Ethelbert; eastern end of unpaved section
Mossey River	Zelena	14.2	8.8	Bridge over Zelena Creek	
Mossey River		29.2	18.1	PTH 20 north (NWWR East Branch north) – Winnipegosis	Western end of PTH 20 concurrency; southern terminus of both the west and east branches of NWWR; begins following NWWR mainline
Mossey River	Fork River	32.4	20.1	Bridge over the Fork River	
Mossey River	Fork River	32.5	20.2	PTH 20 south (NWWR south)	Eastern end of PTH 20 and NWWR concurrency
Mossey River		33.8	21.0	Bridge over the Mossey River	
Mossey River	Rice Lake	40.6	25.2	PR 364 south – Rorketon	Western end of PR 364 concurrency
Mossey River		47.1	29.3	PR 364 north – Winnipegosis	Eastern end of PR 364 concurrency
Mossey River	Volga	54.2	33.7	Bridge over German Creek	
No. 19	Meadowlands	61.7	38.3	PR 490 south – Toutes Aides	Northern terminus of PR 490
No. 19		72.8	45.2	PR 276 – Meadow Portage, Toutes Aides	Eastern terminus
1.000 mi = 1.609 km; 1.000 km = 0.621 mi: Concurrency terminus

== Related route ==
Provincial Road 490
- Location: Meadowlands - Toutes Aides
- Length: 12.8 km (8.0 mi)
- Existed: 1966–present

Provincial Road 490 (PR 490) is a 12.8-kilometre-long (8.0 mi) spur of PR 269 in both the Rural Municipality of Lakeshore and Unorganized Division No. 19, providing access to the town of Toutes Aides and the hamlet of Weiden. It is entirely a two-lane gravel road and runs along the western coastline of Spence Lake.

Division	Location	km	mi	Destinations	Notes
Lakeshore		0.0	0.0	PR 481 – Toutes Aides, Fork River	Southern terminus; road continues south as Road 93W
No. 19	Meadowlands	12.8	8.0	PR 269 – Meadow Portage, Winnipegosis	Northern terminus
1.000 mi = 1.609 km; 1.000 km = 0.621 mi
