= Manitoba Highway 60 =

Highway in Manitoba

Provincial Trunk Highway 60
- PTH 60 highlighted in red

Route information
- Maintained by Department of Infrastructure
- Length: 152 km (94 mi)
- Existed: 1987–present

Major junctions
- West end: PTH 10 north of Overflowing River Provincial Park
- East end: PTH 6 south of Grand Rapids

Location
- Country: Canada
- Province: Manitoba

Highway system
- Provincial highways in Manitoba; Winnipeg City Routes
← PTH 59	→ PTH 67

Provincial Trunk Highway 60 (PTH 60) is a provincial highway in the Canadian province of Manitoba. It runs from PTH 10 to PTH 6. Much of its length runs adjacent to the north shore of Lake Winnipegosis.

The route connects PTH 6 to PTH 10 and Flin Flon. The speed limit is 100 km/h (62 mph).

The highway is designated as a northern/remote route within Canada's National Highway System.

== Route description ==
PTH 60 begins in Division No. 21 at an intersection with PTH 10 (Northern Woods and Water Route) just a few kilometers north of Overflowing River Provincial Park. It winds its way southeast through remote wooded terrain for several kilometers, where it begins running on the northern coastline of Lake Winnipegosis, as well as traversing the Isthmus between it and Cedar Lake. After crossing into Division No. 19, the highway leaves the isthmus, though still running along Lake Winnipegosis, and enters the Chemawawin Cree Nation. Passing by several homes and an abandoned business (along adjacent 13 Mile Road), it has an intersection with PR 327, a spur road leading to Easterville. After having an intersection with a small gravel road leading to Denbeigh Point, PTH 60 finally leaves Lake Winnipegosis and the First Nation, winding its way east through remote woodlands for several kilometers, traveling past a few smaller lakes, such as Kaweenakumik Lake (signed as Kawinaw Lake) and Katimik Lake, before coming to an end at an intersection with PTH 6 a few kilometers south of Grand Rapids.

The entire length of Manitoba Highway 60 is a rural, paved, two-lane highway.

== History ==
Provincial Road 327
- Location: Easterville
- Length: 12.7 km (7.9 mi)
- Existed: 1966–present

Prior to PTH 60's designation in 1987, from the Easterville turn off eastward, the highway was a part of PR 327 which dates back to 1966. The rest of the route westward was an unnamed secondary road.

== Major intersection ==
Division	Location	km	mi	Destinations	Notes
No. 21		0.0	0.0	PTH 10 (NWWR) – Swan River, The Pas	Western terminus
No. 19	Chemawawin Cree Nation	108.6	67.5	PR 327 north – Easterville	Southern terminus of PR 327
No. 19	Chemawawin Cree Nation	110.5	68.7	Denbeigh Point	Access road to Denbeigh Point
No. 19		152	94	PTH 6 – Grand Rapids, Ashern	Eastern terminus
1.000 mi = 1.609 km; 1.000 km = 0.621 mi
