= Manitoba Provincial Road 327 =

Provincial road in Manitoba, Canada

Provincial Road 327
- PR 327 highlighted in red

Route information
- Maintained by Department of Infrastructure
- Length: 12.7 km (7.9 mi)
- Existed: 1966–present

Major junctions
- South end: PTH 60 near Chemawawin
- North end: Easterville

Location
- Country: Canada
- Province: Manitoba

Highway system
- Provincial highways in Manitoba; Winnipeg City Routes
← PR 326	→ PR 328

Provincial Road 327 (PR 327) is a provincial road in the Canadian province of Manitoba. It runs from Highway 60 to the town of Easterville in the Chemawawin 2 Indian reserve. The entire length of PR 327 is a paved, two-lane highway.

== History ==
PR 327 was established along its current alignment in 1966. Prior to PTH 60's establishment in 1987, PR 327 extended east along what is now PTH 60 to its junction with PTH 6 south of Grand Rapids. PR 327's original length was 56.1 kilometres (34.9 mi).

== Major intersections ==
Division	Location	km	mi	Destinations	Notes
No. 19	Chemawawin Cree Nation	0.0	0.0	PTH 60 – The Pas, Grand Rapids	Southern terminus
No. 19	Easterville	12.7	7.9	Docks on Cedar Lake	Dead end; northern terminus
1.000 mi = 1.609 km; 1.000 km = 0.621 mi
