= Fort Dauphin (Manitoba) =

- Winnipegosis, Manitoba
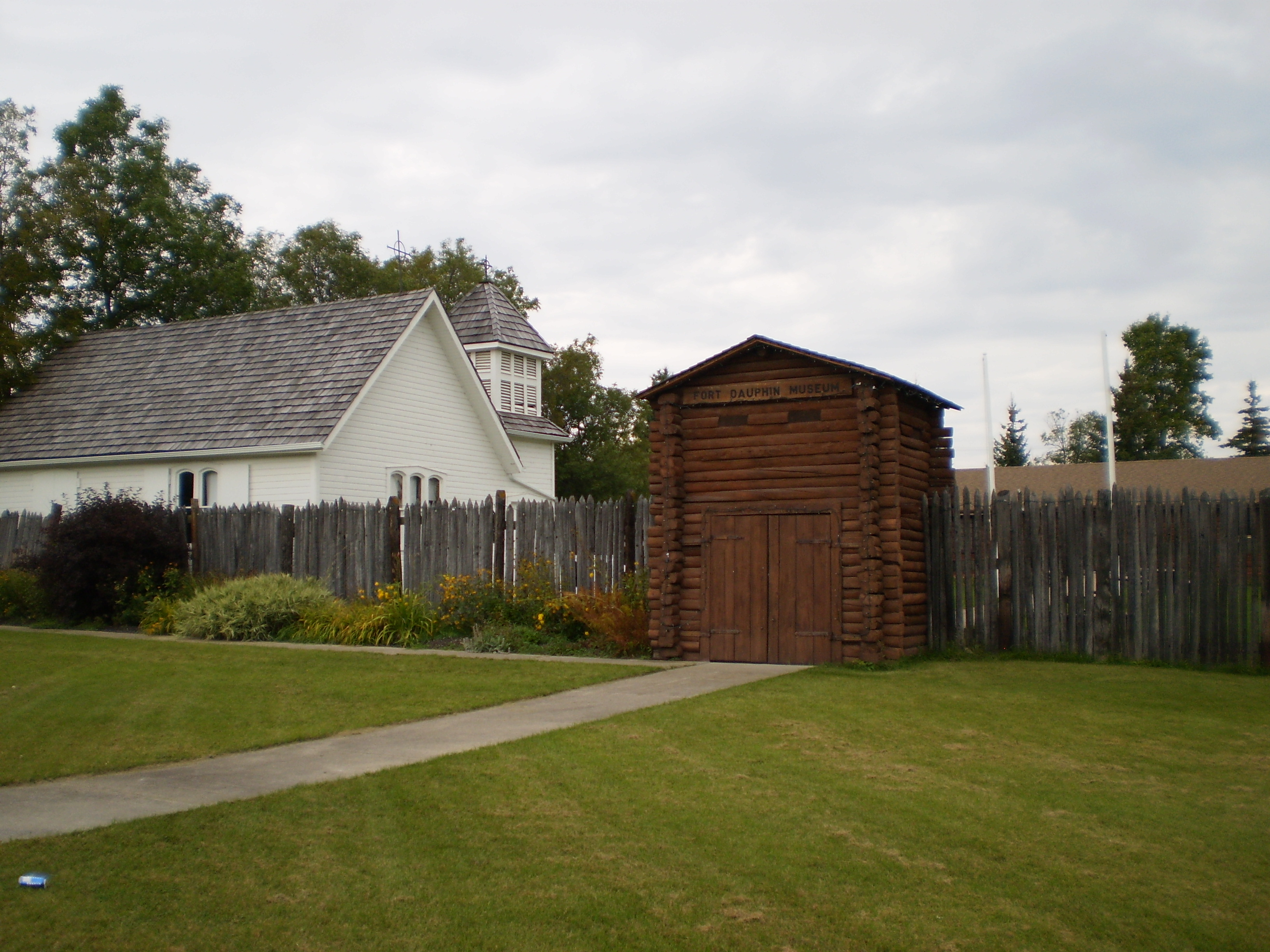
- Fort Dauphin Museum

Site information
- Type: Fort
- Controlled by: France, Canada

National Historic Site of Canada
- Official name: Fort Dauphin National Historic Site of Canada
- Designated: 1943

Location
- Coordinates: 51.6546°N 99.9238°W

Site history
- Built: 1741
- In use: 1741-?
- Materials: Wood

Fort Dauphin was the name of two forts in Manitoba.

The first Fort Dauphin was built in 1741 at the mouth of the Mossey River on Lake Winnipegosis (today in Winnipegosis) with Pierre Gaultier de La Vérendrye, the western French military commander, directing construction. The area provided a post located between the Assiniboine River and the Saskatchewan River. It was named for the Dauphin prince of France. This site was reused by John Best of the Hudson's Bay Company (HBC) in the winter of 1795-1796.

A second Fort Dauphin was built in 1767 on the north shore of Dauphin Lake, so both the fort and the lake had the same name. This fort was built by French fur traders after the era of the western military commanders. As with many of the forts of the times, they kept the same names while changing locations to facilitate trade with the First Nations and to secure better physical locations.

In 1817, the HBC established a post on the west side of Dauphin Lake, known as Dauphin, Fort Dauphin, or Dauphin Lake House. Two years later, it was moved closer to a North West Company (NWC) post on the lake. After the HBC and NWC merged in 1821, the HBC only kept the former NWC post in operation, but that one was also closed 3 years later to allow animal populations to recover. Afterwards, the location saw only sporadic use from 1827 to circa 1831, and from circa 1867 to circa 1870.

The site at Winnipegosis was designated a National Historic Site of Canada in 1943.
