= Fork River =

Fork River may refer to

- Fork River, Manitoba a settlement in Manitoba, Canada
- Fork River (New Zealand), a short river in New Zealand

== See also ==
- Big Fork River, a river of Minnesota
