= Manitoba Provincial Road 328 =

Provincial Road in Manitoba, Canada

Provincial Road 328
- PR 328 highlighted in red

Route information
- Maintained by Department of Infrastructure
- Length: 63.5 km (39.5 mi)
- Existed: 1966–present

Major junctions
- West end: PR 276 in Waterhen
- East end: PTH 6 near Gypsumville

Location
- Country: Canada
- Province: Manitoba
- Rural municipalities: Grahamdale

Highway system
- Provincial highways in Manitoba; Winnipeg City Routes
← PR 327	→ PR 329

Provincial Road 328 (PR 328) is a 63.5-kilometre-long (39.5 mi) east–west highway in the Interlake and NorMan regions of Manitoba, Canada. It connects the town of Waterhen with PTH 6 and the town of Gypsumville while running along the northern coast of Lake Manitoba.

== Route description ==
PR 328 begins in Waterhen at an intersection with PR 276 on the western edge of town. It heads east, immediately crossing a bridge over the Waterhen River and passing straight through the centre of town, where it has an intersection with North Mallard Road, which leads to the hamlet of Mallard. The highway turns from asphalt to gravel as it leaves Waterhen and begins following the northern coastline of Lake Manitoba, travelling through a mix of swamp and woodlands to cross a couple creeks and the Basket River. PR 328 has an intersection with an access road to Peonan Point (Peonan Point Road) before traveling through Homebrook, where it enters both farmland and the Rural Municipality of Grahamdale. Pulling away from the lake, the highway comes to an end shortly thereafter at an intersection PTH 6, with the road continuing east towards PR 513 as Batten Road (Road 188N).

== Major intersections ==
Division	Location	km	mi	Destinations	Notes
No. 19	Waterhen	0.0	0.0	PR 276 – Ste. Rose du Lac, Skownan	Western terminus
No. 19	Waterhen	0.1– 0.2	0.062– 0.12	Bridge over the Waterhen River	
No. 19	Waterhen	0.9	0.56	North Mallard Road – Mallard	
No. 19	Waterhen	1.8	1.1	Pavement ends	
No. 19		24.3	15.1	Bridge over Proulx Creek	
No. 19		40.7	25.3	Peonan Point Road – Peonan Point	
No. 19		48.5	30.1	Bridge over the Basket River	
No. 19	Homebrook	52.1	32.4	Bridge over Powderhorn Creek	
Grahamdale		63.5	39.5	PTH 6 – Gypsumville, Ashern	Eastern terminus; road continues as Batten Road (Road 188N)
1.000 mi = 1.609 km; 1.000 km = 0.621 mi
