= Waterhen =

Waterhen may refer to:

== Birds ==
- Common moorhen or common waterhen, a bird species in the rail family
- Amaurornis rails, a genus of birds in the rail family
- Various other birds of the family Rallidae (rails) may be informally called waterhens

== Places ==
- Waterhen 45, Indian reserve in Manitoba, Canada

== Other ==
- HMAS Waterhen, one ship and one shore establishment in the Royal Australian Navy

== See also ==
- Waterhen River (disambiguation)
- Waterhen Lake (disambiguation)
