= Waterhen, Manitoba =

Waterhen
- Northern community (designated place)
- Location of Waterhen in Manitoba
- Coordinates: 51.830°N 99.540°W
- Country: Canada
- Province: Manitoba

Area
  - Land: 154.10 km^{2} (59.50 sq mi)

Population (2021)
  - Total: 195
- Time zone: UTC-6 (CST)
  - Summer (DST): UTC-5 (CDT)

Waterhen is a northern community in the Canadian province of Manitoba. It is recognized as a designated place by Statistics Canada.

== Geography ==
Waterhen is on the Waterhen River at the intersection of Provincial Road 276 and Provincial Road 328. It covers a land area spanning from the northern shore of Lake Manitoba to the southern shore of Waterhen Lake.

== Demographics ==
As a designated place in the 2021 Census of Population conducted by Statistics Canada, Waterhen had a population of 195 living in 75 of its 104 total private dwellings, a change of 28.3% from its 2016 population of 152. With a land area of 154.1 km^{2} (59.5 sq mi), it had a population density of 1.3/km^{2} (3.3/sq mi) in 2021.

== Government ==
Waterhen has a community council comprising a mayor and four councillors.

== See also ==
- List of communities in Manitoba
- List of designated places in Manitoba
