= Waterhen Lake =

Waterhen Lake may refer to:

== Lakes ==
- Waterhen Lake (Manitoba)
- Waterhen Lake (Saskatchewan)

== Places ==
- South Waterhen Lake, Saskatchewan
- Waterhen Lake First Nation in Saskatchewan, Canada

== See also ==
- Waterhen (disambiguation)
- Waterhen River (disambiguation)
