= Waterhen River =

Waterhen River may refer to the following rivers in Canada:

- Waterhen River (Manitoba), a tributary of Lake Manitoba
- Waterhen River (Saskatchewan), a tributary of the Beaver River

== See also ==
- Waterhen (disambiguation)
- Waterhen Lake (disambiguation)
