= Hydroelectric Development in Easterville, Chemawawin =

Hydroelectric development in Easterville, Chemawawin began in 1962. By the early 1960s a new era began to emerge in Northern Manitoba with the development of hydroelectric projects. In 1962 the government of Manitoba contacted the Chemawawin Cree Nation asking them to surrender their lands so that the Grand Rapids Dam could be constructed. Subsequent flooding of the land that belonged to the Chemawawin people meant relocating them to Easterville, Manitoba. The Grand Rapids Forebay Administration Committee, or Forebay Committee for short, sent what is known as the "Letter of intent" or "Forebay Agreement" to the Chemawawin community stipulating a number of promises to them should they decide to relocate. Ultimately the Chemawawin people relocated to Easterville and continue to live there today. The agreements made between the government of Manitoba and the Chemawawin Indian Band are highly disputed in terms of whether the agreements were fulfilled.

== History ==
=== Chemawawin Indian Band and government relations ===
The signing of treaties by Northern Indians, in what is known today as Manitoba, began in 1875 when land was signed over to the Queen of Canada. The Chemawawin Indian Band signed Treaty 5 in 1876, significantly reducing their lands to a small reserve portion. Although the Grand Rapids Dam did not come into fruition until over eight decades later, the memory of the loss of land stuck in the minds of the Chemawawin people and played a large role in their hesitation towards the project.

=== The Chemawawin Community ===
In 1960 the Chemawawin community was small, at about 350 people. Chemawawin was located at the meeting point of the Saskatchewan River and Cedar Lake. The town was relatively isolated, so community members would travel by boat to either The Pas or Grand Rapids for trading. The community members made their living primarily through fishing and trapping. The community was resource-rich, although to some officials of the government of Manitoba it may have seemed that the community was actually quite poor, ultimately justifying the proposal by the government for the relocation of the community to Easterville.

=== The Grand Rapids Dam ===
In 1957 the planning of the Grand Rapids Dam was already underway, although the Chemawawin people did not learn of the project until 1960. The Grand Rapids Forebay Administration Committee, or the Forebay Committee for short, was made up of a number of civil servants working for the government of Manitoba. The Forebay Committee was put in charge of negotiating the terms of the relinquishing of their land and relocation of the Chemawawin people. The details of the offer made by the government of Manitoba were outlined in the "Letter of Intent", or "Forebay Agreement", which was sent to the chief in April 1962.

=== Letter of Intent or Forebay Agreement ===
"We feel that this letter is similar to a Treaty. We cannot accept what we do not think is right, as it is not we who will suffer for our mistake, but our children and our children’s children." – The People of Chemawawin’s initial response to the Forebay Agreement

The Letter of Intent (Forebay agreement) sent to the people of Chemawawin in April 1962 was met with a large degree of concern by the community. Similarities to Treaty 5 made the people of Chemawawin wary of accepting the terms without careful consideration and further negotiation. The government of Manitoba was fully committed to the project, and the Chemawawin people were informed that the building of the dam would go ahead regardless of their wishes to renegotiate terms. The government of Manitoba felt that the terms stipulated in the Forebay Agreement were equitable and stated "it could represent the interests of these people adequately" . The people of Chemawawin never asked for the representation of lawyers and were never offered representation; ultimately, the people accepted the terms of the Forebay Agreement.

Under the terms set out in the Forebay Agreement, a benefits package was offered to the people of Chemawawin. These benefits included the building of a new, fully modern town, with electricity, running water, bus service, a new school and cars, and the choosing of the location of this new town. Cash compensation was also offered in the benefits package. Although there is written documentation of the benefits offered to the people of Chemawawin, there is dispute over other agreements that may have been made orally to the people of Chemawawin in order to ensure that they would relocate.

== Easterville ==
=== Discrepancies between Forebay Agreement and reality ===
The community of Easterville was created on the south shore of Cedar Lake, approximately 40 kilometres (25 mi) west of Grand Rapids. With the creation of this site, one of the terms of the Forebay Agreement came under dispute. The government of Manitoba claimed that the people of Chemawawin democratically chose Easterville as the site of the new town; however, the people of Chemawawin claimed that they were never given a choice and that the Easterville site was the only one which was able to fulfill the terms stipulated in the agreement.

The other terms of the Forebay Agreement, mainly the physical infrastructure, seemed to be upheld by the Manitoba government. Easterville, by the Manitoba government standards, was a new modern town. New houses were built along gravel streets with official street names and a new school, recreation center, council office, co-op store and nursing station were all built at the center of town. Apart from the physical amenities of the town there were a number of problems presented to the Chemawawin people.

=== Social and physical problems in Easterville ===
The Easterville location proved to be a poor substitute for the previous site at Chemawawin. In Chemawawin the ground cover and soil was rich, but in Easterville there was little of either, as most of the ground was covered in gravel and rocks.

The Easterville site also proved to have some health hazards and environmental issues. A thick layer of limestone covered the majority of Easterville and prevented the building of pit toilets. Eventually sanitation became a large problem in the area, as the town was reliant on well water, which became contaminated with human waste. The people of Chemawawin attempted to recreate the fishing industry they previously had, but there were many problems. In 1971 mercury contamination caused the government to shut down the fishing industry. It was suspected that the mercury contamination was caused by the dam. The trapping industry was also highly affected due to the rising water on the shores. The muskrat and beaver populations dwindled significantly, and eventually the trapping industry mostly disappeared.

With the devastation to the trapping and fishing industries in Easterville social assistance payments increased significantly amongst the community members. It was said that "the spirit of the people of Chemawawin seemed to break once they were in Easterville", as social problems ran rampant throughout the community. Eventually the government of Manitoba created road access to The Pas and Grand Rapids but, while this was beneficial in some ways as people were able to gain access to larger commercial centers, it was also a great detriment to the people. Access to alcohol became much easier when the roads were developed, and alcohol abuse became a significant problem in Easterville.

== Current situation ==
On November 14, 1990, another agreement was contracted between the government of Manitoba and the inhabitants of Easterville. The agreement recognized some of the "adverse effects" that the Easterville resettlement had on the Chemawawin people and sought to pursue further compensation for the community. The agreement was not able to restore the people of Easterville to their former status in Chemawawin, but was a step towards a better future.

Like many other communities in Northern Manitoba affected by dam development, the situation in Easterville has not changed significantly and still requires a great detail of assistance in order for the people of Chemawawin to regain their spirit and reclaim the identity they had before the creation of the Grand Rapids Dam.

== Sources ==
- Hoffman, Steven M., "Engineering Poverty: Colonialism and Hydroelectric Development in Northern Manitoba." <http://energymanitoba.org/presentations/%5B‍%5D Angus_Dysart_supporting.doc.>
- Waldram, James B., "Native People and Hydroelectric Development in Northern Manitoba, 1957–1987: The Promise and the Reality", Manitoba History Spring 15 (1988): 1–9.
- Manitoba Hydro: Chemawawin/Easterville Settlement Agreement. 30 February 2009 <https://web.archive.org/web/20080403040406/http://www.hydro.mb.ca/community/agreements/chemawawin.html>
