= Easterville, Manitoba =

Easterville
- Unincorporated community
- Community boundaries

- Location in Manitoba
- Coordinates: 53°06′27″N 99°48′46″W
- Country: Canada
- Province: Manitoba
- Established: 1962; 64 years ago

Government
  - Type: Mayor–council
  - Chief: Clarence Easter
  - Councillors: Quentin Mink; Auggie Ledoux; Sheldon Bourassa; Conway Munroe; Franklin Turner

Area
  - Land: 3.31 km^{2} (1.28 sq mi)

Population (2016)
  - Total: 44
  - Density: 13.3/km^{2} (34/sq mi)
  - Summer (DST): UTC-5

Easterville is an unincorporated community, designated as a northern community, in the Canadian province of Manitoba.

It is situated 200 kilometres southeast of The Pas and 100 kilometres (40 km by air) west of Grand Rapids, on the south shore of Cedar Lake. Its elevation above sea level is 265 metres (869 ft). The Chemawawin Cree Nation community is adjacent to the community on Cedar Lake.

The current community of Easterville was established in 1962, when nearby native populations were being displaced by the building of the Grand Rapids Dam, which flooded their prior ~80-year-old community of Chemawawin.

== History ==
The community of Easterville as it exists today was established in 1962, when it, along with nearby Indigenous populations, were relocated to the south shore of Cedar Lake. The relocation happened as result of displacement by Manitoba Hydro, who flooded the original location within Chemawawin on the lake as a part of a hydroelectric development project for the construction of the Grand Rapids Dam. Roughly 200,000 hectares were flooded in total. The new area lacked arable land, unlike the old one, being composed mostly of rock. The terrain also resulted in buildings having to be built on cement foundations without basements.

== Demographics ==
In the 2021 Census of Population conducted by Statistics Canada, Easterville had a population of 20 living in 9 of its 14 total private dwellings, a change of −54.5% from its 2016 population of 44. With a land area of 3.12 km^{2} (1.20 sq mi), it had a population density of 6.4/km^{2} (16.6/sq mi) in 2021. Easterville is a part of Census Division No. 21, Manitoba.

== Economy ==
The main sources of economic base, or natural resources of Easterville, are fishing and trapping. The community offers recreational facilities such as the Skating Rink and community centre, public services including a fire hall and school, and local businesses like Easterville Fisherman's Association, a coffee shop, Griffin's Lucky Dollar Foods, and the U&S Department Store.

== Notable people ==
- Shelly Chartier, known for catfishing NBA player Chris Andersen

== Infrastructure ==
Easterville is located at the northern terminus of Manitoba Provincial Road 327. It is approximately 20 km north of Provincial Highway 60, the major roadway in the area which connects Highway 6 (to Thompson) and Highway 10 (to Flin Flon). The community is also serviced by Easterville Airport, located just to the east of the town.

== Media ==
- 93.5 (VF2337) (NCI)
- 95.5 CBWE-FM (CBC Radio One)
