= Fork River (New Zealand) =

River in New Zealand

- Route of the Fork River
- Mouth of the Fork River Fork River (New Zealand) (South Island) Fork River (New Zealand) (New Zealand)

Location
- Country: New Zealand
- Region: West Coast Region
- District: Westland

Physical characteristics
- Source
  - coordinates: 44.168056°S 168.2775°E
  - elevation: 355 metres (1,165 ft)
- Mouth
  - location: Tasman Sea
  - coordinates: 44°09′15″S 168°15′07″E
  - elevation: 0 metres (0 ft)
- Length: 2.5 kilometres (1.6 mi)

Basin features
- Progression: Fork River → Tasman Sea

The Fork River is a short river in the far south of the West Coast Region in New Zealand. As the name suggests, the river has two branches, with the longer South branch draining a plateau. The larger Spoon River lies a couple of kilometres to the north.
