= Shelly Chartier =

Canadian con artist (born 1983/1984)

- Born: 1983 or 1984 (age 41–42) near Easterville, Manitoba, Canada
- Other name: Ellie Marku
- Known for: Catfishing NBA player Chris Andersen
- Spouse: Rob Marku (m. 2014)

Shelly Lynne Chartier (born 1983/1984) is a Canadian woman who became infamous for her online involvement in a catfishing scandal involving NBA basketball player Chris Andersen and a teenage aspiring model, Paris Dunn, among others.

== Early life ==
Shelly Chartier led an isolated life as a self-proclaimed "hermit" for years, caring for her sick mother Delia inside their small home in the tiny town of Easterville, Manitoba. As a result of her mother's condition, she was mainly raised by her aunt, Cathy George, until her death in 2011. Chartier obtained only a sixth-grade education, with her mother pulling her out of school following constant bullying, including other students stealing her shoes. The few friends she had around this time later drifted away from her. Chartier had had little to no contact with the outside world following this, saying "I went through a period where I didn’t leave my house for 11 years". Chartier utilized the internet installed in her community in 2011 to facilitate connection and communication but had little real-world experience.

== Chris Andersen catfishing ==
When Chartier was 27 in 2012, Paris Dunn, 17, an aspiring actress, commented on a public status posted by NBA player Chris Andersen, 33, leaving her cell phone number. Seeing this, Chartier messaged Dunn as the NBA player and engaged in an online relationship. Chartier proceeded to set up fake social media accounts for Andersen and Dunn, as well as reach out to the real Chris Andersen from the 'Dunn' account.

"Tom Taylor" (another fake account), a fictional friend of Andersen's, was used to facilitate a meeting between the real Andersen and Dunn, in Denver. It is unclear if Chartier was behind this account as she has stated multiple times she was not. During the in-person meeting the 33-year-old NBA player engaged in sexual contact with then-17-year-old Dunn. The online relationship continued after the meeting but fizzled out. Subsequently, Dunn continued to message the 'Andersen' account and Chartier claims that in an attempt to stop the 'annoyance' the Tom Taylor account was utilized in a blackmail scheme that threatened to release the explicit images Dunn sent, at which point the police were involved. Chartier disclosed in the episode of Catfish: The TV Show based around the case that the "Tom Taylor" profile was never her and was the creation of another participant who the police were aware of.

The nude photographs of the teenager were considered child pornography, necessitating an investigation into Andersen. Andersen engaged in an online and in-person relationship with a 17-year-old, as she had given him the impression that she was a legal adult. Although the relationship was initiated through the profile created by Chartier, Andersen and Dunn did have an in-person meeting where the 33-year-old had a sexual encounter with the teenager—who had lied about her age—in an incident Dunn labels as a "kiss" in the Catfish: The TV Show episode where she is continually sympathetic to Andersen. Andersen was not charged with any crimes.

=== Arrest and imprisonment ===
Chartier was arrested on 15 January 2013. Chartier eventually pleaded guilty on 20 August 2015 to various charges of impersonation, extortion, uttering threats, and fraud under CA$5,000, stating that she was pregnant and that she was told if she pleaded guilty she would get house arrest. A Gladue report was created, but it was barebones and did not provide the court with much information about her prior life circumstances. Chartier was sentenced to 18 months in prison on 14 October, the maximum penalty requested by the Crown, and served a year of the sentence, including 50 days in solitary confinement, at the Manitoba Women's Correctional Centre in Headingley. She was denied parole three times during her incarceration. She was released on 22 October 2016. Following the arrest, she would come to be known as the "Ghost of Easterville", occasionally still being harassed when seen in public there, and has repeatedly expressed a desire to be allowed to move on with her life after serving her time. Chartier has stated she is remorseful for the incident but has not changed her story involving another participant. The incident was called "the biggest catfish [case]... ever solved". Following her release in Canada, it was reported that she still had an active warrant for her arrest out of Colorado, and if convicted of the charges there she could face multiple decades in prison.

=== Derivative works ===
The case inspired the Law and Order: Special Victims Unit episode "Intent". Further, a 2017 episode of Catfish: The TV Show included both Dunn and Chartier. Dunn wrote into the show after Chartier served her sentence.

Indictment: The Crimes of Shelly Chartier, a 2017 CBC documentary by Shane Belcourt and Lisa Jackson which aired as an episode of CBC Docs POV, has refocused the conversation around the case to center the isolated indigenous woman whom the media portrayed as the villain. In the documentary, psychologists stated they believed money was not the main goal, and that Shelly may have acted in the way she did "to have other people in her place acting as avatars so she could experience what the others were experiencing" while not having to deal with the fear of leaving the safety of her home for the outside world.

== Personal life ==
In 2014, Chartier married Rob Marku from Yonkers, New York on Christmas Day. A documentary of her life was produced by the CBC in 2017 and she was the subject of a sixth-season episode of Catfish: The TV Show.

Chartier does not drink alcohol or smoke, saying she cannot after seeing how her grandfather became irritable and mean when drunk often in her youth.

Until 2017, Chartier was unemployed, and as a result could not sponsor her husband for a visa to stay in Canada with her permanently. She eventually got a part-time position as a janitor in her Reserve's band office, and is now considered employed full-time as her mother's caregiver.

== See also ==
- Catfishing
