= M. A. Yewdale =

Canadian artist (1908–2000)

- Born: Muriel Agnes Fraser; 9 March 1908; Grand Rapids, Manitoba, Canada
- Died: 6 January 2000 (aged 91); Burnaby, British Columbia, Canada
- Education: The Art Institute of Vancouver, University of British Columbia
- Known for: Painter
- Movement: Modernism, Post-Impressionism, Expressionism

Muriel Agnes Yewdale (née Fraser) (1908–2000) was a 20th-century Canadian artist.

Born in Grand Rapids, Manitoba, in 1908, Yewdale grew up in northern Manitoba before attending a private school in Prince Albert, Saskatchewan. In 1929, she married Harry Yewdale. In 1930, they moved to Vancouver, British Columbia, and fifteen years later relocated to Burnaby. She attended the Vancouver School of Art between 1957 and 1961. One of her teachers was Jack Shadbolt, and she remained friends with him and his wife, Doris Shadbolt. She graduated from the University of British Columbia (1963–1965) with a Bachelor of Fine Arts degree. Yewdale didn't start painting until she was 48 years old. She suffered tragedy in her life, as her son died in 1972, her husband in 1974, and her daughter in 1989.

Yewdale's early work was sometimes abstract. Her home was surrounded by forest in the 1950s and 1960s, and her paintings often featured trees and aspects of a nearby creek or bog. The forest was eventually cut down for development, and so she painted its destruction as well. Earlier works were concerned with accurate representation, while later paintings recorded events, often in series. Yewdale's painting technique utilized brushstrokes similar to those of the Impressionists, with her colours unmixed on the palette. She preferred to paint en plein air, giving herself three hours to complete each large canvas. In addition to landscapes and abstracts, she also produced still-lifes. Furthermore, besides oil paintings, her output encompassed drawings, watercolours, ink, pastels, mosaics, and sculptures.

Her work was rarely shown during her active painting career, which lasted from the late 1950s to around the mid-1970s. Infrequent displays included the British Columbia Artists' annual exhibitions at the Vancouver Art Gallery in 1961 and 1966. Other venues were the local University Women's Club, and most notably, at the Ceperly Art Gallery in Burnaby in 1999, shortly before her death. Yewdale's paintings passed to her grandson, Jase Maxwell, who exhibited some of her artwork in 2006 at North Vancouver.

An exhibition catalogue of her work, Hidden Forest: The Art of M. A. Yewdale was published by the Burnaby Art Gallery in 1999.
