= O-Chi-Chak-Ko-Sipi First Nation =

Coordinates: 51.509°N 99.229°W

The O-Chi-Chak-Ko-Sipi First Nation (spelt as Ojijaako-ziibiing in standardized double-vowel Ojibwe Orthography) is a First Nations community in Manitoba.

Its reserve is Crane River 51. Consisting of over 3500 hectares of land on the shore of Lake Manitoba, it is approximately 225 kilometres northwest of Winnipeg and adjacent to the settlement of Crane River.
