= Waterhen 45 =

- First Nations reserve
- Location within Manitoba
- Coordinates: 51.954°N 99.596°W
- Country: Canada
- Province: Manitoba

Area
  - Land: 19.54 km^{2} (7.54 sq mi)

Population (2021)
  - Total: 476

Waterhen 45 is a First Nations reserve belonging to the Skownan First Nation in the Canadian province of Manitoba.

== Geography ==
Waterhen 45 is on the south shore of Waterhen Lake at the northern terminus of Provincial Road 276. The Waterhen River flows into Waterhen Lake near the southern boundary of Waterhen 45.

== Demographics ==
In the 2021 Census of Population conducted by Statistics Canada, Waterhen 45 had a population of 476 living in 172 of its 175 total private dwellings, a change of 27.6% from its 2016 population of 373. With a land area of 19.54 km^{2} (7.54 sq mi), it had a population density of 24.4/km^{2} (63.1/sq mi) in 2021.

== See also ==
- List of Indian reserves in Manitoba
