= Rorketon =

Settlement in Manitoba, Canada

Coordinates: 51°23′22″N 99°35′19″W

Rorketon is a small unincorporated community in the Rural Municipality of Lakeshore, Manitoba, Canada The community is located between Lake Dauphin and Lake Manitoba. The main industry in this area is cattle ranching. According to the 2021 census, the population of the Rural Municipality of Lakeshore, of which it is part, was 1,186.

Rorketon is situated on Provincial Road 364 approximately 40 km (25 mi) north of Sainte Rose du Lac, Manitoba. It is also situated about 20 km (12 mi) from Manipogo Provincial Park.
