= Spoon River (New Zealand) =

- Route of the Spoon River
- Mouth of the Spoon River Spoon River (New Zealand) (South Island) Spoon River (New Zealand) (New Zealand)

Location
- Country: New Zealand
- Region: West Coast Region
- District: Westland

Physical characteristics
- Source
  - coordinates: 44.1690°S 168.3832°E
- Mouth
  - location: Tasman Sea
  - coordinates: 44°08′50″S 168°15′20″E
  - elevation: 0 metres (0 ft)

Basin features
- Progression: Spoon River → Tasman Sea

Spoon River is a river in Westland, New Zealand. There is a hut, Spoon / Morgans Hut, on the true right of the river.
