= Mossey River =

River in Manitoba, Canada

Mossey River Mossy River
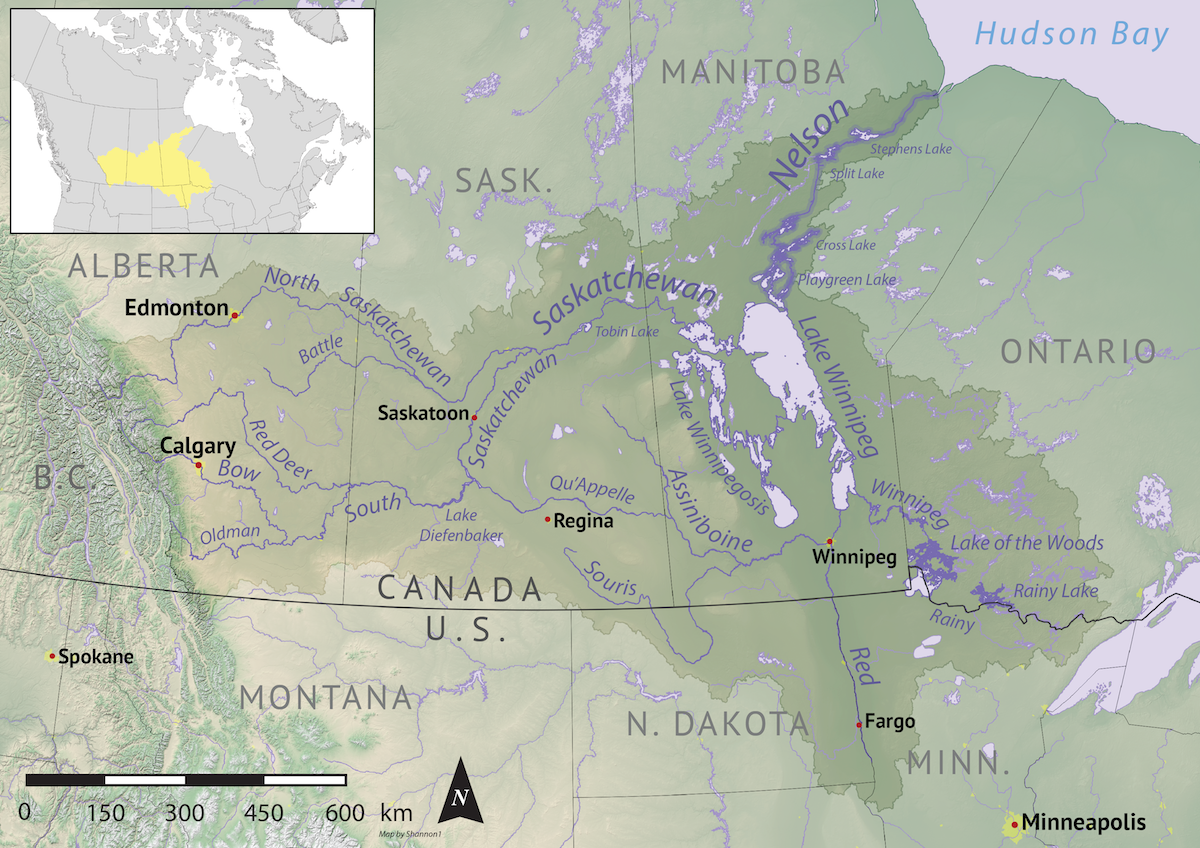
- Map of the Nelson River drainage basin

- Location of river's mouth in Manitoba Mossey River (Canada)

Location
- Country: Canada
- Province: Manitoba

Physical characteristics
- Source: Dauphin Lake
  - location: RM of Mossey River
  - coordinates: 51.4381°N 99.9519°W
  - elevation: 260.4 m (854 ft)
- Mouth: Lake Winnipegosis
  - location: RM of Mossey River
  - coordinates: 51.6528°N 99.9172°W
  - elevation: 254 m (833 ft)
- Length: 35 km (22 mi)

Basin features
- River system: Nelson River
- Tributaries
  - left: Fishing River; Fork River

Mossey River, also spelt Mossy River, is a river in the Canadian province of Manitoba. The river begins at the Mossy River Dam at the north end of Dauphin Lake and flows north into the south end of Lake Winnipegosis at the community of Winnipegosis.

Prior to 1900, Mossey River was spelt "Mossy". It is also the namesake of the Rural Municipality of Mossey River.

== Description ==
In 1964, the Mossy River Dam was constructed at Terin's Landing at the outlet of Dauphin Lake to help regulate water levels. The dam, which is operated by the province of Manitoba, is a ten bay concrete stoplog structure with a fish ladder. From the dam, Mossey River flows in a northward direction towards Highway 20, crosses PR 269, and meets Fork River — a tributary of Mossey River that rises up from the west in the Duck Mountains of the Manitoba Escarpment. Near the mouth of Fork River is the community of Fork River. From Fork River, Mossey River parallels Highway 20 (which is part of the Western Canadian Northern Woods and Water Route) until Winnipegosis at which point Highway 20 travels north then west while the river runs along the east side of the community before emptying into Lake Winnipegosis.

Prior to arriving at Winnipegosis, Mossey River is crossed by PR 364 and an historic steel pony truss bridge along Bridge St coming south out of Winnipegosis. Farther upstream, another historic steel pony truss bridge along Road 170 North crosses the river near the Fishing River tributary. It was built in 1910 while the Bridge St one was built in 1929.

=== Tributaries ===
- Fishing River
- Fork River
  - Shanty Creek
    - Ethelbert Creek

== Fish species ==
Fish commonly found in Mossey River include walleye, northern pike, yellow perch, sucker, common carp, and freshwater drum.

== See also ==
- List of rivers of Manitoba
- Hudson Bay drainage basin
