= Skownan First Nation =

- Band No. 281
- People: Saulteaux
- Treaty: Treaty 2
- Headquarters: Skownan, Manitoba

Land
- Main reserve: Waterhen 45

Population (2015)
- On reserve: 750
- Total population: 1,464

Government
- Chief: Cameron Cacheway

Tribal Council
- West Region Tribal Council

Website
- skofn.com

Skownan First Nation (Ojibwe: Ishkwaawinaaning) is a Saulteaux (Ojibwe) First Nations band government whose reserve community, Waterhen 45, is located 288 km north of Winnipeg, Manitoba, Canada, on the south shore of Waterhen Lake, between Lake Winnipeg and Lake Winnipegosis. As of May, 2015, the First Nation had 1,464 registered members, of which 750 lived on-reserve.

The Skownan First Nation is a member of the West Region Tribal Council.

Skownan First Nation also owns and operates a local radio station, known as 98.7 SKO FM. The radio station services the community.

== History ==
Originally, the First Nation was known as the Waterhen River Band of Saulteaux and later simply as Waterhen First Nation (not to be confused with the Waterhen Lake Band of Cree in Saskatchewan, known today as the Waterhen Lake First Nation). The Skownan First Nation is a signatory to Treaty 2. Their name comes from Ne-biimiskonaan, meaning 'to turn around the point' or 'turning point' in the Anishinaabe language.

== Governance ==
The Skownan First Nation elect their council on a now four*-year term under the authority of the Act Electoral System. The current Chief is Cameron Catcheway; the Councillors are Ken Catcheway, Sterling Catcheway, Jimmy Chartrand and Charlotte Nepinak. The Chief and Councillors' terms began on November 3, 2016, and will expire on November 5, 2020.

The First Nation is a member of West Region Tribal Council, a regional tribal council.

=== List of Chiefs ===
Period	Chief	Notes
1871	Francois/Broken Fingers	signatory of Treaty 2
1872–1885	Katahkahwaynaas	
1885–1922	Baptiste O'kitchekeshowenin/Nepinak	
1922–1950	Hermus Nepinak	
1951–1955	Alex Catcheway	terms 1–2
1955–1959	Moise Catcheway	terms 1–2
1959–1961	Alex Catcheway	term 3
1961–1963	Joe Catcheway	
1963–1965	Carl Gabriel	
1965–1967	Alphonse Catcheway	
1967–1969	Moise Catcheway	term 3
1969–1971	Donald Catcheway	
1971–1979	Moise Catcheway	terms 4–7
1979–1983	Harvey Nepinak	terms 1–2
1983–1987	Larry Catagas	
1987–1999	Harvey Nepinak	terms 3–8
1999–2003	Bernard Catcheway	terms 1–2
2003–2005	Robert Lavallee	
2005–2010	Harvey Nepinak	terms 9–11.5
2010–incumbent	Cameron Catcheway	

== Reserves ==
The Skownan First Nation has only one Indian reserve, the 1,856.7-hectare Waterhen Indian Reserve No. 45.
