= Cedar Lake (Manitoba) =

Lake in Manitoba, Canada

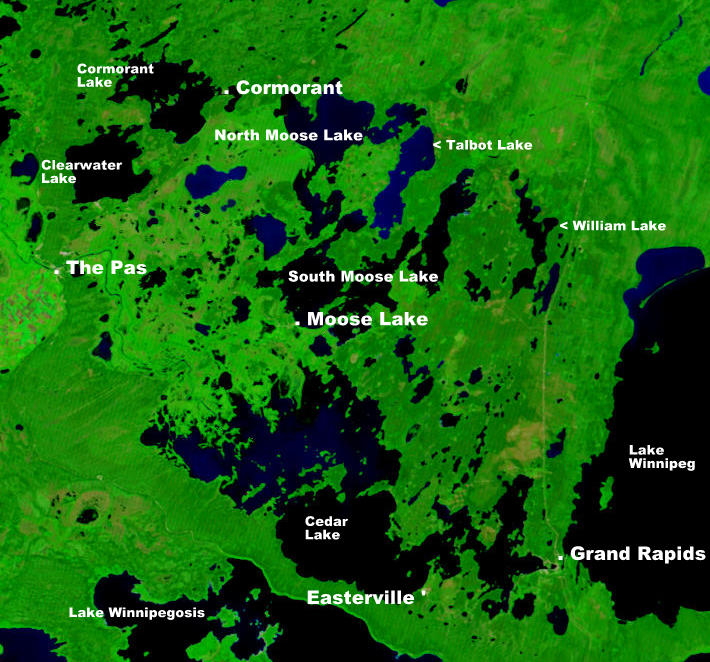
- NASA image showing Cedar Lake

- Location of the lake in Manitoba Cedar Lake (Canada)
- Location: Division No. 21, North-West Manitoba
- Coordinates: 53°19′45″N 100°10′08″W
- Primary inflows: Saskatchewan River
- Primary outflows: Saskatchewan River
- Basin countries: Canada
- Max. length: 62.5 m (205 ft)
- Surface area: 1,353 km^{2} (522 sq mi)
- Max. depth: 10 m (33 ft)
- Surface elevation: 253 m (830 ft)

Cedar Lake is a lake just north of Lake Winnipegosis in Manitoba, Canada. Cedar Lake's water level is controlled by the Grand Rapids Dam. The town of Grand Rapids and the First Nations town of Easterville are nearby.

The lake is known to have excellent examples of prehistoric amber fossil of cretaceous age. This amber is sometimes called "Cedarit", and it contains many organic inclusions. To date, these inclusions have not been thoroughly researched.

The lake's main source is the Saskatchewan River, which forms a delta on the northwest side of the lake. The flow of the Saskatchewan River to Lake Winnipeg on the eastern end of Cedar Lake is regulated by the Grand Rapids Dam built in 1962 by Manitoba Hydro.

Some 40 commercial fishing licenses are granted to operate on the lake, which produce between $600,000 and $1M in landed value, making it the 4th largest fishery in Manitoba.

== History ==
The Hudson's Bay Company (HBC) established a wintering post on the lake circa 1857, and it operated intermittently from 1862 to 1886, after which it became an outpost of the Moose Lake trading post. In 1893, the roles reversed and Cedar Lake became a full fur trade post with Moose Lake serving as its outpost. The post closed circa 1940.

In 1961, construction on the Grand Rapids hydroelectric generating station and dam began, completed in 1964. As a result, it raised the lake's water level by 3.65 metres (12.0 ft) and required the relocation of the Cree community of Chemawawin on the west side of the lake to the newly-built Easterville.

== See also ==
- Saskatchewan River Delta
- List of lakes of Manitoba
