= Rural Municipality of Lakeshore =

Rural municipality in Manitoba, Canada

Lakeshore
- Rural municipality
- Rural Municipality of Lakeshore
- Coordinates: 51.243962°N 99.656216°W
- Country: Canada
- Province: Manitoba
- Region: Parkland
- Census division: No. 17
- Incorporated (amalgamated): January 1, 2015

Government
  - Reeve: Carmen Hannibal
  - Deputy Reeve: Walter Tymchuk

Area
  - Land: 1,295.64 km^{2} (500.25 sq mi)

Population (2021)
  - Total: 1,186
  - Density: 0.9154/km^{2} (2.371/sq mi)
- Time zone: UTC-6 (CST)
  - Summer (DST): UTC-5 (CDT)
- Website: www.rmoflakeshore.ca

The Rural Municipality of Lakeshore is a rural municipality (RM) in the Parkland Region of Manitoba, Canada.

Lakeshore is named for the proximity of the shoreline of Dauphin Lake, which splits the municipality into north and south. The RM is anchored on its south end by the Rainbow Beach Provincial Park on Dauphin Lake, and on its north end by Manipogo Provincial Park on Lake Manitoba.

== History ==
The RM was incorporated on January 1, 2015 via the amalgamation of the RMs of Ochre River and Lawrence. It was formed as a requirement of The Municipal Amalgamations Act, which required that municipalities with a population less than 1,000 amalgamate with one or more neighbouring municipalities by 2015. The Government of Manitoba initiated these amalgamations in order for municipalities to meet the 1997 minimum population requirement of 1,000 to incorporate a municipality.

== Communities ==
Constituent communities of the Rural Municipality of Lakeshore include:

- Ochre River
- Rorketon
- East Bay
- Freedale
- Magnet
- Makinak
- Methley
- Million
- Moose Bay
- Toutes Aides
- Weiden

== Demographics ==
In the 2021 Census of Population conducted by Statistics Canada, Lakeshore had a population of 1,186 living in 531 of its 861 total private dwellings, a change of −13% from its 2016 population of 1,363. With a land area of 1,295.64 km^{2} (500.25 sq mi), it had a population density of 0.9/km^{2} (2.4/sq mi) in 2021.

== See also ==
- List of francophone communities in Manitoba
