= Meadow Portage, Manitoba =

Coordinates: 51.667°N 99.608°W

Meadow Portage
- Interactive map of Meadow Portage
- Country: Canada
- Province: Manitoba

Population
  - Total: 70
- Area code: (204)
- Website: http://www.meadowportage.ca/

Meadow Portage is a community in the Canadian province of Manitoba.

Meadow Portage is the name of a two kilometre fur-trade era portage across the isthmus between Lake Winnipegosis and Lake Manitoba. The portage avoids a longer river-journey option north (via Long Island Bay to the West Waterhen River and Waterhen Lake, then a sharp turn south to the Waterhen River), a savings of about 70 km to Lake Manitoba.

Meadow Portage was originally inhabited by the Cree, Assiniboines, and the Ojibway peoples. The Hudson Bay Company then set up a trading post near the shore of Lake Manitoba in order to facilitate the fur trade. The telephone area code for Meadow Portage is (204).

== Demographics ==
In the 2021 Census of Population conducted by Statistics Canada, Meadow Portage had a population of 72 living in 37 of its 147 total private dwellings, a change of 7.5% from its 2016 population of 67. With a land area of 115.61 km^{2} (44.64 sq mi), it had a population density of 0.6/km^{2} (1.6/sq mi) in 2021.
