= Manipogo Provincial Park =

Provincial park in Manitoba, Canada

- Location within Manitoba
- Interactive map of Manipogo Provincial Park
- Location: Parkland Region, Manitoba
- Nearest city: Dauphin, Manitoba
- Coordinates: 51°31′0″N 99°32′59″W
- Area: 61 ha (150 acres)
- Created: 1961

Manipogo Provincial Park is a provincial park on the shore of Lake Manitoba, approximately 50 km (31 mi), northeast of Dauphin, Manitoba. It is named after Manipogo, a lake monster reputed to live in the lake.

The 0.61 km^{2} (0.24 sq mi) area was declared a provincial park in 1961.

The park is located within the Waterhen ecodistrict of the Interlake Plain ecoregion, part of the Boreal Plains ecozone.

== See also ==
- List of protected areas of Manitoba
- List of provincial parks in Manitoba
