= Winnipegosis =

Community in Manitoba, Canada

- Unincorporated urban community
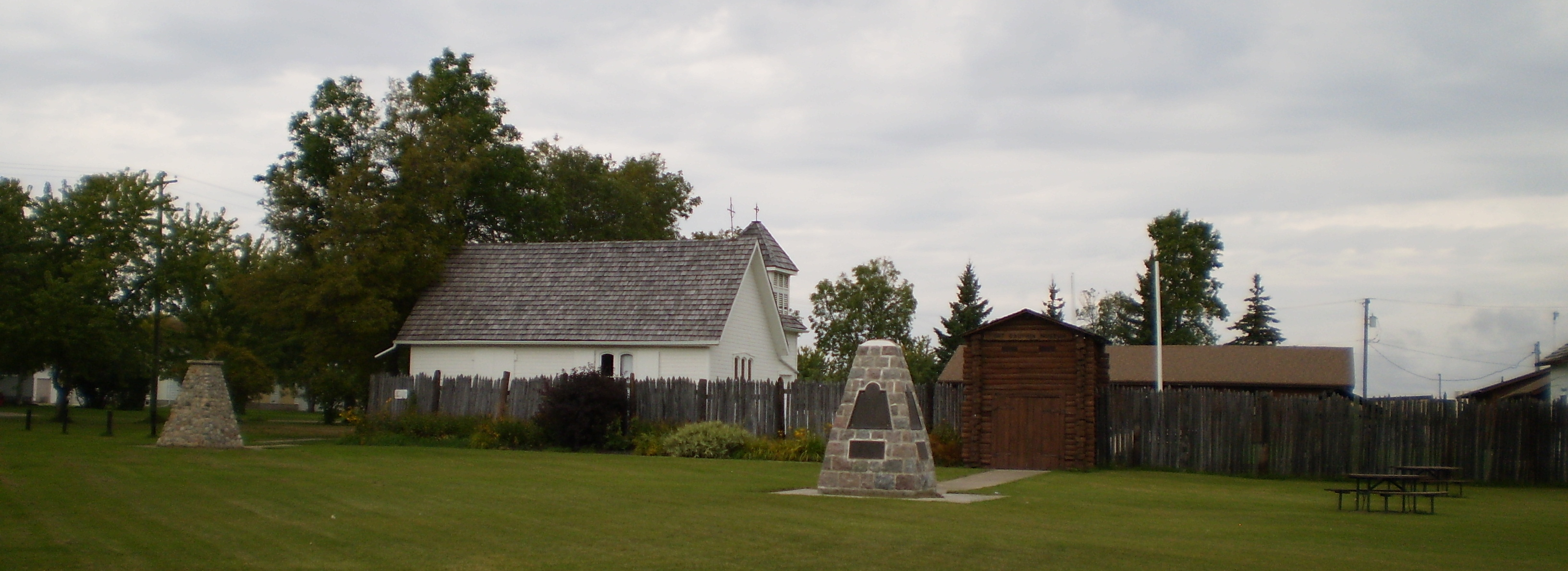
- Fort Dauphin
- Nickname: Little Muddy Water
- Location within Manitoba
- Coordinates: 51°38′55″N 99°55′33″W
- Country: Canada
- Province: Manitoba
- Region: Parkland Region
- Municipality: Mossey River
- Incorporated: March 10, 1915
- Amalgamated: January 1, 2015

Government
  - Reeve: Ron Kostyshyn
  - MLA (Swan River): Rick Wowchuk (PC)
  - MP (Dauphin—Swan River—Neepawa): Dan Mazier (CPC)

Population (2011 Census)
  - Total: 647
  - Density: 258.8/km^{2} (670/sq mi)
  - Change 2006-11: ▲3.0%
  - Summer (DST): UTC−05:00 (CDT)
- Postal code: R0L 2G0
- Area code: 204
- Demonym: Winnipegosiser

Winnipegosis is an unincorporated urban community in the Rural Municipality of Mossey River, Manitoba, Canada. It lies at the mouth of the Mossey River on Lake Winnipegosis in west-central Manitoba.

The community was once categorized as a village, but this status was relinquished on 1 January 2015 upon its amalgamation with the RM of Mossey River.

== History ==
The first Europeans to come to the Winnipegosis area were early explorers and fur traders, with the mouth of Lake Winnipegosis' Mossey River serving as a meeting place for many trappers and traders throughout the year to do business and purchase supplies. The first traders were men of the Hudson's Bay Company. Others, who arrived a bit later for trapping and fishing, were English, Scottish, French, and German.

In the late 1700s, the original Fort Dauphin was constructed by descendants of the French explorer LaVérendrye.

The railroad arrived in the area in 1897, whereafter Ukrainians and other Central Europeans came to the area.

In 1898, the community's post office name was changed to Winnipegosis, when it joined other buildings moved to the new townsite.

In 1900, Icelandic fishermen came by boat, bringing cattle, to settle at Red Deer Point on the west side of the lake, around 20 miles from present-day Winnipegosis.

On March 10, 1915, the Village of Winnipegosis was incorporated as a municipality, with Joseph P. Grenon as the first mayor. The Lieutenant Governor of Canada proclaimed the community as a village the following month.As the fur trade had ended by this time, the community found its main economic activities to be in timber and fishing.

Winnipegosis remained a village until January 1, 2015, when it was amalgamated with the Rural Municipality of Mossey River.

=== Etymology ===
The community takes its name from the lake on which it is situated: Lake Winnipegosis. The lake's name, which has evolved through different spellings, came from the Cree word win-nipi (meaning 'muddy/murky waters') and the suffix -osis (meaning 'little'), as diminutive of Winnipeg, which means 'muddy waters'.

Mossey River was spelled "Mossy" prior to 1900.

=== Commerce ===
Various forts of different companies, such as the Hudson's Bay Company (HBC), have stood on this site. The mouth of Mossey River was the site of the original Fort Dauphin fur trading post, constructed by the son of French explorer Pierre Gaultier de Varennes, sieur de La Vérendrye, in the late 18th century.

The peak of the community's economic boom occurred during the settler-era fur trade and 20th century timber and fishing industries.

Emil Hartman was the inaugural postmaster from 1896–1905. The Dauphin railway that arrived in late 1897 named the station after the lake. In 1898, the post office name changed from Mossy River to Winnipegosis, when it joined other buildings moved to the new townsite. That year, the community possessed 2 hotels, 2 boarding houses, 3 general stores, a butcher, a blacksmith, a 30-man sawmill, and 2 larger fish trading companies (North West Fish Co. and The Armstrong Trading Co, subsidiary of Booth Fisheries Co.).

In early 1906, Joseph Grenon Jr. began a mink ranch across the river, from where he sold the animals and furs to Moncton, New Brunswick.

In 1924, Peter McArthur (Standard Lumber Co.) opened the first sawmill that operated until the planer mill burned down. The Albion Hotel, closed 1908–1911, was renamed Hotel Winnipegosis. Fire destroyed the Lake View Hotel in 1914.

Telephone connections came in 1912; the 1915 directory listed five subscribers. A Bank of Ottawa branch, which opened in 1919, became a Bank of Nova Scotia after the merger that year. The first ice-cream parlour possessed the first radio in 1921.

In 1935, schoolteacher Paul Rudiak (c. 1906–1975) established the Rudiak Flour Mills, for which Jack Mason was the miller.

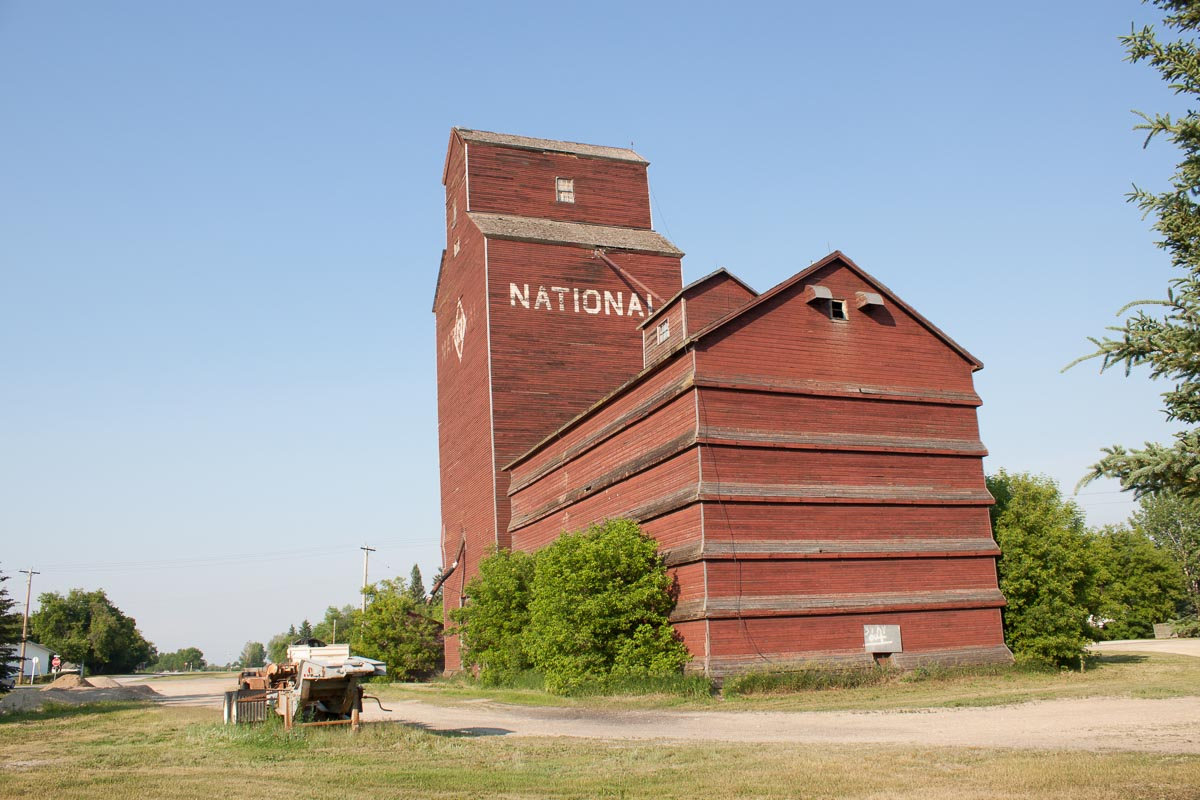
National Grain elevator, Winnipegosis, 2015

In 1950, a wooden grain elevator was built at Winnipegosis by National Grain. Around 1956, its initial 55,000-bushel capacity was increased to 85,000 bushels by the construction of a balloon annex on its southern side. Sold to Cargill Grain in 1975, the building was closed in April 1981, and demolished in March 2021.

The Winnipegosis Credit Union, formed in 1953, merged into the Dauphin Plains Credit Union in 1970, and further mergers followed.

=== Education, religion, and entertainment ===
The school district formed in 1899, and a 120-pupil-capacity school was erected the following year. W.J. Coleman was teacher to the 73 students. Staff increased to two in 1906, three in 1913, and four in 1914. The two-storey brick building, which opened that year, remained in use until 1960. When fire destroyed the former building in 1919, a church provided temporary accommodation, until a new two-classroom building opened in the early 1920s.

The open-air skating rink established in 1935 was replaced 20 years later. Hockey players and the curling club used several rinks, at various locations, from 1903 onward.

In 1955, a new four-classroom building opened for the collegiate (senior school). Secondary education came under the control of Duck Mountain School Division #34 in 1958, and the elementary followed in 1967. In 1960, the elementary school was rebuilt on 14 acres west of the village, and the collegiate was rebuilt on the original campus. Additional classroom space and gyms augmented both campuses in the 1970s.

==== Religion ====
The Dauphin Methodist district added Mossey River to its preaching circuit in 1896. C.T. Currelly, appointed missionary during summer 1899, ministered throughout Valley River, Fork River, and Mossey River. The Winnipegosis church building opened on August 25, 1901. In 1925, the congregation became part of the United Church. Closed in 2012, the property was sold. Anglican missionary Henry Herbert Scrase, based at Fork River, was known to have held church services and Sunday school at the Winnipegosis schoolhouse 1908–1912. A surplus schoolhouse, moved from Fork River in 1927, became the new church building. Closed in 1967, the property was sold in 1969. Over the years, the rectors of St. Paul's Dauphin, came to administer the sacraments.

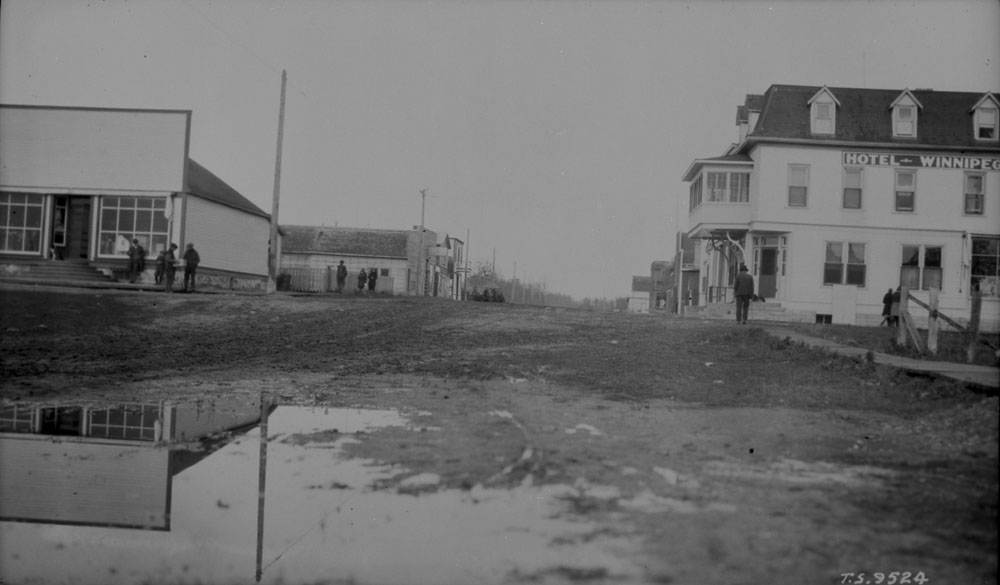
Street scene, Winnipegosis, 1924

Knox Presbyterian opened in 1901, but only a Sunday school outreach 1913–1925, was served by a series of student ministers, a lay minister 1957–1969, and then the ministers for St. James, Dauphin. With a Roman Catholic presence since 1905, the Corpus Christi Church that opened in 1939 replaced a smaller building. The Ukrainian Catholic Church, built in 1929, is a listed historic place.

The Nordheim Mennonite congregation in Winnipegosis began services in 1931, and formally organized in 1933. The initial building served 1934–1964, until replaced to a more central location. The transition from German to English services occurred in the 1960s. A separate Mennonite Brethren congregation existed 1939–1968.

The Jehovah's Witnesses, that functioned c.1946–1987, moved a building from Valley River in 1966. After meeting for years in homes, the Seventh Day Adventist building opened in 1957. Having met in various facilities the previous year, the Ukrainian Orthodox Church moved a building from Dry River in 1961. Soon too small for the congregation, a new building was erected in 1965.

The Rex Hall, opened in 1915, was the venue for concerts, dances, balls, and various events. Sidney Coffey screened movies at a rented hall, before building the Rex. A tea room, confectionary, and balcony were later added. The theatre, seating about 250, closed in 1967.

=== Healthcare and social services ===
Dr. A. Ernest Medd (1883–1946) established the first practice in 1909. On marrying Mary Agnes McArthur, they resided the rest of their lives on 2nd St. His patients covered a wide area, and his role as coroner stretched as far as Swan River. Their house has become a museum.

The Sisters of St. Benedict of Winnipeg administered the 20-bed Crerar Hospital 1936–1966 on the grounds of the Corpus Christi Church. The 22-bed Winnipegosis General Hospital opened in 1966, and the 20-bed Personal Care Home in 1980–1981. The Winnipegosis & District Health Centre oversees these facilities.

The Elks Lodge #108 has remained active at least since 1925, before the Manitoba Elks Association formally received its Charter in 1927. The Royal Purple Lodge #86 has operated since 1945. The Marv Elks Memorial Home for seniors opened in the mid-1960s.

The Knights of Columbus #6798 existed from 1975 for about 30 years.

The first ambulance, acquired in 1975, was garaged at the hospital from 1982.

=== Public services ===
Prior to the 1915 establishment of a police post, serious crime in the community was handled by outside constables. The Royal Canadian Mounted Police (RCMP) was contracted from 1969–1972 and 1982 onward.

The municipal cemetery was created in 1916. At a 1919 commemoration service, returned soldiers placed flowers on the graves of war dead. The next year, the site was staked into plots. The government dock was built in the mid-1920s.

A volunteer fire brigade formed in 1933, and a fire hall was built in 1950, which was replaced in 1980.

In 1937, electric power came and the first street lights were installed.

First Street (Main Street) was widened and paved in 1961. Water and sewerage pipes were installed in 1965. The village purchased the former train station building in 1977 for a museum, leasing the grounds from CN.

== Demographics ==
In the 2021 Census of Population conducted by Statistics Canada, Winnipegosis had a population of 945 living in 388 of its 481 total private dwellings, a change of 53.2% from its 2016 population of 617. With a land area of 2.54 km^{2} (0.98 sq mi), it had a population density of 372.0/km^{2} (963.6/sq mi) in 2021.

== Economy ==
Winnipegosis has an economy including restaurants, museums, gas stations, a hotel, a financial institution, grocery stores, hair dressers, a pharmacy, and a nine-hole golf course. The community also has a Royal Canadian Mounted Police detachment, a volunteer fire department, and ambulance service. Today, ranching, agriculture, fishing, tourism and seniors' services provides the community with its present and future economic prosperity.

=== Ecology ===
Big game, moose, elk, deer, various fur-bearing animals, game birds, ducks, geese, and every northern species of songbird are indigenous to the region.

The area is a popular place for hunting and fishing. American black bear hunting is a growing industry in the Winnipegosis area. With its proximity to Lake Winnipegosis and many small surrounding lakes, it is a haven for migratory game birds and attracts many ducks and geese. There is both commercial and recreational fishing, as there are walleye and an assortment of other Manitoba freshwater fish.

The first sturgeon in Lake Winnipegosis were brought by Captain Alex Vance from Grand Rapids in 1897. Sturgeon is strictly a Lake Winnipeg fish and do not thrive in the salty water of Winnipegosis.
