= Chemawawin Cree Nation =

First Nations community in Manitoba, Canada

The Chemawawin Cree Nation (Swampy Cree: ᒌᒧᐑᐏᐣ, romanized: cîmowîwin, lit. 'fishing with two canoes across from each other pulling a net') is a First Nations community located in the lower region of northern Manitoba, Canada, next to the community of Easterville.

The population of this First Nation is identified as Swampy Cree and also Rocky Cree (Asinīskāwiyiniwak). The main reserve, Chemawawin 2, is located on the south shore of Cedar Lake in Census Division No. 21, whereas the larger but less populous Chemawawin 3 (52°57′04″N 99°43′45″W) lies directly south on the northeast shores of Lake Winnipegosis in Census Division No. 19.
