= Rural Municipality of Mossey River =

Rural municipality in Manitoba, Canada

Mossey River
- Rural municipality
- Rural Municipality of Mossey River

- Location of Mossey River in Manitoba
- Coordinates: 51°45′18″N 99°57′59″W
- Country: Canada
- Province: Manitoba
- Region: Parkland
- Incorporated: May 1, 1906
- Amalgamated: January 1, 2015

Government
  - Reeve: Reynold Sahulka

Area
  - Land: 1,119.96 km^{2} (432.42 sq mi)

Population (2021)
  - Total: 1,450
  - Density: 1.29/km^{2} (3.35/sq mi)
- Time zone: UTC-6 (CST)
  - Summer (DST): UTC-5 (CDT)
- Website: mosseyrivermunicipality.com

The Rural Municipality of Mossey River is a rural municipality (RM) in the Parkland Region of Manitoba, Canada, located at the south end of Lake Winnipegosis.

It is named for the Mossey River, a river that flows through the municipality.

== History ==
The Rural Municipality of Mossey River was incorporated on May 1, 1906. On January 1, 2015, it amalgamated with the Village of Winnipegosis as dictated by The Municipal Amalgamations Act, which required that municipalities with a population less than 1,000 amalgamate with one or more neighbouring municipalities by 2015. The Government of Manitoba initiated these amalgamations in order for municipalities to meet the 1997 minimum population requirement of 1,000 to incorporate a municipality.

== Communities ==
- Fork River
- Oak Brae
- Volga
- Winnipegosis

== Demographics ==
In the 2021 Census of Population conducted by Statistics Canada, Mossey River had a population of 1,450 living in 612 of its 730 total private dwellings, a change of 26.6% from its 2016 population of 1,145. With a land area of 1,119.96 km^{2} (432.42 sq mi), it had a population density of 1.3/km^{2} (3.4/sq mi) in 2021.
