= Crane River, Manitoba =

Community in Manitoba, Canada

Coordinates: 51.532°N 99.281°W

Crane River is a community in the Canadian province of Manitoba. A designated place in Canadian census data, the community had a population of 128 in the Canada 2006 Census The Reservation consists of 3 Councillors and 1 Chief, the reserve has all the basic needs like a Water Treatment Plant, A school for the kids inside of the community, a band office for the band members, a radio station that is mainly used for radio bingo, Health Centre, Daycare and headstart programs for the younger kids that cannot attend elementary school. The primary language used is English, most of the youth do not know how to speak Ojibway, we may have an understanding but we do not know how to speak the language and understand what is being said. .

== Demographics ==
In the 2021 Census of Population conducted by Statistics Canada, Crane River had a population of 111 living in 36 of its 61 total private dwellings, a change of -27% from its 2016 population of 152. With a land area of 25.11 km^{2} (9.70 sq mi), it had a population density of 4.4/km^{2} (11.4/sq mi) in 2021.
