= Fork River, Manitoba =

Community in Manitoba, Canada

Fork River
- Unincorporated community
- Location within Manitoba
- Coordinates: 51°30′42″N 100°01′13″W
- Country: Canada
- Province: Manitoba
- Municipality: RM of Mossey River

Government (RM of Mossey River)
  - Reeve: Reynold Sahulka
- Time zone: UTC-6 (CST)
  - Summer (DST): UTC-5 (CDT)
- Postal code: R0L 0V0
- Area code: (204)-657-2

Fork River is an unincorporated community in the Rural Municipality of Mossey River, Manitoba, Canada. The community is situated on the banks of Fork River, which is a tributary of Mossey River. Access is from Highway 20.

Mainly surrounded by farmland, it is about 13 kilometres (8.1 mi) south of Winnipegosis, 25 minutes north of Dauphin. Fork River at one time had over 200 inhabitants, but that number has since dwindled.

== Amenities ==
The community had a number of stores and used to have regular stops from passing trains; however, as the tracks began to no longer be used, and as the population declined, the stores eventually dwindled away with the last one closing in 1996. As of the turn of the millennium, the tracks have been removed and commodities are transported solely by large trucks.

The community still has an operational granary. Its main route of transportation is Highway 20. Fork River also has a skating rink that has over 100 people that visit over a winter season. The hall is also used for many weddings and socials, and has a weekly Thursday night Bingo.
