= Dauphin Lake =

Lake in Manitoba, Canada

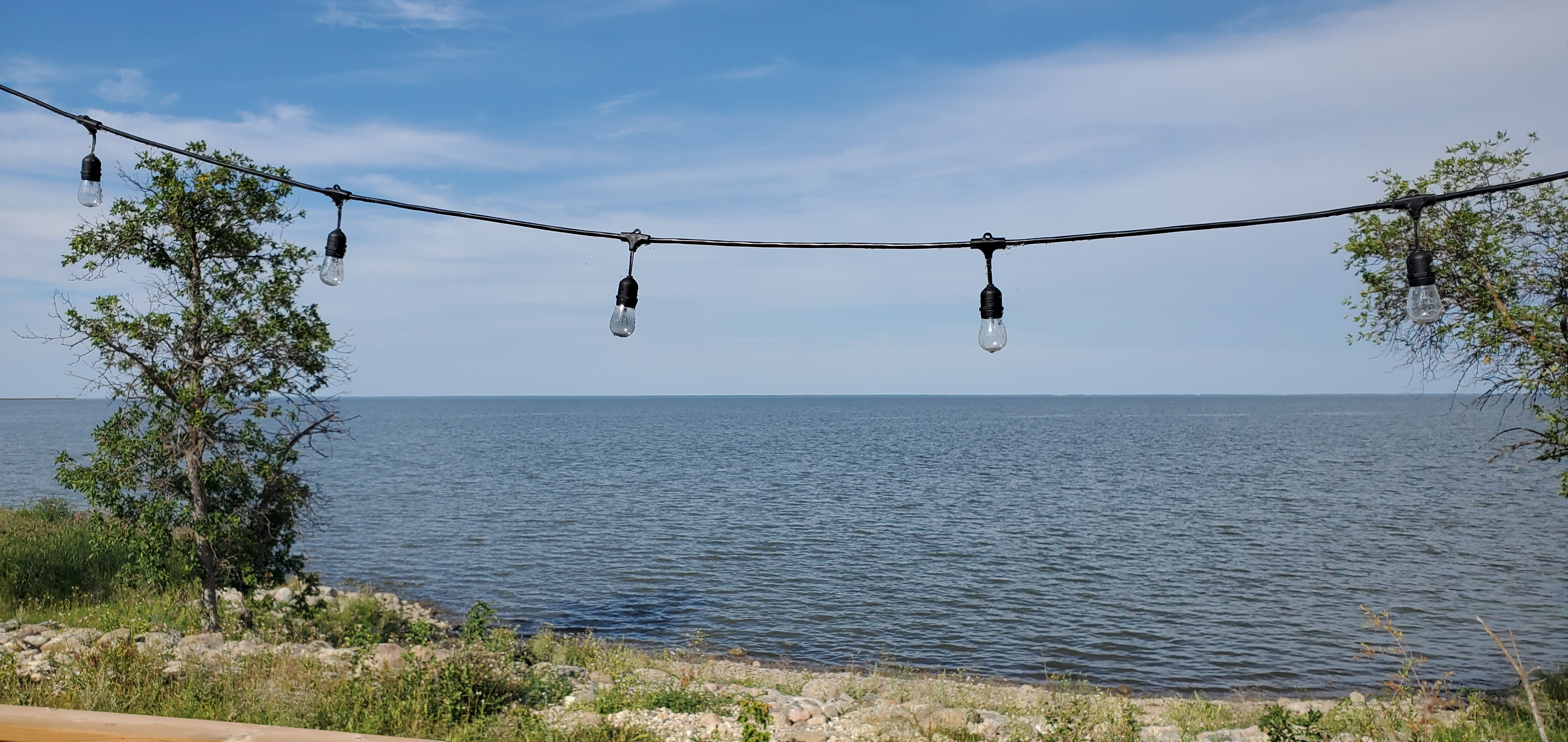
- Dauphin Lake

- Location of the lake in Manitoba Dauphin Lake (Canada)

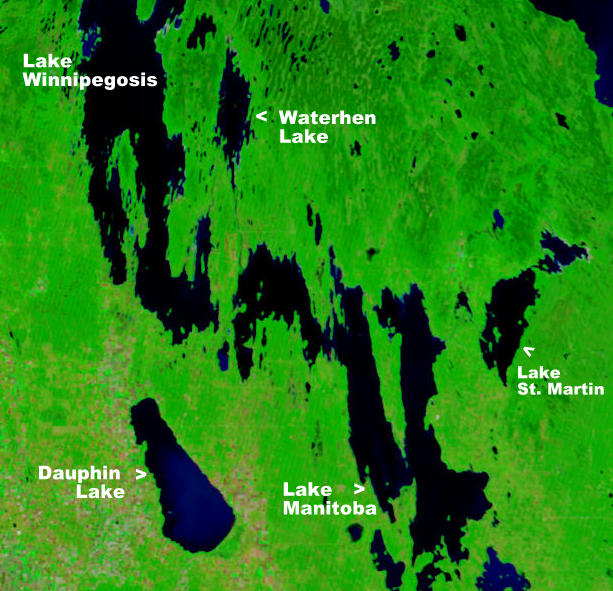
- Dauphin Lake is west of Lake Manitoba
- Location: Manitoba
- Coordinates: 51°15′N 99°45′W
- Etymology: Dauphin of France
- Primary outflows: Mossey River (to Lake Winnipegosis)
- Catchment area: 8,870 km^{2} (3,420 sq mi)
- Basin countries: Canada
- Surface area: 521 km^{2} (201 sq mi)
- Average depth: 2.4 m (7 ft 10 in)
- Max. depth: 3.4 m (11 ft)
- Water volume: 1.29 km^{3} (1,050,000 acre⋅ft)
- Residence time: 3.55 years
- Shore length^{1}: 190 km (120 mi)
- Surface elevation: 260.4 m (854 ft)
- ^{1} Shore length is not a well-defined measure.

Dauphin Lake is located in western Manitoba near the city of Dauphin. The lake covers an area of 201 square miles (520 km^{2}) and has a drainage basin of about 3,420 square miles (8,900 km^{2}). The Mossy River drains the lake into Lake Winnipegosis. The basin is drained by seven major streams and has a total relief of 1,900 feet (580 m).

The lake is located within the territory of three rural municipalities; in descending order of area they are the RM of Ochre River, the RM of Dauphin, and the RM of Mossey River.

Dauphin Lake was named after the Dauphin of France, heir to the French throne, by Francois de La Verendrye in 1739.

== Hydrography ==
Dauphin Lake is located west of Lake Manitoba and south of Lake Winnipegosis. It receives most of its waters from the west.

=== Mossy River Dam ===
Several efforts have been made to control lake levels in the last century. In 1964, the Mossy River Dam was constructed at Terin's Landing at the outlet of the lake. The ten bay concrete stoplog structure complete with a fish ladder is operated by the Province of Manitoba. The summer target since 1993 has been 854.8 feet (260.54 m). The dam can restrict the outflow when conditions are dry and levels low but the river limits the outflow when the lake is high.

Regulation of the lake is difficult. Conditions can change very quickly. For example, a four-day rain in June 1947 produced an estimated peak inflow of 60,000 cubic feet per second (1,700 m^{3}/s). At normal levels, the Mossy River can only take out about 500 cubic feet per second (14 m^{3}/s).

=== Tributaries ===
Tributaries of Dauphin Lake include the Turtle River, Kerosene Creek, Ochre River, Edwards Creek Drain, Vermillion River, Wilson River, Valley River, Mowat Creek and the Mink River.

Rainbow Beach on Dauphin Lake

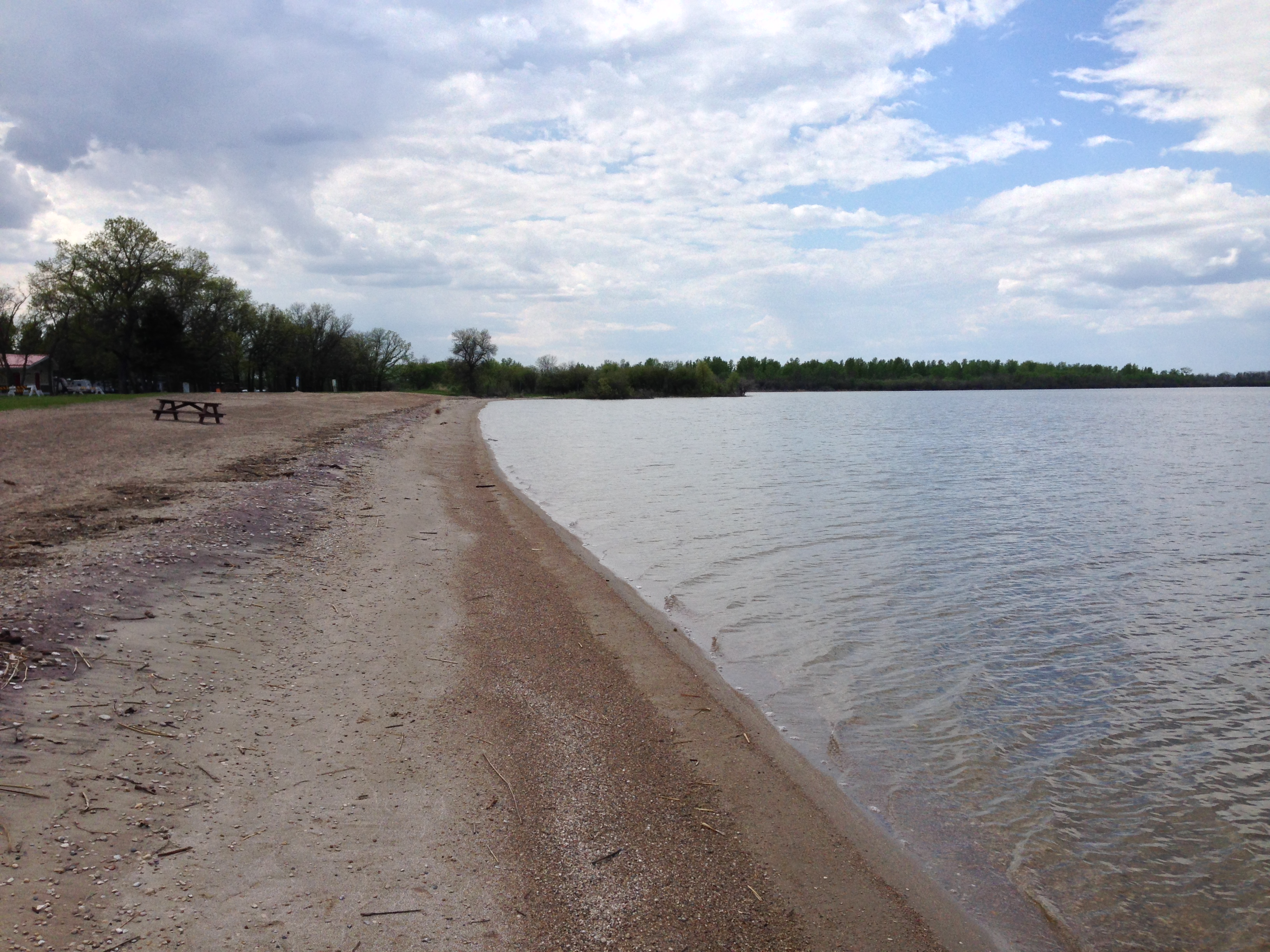

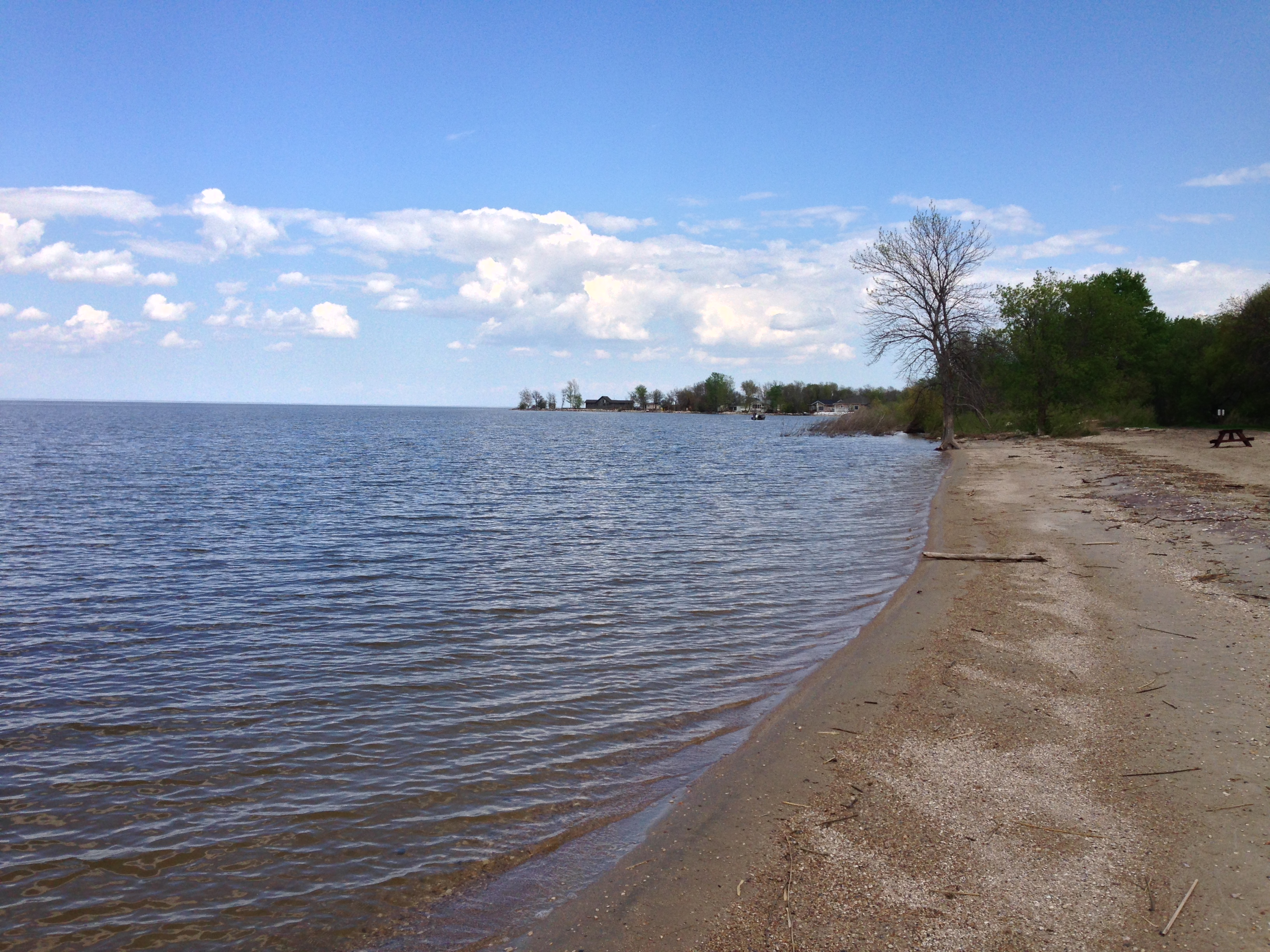

== See also ==
- List of lakes of Manitoba
