= Grand Rapids, Manitoba =

Town in Manitoba, Canada

Grand Rapids
- Town
- Town of Grand Rapids
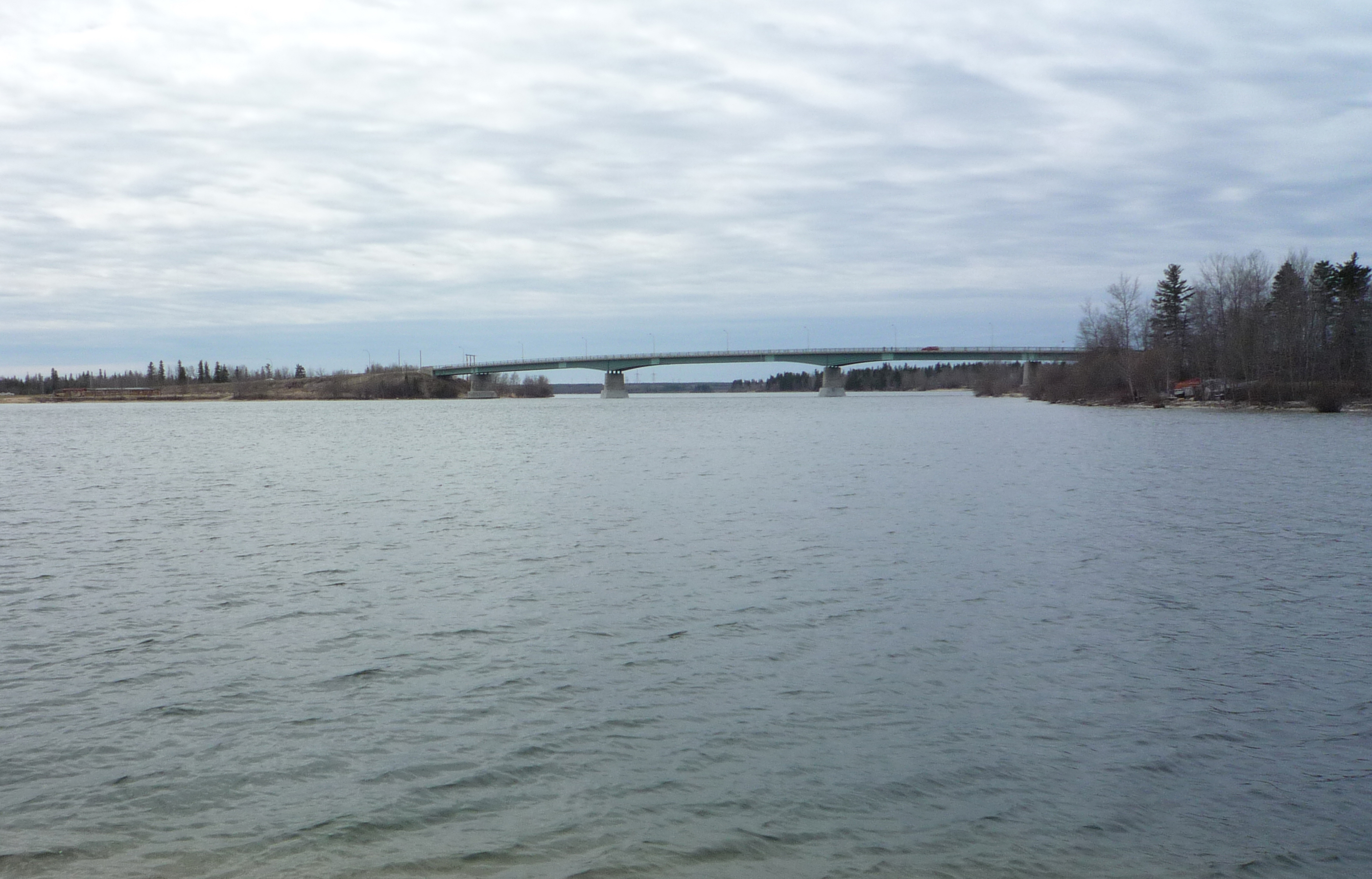
- The Highway 6 bridge crossing the Saskatchewan River at Grand Rapids, 2009

- Location within Manitoba
- Coordinates: 53°12′30″N 99°18′00″W
- Country: Canada
- Province: Manitoba
- Region: Northern Manitoba
- Settled: 1877

Area
  - Total: 85.95 km^{2} (33.19 sq mi)

Population (2016)
  - Total: 268
  - Density: 3.1/km^{2} (8.0/sq mi)
  - Change 2011-2016: ▼3.9%
- Time zone: UTC–6 (CST)
  - Summer (DST): UTC−5 (CDT)
- Postal code: R0C 1E0
- Area code: 204

Grand Rapids is a town in Manitoba, Canada, on the northwestern shore of Lake Winnipeg where the Saskatchewan River enters the lake. As the name implies, the river had a significant drop at this point: more than 75 ft (23 m) in less than 3 mi (4.8 km). In modern days, a large hydroelectric plant has been built there. Cedar Lake, a short distance upriver, provides a natural water source for the plant. Provincial Trunk Highway 6, the region's primary roadway, crosses the Saskatchewan River at the Grand Rapids Bridge.

Grand Rapids was on the main canoe route toward the West, where Fort Bourbon once stood. It is also across the river from the Misipawistik Cree Nation.

In 1894, fire destroyed a number of buildings in the Grand Rapids docks. The steamboat Colvile also caught fire and was destroyed.

== History ==
The first Fort Bourbon was built here in 1741 but was soon moved. Grand Rapids was the only significant obstacle on the Saskatchewan-North Saskatchewan between the Rocky Mountains and Lake Winnipeg. Going downstream the rapids were usually run demi-chargé using the south channel. Upstream the boats were pulled by towlines. In the 1780s the Hudson's Bay Company (HBC) began to use York boats on the river. A log road was constructed so that these large boats could be hauled on rollers.

Here in June 1819, in retaliation for the Battle of Seven Oaks HBC governor William Williams captured a number of North West Company men. The next year, the Nor'Westers captured some HBC men at the same spot. See Pemmican War.

In the 1870s the railroad reached Lake Winnipeg and steamboats appeared on the lake and river. In 1877 a 4.8-kilometre-long (3 mi) narrow-gauge railway using horse-drawn tramcars was built around the rapids. The spread of railways made the tramway obsolete and the HBC closed it in 1909. It was used for tourist excursions for the next forty years. By the 1980s remains were still visible and parts of the trail were still in use.

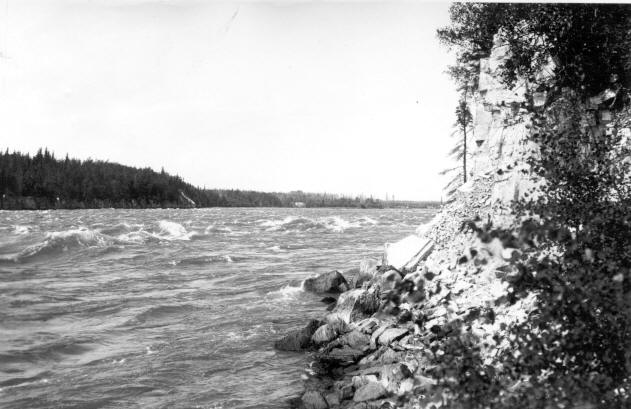
The Grand Rapids in 1921

From 1882 to 1905, Grand Rapids was located in the District of Saskatchewan, a subdivision of the North-West Territories (NWT). After Saskatchewan was established as province in 1905, the portion of the old district east of the new provincial border, including Grand Rapids, became part of the Keewatin District of the NWT. In 1912, Grand Rapids became part of Manitoba because of the Manitoba Boundaries Extension Act.

== Demographics ==
In the 2021 Census of Population conducted by Statistics Canada, Grand Rapids had a population of 213 living in 92 of its 150 total private dwellings, a change of −20.5% from its 2016 population of 268. With a land area of 74.27 km^{2} (28.68 sq mi), it had a population density of 2.9/km^{2} (7.4/sq mi) in 2021.

== Climate ==
Grand Rapids has a humid continental climate (Koppen: Dfb) with vast seasonal differences. Summers are warm with occasional heat waves, although moderated by its relatively high latitude and proximity to the lake areas of Manitoba, resulting in seasonal lag in spring. In winter any moderation is eliminated because of lake freezing and its vast distance to oceans. As a result, winters are cold to severely cold. January has colder than −18 °C (0 °F) daily means.

Climate data for Grand Rapids (1981–2010 normals)
| Month | Jan | Feb | Mar | Apr | May | Jun | Jul | Aug | Sep | Oct | Nov | Dec | Year |
|---|---|---|---|---|---|---|---|---|---|---|---|---|---|
| Record high °C (°F) | 7.5 (45.5) | 9.0 (48.2) | 17.0 (62.6) | 28.0 (82.4) | 32.5 (90.5) | 36.5 (97.7) | 37.5 (99.5) | 35.0 (95.0) | 31.7 (89.1) | 25.0 (77.0) | 17.5 (63.5) | 7.8 (46.0) | 37.5 (99.5) |
| Mean daily maximum °C (°F) | −13.5 (7.7) | −9.9 (14.2) | −2.8 (27.0) | 6.4 (43.5) | 13.9 (57.0) | 20.1 (68.2) | 23.8 (74.8) | 22.7 (72.9) | 15.8 (60.4) | 7.6 (45.7) | −2.8 (27.0) | −10.7 (12.7) | 5.9 (42.6) |
| Daily mean °C (°F) | −18.2 (−0.8) | −15 (5) | −8.3 (17.1) | 1.1 (34.0) | 8.3 (46.9) | 14.9 (58.8) | 18.8 (65.8) | 17.8 (64.0) | 11.3 (52.3) | 3.8 (38.8) | −6.5 (20.3) | −14.9 (5.2) | 1.1 (34.0) |
| Mean daily minimum °C (°F) | −22.9 (−9.2) | −20.0 (−4.0) | −13.7 (7.3) | −4.2 (24.4) | 2.7 (36.9) | 9.7 (49.5) | 13.8 (56.8) | 12.8 (55.0) | 6.8 (44.2) | 0.1 (32.2) | −10.1 (13.8) | −19.2 (−2.6) | −3.7 (25.3) |
| Record low °C (°F) | −43.0 (−45.4) | −41.1 (−42.0) | −36.1 (−33.0) | −26.1 (−15.0) | −13.3 (8.1) | −3.5 (25.7) | 2.0 (35.6) | −1.0 (30.2) | −9.0 (15.8) | −16.0 (3.2) | −32.5 (−26.5) | −39.4 (−38.9) | −43.0 (−45.4) |
| Average precipitation mm (inches) | 17.6 (0.69) | 13.2 (0.52) | 21.5 (0.85) | 26.1 (1.03) | 52.1 (2.05) | 76.9 (3.03) | 71.4 (2.81) | 66.1 (2.60) | 59.3 (2.33) | 38.3 (1.51) | 26.1 (1.03) | 22.4 (0.88) | 491.0 (19.33) |
| Average snowfall cm (inches) | 17.6 (6.9) | 13.0 (5.1) | 17.6 (6.9) | 12.0 (4.7) | 4.8 (1.9) | 0.0 (0.0) | 0.0 (0.0) | 0.0 (0.0) | 0.3 (0.1) | 8.3 (3.3) | 20.4 (8.0) | 22.4 (8.8) | 116.3 (45.8) |
Source: Environment Canada

== Notable people ==
- Darla Contois, writer, actress
- Duncan Mercredi, poet
- Ovide Mercredi, politician
- M. A. Yewdale, artist
