= Waterhen Lake (Manitoba) =

Lake in Manitoba, Canada

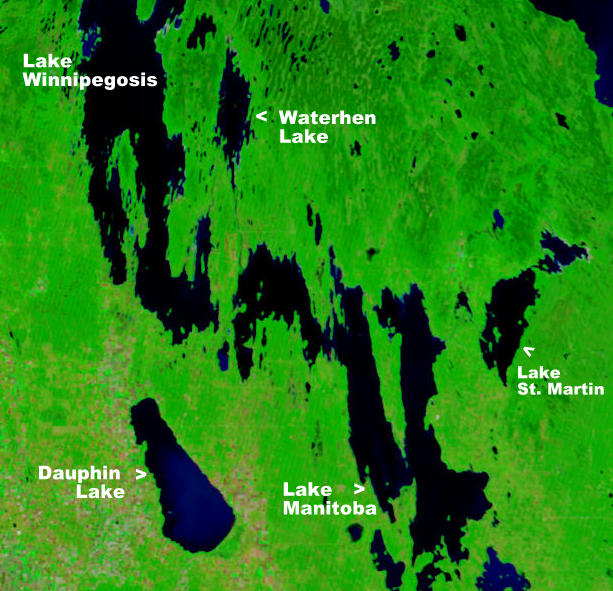
- Location of Waterhen Lake east of Lake Winnipegosis

- Location of the lake in Manitoba Waterhen Lake (Canada)
- Location: Manitoba
- Coordinates: 52°6′12″N 99°33′30″W
- Primary inflows: West Waterhen River, Little Waterhen River
- Primary outflows: Waterhen River (to Lake Manitoba)
- Basin countries: Canada

Waterhen Lake is a lake in Manitoba, Canada, located about 300 km north of the provincial capital of Winnipeg, between Lake Winnipeg and Lake Winnipegosis.

From Long Island Bay at the southeast end of Lake Winnipegosis the West Waterhen and Little Waterhen rivers flow north about 16 km (10 miles) into Waterhen Lake then the Waterhen River flows south 22 km (13.5 miles) into the northern end of Lake Manitoba.

Waterhen Indian Reserve No. 45, aka "Waterhen", which is the reserve community of the Skownan First Nation, is located on its south shore.

== See also ==
- List of lakes of Manitoba
