= Waterhen River (Manitoba) =

Watercourse in Manitoba, Canada

Coordinates: 51°44′02″N 99°32′04″W

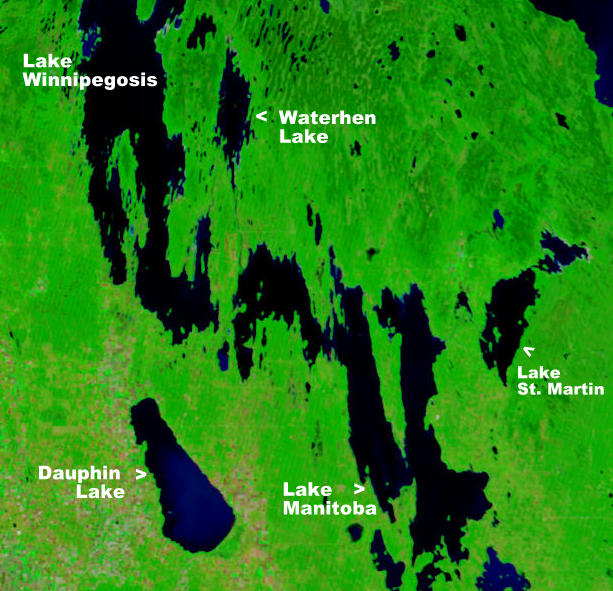
The Waterhen River flows south to Lake Manitoba from Waterhen Lake.

The Waterhen River (French: Rivière de la Poule d'Eau) is a river of Manitoba, Canada. It is the primary outflow for Lake Winnipegosis and flows into Lake Manitoba.

From Long Island Bay at the southeast end of the Lake Winnipegosis the West Waterhen and Little Waterhen rivers flow north about 16 kilometres (10 mi) into Waterhen Lake then the Waterhen River flows south 22 kilometres (14 mi) into Lake Manitoba.

The eponymous community of Waterhen is located along the river.

== Gallery ==
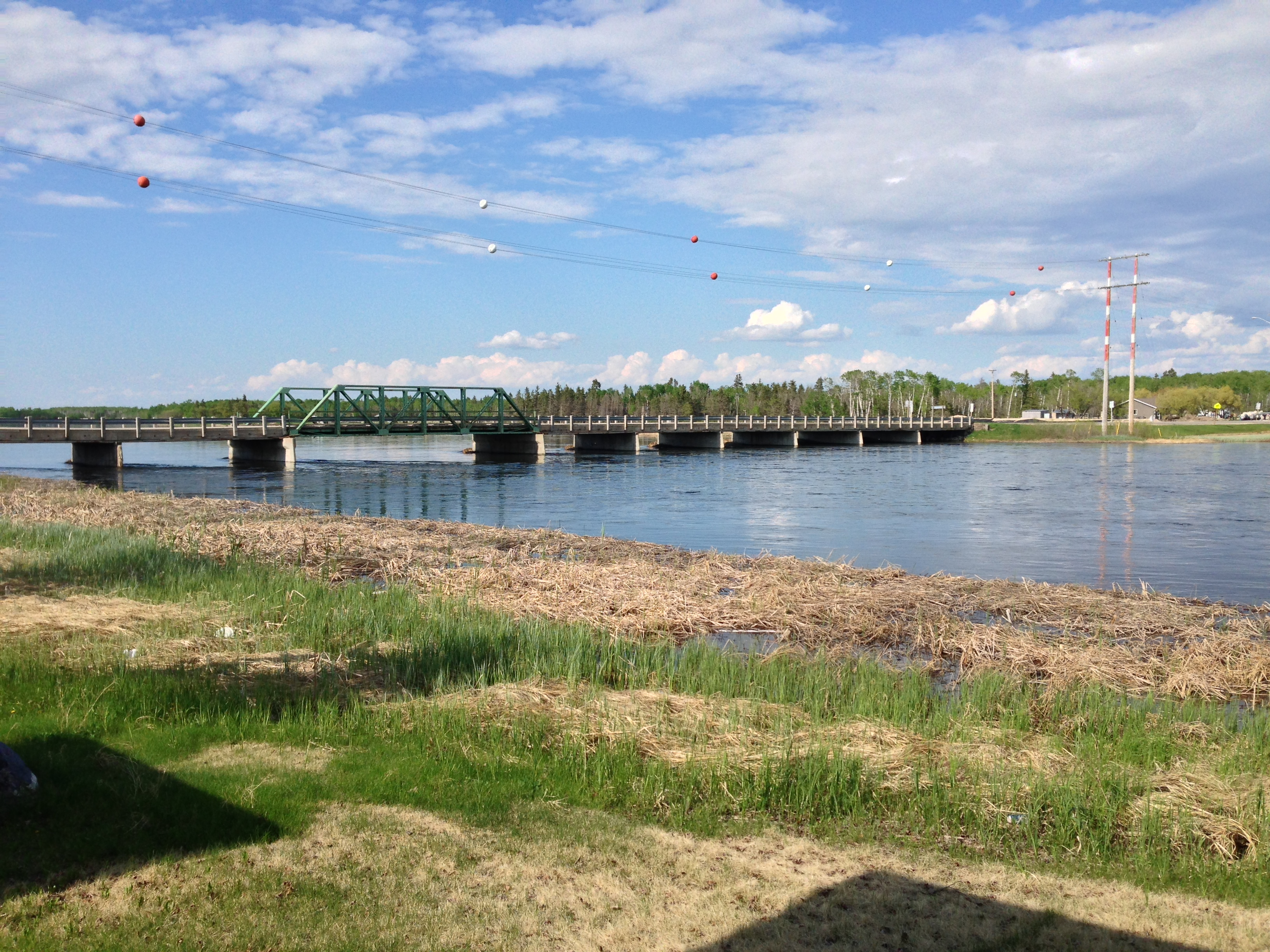
PR 328 Bridge across the Waterhen River

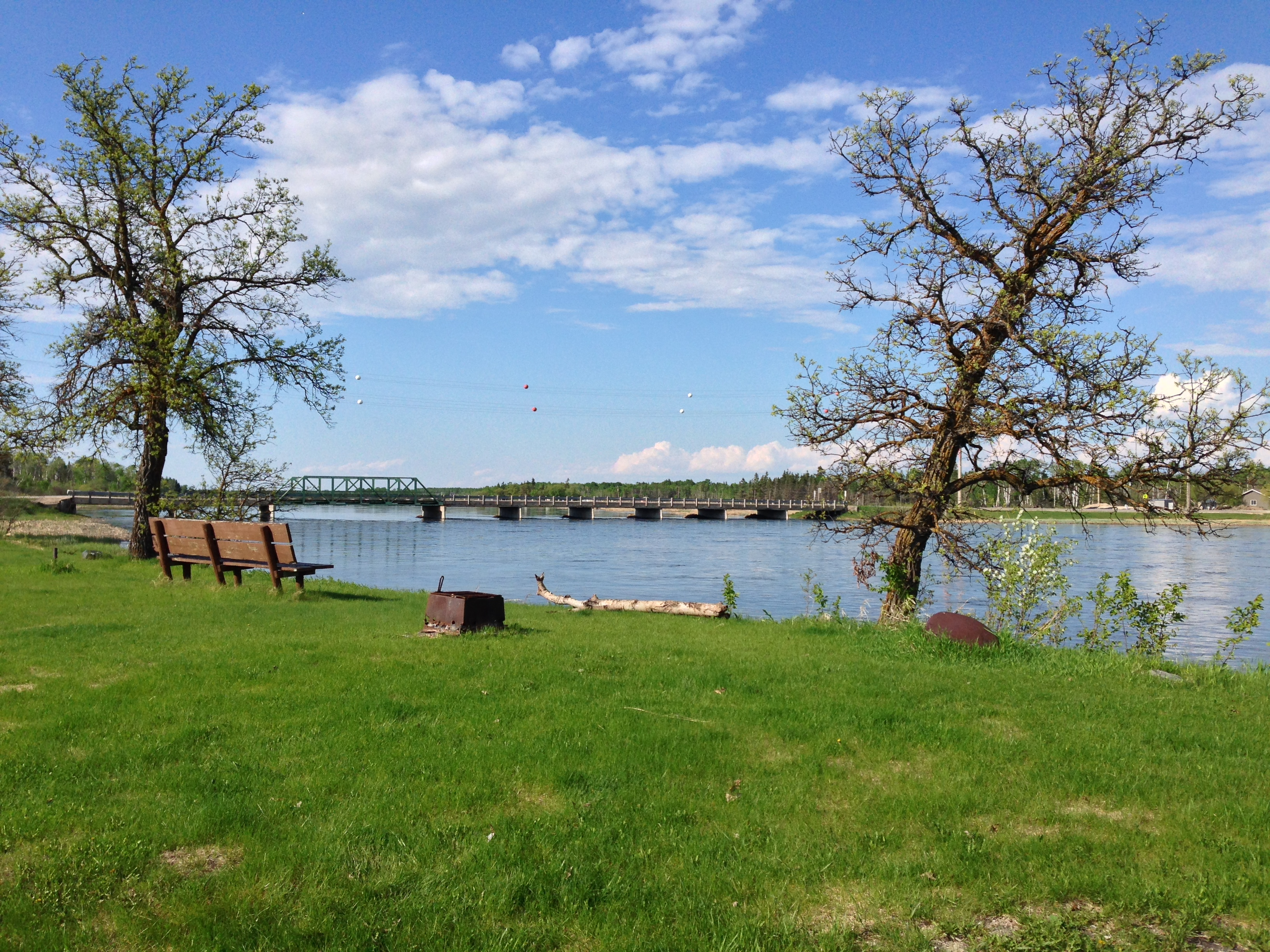
Waterhen River from Waterhen Park

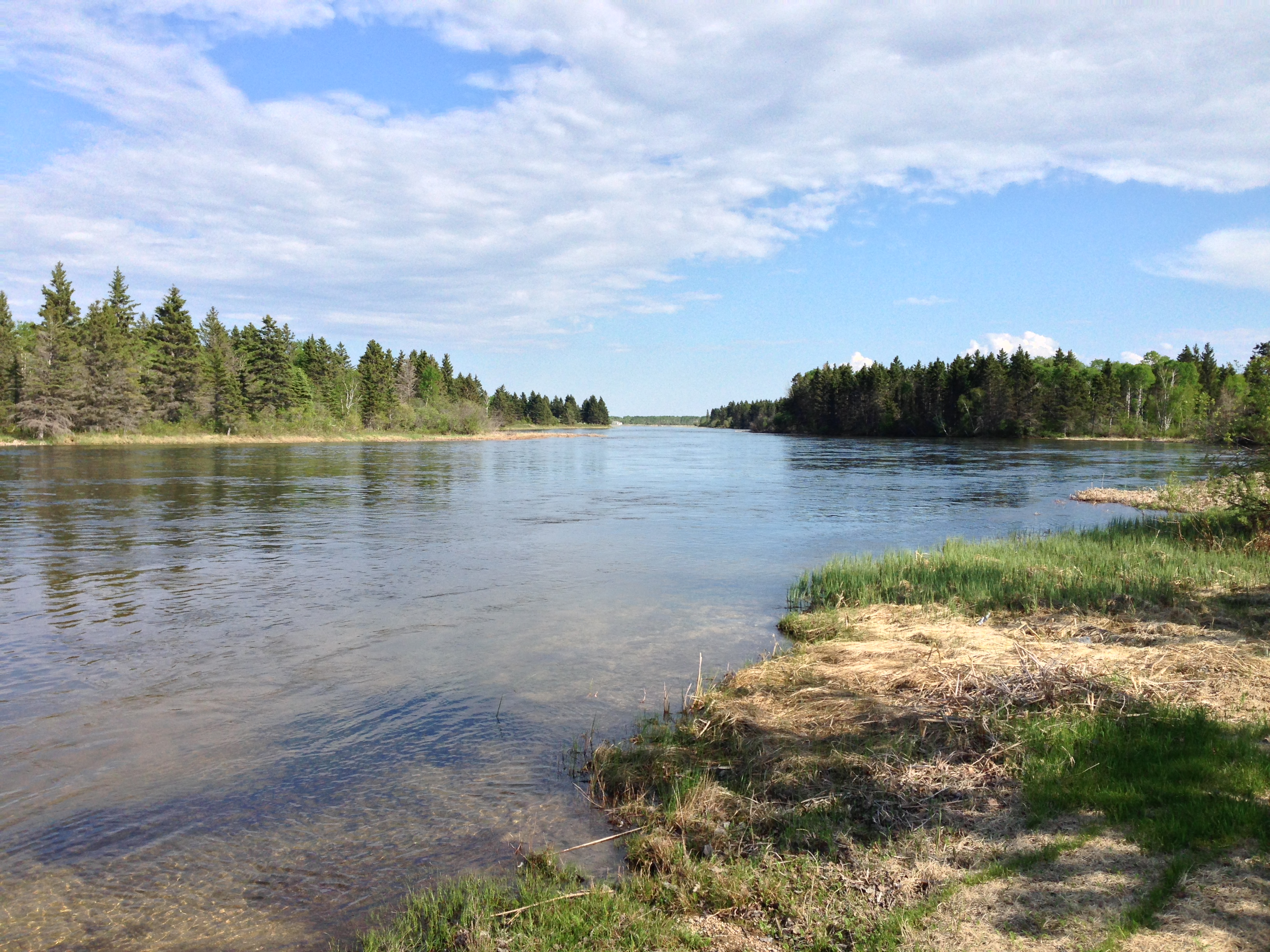
Waterhen River looking south from Waterhen Park

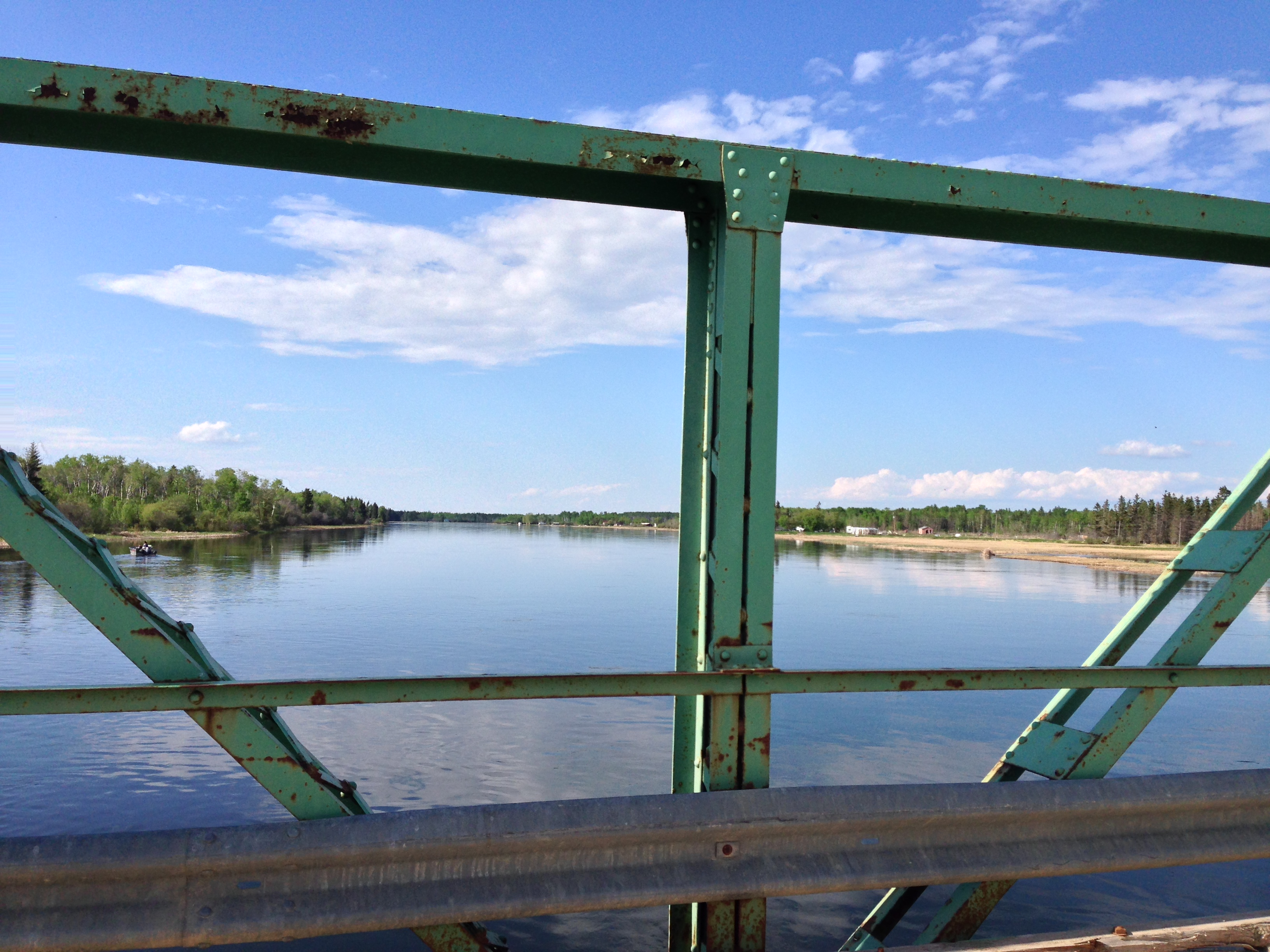
Waterhen River looking north from PR 328 Bridge

== See also ==
- List of rivers of Manitoba
- Waterhen, Manitoba
