= Lake Winnipegosis =

Glacial lake in Manitoba, Canada

- Location of the lake in Manitoba Lake Winnipegosis (Canada)

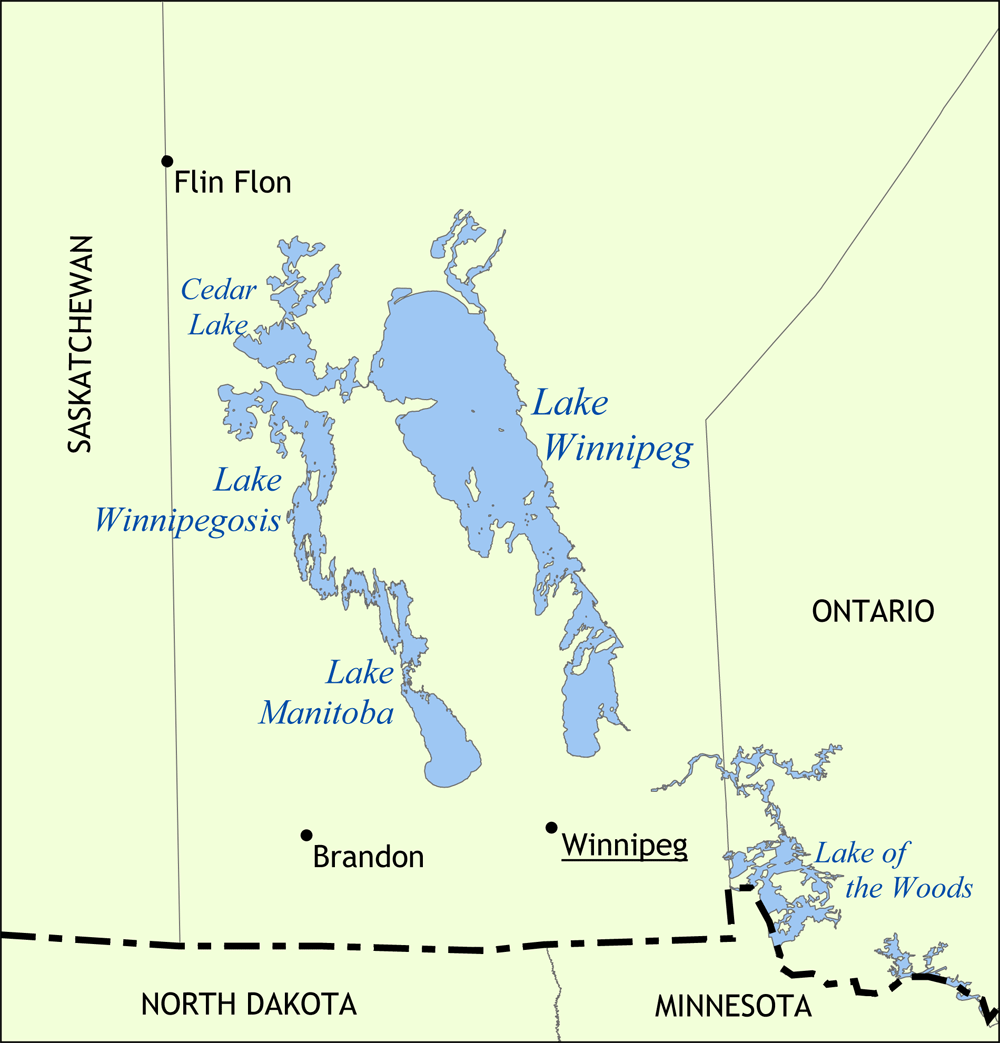
- Location: Manitoba
- Coordinates: 52°30′N 100°00′W
- Lake type: Glacial
- Primary outflows: Waterhen River
- Catchment area: 49,825 km^{2} (19,238 sq mi)
- Basin countries: Canada
- Max. length: 195 km (121 mi)
- Max. width: 51 km (32 mi)
- Surface area: 5,370 km^{2} (2,070 sq mi)
- Max. depth: 12 m (39 ft)
- Surface elevation: 254 m (833 ft)
- Settlements: Camperville, Winnipegosis

Lake Winnipegosis is a large (5,370 km^{2}) lake in central North America, in Manitoba, Canada, some 300 km northwest of Winnipeg. It is Canada's eleventh-largest lake.

The lake's name derives from that of Lake Winnipeg, with a diminutive suffix. Winnipeg means 'big muddy waters' and Winnipegosis means 'little muddy waters', both characterized by coastal wetlands.

It appears as Winipgassish on the Fidler map of 1820, while modern spelling dates from as early as 1811.

== Geography ==
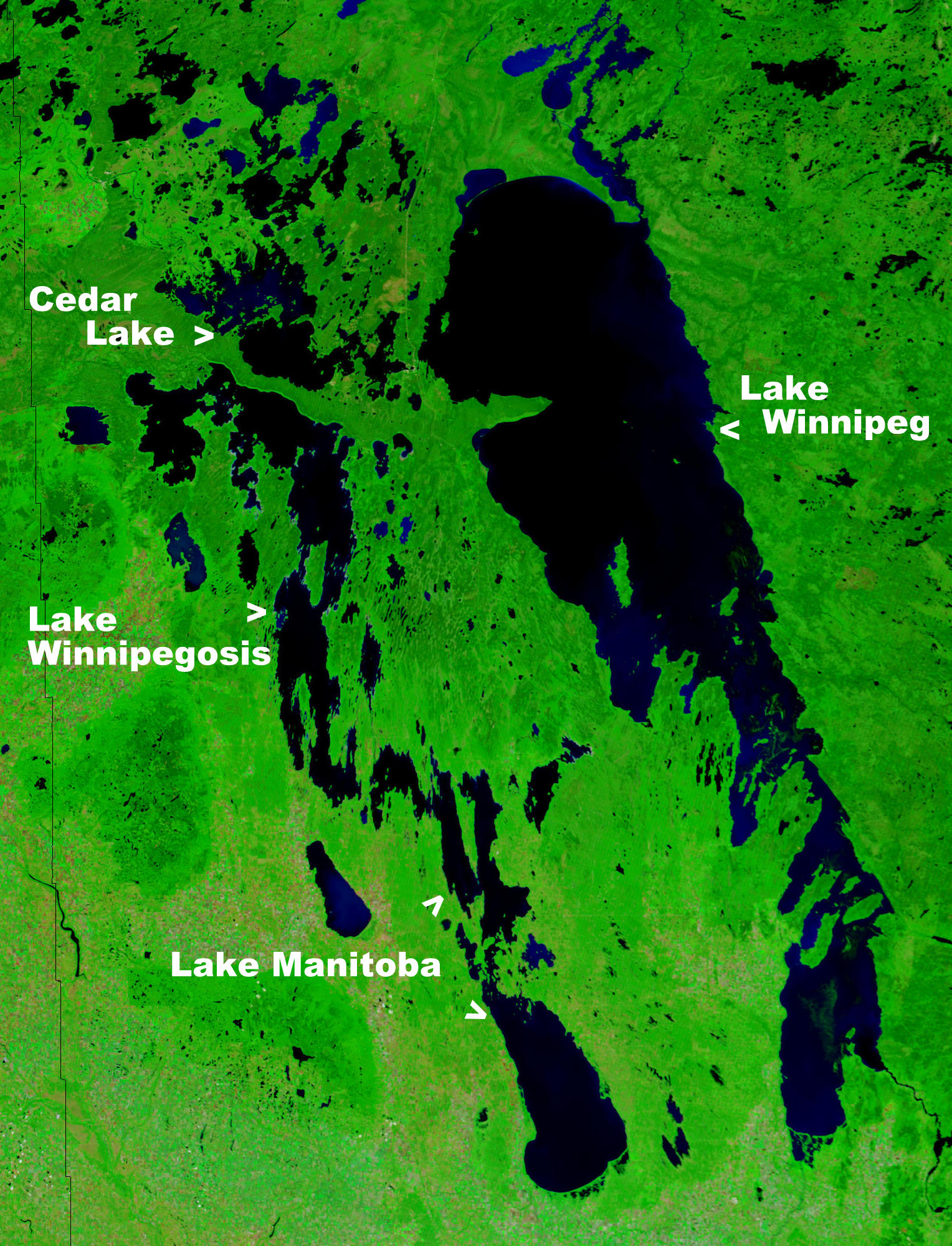
NASA image of Lake Winnipegosis

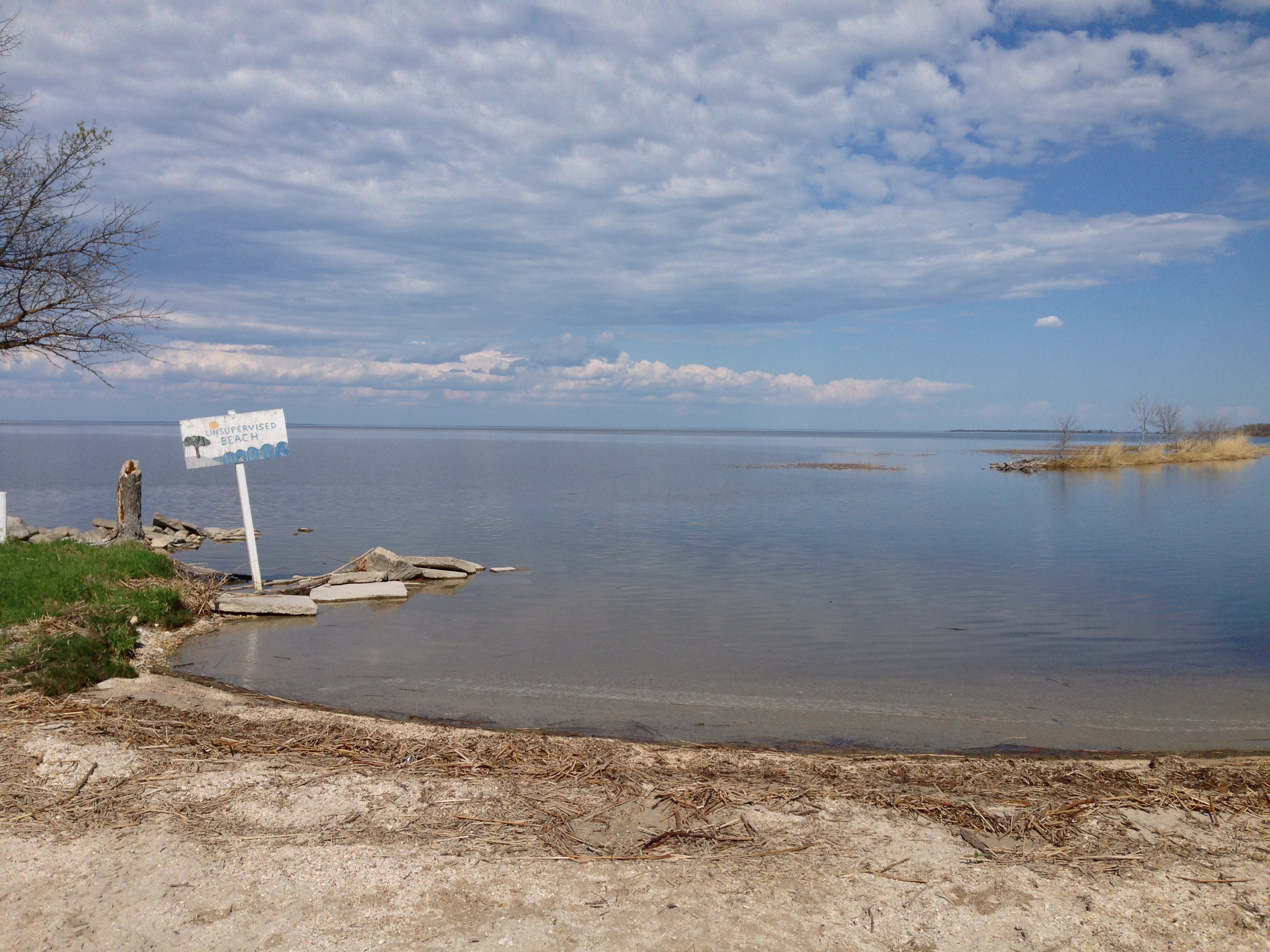
Lake Winnipegosis from Winnipegosis Beach

The elongated 195-kilometre-long lake is the second-largest of three large lakes in central Manitoba; the other two are Lake Winnipeg, the largest, and Lake Manitoba. All three lakes are on the floor of the prehistoric glacial Lake Agassiz (as are nearby Cedar Lake and the Lake of the Woods). The lake's watershed extends over some 49,825 km^{2} in Manitoba and Saskatchewan. It receives most of its waters from the Manitoba Escarpment.

Lake Winnipegosis is separated from Cedar Lake by a 6 km (3.7 miles) wide (minimum width) land barrier at the north end and from Lake Manitoba by a 3 km (1.9 miles) wide (minimum width) land barrier at the southeast end at Meadow Portage.

Birch Island is the largest island on Lake Winnipegosis. The island, located near the middle of the lake, is part of Birch Island Provincial Park, created in 2010, and is adjacent to the Chitek Lake Park Reserve on the eastern shore.

=== Outflows ===
The lake drains through the Waterhen River into Lake Manitoba, and is thus part of the Lake Winnipeg, Nelson River, and Hudson Bay watersheds. From Long Island Bay at the southeast end of the lake the West Waterhen and Little Waterhen rivers flow north about 16 km (10 miles) into Waterhen Lake then the Waterhen River flows south 22 km (13.5 miles) into Lake Manitoba.

=== Tributaries ===
Tributaries include the Mossey River (from Dauphin Lake), Point River, Pine River, North Duck River, Pelican River (from Pelican Lake), Shoal River (from Swan Lake), Steeprock River, Red Deer River, and the Overflowing River.

== Communities ==
The communities of Winnipegosis, Camperville, Pine Creek, Duck Bay, Salt Point and Meadow Portage are south of Birch Island while Shoal River, Pelican Rapids, Dawson Bay and Denbeigh Point are to the north of the island.

== Fisheries ==
The lake is classified as a multi-use fishery which supports Indigenous domestic harvest, commercial fishery of walleye and other freshwater species, and recreational angling. Northern pike and mullet together now account for over 80 percent of its commercial fishing.

== See also ==
- List of lakes of Manitoba
- Winnipegosis komatiite belt
