= List of communities in Manitoba =

Communities in the province of Manitoba, Canada include incorporated municipalities, unincorporated communities and First Nations communities.

Types of incorporated municipalities include urban municipalities, rural municipalities and local government districts. Urban municipalities can be named as cities, towns, villages or simply urban municipalities.

The administration of urban and rural municipalities is regulated by The Municipal Act. Some municipalities have since amalgamated, making this list inaccurate.

In the 2011 Census, Manitoba's communities combined for a total provincial population of 1,208,268.

== Municipalities ==
=== Urban municipalities ===
Manitoba has 79 urban municipalities, which includes the sub-types of cities, towns and villages.

==== Cities ====
Manitoba has 10 cities.

Cities in Manitoba
| Name | Region | Council type | Council size | 2021 Canadian census | | | | | Incorporation date |
| Name | Region | Council type | Council size | Population (2021) | Population (2016) | Change | Land area (km^{2}) | Population density | Incorporation date |
|---|---|---|---|---|---|---|---|---|---|
| Brandon | Westman | Ward | 10 | 51,313 | 48,883 | +5.0% | 79.04 | 649.2/km^{2} | May 30, 1882 |
| Dauphin | Parkland | At-large | 6 | 8,368 | 8,369 | 0.0% | 12.67 | 660.5/km^{2} | March 20, 1998 |
| Flin Flon (part) (Note: Part of Flin Flon is located in Saskatchewan; only the part in Manitoba is included.) | Northern | At-large | 6 | 4,940 | 4,991 | −1.0% | 13.14 | 376.1/km^{2} | June 26, 1970 |
| Morden | Pembina Valley | At-large | 6 | 9,929 | 8,668 | +14.5% | 16.29 | 609.6/km^{2} | August 24, 2012 |
| Portage la Prairie | Central Plains | At-large | 6 | 13,270 | 13,304 | −0.3% | 24.72 | 536.8/km^{2} | February 13, 1907 |
| Selkirk | Interlake & Winnipeg | At-large | 6 | 10,504 | 10,278 | +2.2% | 24.47 | 429.3/km^{2} | June 26, 1998 |
| Steinbach | Eastman | At-large | 6 | 17,806 | 16,022 | +11.1% | 37.56 | 474.1/km^{2} | October 10, 1997 |
| Thompson | Northern | At-large | 8 | 13,035 | 13,678 | −4.7% | 16.62 | 784.3/km^{2} | July 7, 1970 |
| Winkler | Pembina Valley | At-large | 6 | 13,745 | 12,660 | +8.6% | 20.73 | 663.1/km^{2} | April 7, 2002 |
| Winnipeg | Winnipeg | Ward | 15 | 749,607 | 705,244 | +6.3% | 461.78 | 1,623.3/km^{2} | November 8, 1873 |
| All cities | | | | 892,517 | 842,097 | +6.0% | 707.02 | 1,262.4/km^{2} | — |
| Manitoba (Note: The population of Manitoba includes the listed cities as well as the province's other municipalities and population centers.) | | | | 1,342,153 | 1,278,365 | +5.0% | 540,310.19 | 2.5/km^{2} | — |

==== Towns ====
Manitoba has 25 towns.

| Name | Incorporation date | 2016 Census of Population | | | | |
| Name | Incorporation date | Population (2016) | Population (2011) | Change | Land area (km^{2}) | Population density |
|---|---|---|---|---|---|---|
| Altona | December 31, 1945 | 4,212 | 4,088 | +3.0% | 9.38 | 449.0/km^{2} |
| Arborg | January 1, 1964 | 1,232 | 1,152 | +6.9% | 2.21 | 557.5/km^{2} |
| Beausejour | November 5, 1908 | 3,219 | 3,126 | +3.0% | 5.42 | 593.9/km^{2} |
| Carberry | December 20, 1889 | 1,738 | 1,669 | +4.1% | 4.96 | 350.4/km^{2} |
| Carman | November 3, 1899 | 3,164 | 3,027 | +4.5% | 4.34 | 729.0/km^{2} |
| Churchill | January 1, 1959 | 899 | 813 | +10.6% | 53.96 | 16.7/km^{2} |
| Gillam | May 1, 1966 | 1,265 | 1,332 | −5.0% | 1,996.34 | 0.6/km^{2} |
| Grand Rapids | March 1, 1962 | 268 | 279 | −3.9% | 87.04 | 3.1/km^{2} |
| Lac du Bonnet | December 31, 1947 | 1,089 | 1,069 | +1.9% | 2.15 | 506.5/km^{2} |
| Leaf Rapids | December 1, 1971 | 582 | 498 | +16.9% | 1,272.83 | 0.5/km^{2} |
| Lynn Lake | May 9, 1959 | 494 | 674 | −26.7% | 910.23 | 0.5/km^{2} |
| Melita | May 15, 1902 | 1,042 | 1,069 | −2.5% | 3.04 | 342.8/km^{2} |
| Minnedosa | March 2, 1883 | 2,449 | 2,587 | −5.3% | 15.39 | 159.1/km^{2} |
| Morris | January 29, 1883 | 1,885 | 1,797 | +4.9% | 6.10 | 309.0/km^{2} |
| Neepawa | November 23, 1883 | 4,609 | 3,629 | +27.0% | 17.35 | 265.6/km^{2} |
| Niverville | January 1, 1969 | 4,610 | 3,540 | +30.2% | 8.69 | 530.5/km^{2} |
| The Pas | May 17, 1912 | 5,369 | 5,513 | −2.6% | 49.52 | 108.4/km^{2} |
| Powerview-Pine Falls | January 1, 1951 | 1,316 | 1,314 | +0.2% | 5.02 | 262.2/km^{2} |
| Snow Lake | June 2, 1947 | 899 | 723 | +24.3% | 1,211.89 | 0.7/km^{2} |
| Ste. Anne | January 1, 1963 | 2,114 | 1,626 | +30.0% | 4.23 | 499.8/km^{2} |
| Stonewall | August 14, 1906 | 4,809 | 4,536 | +6.0% | 5.99 | 802.8/km^{2} |
| Swan River | May 11, 1908 | 4,014 | 3,907 | +2.7% | 7.16 | 560.6/km^{2} |
| Teulon | May 6, 1919 | 1,201 | 1,124 | +6.9% | 3.23 | 371.8/km^{2} |
| Virden | August 2, 1890 | 3,322 | 3,114 | +6.7% | 8.97 | 370.3/km^{2} |
| Winnipeg Beach | November 2, 1909 | 1,145 | 1,011 | +13.3% | 3.87 | 295.9/km^{2} |
| Total | — | 56,946 | 53,217 | +7.0% | 5,699.31 | 10.0/km^{2} |

==== Villages ====
Manitoba has 2 villages. The second section of this table shows places that are no longer villages, but that were villages just before their reclassification in 2015 (or in some cases an earlier date).

Villages of Manitoba
| Name | Population (2016) | Population (2011) | Change (%) | Area (km²) | Population density |
|---|---|---|---|---|---|
| Dunnottar | 763 | 696 | 8.7 | 2.8 | 272.5 |
| St-Pierre-Jolys | 1,170 | 1,099 | 6.5 | 2.6 | 450.0 |
| Total villages | 1,933 | 1,795 | 7.7 | 5.4 | 358.0 |
| Name | Dissolved | Currently part of | | | |
| Benito | January 1, 2015 | Municipality of Swan Valley West | | | |
| Binscarth | January 1, 2015 | Municipality of Russell – Binscarth | | | |
| Bowsman | January 1, 2015 | Municipality of Minitonas – Bowsman | | | |
| Cartwright | January 1, 2015 | Cartwright – Roblin Municipality | | | |
| Crystal City | January 1, 2015 | Municipality of Louise | | | |
| Elkhorn | January 1, 2015 | Rural Municipality of Wallace – Woodworth | | | |
| Ethelbert | January 1, 2015 | Municipality of Ethelbert | | | |
| Foxwarren | January 1, 1967 | Prairie View Municipality | | | |
| Garson | January 1, 2003 | Rural Municipality of Brokenhead | | | |
| Glenboro | January 1, 2015 | Municipality of Glenboro – South Cypress | | | |
| Great Falls | January 1, 1973 | Rural Municipality of Alexander | | | |
| McCreary | January 1, 2015 | Municipality of McCreary | | | |
| Napinka | January 1, 1986 | Municipality of Brenda – Waskada | | | |
| Notre Dame de Lourdes | January 1, 2015 | Notre-Dame-de-Lourdes, Manitoba | | | |
| Powerview | May 1, 2005 | Town of Powerview-Pine Falls | | | |
| Riverton | January 1, 2015 | Municipality of Bifrost – Riverton | | | |
| St. Claude | January 1, 2015 | Rural Municipality of Grey | | | |
| St. Lazare | January 1, 2015 | Rural Municipality of Ellice – Archie | | | |
| Somerset | January 1, 2015 | Municipality of Lorne | | | |
| Waskada | January 1, 2015 | Municipality of Brenda – Waskada | | | |
| Wawanesa | January 1, 2015 | Municipality of Oakland – Wawanesa | | | |
| Winnipegosis | January 1, 2015 | Rural Municipality of Mossey River | | | |

=== Rural municipalities ===
Manitoba has 116 rural municipalities.

Rural municipalities of Manitoba
| Rural municipality (RM) | Administrative seat | Incorporation date | 2016 Census of Population | | | | |
| Rural municipality (RM) | Administrative seat | Incorporation date | Population (2021) | Population (2016) | Change | Land area (km^{2}) | Population density |

=== Local government districts ===
Manitoba has two local government districts.

| Name | Population (2011) | Population (2006) | Change (%) | Area (km²) | Population density |
|---|---|---|---|---|---|
| Mystery Lake | 10 | 0 | — | 3,464.06 | 0 |
| Pinawa | 1,444 | 1,450 | −0.4 | 128.47 | 11.2 |
| Total local government districts | 1,454 | 1,450 | 0.3 | 3,592.53 | 0.4 |

== Unincorporated communities ==
- Alonsa
- Angusville
- Anola
- Argyle
- Ashern
- Ashville
- Aubigny
- Austin
- Badger
- Bakers Narrows
- Baldur
- Birch River
- Birds Hill
- Blumenort
- Brochet
- Brunkild
- Bruxelles
- Caliento
- Camper
- Camperville
- Chater
- Chortitz
- Clearwater
- Cottonwoods
- Cormorant
- Cranberry Portage
- Cromer
- Cross Lake
- Cypress River
- Domain
- Dominion City
- Douglas
- Duck Bay
- Dugald
- Easterville
- East Selkirk
- Elie
- Elgin
- Elm Creek
- Elma
- Elphinstone
- Eriksdale
- Falcon Lake
- Fisher Branch
- Forrest
- Fort Alexander
- Foxwarren
- Fraserwood
- Friedensfeld
- Friedensfeld West
- Friedensruh
- Garden Hill
- Gardenton
- Garson
- Gimli
- Glenlea
- Gods Lake Narrows
- Gods River
- Goose Creek
- Gretna, Manitoba
- Grand Marais
- Grosse Isle
- Grunthal
- Gull Harbour
- Gunton
- Gypsumville
- Hadashville
- Hnausa
- Hochfeld
- Hodgson
- Holland
- Île-des-Chênes
- Ilford
- Inwood
- Isabella
- Island Lake
- Jackhead
- Kemnay
- Kenville
- Kenton
- Killarney
- Kleefeld
- Komarno
- La Broquerie
- La Riviere
- Lac Brochet
- Landmark
- Letellier
- Libau
- Little Grand Rapids
- Lockport
- Lorette
- Lundar
- MacGregor
- Marchand
- Matlock
- Miami
- Moose Lake
- Narcisse
- Neelin
- New Bothwell
- Nelson House
- Ninette
- Norway House
- Oakbank
- Oak Bluff
- Oakburn
- Oakville
- Olha
- Onanole
- Oxford House
- Pierson
- Pikwitonei
- Piney
- Pipestone
- Prawda
- Pukatawagan
- Red Sucker Lake
- Reinfeld
- Rembrandt
- Reston
- Richer
- Riding Mountain
- River Hills
- Roland
- Rosser
- Sandy Hook
- Siglavik
- Southport
- St. Adolphe
- St. Boniface
- St. Georges
- St. François Xavier
- St. James
- St. Jean Baptiste
- St. Laurent
- St. Malo
- St. Martin Junction
- St. Theresa Point
- Sandy Bay
- Sandy Lake
- Sanford
- Seven Sisters
- Shamattawa
- Sherridon
- Shilo
- Shoal Lake
- Silver
- South Indian Lake
- South Junction
- Sperling
- Split Lake
- Sprague
- Sprucewoods
- Starbuck
- Steep Rock
- Steep Rock Junction
- Stony Mountain
- Stuartburn
- Sundance
- Sundown
- Tadoule Lake
- Teulon
- Treesbank
- Tolstoi
- Tyndall
- Vassar
- Vista
- Vita
- Waasagomach
- Wabowden
- Wanless
- Warren
- West St. Paul
- Whitemouth
- Winnipeg
- Winnipeg Beach
- Woodlands
- Woodroyd
- Whytewold
- York Factory
- York Landing
- Zbaraz
- Zhoda

=== Hamlets ===
Four unincorporated places in Manitoba are designated as hamlets.

- Howden
- Vogar
- Waldersee
- Wanless

=== Northern communities ===
Manitoba recognizes 57 unincorporated places as northern communities.

- Aghaming
- Baden
- Barrows
- Berens River
- Big Black River
- Bissett
- Brochet
- Camperville
- Cormorant
- Crane River
- Cross Lake
- Dallas
- Dauphin River
- Dawson Bay
- Duck Bay
- Fisher Bay
- Fisher River
- Gods Lake Narrows
- Granville Lake
- Harwill
- Herb Lake Landing
- Homebrook
- Ilford
- Island Lake
- Little Bullhead
- Little Grand Rapids
- Long Body Creek
- Loon Straits
- Mallard
- Manigotagan
- Matheson Island
- Meadow Portage
- Moose Lake
- National Mills
- Nelson House
- Norway House
- Oxford House
- Pelican Rapids
- Pikwitonei
- Pine Dock
- Poplarville
- Poplar River
- Powell
- Princess Harbour
- Red Deer Lake
- Red Rose
- Red Sucker Lake
- Rock Ridge
- Salt Point
- Seymourville
- Sherridon
- South Indian Lake
- Spence Lake
- St. Theresa Point
- Thicket Portage
- Wabowden
- Warren Landing
- Waterhen
- Westgate

=== Settlements ===
Manitoba recognizes 12 unincorporated places as settlements.

- Big Eddy
- Grande Pointe
- Manigotagan
- Manitoba House
- Norway House
- Oak Island
- Oak Point
- Pasquia
- Pine Creek
- Rat River
- St. Malo
- Westbourne

== See also ==
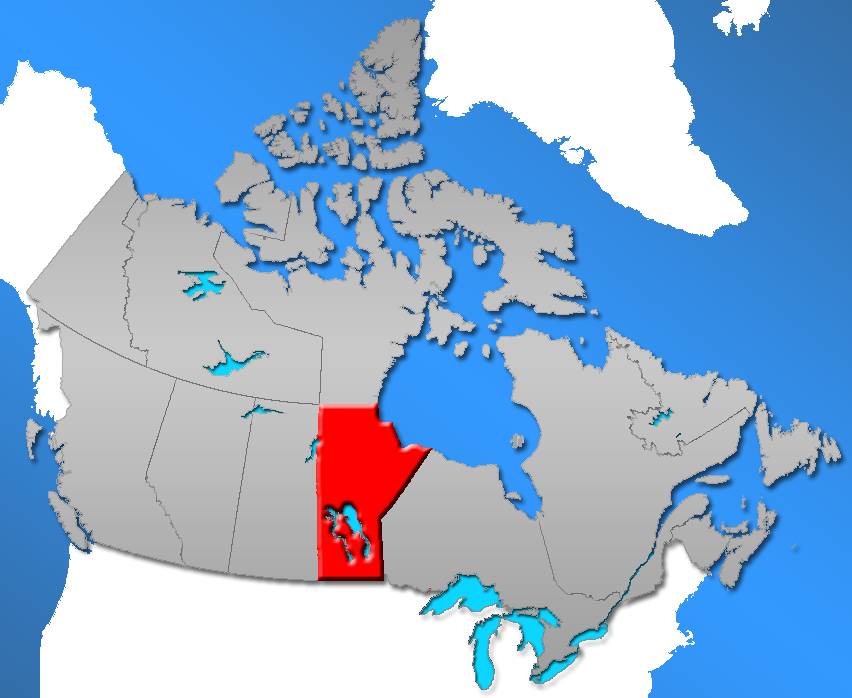
Communities in Canada's provinces and territories
- List of communities in Manitoba by population
- List of municipalities in Manitoba
- List of regions of Manitoba
- List of rural municipalities in Manitoba
