= List of designated places in Manitoba =

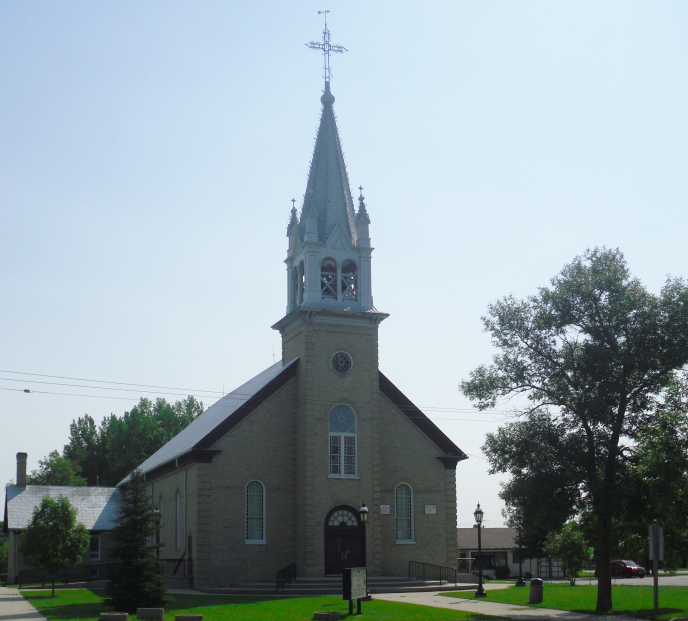
The Notre-Dame de Lorette in Lorette, Manitoba's most populous designated place

A designated place is a type of geographic unit used by Statistics Canada to disseminate census data. It is usually "a small community that does not meet the criteria used to define incorporated municipalities or Statistics Canada population centres (areas with a population of at least 1,000 and no fewer than 400 persons per square kilometre)." Provincial and territorial authorities collaborate with Statistics Canada in the creation of designated places so that data can be published for sub-areas within municipalities. Starting in 2016, Statistics Canada allowed the overlapping of designated places with population centres.

In the 2021 Census of Population, Manitoba had 148 designated places, an increase from 135 in 2016. Designated place types in Manitoba include 9 dissolved municipalities, 44 local urban districts, 46 northern communities, and 48 unincorporated urban centres. In 2021, the 148 designated places had a cumulative population of 89,803 and an average population of 607. Manitoba's largest designated place is Oakbank with a population of 5,041.

== List ==
List of designated places in Manitoba
Name	Type	2021 Census of Population				
Name	Type	Population (2021)	Population (2016)	Change (%)	Land area (km^{2})	Population density (per km^{2})
Aghaming	Northern community	10	15	−33.3%	3.16	3.2/km^{2}
Alexander	Local urban district	321	334	−3.9%	1.38	232.6/km^{2}
Ashern	Local urban district	616	565	+9.0%	3.01	204.7/km^{2}
Austin	Local urban district	415	422	−1.7%	1.9	218.4/km^{2}
Baden	Northern community	10	17	−41.2%	0.67	14.9/km^{2}
Baldur	Local urban district	297	320	−7.2%	2.14	138.8/km^{2}
Barrows	Northern community	83	98	−15.3%	2.68	31.0/km^{2}
Benito	Unincorporated urban centre	360	370	−2.7%	0.85	423.5/km^{2}
Berens River	Northern community	71	135	−47.4%	5.12	13.9/km^{2}
Binscarth	Unincorporated urban centre	420	407	+3.2%	1.4	300.0/km^{2}
Birch River	Local urban district	144	198	−27.3%	1.84	78.3/km^{2}
Birtle	Unincorporated urban centre	625	642	−2.6%	9.26	67.5/km^{2}
Bissett	Northern community	115	108	+6.5%	31.62	3.6/km^{2}
Blumenort	Local urban district	1,738	1,675	+3.8%	3.17	548.3/km^{2}
Boissevain	Dissolved municipality	1,577	1,656	−4.8%	2.9	543.8/km^{2}
Bowsman	Unincorporated urban centre	237	262	−9.5%	2.74	86.5/km^{2}
Brochet	Northern community	64	118	−45.8%	2.76	23.2/km^{2}
Camperville	Northern community	90	487	−81.5%	8.7	10.3/km^{2}
Cartwright	Unincorporated urban centre	353	352	+0.3%	1.88	187.8/km^{2}
Cormorant	Northern community	307	327	−6.1%	18.37	16.7/km^{2}
Cranberry Portage (Kelsey)	Local urban district	608	771	−21.1%	7.26	83.7/km^{2}
Crane River	Northern community	111	152	−27.0%	25.11	4.4/km^{2}
Cross Lake	Northern community	521	443	+17.6%	20.42	25.5/km^{2}
Crystal City	Local urban district	401	389	+3.1%	2.78	144.2/km^{2}
Dallas/Red Rose	Northern community	40	40	0.0%	317.9	0.1/km^{2}
Dauphin River	Northern community	5	20	−75.0%	1.25	4.0/km^{2}
Dawson Bay	Northern community	31	21	+47.6%	1.72	18.0/km^{2}
Deloraine	Unincorporated urban centre	962	978	−1.6%	2.52	381.7/km^{2}
Dominion City	Unincorporated urban centre	319	353	−9.6%	2.56	124.6/km^{2}
Duck Bay	Northern community	350	374	−6.4%	10.81	32.4/km^{2}
Dugald	Unincorporated urban centre	614	580	+5.9%	3.02	203.3/km^{2}
Easterville	Northern community	20	44	−54.5%	3.12	6.4/km^{2}
Elie	Local urban district	705	696	+1.3%	8	88.1/km^{2}
Elkhorn	Local urban district	455	479	−5.0%	2.76	164.9/km^{2}
Elm Creek	Local urban district	405	339	+19.5%	2.68	151.1/km^{2}
Emerson	Local urban district	660	678	−2.7%	7.35	89.8/km^{2}
Erickson	Unincorporated urban centre	473	461	+2.6%	1.29	366.7/km^{2}
Ethelbert	Unincorporated urban centre	314	277	+13.4%	2.66	118.0/km^{2}
Falcon Lake	Unincorporated urban centre	383	272	+40.8%	22.11	17.3/km^{2}
Fisher Bay	Northern community	42	34	+23.5%	56.85	0.7/km^{2}
Fisher Branch	Local urban district	465	452	+2.9%	2.01	231.3/km^{2}
Garson (Tyndall-Garson)	Local urban district	748	647	+15.6%	1.13	661.9/km^{2}
Gilbert Plains	Unincorporated urban centre	773	785	−1.5%	2.74	282.1/km^{2}
Gillam	Retired population centre	836	1,036	−19.3%	1.01	827.7/km^{2}
Gimli	Dissolved municipality	2,070	1,975	+4.8%	2.21	936.7/km^{2}
Gladstone	Unincorporated urban centre	928	889	+4.4%	2.39	388.3/km^{2}
Glenboro	Unincorporated urban centre	544	624	−12.8%	2.69	202.2/km^{2}
Gods Lake Narrows	Northern community	141	89	+58.4%	1.62	87.0/km^{2}
Grand Marais/Grand Beach	Unincorporated urban centre	601	307	+95.8%	2.56	234.8/km^{2}
Grandview	Unincorporated urban centre	808	864	−6.5%	2.82	286.5/km^{2}
Gretna	Unincorporated urban centre	511	541	−5.5%	2.71	188.6/km^{2}
Grunthal	Local urban district	1,782	1,680	+6.1%	2.69	662.5/km^{2}
Hamiota	Unincorporated urban centre	856	841	+1.8%	3.35	255.5/km^{2}
Hartney	Unincorporated urban centre	499	462	+8.0%	2.68	186.2/km^{2}
Harwill	Northern community	15	19	−21.1%	259.6	0.1/km^{2}
Herb Lake Landing	Northern community	16	10	+60.0%	7.49	2.1/km^{2}
Holland	Local urban district	354	354	0.0%	2.7	131.1/km^{2}
Homebrook - Peonan Point	Northern community	26	39	−33.3%	361.28	0.1/km^{2}
Iles des Chenes	Unincorporated urban centre	1,606	1,546	+3.9%	2.03	791.1/km^{2}
Island Lake	Northern community	54	79	−31.6%	3.54	15.3/km^{2}
Killarney	Dissolved municipality	2,490	2,366	+5.2%	5.11	487.3/km^{2}
La Broquerie	Local urban district	1,715	1,401	+22.4%	8.02	213.8/km^{2}
La Rivière	Local urban district	228	208	+9.6%	2.9	78.6/km^{2}
La Salle	Unincorporated urban centre	2,687	2,069	+29.9%	6.97	385.5/km^{2}
Landmark	Local urban district	1,326	1,292	+2.6%	2.97	446.5/km^{2}
Laurier	Unincorporated urban centre	177	154	+14.9%	5.4	32.8/km^{2}
Little Grand Rapids	Northern community	0	15	−100.0%	1.47	0.0/km^{2}
Lockport part A	Unincorporated urban centre	445	458	−2.8%	2.47	180.2/km^{2}
Lockport part B	Unincorporated urban centre	301	288	+4.5%	0.44	684.1/km^{2}
Loon Straits	Northern community	5	10	−50.0%	2.31	2.2/km^{2}
Lorette	Local urban district	3,512	3,208	+9.5%	4.72	744.1/km^{2}
Lundar	Local urban district	499	462	+8.0%	1.1	453.6/km^{2}
MacGregor	Unincorporated urban centre	962	973	−1.1%	2.13	451.6/km^{2}
Mallard	Northern community	102	78	+30.8%	11.21	9.1/km^{2}
Manigotagan	Northern community	173	176	−1.7%	37.06	4.7/km^{2}
Manitou	Unincorporated urban centre	812	840	−3.3%	3.38	240.2/km^{2}
Matheson Island	Northern community	136	101	+34.7%	22.16	6.1/km^{2}
McCreary	Unincorporated urban centre	497	507	−2.0%	1.84	270.1/km^{2}
Meadow Portage	Northern community	72	67	+7.5%	115.61	0.6/km^{2}
Miami	Local urban district	464	434	+6.9%	1.2	386.7/km^{2}
Miniota	Unincorporated urban centre	282	229	+23.1%	0.94	300.0/km^{2}
Minitonas	Unincorporated urban centre	465	465	0.0%	2.19	212.3/km^{2}
Mitchell	Local urban district	2,828	2,279	+24.1%	3.3	857.0/km^{2}
Moose Lake	Northern community	135	200	−32.5%	9.75	13.8/km^{2}
National Mills	Northern community	0	0	NA	2.62	0.0/km^{2}
Nelson House	Northern community	70	71	−1.4%	3.43	20.4/km^{2}
Ninette	Local urban district	249	221	+12.7%	2.02	123.3/km^{2}
Norway House	Northern community	363	478	−24.1%	114.53	3.2/km^{2}
Notre Dame de Lourdes	Local urban district	756	744	+1.6%	2.83	267.1/km^{2}
Oak Bluff	Unincorporated urban centre	1,442	1,051	+37.2%	2.52	572.2/km^{2}
Oak Lake	Unincorporated urban centre	381	407	−6.4%	2.61	146.0/km^{2}
Oakbank	Unincorporated urban centre	5,041	4,604	+9.5%	5.39	935.3/km^{2}
Oakville	Local urban district	652	621	+5.0%	2.71	240.6/km^{2}
Pelican Rapids	Northern community	64	72	−11.1%	3.14	20.4/km^{2}
Pierson	Local urban district	174	190	−8.4%	1.94	89.7/km^{2}
Pikwitonei	Northern community	55	64	−14.1%	7.94	6.9/km^{2}
Pilot Mound	Local urban district	675	627	+7.7%	2.65	254.7/km^{2}
Pine Dock	Northern community	38	47	−19.1%	9.65	3.9/km^{2}
Pine Falls (Powerview-Pine Falls)	Dissolved municipality	616	632	−2.5%	2.41	255.6/km^{2}
Plum Coulee	Unincorporated urban centre	1,040	904	+15.0%	2.44	426.2/km^{2}
Plumas	Local urban district	235	243	−3.3%	0.96	244.8/km^{2}
Powell	Northern community	15	15	0.0%	1.19	12.6/km^{2}
Powerview (Powerview-Pine Falls)	Dissolved municipality	623	684	−8.9%	2.41	258.5/km^{2}
Princess Harbour	Northern community	0	5	−100.0%	1.9	0.0/km^{2}
Rapid City	Local urban district	796	478	+66.5%	5.19	153.4/km^{2}
Red Deer Lake	Northern community	20	10	+100.0%	6.61	3.0/km^{2}
Red Sucker Lake	Northern community	10	15	−33.3%	0.65	15.4/km^{2}
Reston	Local urban district	659	569	+15.8%	5.32	123.9/km^{2}
Richer	Local urban district	607	582	+4.3%	5.37	113.0/km^{2}
Rivers	Dissolved municipality	971	1,325	−26.7%	7.98	121.7/km^{2}
Riverton	Unincorporated urban centre	475	538	−11.7%	1.19	399.2/km^{2}
Roblin	Dissolved municipality	1,709	1,697	+0.7%	3.75	455.7/km^{2}
Rock Ridge	Northern community	64	73	−12.3%	0.88	72.7/km^{2}
Rosenfeld	Local urban district	318	338	−5.9%	2.72	116.9/km^{2}
Rosenort	Local urban district	798	701	+13.8%	10.54	75.7/km^{2}
Rossburn	Unincorporated urban centre	489	512	−4.5%	3.43	142.6/km^{2}
Russell	Dissolved municipality	1,740	1,599	+8.8%	3.14	554.1/km^{2}
Salt Point	Northern community	10	5	+100.0%	30.22	0.3/km^{2}
Sandy Lake	Local urban district	301	264	+14.0%	2.01	149.8/km^{2}
Sanford	Unincorporated urban centre	991	937	+5.8%	6.24	158.8/km^{2}
Seymourville	Northern community	76	95	−20.0%	23.14	3.3/km^{2}
Sherridon	Northern community	56	99	−43.4%	11.88	4.7/km^{2}
Shoal Lake	Unincorporated urban centre	652	701	−7.0%	2.52	258.7/km^{2}
Somerset	Local urban district	420	437	−3.9%	2.32	181.0/km^{2}
Souris	Dissolved municipality	1,970	1,974	−0.2%	3.35	588.1/km^{2}
Spence Lake	Northern community	70	53	+32.1%	29.13	2.4/km^{2}
St. Adolphe	Unincorporated urban centre	1,006	1,057	−4.8%	1.38	729.0/km^{2}
St. Claude	Local urban district	625	603	+3.6%	1.84	339.7/km^{2}
St. Francois Xavier	Unincorporated urban centre	845	662	+27.6%	3.39	249.3/km^{2}
St. Jean Baptiste	Local urban district	576	563	+2.3%	2.02	285.1/km^{2}
St. Malo	Local urban district	1,323	1,227	+7.8%	6.91	191.5/km^{2}
Starbuck	Unincorporated urban centre	363	342	+6.1%	1.26	288.1/km^{2}
Ste. Agathe	Unincorporated urban centre	643	637	+0.9%	4.01	160.3/km^{2}
Ste. Rose du Lac	Unincorporated urban centre	997	1,021	−2.4%	2.48	402.0/km^{2}
St-Lazare	Local urban district	233	257	−9.3%	2.73	85.3/km^{2}
Stony Mountain	Unincorporated urban centre	1,979	1,636	+21.0%	2.67	741.2/km^{2}
Swan Lake	Local urban district	276	255	+8.2%	0.71	388.7/km^{2}
Thicket Portage	Northern community	109	150	−27.3%	7.49	14.6/km^{2}
Treherne	Unincorporated urban centre	650	615	+5.7%	2.04	318.6/km^{2}
Tyndall (Tyndall-Garson)	Local urban district	1,001	935	+7.1%	2.23	448.9/km^{2}
Vita	Local urban district	512	479	+6.9%	3.06	167.3/km^{2}
Wabowden	Northern community	400	442	−9.5%	30.36	13.2/km^{2}
Warren	Local urban district	1,015	818	+24.1%	5.39	188.3/km^{2}
Waskada	Unincorporated urban centre	161	167	−3.6%	0.8	201.3/km^{2}
Waterhen	Northern community	195	152	+28.3%	154.1	1.3/km^{2}
Wawanesa	Unincorporated urban centre	653	594	+9.9%	2.04	320.1/km^{2}
Whitemouth	Unincorporated urban centre	387	303	+27.7%	3.06	126.5/km^{2}
Winnipegosis	Unincorporated urban centre	945	617	+53.2%	2.54	372.0/km^{2}
Total designated places	—	89,803	85,642	+4.9%	2,117.00	42.4/km^{2}
Province of Manitoba	—	1,342,153	1,278,365	+5.0%	540,310.19	2.5/km^{2}

== See also ==
- List of census agglomerations in Manitoba
- List of population centres in Manitoba
