= Manitoba Highway 77 =

Highway in Manitoba

Provincial Trunk Highway 77
- PTH 77 highlighted in red

Route information
- Maintained by Department of Infrastructure
- Length: 42 km (26 mi)
- Existed: 1987–present

Major junctions
- West end: Highway 3 at Saskatchewan border near Westgate
- East end: PTH 10 near Baden

Location
- Country: Canada
- Province: Manitoba
- Rural municipalities: Mountain

Highway system
- Provincial highways in Manitoba; Winnipeg City Routes
← PTH 75	→ PTH 83

Provincial Trunk Highway 77 (PTH 77) is a provincial highway in the Canadian province of Manitoba. It runs from the Saskatchewan boundary (where it meets Highway 3) near Westgate to PTH 10 near Baden. It was designated in 1987, replacing PR 277.

== Route description ==
PTH 77 begins in Division No. 19 at the Saskatchewan border, with the road continuing west across the Armit River towards Armit and Hudson Bay as Saskatchewan Highway 3 (Hwy 3). Immediately bypassing Westgate, the highway heads east through rural woodlands for several kilometers, running along the northern border of the Porcupine Hills and Porcupine Provincial Forest. After passing National Mills and crossing several creeks, it travels through the town of Barrows to have an intersection with Red Deer Lake Road, which provides access to the community of Red Deer Lake and the lake of the same name. PTH 77 winds its way southeast through remote woodlands, traveling through Powell and Baden as well as crossing the Rice River, before entering the Rural Municipality of Mountain and coming to an end at an intersection with PTH 10 (Northern Woods and Water Route) just north of Mafeking along the banks of the Steeprock River.

The entire length of Manitoba Highway 77 is a rural, paved, two-lane highway.

== History ==
Provincial Road 277
- Location: Westgate - Baden
- Length: 42 km (26 mi)
- Existed: 1966–1987

What is now PTH 77 began in 1961 as an unnamed gravel road running from PTH 10 and extending as far west as the community of Powell along the northern boundary of the Porcupine Provincial Forest, switching to dirt at Baden. By 1963, it had been improved to a two-lane gravel road in its entirety, as well as being extended further west past the hamlet of Westgate to the Saskatchewan border, where it continued towards Armit as the newly opened Saskatchewan Highway 3 (Hwy 3). The highway was officially designated as Provincial Road 277 (PR 277) in 1966, as well as gaining a short spur to the community of Red Deer Lake. Becoming fully paved by 1983, the highway was officially re-designated as PTH 77 in 1987, with the route changing very little since then.

== Major intersections ==
Division	Location	km	mi	Destinations	Notes
No. 19	Westgate	0.0	0.0	Highway 3 west – Armit, Hudson Bay	Western terminus; Saskatchewan border; road continues east as Hwy 3
No. 19	Westgate	1.0	0.62	Williamson Road – Westgate	
No. 19	Westgate	1.5	0.93	Delowski Road – Westgate	
No. 19	National Mills	6.4	4.0	Twilight Street – National Mills	
No. 19	Barrows	16.0	9.9	Red Deer Lake Road – Red Deer Lake	
No. 19	Baden	32.8	20.4	Main Street – Baden	
Mountain		42	26	PTH 10 (NWWR) – The Pas, Swan River	Eastern terminus
1.000 mi = 1.609 km; 1.000 km = 0.621 mi
