= Unorganized Division No. 19, Manitoba =

Coordinates: 52.31°N 97.21°W

Division No. 19, Unorganized, or Lake Winnipeg Unorganized, is an unorganized area spanning central Manitoba from east to west, and contains all of Division No. 19 except for First Nations reserves. Unlike in some other provinces, census divisions do not reflect the organization of local government in Manitoba. These areas exist solely for the purposes of statistical analysis and presentation; they have no government of their own.

It has a population of 2,953 as of 2011, and spans an area of 60,410.85 km^{2}.

== Unincorporated communities ==
- Berens River
- Bissett
- Dallas/Red Rose
- Dauphin River
- Fort Alexander
- Island View
- Leaside Beach
- Little Bullhead
- Little Grand Rapids
- Mallard
- Manigotagan
- Matheson Island
- Meadow Portage
- Pine Creek
- Pine Dock
- Princess Harbour
- Rock Ridge
- Seymourville
- Spence Lake
- Waterhen
