= Manitoba Provincial Road 234 =

Provincial road in Manitoba, Canada

Provincial Road 234
- PR 234 highlighted in red

Route information
- Maintained by Department of Infrastructure
- Length: 92.6 km (57.5 mi)
- Existed: 1966–present

Major junctions
- South end: PTH 8 near Riverton
- PR 325 near Washow Bay
- North end: Matheson Island cable ferry dock

Location
- Country: Canada
- Province: Manitoba
- Rural municipalities: Bifrost-Riverton

Highway system
- Provincial highways in Manitoba; Winnipeg City Routes
← PR 233	→ PR 236

Provincial Road 234 (PR 234) is a 92.6-kilometre-long (57.5 mi) north-south gravel highway in the Municipality of Bifrost-Riverton and Unorganized Division No. 19, Interlake Region, Manitoba. It provides all weather road access to the western side of the Lake Winnipeg narrows, the hamlets of Matheson Island and Pine Dock, along with Beaver Creek Provincial Park, connecting them with PTH 8 and the town of Riverton.

== Route description ==
PR 234 begins in the Municipality of Bifrost-Riverton at an intersection with PTH 8 several kilometres north of Riverton, winding its way northward through farmland to travel through the hamlet of Washow Bay and cross Washow Bay Creek. It has an intersection with PR 325 as it enters woodlands and begins winding its way along the coastline of Washow Bay for the next several kilometres. The highway now begins following the coastline of the Lake Winnipeg narrows as it enters Division No. 19, travelling through Beaver Creek Provincial Park and crossing Beaver Creek on its way to Calders Dock. PR 234 winds it way along the coast for several more kilometres to travel past the Pine Dock Airport and the hamlet of Pine Dock itself before passing Little Bullhead and Leaside Beach. The highway curves westward to travel past Island View harbour and a former ferry dock (Ferries to Bloodvein and Princess Harbour shut down in 2015) before coming to an end a few kilometres later at the Matheson Island cable ferry dock. The entire length of Provincial Road 234 is a gravel, two-lane highway.

== Major intersections ==
Division	Location	km	mi	Destinations	Notes
Bifrost-Riverton		0.0	0.0	PTH 8 (Veterans Memorial Highway / Helgi Jones Parkway) – Hecla-Grindstone Provincial Park, Riverton	Southern terminus
Bifrost-Riverton	Washow Bay	3.7	2.3	Road 144N – Washow Bay, Shorncliffe	Former PR 233 west
Bifrost-Riverton		9.7	6.0	Bridge over Washow Bay Creek	
Bifrost-Riverton		15.4	9.6	PR 325 west – Hodgson	Eastern terminus of PR 325
No. 19	Beaver Creek Provincial Park	37.7	23.4	Bridge over Beaver Creek	
No. 19		61.0	37.9	Calders Dock	Access road to Calders Dock
No. 19	Pine Dock	72.3	44.9	Pine Dock Airport	Access road to airport
No. 19	Pine Dock	75.4	46.9	Pine Avenue – Pine Dock	
No. 19		79.0	49.1	Little Bullhead	Access road to Little Bullhead
No. 19		81.1	50.4	Leaside Beach	Access road to Leaside Beach
No. 19	Island View	90.0	55.9	Ferry – Princess Harbour, Bloodvein	Closed since 2015
No. 19		92.6	57.5	Cable Ferry – Matheson Island	Dead end; eastern terminus
1.000 mi = 1.609 km; 1.000 km = 0.621 mi: Closed/former
