= Frontier School Division =

School division in Manitoba, Canada

Coordinates: 55.478°N 97.602°W

Frontier School Division is the largest geographical school division in Manitoba, Canada, covering most schools in northern Manitoba. With 41 schools operating across Manitoba, the Frontier School Division provides educational services to a larger geographical area than any other school division in Canada. A unique organization, the Frontier School Division operates schools in small Manitoba communities that are often only accessible by boat, air (float plane), rail, or winter ice road.

The widespread geography has necessitated that this single school division be sub-divided into five "areas", with the main division office located in Winnipeg, Manitoba.

Located at the Frontier Collegiate Institute campus is the Frontier Collegiate Residence, where high school students from around Area Four and isolated communities that do not have student populations to warrant the operation of a high school program are housed in dormitories so that they may complete their secondary schooling.

In 2022, the Frontier School Division was inducted into the Canadian Fiddle Hall of Honour at the Canadian Grand Masters event in Winnipeg.

== Schools ==
School	Community	Area	Area office
Brochet School	Brochet	1	Thompson, Manitoba
D.R. Hamilton School	Cross Lake	1	Thompson, Manitoba
Gillam School	Gillam	1	Thompson, Manitoba
Julie Lindal School	Ilford	1	Thompson, Manitoba
Leaf Rapids Education Centre	Leaf Rapids	1	Thompson, Manitoba
Mary Newell School	Granville Lake	1	Thompson, Manitoba
Mel Johnson School	Wabowden	1	Thompson, Manitoba
Thunderbird School	South Indian Lake	1	Thompson, Manitoba
Pikwitonei School	Pikwitonei	1	Thompson, Manitoba
Thicket Portage School	Thicket Portage	1	Thompson, Manitoba
West Lynn Heights School	Lynn Lake	1	Thompson, Manitoba
Chan Kagha Otina Dakota Wayawa Tipi School	Birdtail Sioux First Nation	2	Dauphin, Manitoba
Duck Bay School	Duck Bay	2	Dauphin, Manitoba
Grand Rapids School	Grand Rapids	2	Dauphin, Manitoba
Gypsumville School	Gypsumville	2	Dauphin, Manitoba
Lakefront School	Crane River	2	Dauphin, Manitoba
Mountain View School	Barrows	2	Dauphin, Manitoba
Pelican Rapids School	Pelican Rapids	2	Dauphin, Manitoba
Peonan Point School	St. Martin	2	Dauphin, Manitoba
Philomene Chartrand School	Camperville	2	Dauphin, Manitoba
Rorketon School	Rorketon	2	Dauphin, Manitoba
Skownan School	Skownan First Nation	2	Dauphin, Manitoba
Waterhen School	Waterhen	2	Dauphin, Manitoba
Berens River School	Berens River	3	Winnipeg, Manitoba
Black River Anishinabe School	O'Hanley	3	Winnipeg, Manitoba
Disbrowe School	Red Sucker Lake	3	Winnipeg, Manitoba
Duke of Marlborough School	Churchill	3	Winnipeg, Manitoba
Falcon Beach School	Falcon Beach	3	Winnipeg, Manitoba
Matheson Island School	Matheson Island	3	Winnipeg, Manitoba
Ministic School	Gods Lake Narrows	3	Winnipeg, Manitoba
Pine Dock School	Pine Dock	3	Winnipeg, Manitoba
San Antonio School	Bissett	3	Winnipeg, Manitoba
Stevenson Island School	Stevenson Island	3	Winnipeg, Manitoba
Wanipigow School	Wanipigow	3	Winnipeg, Manitoba
Cold Lake School	Sherridon	4	Cranberry Portage
Cormorant Lake School	Cormorant	4	Cranberry Portage
Cranberry Portage Elementary School	Cranberry Portage	4	Cranberry Portage
Frontier Collegiate Institute	Cranberry Portage	4	Cranberry Portage
Frontier Mosakahiken School	Moose Lake	4	Cranberry Portage
Joseph H. Kerr School	Snow Lake	4	Cranberry Portage
Helen Betty Osborne Ininiw Education Resource Centre	Norway House	5	Norway House, Manitoba
Jack River School	Norway House	5	Norway House, Manitoba

== See also ==
- List of school districts in Manitoba
- Our People Will Be Healed, a 2017 documentary film about the Helen Betty Osborne Ininiw Education Resource Centre

== Sources and external links ==
Government of Manitoba - Education

Frontier School Division
