= Raft River (disambiguation) =

The Raft River is a river in Utah and Idaho in the United States

Raft River may also refer to:

- Raft River (British Columbia), a river in British Columbia, Canada
- Raft River (Washington), a river on the Olympic Peninsula
- Raft River Mountains, in Box Elder County, Utah
- Raft River Jr./Sr. High School, in Malta, Idaho
- Rat River Settlement, in the Rural Municipality of De Salaberry, Manitoba, Canada

== See also ==
- Raft (disambiguation)
- Rat River (disambiguation)
