= Cranberry Elementary School =

Cranberry Elementary School may refer to:

- Cranberry Elementary School (Sarasota County Public Schools)
- Cranberry Station Elementary School (Carroll County Public Schools)
- Cranberry Portage Elementary School (Frontier School Division)
- Cranberry Pines Elementary School
