= Raft (disambiguation) =

A raft is a flat floating structure for travel over water.

Raft may also refer to:

== Arts, entertainment, and media ==
- Raft (band), a French band
- Raft (album), a 2017 studio album by Mike Cooper
- Raft (novel), a science fiction novel by Stephen Baxter
- Raft (video game), a survival game developed by Redbeet Interactive and published by Axolot Games
- Raft (comics), a fictional prison in comic books published by Marvel
- The Raft (MCU), a fictional prison in Marvel Cinematic Universe
- "The Raft" (short story), a horror short story by Stephen King
- The Raft, a fictional refugee flotilla in Neal Stephenson's novel Snow Crash

== Computing and technology ==
- Raft (algorithm), a distributed consensus protocol
- RaftLib, the Raft library for parallel processing with iostreams and compute kernels

== Organizations ==
- Remote Area Firefighting Team (RAFT), firefighting specialists
- Resource Area for Teaching (RAFT), a nonprofit organization supplying materials and ideas to teachers

== Science ==
- RAFT (chemistry), reversible addition–fragmentation chain transfer
- Lipid raft, a cholesterol-enriched microdomain in cell membranes
- Raft spider, a European spider of the family Pisauridae

== Other uses ==
- Floating raft system, a type of design for the (underground) foundation of a building
- George Raft (1901–1980), American film actor
- Great Raft, a gigantic log jam in the Red River, Louisiana, U.S.
- Raft Island, a private island in Pierce County, Washington, U.S.
- Rafting, a recreational activity utilizing a raft
- Timber rafting, a method for transporting felled tree trunks

== See also ==
- Raft River (disambiguation)
