= Tyndall, Manitoba =

Tyndall
- Designated place
- Location of Tyndall in Manitoba
- Coordinates: 50.084°N 96.661°W
- Country: Canada
- Province: Manitoba
- Region: Eastman
- Rural municipality: Brokenhead
- Founded: 1893

Area
  - Land: 2.23 km^{2} (0.86 sq mi)

Population (2021)
  - Total: 1,001
- Time zone: UTC-6 (CST)
  - Summer (DST): UTC-5 (CDT)

Tyndall is a designated place within the Rural Municipality of Brokenhead in the Canadian province of Manitoba. It forms part of the Local Urban District of Tyndall-Garson.

== History ==
Tyndall was founded in 1893.

== Demographics ==
In the 2021 Census of Population conducted by Statistics Canada, Tyndall had a population of 1,001 living in 373 of its 393 total private dwellings, a change of 7.1% from its 2016 population of 935. With a land area of 2.23 km^{2} (0.86 sq mi), it had a population density of 448.9/km^{2} (1,162.6/sq mi) in 2021.

== Government ==
Tyndall is governed by the Rural Municipality of Brokenhead. As part of the Local Urban District of Tyndall-Garson, it is further governed by a committee of three elected officials that have a mandate to render decisions on maintenance of public infrastructure and enforcement of bylaws.

== See also ==
- List of communities in Manitoba
- List of designated places in Manitoba
