= Beaver Creek (Manitoba) =

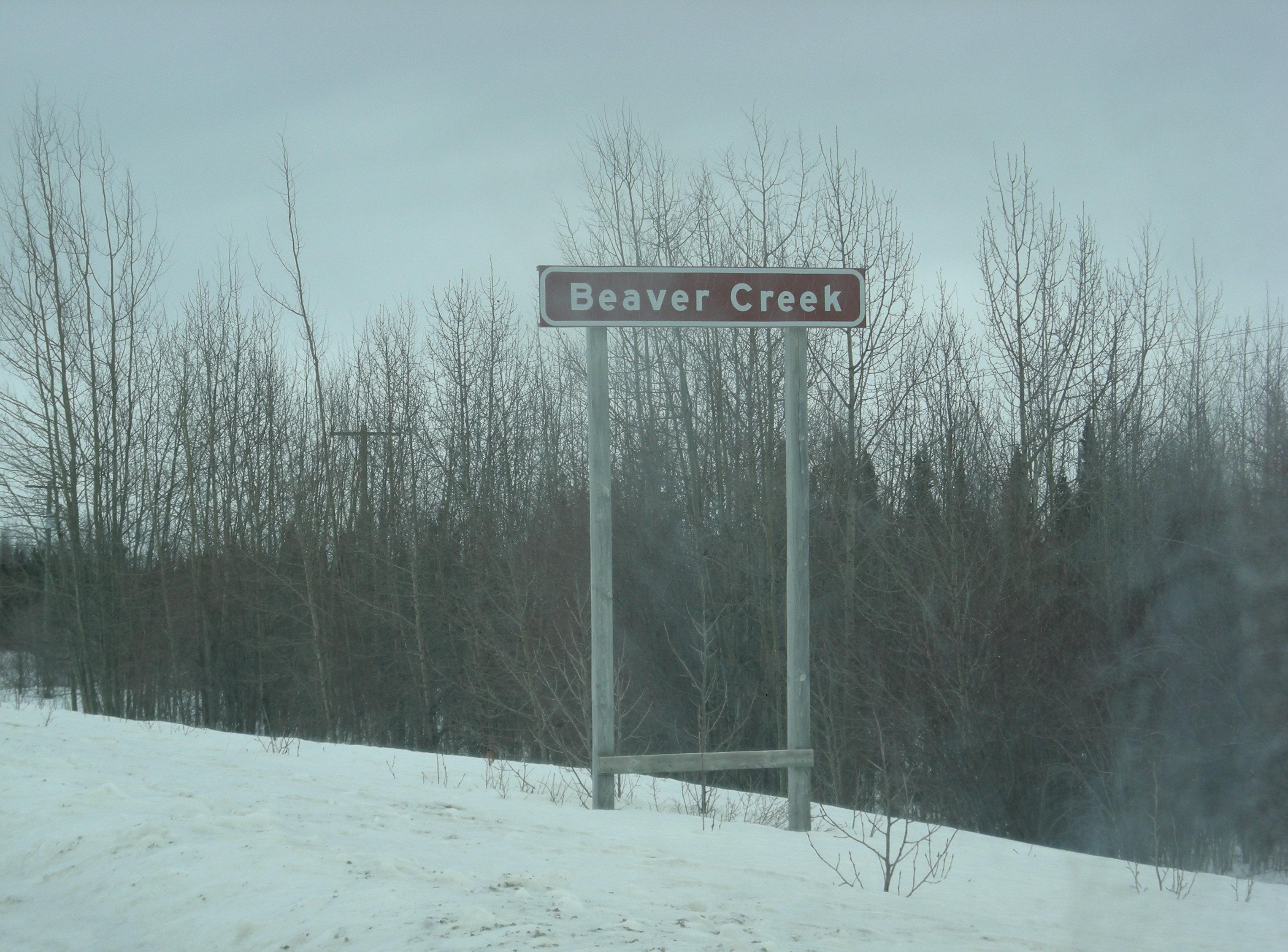
Road sign for one of the Beaver Creeks in Manitoba, Canada

Beaver Creek may refer to one of nine rivers in Manitoba, Canada:

- Beaver Creek, National Topographic System (NTS) map sheet 062J02
- Beaver Creek, NTS map sheet 062I01
- Beaver Creek, NTS map sheet 062K06
- Beaver Creek, NTS map sheet 062I16
- Beaver Creek, NTS map sheet 052M04
- Beaver Creek, NTS map sheet 063F10
- Beaver Creek, NTS map sheet 062P07
- Beaver Creek, NTS map sheet 063C14
- Beaver Creek, NTS map sheet 063C11

There is also an unincorporated place on Lake Winnipeg and Manitoba Provincial Road 234 called Beaver Creek; it is near the mouth of the Beaver Creek with CGNDB Unique Identifier GABZL. Beaver Creek Provincial Park is also nearby.

== See also ==
- List of rivers of Manitoba
