= Herman Finger =

American lumberman and mayor

Mayor of The Pas, Manitoba
- In office 1912–1916
- Preceded by: Town Established
- Succeeded by: John E. Rusk

Treasurer of Vilas County, Wisconsin
- In office 1894 – c. 1899

Personal details
- Born: 13 April 1856 Brookfield, Wisconsin
- Died: 26 November 1929 (aged 73) Winnipeg, Manitoba
- Spouse: Emma Elizabeth Finger
- Children: Orley H. Finger; Eva Finger; Oscar Finger; Viola Finger; Effie Grace Finger; Harold Finger
- Parent(s): Eva and Gottfried Finger
- Occupation: Lumberman

Herman Finger (1856-1929) was an American lumberman who owned and operated various lumber companies that operated in Wisconsin, Minnesota, Ontario, Manitoba, and Saskatchewan. He also served as the first mayor of The Pas after its establishment in 1912.

== Origins in the United States ==
Eva and Gottfried Finger immigrated to the United States from Germany and gave birth to Herman in Brookfield, Wisconsin on 13 April 1856. They lived near Milwaukee for seven years before moving to Outagamie County. Eva and Gottfried had ten children including Herman.

In 1878, Herman bought a farm in Waupaca County and some land in Northern Minnesota, and in 1881 he became the foreman of Sherry Lumber Company in Vesper, Wisconsin.

In 1886, he acquired a stake in Gerry Lumber Company near Eagle River, Wisconsin, and was put in-charge of running the company. In 1894, he became Treasurer of Vilas County while continuing to run the lumber company.

While living in Wisconsin, he and his wife Emma Elizabeth Finger gave birth to seven children.

== Pigeon River Lumber Company ==
Pigeon River Lumber Company
- Type: Private
- Industry: Forestry
- Founded: 1900
- Founder: Daniel J. Arpin; Herman Finger; William Scott
- Defunct: 1919
- Fate: Dissolved
- Headquarters: Port Arthur, Ontario

In 1900, Herman and his family, moved to Port Arthur, Ontario so that Herman could start his own lumber company called the Pigeon River Lumber Company along with Daniel J. Arpin and William Scott Jr. They initially purchased the Graham and Horne sawmill to process their timber, but by 1901, they finished building their own sawmill at Port Arthur, which was the largest in Western Canada. Pigeon River Lumber Company was the largest employer in the Canadian Lakehead region until 1911 when the Port Arthur Shipbuilding Company was created.

Many of the logs were shipped by train to the sawmills. The company owned its own railway called the Gunflint and Lake Superior Railroad, and also shipped logs and lumber on the Port Arthur, Duluth and Western Railway and the Canadian Northern Railway.

By 1906, only around 10-years-worth of the company's timber remained unharvested, so Finger purchased new timber berths throughout the Carrot River Valley in the District of Keewatin and the newly-formed Province of Saskatchewan. The Pigeon River Lumber Company eventually shut down in 1919.

== Finger Lumber Company ==
Finger Lumber Company
- Type: Private
- Industry: Forestry
- Founded: 1906
- Founder: Herman Finger
- Defunct: 1919
- Fate: Purchased
- Successor: The Pas Lumber Company
- Headquarters: Fingerville, Keewatin which later became The Pas, Manitoba

With these new Carrot River timber berths in-hand, Herman Finger established the Finger Lumber Company, and planned to build a sawmill, and a pulp and paper mill. He chose to build the mills near a Hudson's Bay Company Trading Post where the Carrot River flowed into the Saskatchewan River since the Saskatchewan River already had well-established trade routes, and because the Canadian Northern Railway planned to build a rail line through the area on their way to the Hudson Bay.

In 1900, the Canadian Northern Railway had reached Erwood, Saskatchewan with their northern line. However, instead of continuing their construction north towards the Hudson Bay, they continued building eastward towards Melfort to collect lumber from closer sawmills and also grain and other agricultural products from the prairies. By 1907, Finger and the Canadian Parliament convinced the railway to continue building north, and by 1910, a line was completed that connected the mill to Hudson Bay Junction, Saskatchewan.

Between 1906 and 1910, the company had acquired 194 square miles (500 km^{2}) of timber berths, and in October 1910, they began building their first mill. Finger also created a village near the mill where the employees could live, and named it Fingerville. Parts of the mill were steam-powered from boilers that burned waste wood, and other parts were powered by diesel generators, which also supplied electricity to Fingerville, and later to The Pas.

In 1912, the Town of The Pas was incorporated, and Herman Finger became its first mayor. Fingerville was absorbed into The Pas, and a train station was built for the town on the Canadian Northern Rail line.

The 1910s were the best years for the company due to a depletion of the forests of Wisconsin and Minnesota leading to increased lumber demand from the US. However in 1919, the company barn burned down, and one of Finger's old financial partners died, so he decided to sell the company to David Winton of Minneapolis, who changed the name of the company to The Pas Lumber Company.

== Legacy ==
Herman Finger retired in Winnipeg and died in his home at 353 Maplewood Avenue on November 26, 1929. His son Orley Finger also became a mayor of The Pas in 1919.
