= Rod Bushie =

Grand Chief of the Assembly of Manitoba Chiefs

Roderick William Bushie (December 19, 1952 – June 14, 2013) was a Canadian Anishinaabe elder who served as the Grand Chief of Assembly of Manitoba Chiefs, the largest First Nations organization in Manitoba, from 1997 to 2000.

Bushie served as the Chief of the Hollow Water First Nation, his home community, prior to his election as head of the Assembly of Manitoba Chiefs in 1997.

In August 1997, Bushie was elected Grand Chief of the Assembly of Manitoba Chiefs, serving until 2000. Bushie was one of the creators of devolution, which transferred child welfare services to First Nation and Métis authorities. In 2007, Bushie was defeated in an election to become head of the Southern Chiefs Organization.

Bushie was a founder of the Aboriginal Curling Bonspiel and sat of the boards of directors of several community organizations, including the Adam Beach Film Institute.

Rod Bushie died from lung cancer on June 14, 2013, at the age of 60. The current Grand Chief of the Assembly of Manitoba Chiefs, Derek Nepinak, released a statement, "On behalf of the Assembly of Manitoba Chiefs, I offer sincere condolences to his wife Eileen and children, along with the family and friends of Rod Bushie."
