= Garson, Manitoba =

Garson
- Designated place
- Location of Garson in Manitoba
- Coordinates: 50.077°N 96.704°W
- Country: Canada
- Province: Manitoba
- Region: Eastman
- Rural municipality: Brokenhead

Area
  - Land: 1.13 km^{2} (0.44 sq mi)

Population (2021)
  - Total: 748
- Time zone: UTC-6 (CST)
  - Summer (DST): UTC-5 (CDT)

Garson is a designated place within the Rural Municipality of Brokenhead in the Canadian province of Manitoba. Originally named Lyall, it held village status from 1915 to 2003. It now forms part of the Local Urban District of Tyndall-Garson.

== History ==
Garson originally incorporated as the Village of Lyall on January 1, 1915. Its official name was changed to Garson on April 9, 1927. It dissolved from village status on January 1, 2003 to become part of the Rural Municipality of Brokenhead.

== Demographics ==
In the 2021 Census of Population conducted by Statistics Canada, Garson had a population of 748 living in 279 of its 287 total private dwellings, a change of 15.6% from its 2016 population of 647. With a land area of 1.13 km^{2} (0.44 sq mi), it had a population density of 661.9/km^{2} (1,714.4/sq mi) in 2021.

== Government ==
Garson is governed by the Rural Municipality of Brokenhead. As part of the Local Urban District of Tyndall-Garson, it is further governed by a committee of three elected officials that have a mandate to render decisions on maintenance of public infrastructure and enforcement of bylaws.

== See also ==
- List of communities in Manitoba
- List of designated places in Manitoba
