= Red Deer Lumber Company =

- Company type: Private
- Industry: Forestry
- Founded: 1901
- Defunct: April 1926
- Fate: Purchased
- Successor: The Pas Lumber Company
- Headquarters: Winnipeg

The Red Deer Lumber Company was a forestry company that had approximately 10 logging operations along the Red Deer River, and owned and operated a sawmill on the south shore of Red Deer Lake.

The Red Deer Lake sawmill was one of Manitoba's three largest sawmills, with the other two being those at Grandview and The Pas.

== History ==
The company began operations in 1901, and was founded by the following people:

- Orlando A. Robertson, a real estate dealer from St. Paul, MN who invested $200,000
- Fredrick G. Barrows, a banker from Fergus Falls, MN who invested $100,000
- Fredrick B. Lynch, a real estate dealer from St. Paul, MN who invested $100,000
- Henry J. Box, a lumberman from Winnipeg, MB who invested $50,000
- William Henry Cross, a real estate dealer from Winnipeg, MB who invested $50,000

All five of the above became the first directors of the company, with Robertson being the President, and Lynch being the Secretary.

The initial investments were used to build a sawmill on the south shore of Red Deer Lake. From the sawmill, a rail spur was also built to connect the mill to the Canadian Northern Railway line to the south, which had been built to Erwood in 1900 from Swan River.

The company also created two settlements to serve the mill: the community of Red Deer Lake was built near the mill on the lakeshore, and the community of Barrows was built at the railway junction.

By 1907, a controlling interest in the company was owned by Union Lumber Company from Chicago.

The sawmill closed in 1926, and the company was then sold to The Pas Lumber Company, who received their permit to operate and restarted the Red Deer Lake Mill in 1928.

== Operations ==
Wood for the sawmill was cut along the Red Deer River, and the logs were floated down the river to the lake when they were caught and then processed in the mill. Logs were also floated down the Etomami, Little Swan, and North Armit Rivers, which all eventually flowed into the Red Deer River. In the late summer and fall, an emphasis was put on getting logs cut. In the winter, once a snowpack was established, horse-drawn sleighs could be used to transport the cut logs from the fall down to piles on the nearest riverbanks. In the early summer, once the ice cleared on the rivers, the logs would be set in the river and the log drive would begin.

Some of the logging areas had work camps where workers could live, and these camps could accommodate around 200 people per camp. Approximately 2000 people were employed by the company in total.

The company owned a steamboat for transporting workers around the lake, and up and down the river, and various other barges known as "wangans" or "wannigans." The wannigans had flat bottoms for navigating shallow rivers, and a house in the centre with a kitchen and storage.

Most of the lumber produced at Red Deer Lake was exported to the United States, but this practice stopped once the US closed their border to Canadian lumber, and this border closure was one of the factors that eventually led to the downfall of the company.
