= Hollow Water First Nation =

Anishinaabe band in Manitoba, Canada

- Band No. 263
- Wanipigow
- Treaty: Treaty 5
- Headquarters: Wanipigow, Manitoba

Land
- Main reserve: Hole or Hollow Water 10
- Land area: 16.229 km^{2} (6.266 sq mi)

Population (2019)
- On reserve: 1,072
- Off reserve: 964
- Total population: 2,036

Government
- Chief: Larry Barker
- Council: Furlon Barker; Wesley moneyas; Henry Moneas; Maurice Williams

Tribal Council
- Southeast Resource Development Council

Hollow Water First Nation (Ojibwe: Waanibiigaaw also spelt as Wanipigow) is an Anishinaabe (Ojibwa) First Nation located on the east side of Lake Winnipeg, Canada, 75 km (47 mi) north of Pine Falls, Manitoba, and 217 km (135 mi) north of Winnipeg.

The main economic base of the community remains hunting, fishing, trapping and wild rice harvesting.

== Hole or Hollow Water 10 ==
The First Nation has one reserve: Hole or Hollow Water 10 (51°10′5″N 96°16′59″W), which has a total size of 16.38 km^{2} (4,050 acres) and contains the community of Wanipigow (itself meaning 'hollow water' or 'hole in the water' in Cree). The reserve is adjacent to and bounded in the southwest by Seymourville, and across the river from Aghaming.

== Governance ==
Hollow Water First Nation is governed by the Act Electoral System of government. The current leadership, as of 2021, is Chief Larry Barker and four Councilors: Furlon Barker, Geoffrey Bushie, Henry Moneas, and Maurice Williams.

Hollow Water First Nation is a member of the Southeast Resource Development Council and a signatory to Treaty 5.

Former Chiefs of the Hollow Water First Nation include Rod Bushie, who was later elected Grand Chief of Assembly of Manitoba Chiefs in August 1997.
