= Pasquia =

Community in Manitoba, Canada

Coordinates: 53.7503°N 101.6361°W

Pasquia is a settlement in the province of Manitoba, Canada. It is located approximately 29 kilometres (18 mi) southwest of The Pas within the Rural Municipality of Kelsey. It is situated on the banks of the Carrot River and accessed from Highway 283.

== See also ==
- List of communities in Manitoba
