= The Pas Lumber Company =

- Company type: Private
- Industry: Forestry
- Predecessor: Finger Lumber Company; Red Deer Lumber Company
- Founded: 1919
- Founder: David Judson Winton (President); Charles Joel Winton; Charles Joel Winton Jr.
- Defunct: 2008; 18 years ago
- Fate: Shut down during the Great Recession
- Headquarters: The Pas, Manitoba; Minneapolis, Minnesota; Prince George, British Columbia

The Pas Lumber Company (later known as Winton Global Lumber) was a forestry company that owned and operated several sawmills and logging operations in Manitoba, Saskatchewan, and British Columbia.

== United States origins ==
Charles Joel Winton was born in Chicago, Illinois, in 1862. His family later moved to Addison, New York, and he went to Princeton University, before moving to Wausau, Wisconsin, in 1884. Once in Wausau, he invested money into various sectors such as land, rail, and oil, and in 1889, he began investing in forestry. In 1897, he and his wife Helen Smith Winton gave birth to David Judson Winton, and in 1899, they gave birth to Charles Joel Winton, Jr. The family moved to Minneapolis in 1909.

After graduation, David Judson Winton also studied at Princeton University. His studies were interrupted by World War I, and before entering his final year of studies, he spent two years in the US Army with the American Field Service Ambulance Corps. He was deployed to France, where he was injured, and received the Distinguished Service Cross and the Purple Heart. After graduating from Princeton in 1920 he worked in logging camps before eventually moving back to Minneapolis. Once there he worked with his father Charles and his brother Charles Jr. at the Winton Companies, and eventually took over as the head of the Winton Companies.

By the 1910s, forests in Wisconsin and Minnesota were running out of wood, and many of the lumbermen began moving to Canada to find new forests to harvest. In 1919, the Finger Lumber Company in The Pas, Manitoba, suffered a barn fire at their sawmill, and David Judson Winton used this event as an opportunity to buy-out the company and shift his lumber operations to Canada.

== Canadian operations ==
The assets acquired from the Finger Lumber Company included the mill facilities in The Pas, one tugboat, two steam barges, and 324 square miles (840 km^{2}) of timber berths along the Carrot and Saskatchewan Rivers. The Wintons had also recently purchased a sawmill in Prince Albert, Saskatchewan, and decided to move the machinery from it to their larger operation in The Pas, which was renamed to The Pas Lumber Company.

Throughout the 1920s, the company continued upgrading their facilities in The Pas and acquiring new timber berths. Within their first ten years of operating, they doubled their shipping capacity to four steamboats. So much wood was cut along the Carrot River that the river became impassable for ships in the springtime, and the company had to build roads along the river as an alternative mode of travel.

In 1926, The Pas Lumber Company purchased the Red Deer Lumber Company, and began operating their sawmill on Red Deer Lake in 1928.

Around this time, the Canadian Northern Railway (CNoR) began building another rail line south from Hudson Bay Junction. Since much of the wood for their Red Deer Lake Sawmill had been cut upstream along the Etomami River, the company decided to build a new sawmill and a dam on the Etomami River at the base of the Porcupine Hills within the Porcupine Forest Reserve near to the new rail line. CNoR eventually built another rail line to this area from Crooked River, Saskatchewan. Therefore, the community that grew around the new mill was called Reserve Junction, because it was the only railway junction within the Porcupine Forest Reserve. Once the new mill at Reserve Junction was operational, the company shut down its mill at Red Deer Lake.

The Pas Lumber Company continued to operate its mill at Reserve Junction until 1954, when the company opened a new mill in Prince George, BC. By 1958, its mill in The Pas had also closed so the company could focus its efforts in BC.

== Sinclar Group and closure ==
Winton Global Lumber's BC operations were sold to Sinclar Group (2/3 ownership) and Canfor (1/3 ownership) in 1987. Sinclar Enterprises started in 1962 as a lumber wholesaler, named after the small town of Sinclair Mills.

In 1996, Sinclar unveiled the "Winton Homes & Cottages" trademark, which as of 2023 is still active in Canada.

Even though the company no longer had operations in The Pas, they continued to call themselves The Pas Lumber Company for several decades after the 1958 closure, but eventually renamed the company to Winton Global Lumber in 2004.

Sinclar continued to operate Winton Global Lumber until June 2008 when new home construction in the US severely dropped after the end of the 2000s United States housing bubble. Production was put on hiatus until 2011, when the decision was made to permanently close the Winton Global Lumber plant sites, citing demand as still below half pre-bubble levels.

Sinclar Enterprises was renamed Sinclar Group Forest Products in 2009.

== Legacy ==
Sinclar Group Forest Products Engineered Wood and Prefabricated Home Divisions still use the Winton name.
