= Oak Island (Manitoba) =

Settlement in Manitoba, Canada

Coordinates: 49.6833°N 96.9292°W

Oak Island is a settlement in the province of Manitoba, Canada. It is located approximately 27 km (17 mi) southeast of downtown Winnipeg within the Rural Municipality of Taché.
