= Westgate, Manitoba =

Unincorporated community in Manitoba, Canada

Coordinates: 52.8297°N 101.655°W

Westgate is an unincorporated community in northern Manitoba, Canada. It is located approximately 210 kilometres (130 mi) south of Flin Flon near Manitoba's boundary with Saskatchewan.

Westgate was originally settled as a logging community along the railroad line. At one point, the population was estimated to be as high as 110 people. A local mill produced lumber, fence posts and building timbers from 1940 up to 1975. The large mill is shut down but a smaller version is still operable, maintained by a local.

== See also ==
- List of communities in Manitoba
