= National Mills =

- Community boundaries

- Location in Manitoba
- Coordinates: 52.824°N 101.584°W
- Country: Canada
- Province: Manitoba
- Region: Northern Manitoba

National Mills is a community in the Canadian province of Manitoba. It is part of a group of five communities in the region, all built to serve logging operations in the Porcupine Provincial Forest. The others are Powell, Baden, Red Deer Lake, and the largest, Barrows, where the nearest school and fire service are located. The community contains four housing units.

== Demographics ==
In the 2021 Census of Population conducted by Statistics Canada, National Mills had a population of 0 living in 0 of its 0 total private dwellings, a change of nan% from its 2016 population of . With a land area of 2.62 km^{2} (1.01 sq mi), it had a population density of 0.0/km^{2} (0.0/sq mi) in 2021.
