= Long Body Creek, Manitoba =

Coordinates: 51.7661°N 96.6469°W

Long Body Creek is an unincorporated community in northern Manitoba, Canada. It is located approximately 210 km (130 mi) north of Winnipeg on the east shore of Lake Winnipeg.
