= Baden, Manitoba =

Baden
- Community boundaries

- Location in Manitoba
- Coordinates: 52.781°N 101.218°W
- Country: Canada
- Province: Manitoba
- Region: Northern Manitoba

Baden is a northern community in the Canadian province of Manitoba. It is part of a group of five communities in the region, all built to serve logging operations in the Porcupine Provincial Forest. The others are National Mills, Powell, Red Deer Lake, and the largest, Barrows, where the nearest school and fire service are located. The community contains 15 housing units.

It was named by the Canadian National Railway after Sir Robert Baden-Powell, a British General.

== Demographics ==
In the 2021 Census of Population conducted by Statistics Canada, Baden had a population of 10 living in 5 of its 8 total private dwellings, a change of −41.2% from its 2016 population of 17. With a land area of 0.67 km^{2} (0.26 sq mi), it had a population density of 14.9/km^{2} (38.7/sq mi) in 2021.
