= Beaver Creek Provincial Park (Manitoba) =

Provincial park in Manitoba, Canada

- Location within Manitoba
- Interactive map of Beaver Creek Provincial Park
- Location: North Interlake Region, Manitoba
- Coordinates: 51°22′35″N 96°54′56″W
- Elevation: 219 m (719 ft)
- Website: www.travelmanitoba.com/listings/beaver-creek-provincial-park/6643/

Beaver Creek Provincial Park is a provincial park on Lake Winnipeg near the mouth of Beaver Creek in the North Interlake Region of Manitoba, Canada.

The area was developed for recreational use by the province in the mid-1950s.

== Geography ==
Located on the west shore of Washow Bay on Lake Winnipeg, Beaver Creek Provincial Park encompasses a 2 km (1.2 mi) long stretch of land in the North Interlake Region, bordered by Provincial Road 234 in the west, and Lake Winnipeg in the east.

It is the most northerly provincial campground on Lake Winnipeg.

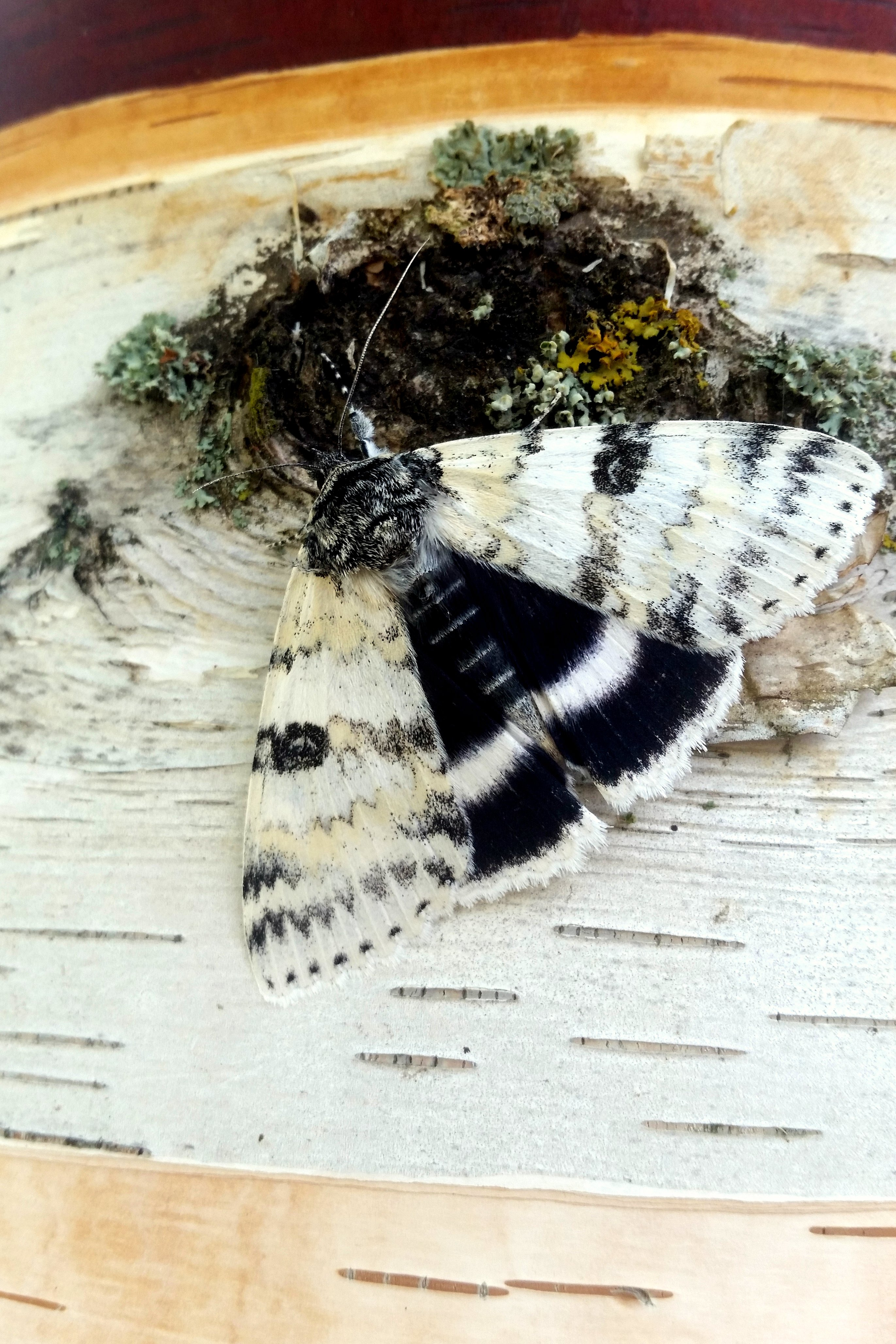
A moth on a birch tree in Beaver Creek Provincial Park.

== See also ==
- List of protected areas of Manitoba
