= Powell, Manitoba =

Powell
- Location in Manitoba
- Coordinates: 52.828°N 101.397°W
- Country: Canada
- Province: Manitoba
- Region: Northern Manitoba

Powell is a community in the Canadian province of Manitoba. It is part of a group of five communities in the region, all built to serve logging operations in the Porcupine Provincial Forest. The others are National Mills, Baden, Red Deer Lake, and the largest, Barrows, where the nearest school and fire service are located. The community contains eight housing units.

== Demographics ==
In the 2021 Census of Population conducted by Statistics Canada, Powell had a population of 15 living in 10 of its 11 total private dwellings, a change of 0% from its 2016 population of 15. With a land area of 1.19 km^{2} (0.46 sq mi), it had a population density of 12.6/km^{2} (32.6/sq mi) in 2021.
