= Resource Area for Teaching =

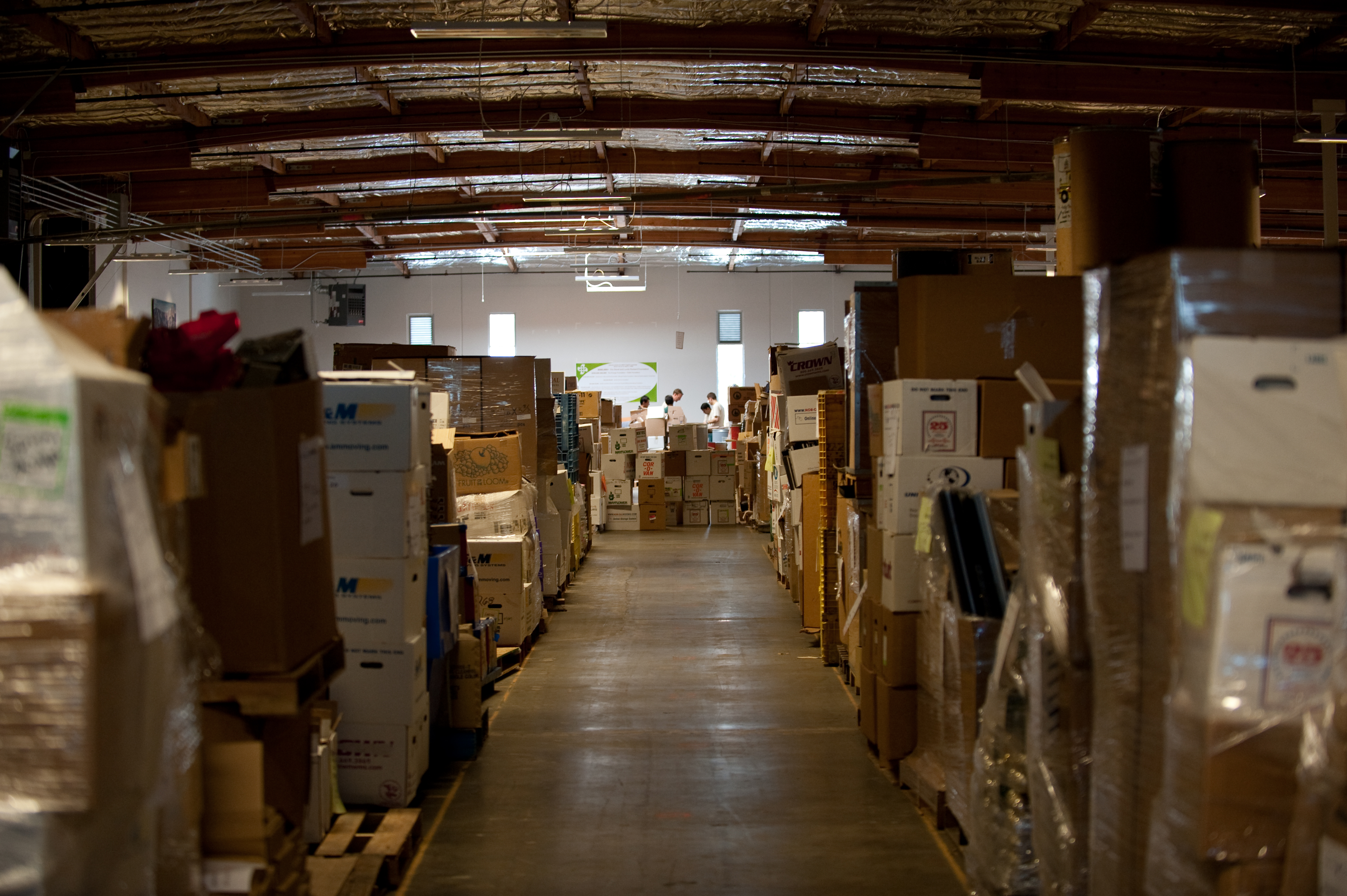
The RAFT Sobrato Center warehouse, located in Sunnyvale, California.

Resource Area For Teaching (RAFT) is a nonprofit (501c3) that is pursuing an alternative approach to education. It has been the subject of studies from the Stanford University School of Business, KPMG and Deloitte. It partners with the San Francisco Exploratorium in developing hands-on demonstrations and activities. While the Exploratorium tends to focus on Science-related activities, RAFT keeps its focus on classroom pursuits of a wider subject area, including Science, Mathematics, Art, and Literature.

RAFT has three principal social and pedagogical themes:

- Many children learn best through the exercise of tactile and kinesthetic senses that are seldom exploited in traditional classroom settings with their emphasis on auditory and visual learning.
- Almost all educational institutions in the U.S. have insufficient government funding for materials for the classroom (known as manipulatives), funding for which is often provided by the teacher at his or her own expense.
- Materials for classroom learning are often available in industrial and commercial discards, overruns, and restocks, which businesses will gladly re-purpose to aid education.

RAFT has retail locations in San Jose, Redwood City and Sacramento, California as well as Denver, Colorado and serves 10,000 teacher members at the four sites.. It also operates a warehouse and volunteer center in Sunnyvale, California. The organization operates on a $4 million annual budget, which is used to operate programs and subsidize material purchases and teacher-training workshops. Funding is provided by a mix of foundation, corporate and personal donations.

In 2012, the organization launched an eCommerce website where teacher classroom kits may be purchased online.

In 2013, a joint venture with Scholastic began distribution of RAFT-designed kits through the retail stores that carry Scholastic products.

The operation includes several divisions:

- Logistics is responsible for material acquisition, warehousing and sorting. Most material donations arrive without solicitation, and are picked up by RAFT trucks or delivered to one of the sites. Material sorting is a labor-intensive activity staffed almost entirely by corporate and individual volunteers.
- The Education Department is responsible for developing classroom activities that make use of the available materials. This group consists of professional educators who:
  - Schedule and staff workshops,
  - Create Idea Sheets posted on the RAFT web site, and
  - Design classroom kits (assembled by volunteers) for state-standard aligned activities.
- Member Services ensures that RAFT identifies its clients as legitimate educators and non-profit employees and volunteers, provides information on programs to this group, and reaches out to the wider education community.

== Founding ==
RAFT was founded in 1994 by Mary F. Simon
