= Big Eddy, Manitoba =

Coordinates: 53.8589°N 101.3256°W

Big Eddy is a settlement in the province of Manitoba, Canada. It is located 7 km (4.3 mi) west of The Pas within the Rural Municipality of Kelsey.
