= Tappern House =

Coordinates: 51°26′32.02″N 0°4′55.92″W

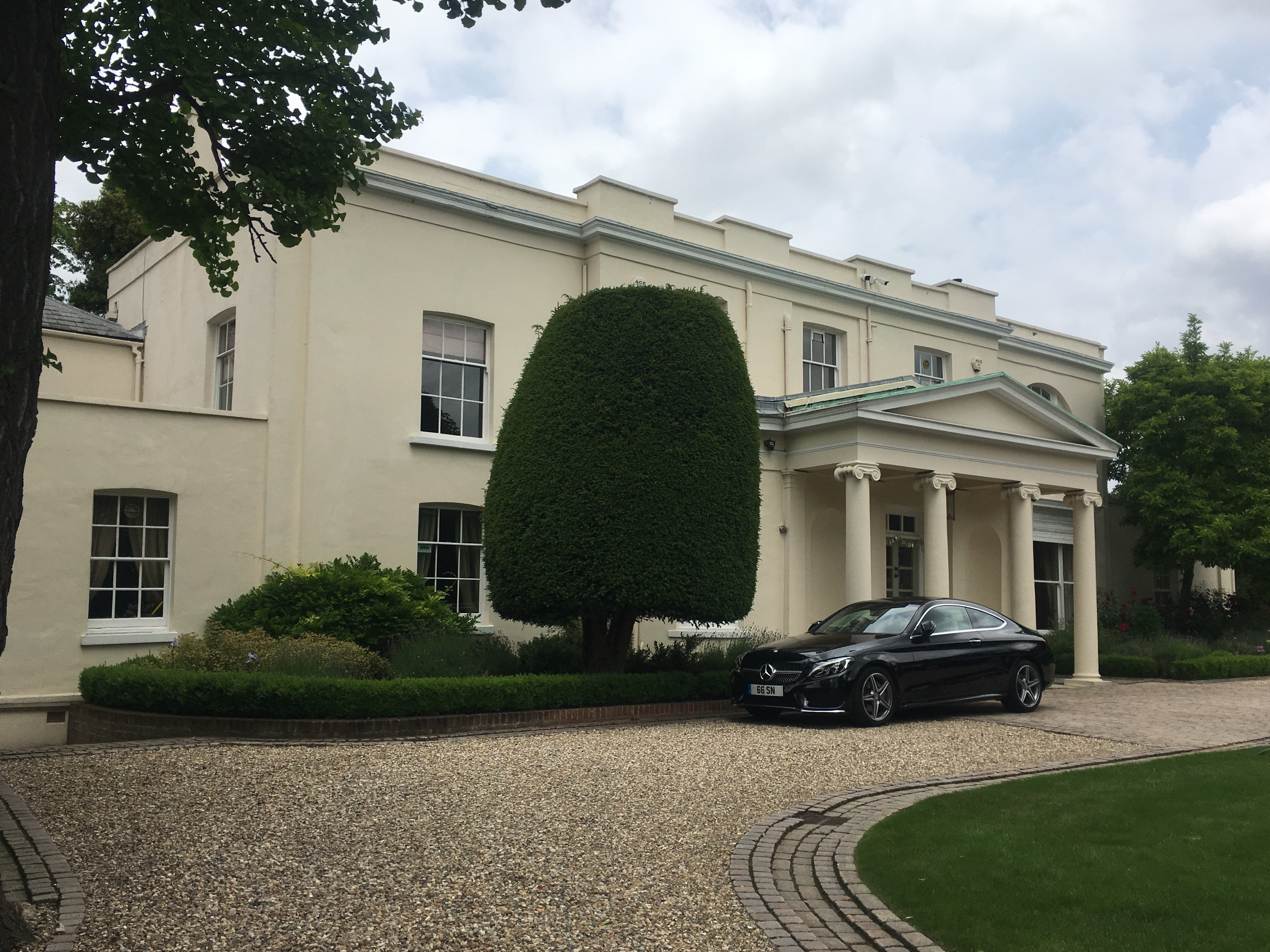
Glenlea in June 2018

Tappen House (formerly known as Glenlea) on Dulwich Common Road, in Dulwich in Southwark, south east London, is a detached house that was designed by George Tappen, the surveyor of Dulwich College. It has been Grade II listed on the National Heritage List for England since September 1972.

Bridget Cherry, writing in the 1991 London: South edition of the Pevsner Architectural Guides, described Glenlea as a "pretty stuccoed villa".
