= Big Black River, Manitoba =

Coordinates: 53.1628°N 97.4222°W

Big Black River is an unincorporated community in the northern region of Manitoba, Canada. It is located approximately 365 km (227 mi) north of Winnipeg on the east shore of Lake Winnipeg.
