= Poplarville, Manitoba =

Coordinates: 52.9883°N 97.2339°W

Poplarville is an unincorporated community in northern Manitoba, Canada. It is located approximately 340 km (210 mi) north of Winnipeg adjacent to Poplar River Indian Reserve No. 16 on the east shore of Lake Winnipeg.
