= Aghaming, Manitoba =

Coordinates: 51.188°N 96.288°W

Aghaming is a community in the Canadian province of Manitoba.

The community is on the Wanipigow River near the point where it flows into Lake Winnipeg. Across the river is the Hollow Water First Nation. It is administered under the Northern Affairs Act of Manitoba.

== Demographics ==
In the 2021 Census of Population conducted by Statistics Canada, Aghaming had a population of 10 living in 6 of its 7 total private dwellings, a change of -33.3% from its 2016 population of 15. With a land area of 3.16 km^{2} (1.22 sq mi), it had a population density of 3.2/km^{2} (8.2/sq mi) in 2021.
