= Loon Straits, Manitoba =

Coordinates: 51.525°N 96.585°W

Loon Straits is a community in the Canadian province of Manitoba. A designated place in Canadian census data, the community had a population of 16 in the Canada 2006 Census.

The community had been settled by largely Metis settlers of mixed Cree/ Ojibway (Or Saulteaux as it was known in the past)/Irish/Scottish heritage.

== Demographics ==
In the 2021 Census of Population conducted by Statistics Canada, Loon Straits had a population of 5 living in 5 of its 35 total private dwellings, a change of -50% from its 2016 population of 10. With a land area of 2.31 km^{2} (0.89 sq mi), it had a population density of 2.2/km^{2} (5.6/sq mi) in 2021.
