= Salt Point, Manitoba =

Coordinates: 51.753°N 99.814°W

Salt Point is a community in the Canadian province of Manitoba.

== Demographics ==
In the 2021 Census of Population conducted by Statistics Canada, Salt Point had a population of 10 living in 3 of its 5 total private dwellings, a change of 100% from its 2016 population of 5. With a land area of 30.22 km^{2} (11.67 sq mi), it had a population density of 0.3/km^{2} (0.9/sq mi) in 2021.
