= Harwill, Manitoba =

Canadian community

Coordinates: 51.294°N 97.685°W

Harwill is a community in the Canadian province of Manitoba.

== Demographics ==
In the 2021 Census of Population conducted by Statistics Canada, Harwill had a population of 15 living in 6 of its 8 total private dwellings, a change of -21.1% from its 2016 population of 19. With a land area of 259.6 km^{2} (100.2 sq mi), it had a population density of 0.1/km^{2} (0.1/sq mi) in 2021.
