= Dawson Bay, Manitoba =

Community in Manitoba, Canada

Coordinates: 52.975°N 100.978°W

Dawson Bay is a community in the Canadian province of Manitoba.

Dawson Bay is situated near the western shore of Lake Winnipegosis on Dawson Bay. It is near Mafeking, Manitoba and serviced by PTH #10. The community is administered under the Northern Affairs Act by a mayor and council .

== Demographics ==
In the 2021 Census of Population conducted by Statistics Canada, Dawson Bay had a population of 31 living in 14 of its 18 total private dwellings, a change of 47.6% from its 2016 population of 21. With a land area of 1.72 km^{2} (0.66 sq mi), it had a population density of 18.0/km^{2} (46.7/sq mi) in 2021.
