= Rat River Settlement =

Coordinates: 49.456°N 97.009°W

Rat River Settlement is an informal area within the Rural Municipality of De Salaberry in the province of Manitoba, Canada located east and south of the community of Otterburne, north and south of the village of St-Pierre-Jolys and northeast and southeast of the CP Emerson subdivision's former Carey rail siding.

== Bibliography ==
- Parks Canada (2008). "Manitoba History: Commemorating the First Railway in Western Canada". Manitoba Historical Society.
- Jolys, Father Jean-Marie (Saint-Pierre parish pastor) (1914). Pages de souvenirs et d'histoire - La paroisse de Saint-Pierre-Jolys au Manitoba. pp. 49–52.
- Ledohowski (pdf 3), E.M. (2003). "The Heritage Landscape of the Crow Wing Study Region of Southeastern Manitoba - Settlement Groups" (PDF).
- mapcarta.com (online). "Rat River Settlement".
- stpierrejolys.com (online). "The Story Behind St-Pierre-Jolys' Name".
