= Red Deer Lake (Manitoba) =

Lake in Manitoba, Canada

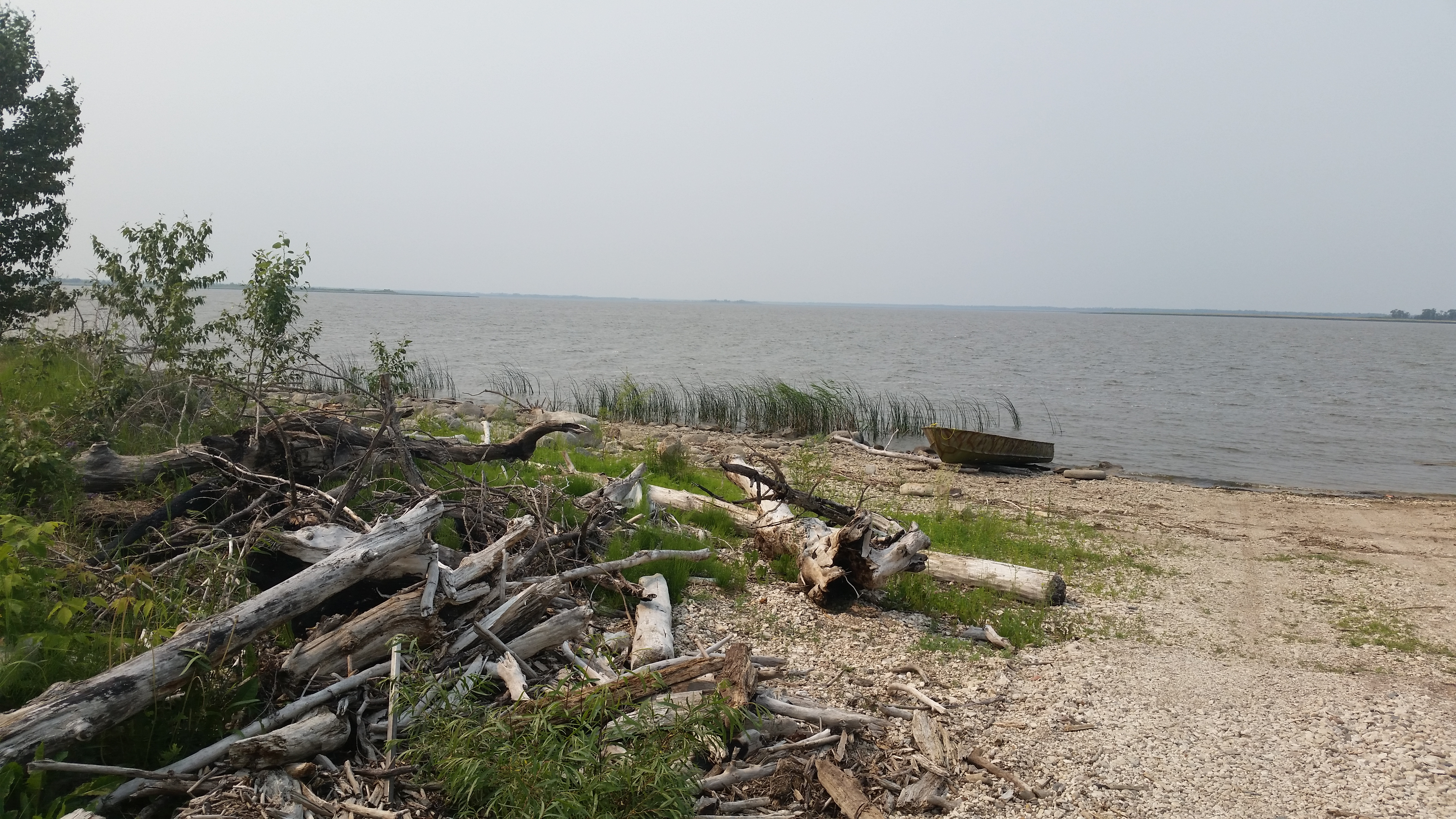
- Photo taken on the south shore of the lake at Red Deer Lake, Manitoba

- Location of the lake in Manitoba Red Deer Lake (Canada)
- Location: Western Manitoba
- Coordinates: 52°57′N 101°22′W
- Primary inflows: Red Deer River
- Primary outflows: Red Deer River
- Basin countries: Canada
- Surface elevation: 860 feet (260 m)
- Settlements: Red Deer Lake

Red Deer Lake is a lake located in the west-central region of the Canadian province of Manitoba. The lake's primary inflow and outflow is the Red Deer River. It is situated approximately 8 kilometres (5.0 mi) north of Barrows and 16 kilometres (9.9 mi) west of Dawson Bay, which is part of the larger Lake Winnipegosis. The lake lies about 13 kilometres (8.1 mi) east of the Saskatchewan border.

Geographically, Red Deer Lake is almost entirely within the northwest corner of Manitoba's Census Division No. 19, with its northernmost parts extending into the southwest corner of Division No. 21. In addition to the Red Deer River, the lake is fed by several smaller rivers and creeks, including the Grassy River, Armit River, Little Woody River, Wilson Creek, Homestead Creek, North Shore Creek, and Lost River. The lake's shoreline features several named bays, such as Grassy Bay, Armit River Bay, Ellis Bay, Woody Bay, Long Point Bay, and Lost River Bay. The lake does not have any notable islands.

== History ==
The area around Red Deer Lake played a significant role in the local lumber industry. In 1901, the Red Deer Lumber Company opened a sawmill on the south shore of the lake and built a rail spur to connect the mill to the Canadian Northern Railway line to the south. To support the mill operations, the company developed two settlements: the community of Red Deer Lake near the mill on the lakeshore, and Barrows at the railway junction. The sawmill operated until 1926, after which the area continued to be a hub for other logging companies and smaller sawmills.

== Industry ==
Today, the area around Red Deer Lake remains heavily forested. Fishing is a common activity, with fisheries in the lake and nearby Dawson Bay processing the catch from Red Deer Lake. Additionally, the region is known for coal exploration, particularly targeting the Mannville Formation, which adds another layer of economic activity to the area.

== See also ==
- List of lakes of Manitoba
- Assiniboine River fur trade
- Fort Red Deer River
- Hudson Bay drainage basin
