= Herb Lake Landing, Manitoba =

Coordinates: 54.656°N 99.788°W

Herb Lake Landing is a community in the Canadian province of Manitoba.

== Demographics ==
In the 2021 Census of Population conducted by Statistics Canada, Herb Lake Landing had a population of 16 living in 8 of its 16 total private dwellings, a change of 60% from its 2016 population of 10. With a land area of 7.49 km^{2} (2.89 sq mi), it had a population density of 2.1/km^{2} (5.5/sq mi) in 2021.
