= Homebrook, Manitoba =

Coordinates: 51.740°N 98.872°W

Homebrook is a community in the Canadian province of Manitoba.

== Demographics ==
In the 2021 Census of Population conducted by Statistics Canada, Homebrook - Peonan Point had a population of 26 living in 13 of its 13 total private dwellings, a change of -33.3% from its 2016 population of 39. With a land area of 361.28 km^{2} (139.49 sq mi), it had a population density of 0.1/km^{2} (0.2/sq mi) in 2021.
