= Rock Ridge, Manitoba =

Coordinates: 51.920°N 99.576°W

Rock Ridge is a community in the Canadian province of Manitoba.

== Demographics ==
In the 2021 Census of Population conducted by Statistics Canada, Rock Ridge had a population of 64 living in 15 of its 16 total private dwellings, a change of -12.3% from its 2016 population of 73. With a land area of 0.88 km^{2} (0.34 sq mi), it had a population density of 72.7/km^{2} (188.4/sq mi) in 2021.
