= Mallard, Manitoba =

Coordinates: 51.949°N 99.557°W

Mallard is a community in the Canadian province of Manitoba.

== Demographics ==
In the 2021 Census of Population conducted by Statistics Canada, Mallard had a population of 102 living in 30 of its 41 total private dwellings, a change of 30.8% from its 2016 population of 78. With a land area of 11.21 km^{2} (4.33 sq mi), it had a population density of 9.1/km^{2} (23.6/sq mi) in 2021.

== Notable people ==
Brigette Lacquette is the first First Nations woman to play hockey for Team Canada at the Winter Olympics in 2018. She is from Mallard, Manitoba.
