= Little Bullhead, Manitoba =

Coordinates: 51.6417°N 96.8056°W

Little Bullhead is an unincorporated community in northern Manitoba, Canada. It is located approximately 195 km (121 mi) north of Winnipeg on the west shore of Lake Winnipeg.
