= Matheson Island, Manitoba =

Matheson Island
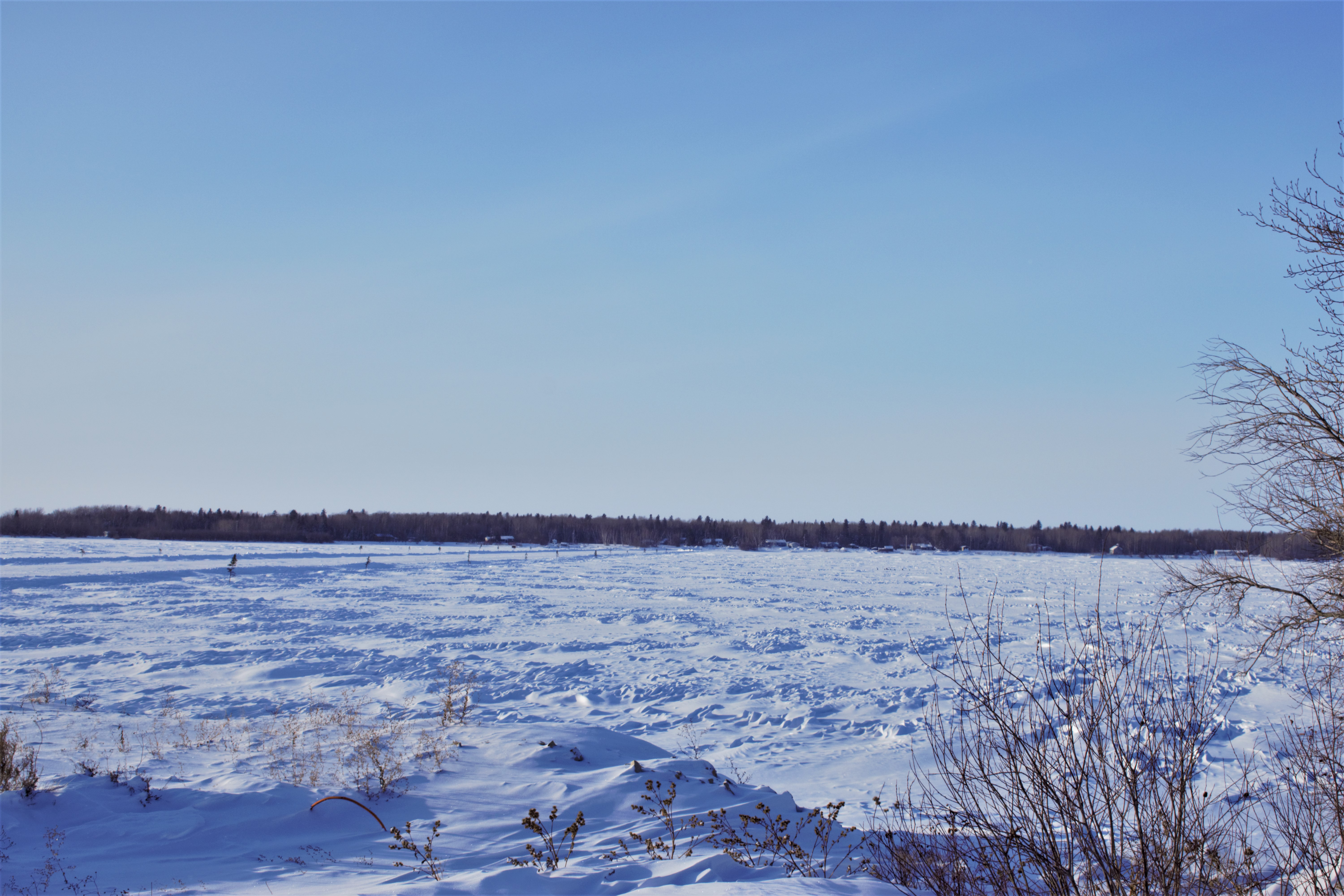
- A view of Matheson Island and the ice road to the community in winter.
- Nickname: Snake Island

- Location of Matheson Island in Manitoba
- Coordinates: 51°44′25″N 96°55′27″W
- Country: Canada
- Province: Manitoba
- Region: Interlake

Government
  - MP (Churchill—Keewatinook Aski): Rebecca Chartrand (Liberal)
  - MLA (The Pas-Kameesak): Jennifer Flett
  - Mayor: Wanda Mowatt

Area
  - Total: 21.34 km^{2} (8.24 sq mi)
- Elevation: 220 m (720 ft)

Population (2021)
  - Total: 136
  - Density: 4.7/km^{2} (12/sq mi)
- Time zone: UTC-6 (CST)
  - Summer (DST): UTC-5 (CDT)
- Postal code span: R0C 0B9
- Area code: 204

Matheson Island is a community and an island located in the Canadian province of Manitoba, at the narrows of Lake Winnipeg. A designated place in Canadian census data, the community had a population of 136 in the 2021 Canadian census. Commercial fishing is the number one source of income for the community and area, the Matheson Island Marketing Co-Op works with approximately 110 local fishers.

== Etymology ==
In the early days of the settlement of Manitoba, the island was known as Snake Island, as the locals had noted a high amount of garter snakes present on the shale island. It appears that eventually the snakes were killed off by the residents of Matheson Island. The island and community were then called Matheson Island, after Daniel Matheson, the man who was the caretaker of the lighthouse from 1891 to 1918 on Black Bear Island, which is just north east of the island. The Matheson family was originally from Aultbreakachy, Sutherland, Scotland. Daniel Matheson's grandfather arrived in Churchill, Manitoba in 1813, before traveling the next 700 miles to the Red River Settlement by canoe.

== Demographics ==
In the 2021 Census of Population conducted by Statistics Canada, Matheson Island had a population of 136 living in 52 of its 93 total private dwellings, a change of 34.7% from its 2016 population of 101. With a land area of 22.16 km^{2} (8.56 sq mi), it had a population density of 6.1/km^{2} (15.9/sq mi) in 2021.

== Infrastructure ==
The community on the island is served by the cable ferry C.F. Ingemar Carlson II in the summer. Once the ice is thick enough, an ice road as an extension of Provincial Road 234, provides access for the community in winter. As island community, Matheson Island has long had a natural harbour, with small docks, or with locals pulling their boats ashore. In 1990 the Matheson Island Harbour Authority (MIHA) signed a lease for the harbour at Matheson Island as well as at Matheson Island Landing, with the latter being located close to Pine Dock, Manitoba. At Matheson Island, this was now a harbour without an effective harbour. In the decade following their formation in 1990, the MIHA helped build a main harbour with a Breakwater and modern floating docks, which improved the accessibility and usability of the harbour. The modernized new harbour now serves the local community, several hundred local fishermen, recreational boaters and yachters, as well as large fish transport vessels.

Matheson Island School, which is part of the Frontier School Division, serves to educate the community's children. There are a total of 18 students that attend from nursery to grade 9 and are instructed by a total of two teachers and three support staff.
