= Pikwitonei =

Coordinates: 55°35′16″N 97°09′20″W

Pikwitonei is a community in Northern Region of Manitoba, Canada. It is located approximately 47 km (29.2 mi) from Thompson. The community is served by Via Rail at the Pikwitonei railway station.

== Demographics ==
In the 2021 Census of Population conducted by Statistics Canada, Pikwitonei had a population of 55 living in 20 of its 37 total private dwellings, a change of −14.1% from its 2016 population of 64. With a land area of 7.94 km^{2} (3.07 sq mi), it had a population density of 6.9/km^{2} (17.9/sq mi) in 2021.

== Transportation ==
A railway connected Piwitonei in 1914, and served as a division point until 1972. The flag stop that served the community is now served by Via Rail's Winnipeg–Churchill train.
