= Spence Lake, Manitoba =

Coordinates: 51.580°N 99.573°W

Spence Lake is a community in the Canadian province of Manitoba. It is located south of Meadow Portage and was named for a local rancher, John Baptiste Spence. Grandfather John Baptiste Spence lived and died in the early 1900's in Meadow Portage. His daughter is named Delma.

== Demographics ==
In the 2021 Census of Population conducted by Statistics Canada, Spence Lake had a population of 70 living in 39 of its 85 total private dwellings, a change of 32.1% from its 2016 population of 53. With a land area of 29.13 km^{2} (11.25 sq mi), it had a population density of 2.4/km^{2} (6.2/sq mi) in 2021.
