= Seymourville, Manitoba =

Coordinates: 51.183°N 96.328°W

Seymourville is a community in the Canadian province of Manitoba.

== Demographics ==
In the 2021 Census of Population conducted by Statistics Canada, Seymourville had a population of 76 living in 26 of its 40 total private dwellings, a change of -20% from its 2016 population of 95. With a land area of 23.14 km^{2} (8.93 sq mi), it had a population density of 3.3/km^{2} (8.5/sq mi) in 2021.
