= Red Deer Lake, Manitoba =

Coordinates: 52.894°N 101.464°W

Red Deer Lake is a community in the Canadian province of Manitoba. A designated place in Canadian census data, the community had a population of 25 in the Canada 2006 Census.

Most municipal services are provided by Barrows such as water treatment and firefighting. The closest school is the Mountain View School in Barrows.

== History ==
The community of Red Deer Lake was established by the Red Deer Lumber Company to house workers for their sawmill. The mill and the community were located on the south shore of Red Deer Lake, and were connected by rail to another Red Deer Lumber settlement known as Barrows.

The sawmill closed in 1926, and was purchased by The Pas Lumber Company. Much of the mill equipment was taken to mills around The Pas to be reused, and the rest of the mill site was salvaged for scrap metal during World War II.

Even after the mill closed, people stayed and lived in the houses left behind by the company. Today, Red Deer Lake is a Métis community with an economy focused on trapping and fishing.

== Demographics ==
In the 2021 Census of Population conducted by Statistics Canada, Red Deer Lake had a population of 20 living in 10 of its 13 total private dwellings, a change of 100% from its 2016 population of 10. With a land area of 6.61 km^{2} (2.55 sq mi), it had a population density of 3.0/km^{2} (7.8/sq mi) in 2021.
