= Princess Harbour, Manitoba =

Princess Harbour
- Nickname: Rabbit Point
- Location of Matheson Island in Manitoba
- Coordinates: 51°51′34″N 96°52′27″W
- Country: Canada
- Province: Manitoba
- Region: Interlake
- Settled: 1890
- Recognized by Manitoba: 1972

Government
  - MP (Churchill—Keewatinook Aski): Niki Ashton (NDP)
  - MLA (Keewatinook): Ian Bushie (NDP)

Area
  - Total: 2.19 km^{2} (0.85 sq mi)
- Elevation: 220 m (720 ft)

Population (2011)
  - Total: 10
- Time zone: UTC−6 (CST)
  - Summer (DST): UTC−5 (CDT)
- Postal code span: R0C 2P0
- Area code: 204

Princess Harbour is a community in the Canadian province of Manitoba. The village is on a small peninsula on the east shore of Lake Winnipeg. The community was originally named Rabbit Point and is still referred to as such by locals. Recognized as a community by the Province of Manitoba in 1972 under the Northern Affairs Act, the settlement does not have a political leader but rather it is represented by someone who is called a "contact person".

The Hudson's Bay Company had a house at Rabbit Point through the mid to late 1800s. It was used as a place to stay while traveling through, but there are no records it was used for trading. The first mention of settler presence in the area began in 1890, and funeral and baptism records note the names of local families from then until present day. A store was built in the small settlement in 1934 and as the little community grew a school followed in 1939. The school changed its name from Princess Harbour School to the Dolly Magnusson School in 1982, the small school would eventually close in 1982. A coal oil fueled harbour light was maintained by the community as regulated by the government at the time.

== Etymology ==
Though it is not known why the community was named Princess Harbour, local history books believe that the name is attributed to the SS Princess that sailed Lake Winnipeg at the turn of the 20th century. The name was not officially changed to Princess Harbour until 1952, when the community got its own post office. It's noted the change of name came as a result of confusion with another location named Rabbit Point or Rabbit Lake somewhere in Manitoba.

== Demographics ==
In the 2021 Census of Population conducted by Statistics Canada, Princess Harbour had a population of 0 living in 0 of its 0 total private dwellings, a change of −100% from its 2016 population of 5. With a land area of 1.9 km^{2} (0.73 sq mi), it had a population density of 0.0/km^{2} (0.0/sq mi) in 2021.
