= Barrows, Manitoba =

Coordinates: 52.831°N 101.443°W

Barrows is a community in the Canadian province of Manitoba.

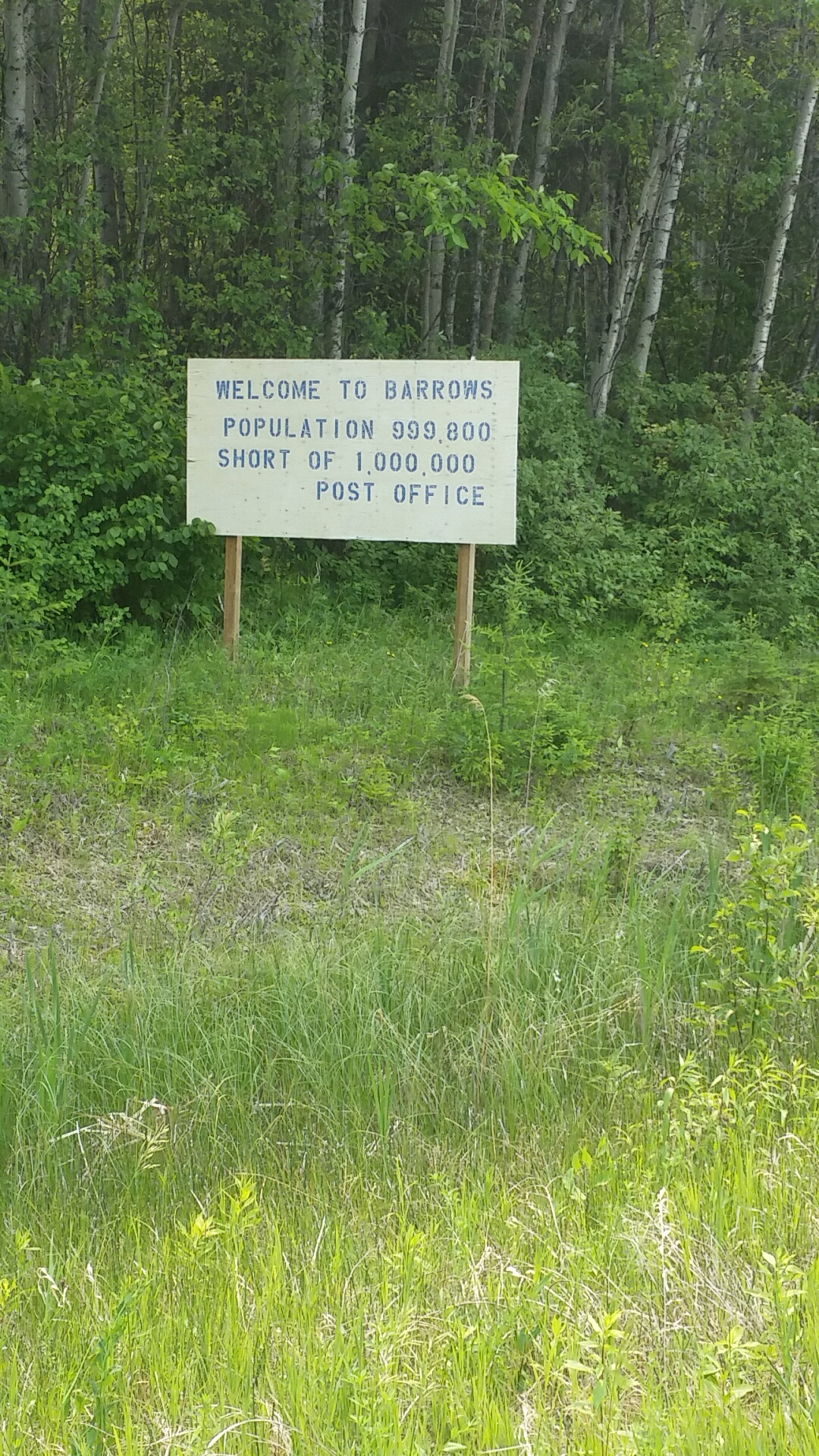
Welcome sign travelling into Barrows, Manitoba.

== Demographics ==
In the 2021 Census of Population conducted by Statistics Canada, Barrows had a population of 83 living in 30 of its 37 total private dwellings, a change of -15.3% from its 2016 population of 98. With a land area of 2.68 km^{2} (1.03 sq mi), it had a population density of 31.0/km^{2} (80.2/sq mi) in 2021.

== History ==
When the Red Deer Lumber Company built its sawmill on the south shore of Red Deer Lake, they also built a rail line that connected their sawmill to the Canadian Northern Railway line that ran from Swan River to Erwood.

A community was established at this junction, which was named Barrows after one of the company's founders: Fredrick G. Barrows.
