= Manitoba Provincial Road 262 =

Provincial road in Manitoba, Canada

Provincial Road 262
- Whirlpool Dr
- PR 262 highlighted in red

Route information
- Maintained by Department of Infrastructure
- Length: 76.4 km (47.5 mi)
- Existed: 1966–present

Major junctions
- North end: PTH 10 / PR 354 at Onanole
- PTH 16A at Minnedosa; PTH 16 (TCH) / YH near Minnedosa
- South end: PTH 10 / PTH 24 at Tremaine

Location
- Country: Canada
- Province: Manitoba
- Rural municipalities: Clanwilliam – Erickson; Harrison Park; Minto-Odanah
- Towns: Minnedosa

Highway system
- Provincial highways in Manitoba; Winnipeg City Routes
| ← PR 261 | → PR 264 |

Provincial Road 262 (PR 262) is a 76.4-kilometre-long (47.5 mi) north-south provincial road in the Westman Region of the Canadian province of Manitoba. It serves as a loop route off of PTH 10 (John Bracken Highway), connecting Tremaine with Onanole on the south side of Riding Mountain National Park via Minnedosa, Clanwilliam, Hilltop, and Scandinavia.

== Route description ==
PR 262 begins at PTH 10/PR 354 at Onanole, and terminates at PTH 10/PTH 24 at Tremaine.

From Onanole, it travels 18 kilometres (11 mi) southeast before turning south and passing through the community of Scandinavia. The road then continues south for 15 kilometres (9.3 mi) before reaching the village of Clanwilliam, intersecting PR 357 near Hilltop and eastbound PR 265 just north of Clanwilliam. After leaving Clanwilliam, PR 262 continues for 14 kilometres (8.7 mi) to meet PTH 16A (Main Street) in Minnedosa, passing Minnedosa Lake which is located northeast of the town centre. Along the way, the road crosses the Trans Canada Trail and meets the eastbound PR 471 just south of Clanwilliam.

PR 262 is known as 2nd Avenue S.E. once it enters Minnedosa's town limits.

PTH 16A and PR 262 continue in concurrence south from Minnedosa for 3 kilometres (1.9 mi), using Main Street, 3rd Avenue S.W., and 1st Street S.W. within the town limits, to meet PTH 16, where PTH 16A ends. PR 262 continues south for 10 kilometres (6.2 mi) to meet eastbound PR 465. From PR 465, the road continues south for 2 kilometres (1.2 mi) before turning west and travelling 7 kilometres (4.3 mi) to its southbound terminus.

The route is gravel for most its length, with a paved section connecting PR 265 north of Clanwilliam and Minnedosa along with the concurrence it shares with PTH 16A to PTH 16 south of Minnedosa.

== History ==
The section of PR 262 between its southern terminus and PTH 16/16A was the original route for PTH 10 before its current section was constructed and opened to traffic in 1962. In the early 1990s, the road was widened, smoothed out, and the paved surface was replaced with gravel. As well, the southern terminus was reconfigured to meet PTH 10 and PTH 24 directly using the old PTH 24 extension. Prior to this, PR 262 met PTH 10 approximately 1 kilometre (0.62 mi) south of its current southern terminus.

Also in the early 1990s, the Manitoba government decommissioned a number of provincial secondary roads and returned the maintenance of these roads back to the rural municipalities. A small portion of the original PR 262 was included in this decommissioning. However, unlike most provincial roads in which the length was shortened or the route decommissioned altogether, PR 262 was slightly lengthened from its original distance.

Prior to this, PR 262's northern terminus was at the southeastern boundary of Riding Mountain National Park, where the road continued as Rolling River Road before meeting PTH 19 within the park limits. From Scandinavia, it turned east from a 'T' junction with PR 263, travelling in a northeasterly direction for approximately 11 kilometres (6.8 mi) to its former northbound terminus. This section is now a municipal road.

After the decommissioning of the original section, PR 262 was rerouted onto the former PR 263, which was decommissioned in its entirety. PR 262 travels to its current northbound terminus on this section.

The original length of PR 262 was 62 kilometres (39 mi).

== Major intersections ==
| Division | Location | km | mi | Destinations | Notes |
|---|---|---|---|---|---|
| Oakview / Minto-Odanah boundary | Tremaine | 0.0 | 0.0 | PTH 10 (John Bracken Highway) – Brandon, Dauphin; PTH 24 west – Rapid City, Oak River | Southern terminus; eastern terminus of PTH 24; southern end of unpaved section; road continues as PTH 24 west |
| Minto-Odanah | | 8.1 | 5.0 | PR 465 east – Cordova | Western terminus of PR 465 |
| Minto-Odanah | | 17.9 | 11.1 | PTH 16 (TCH) / YH – Neepawa, Brandon, Saskatoon; PTH 16A begins | Southern terminus of PTH 16A; southern end of PTH 16A concurrency; northern end of unpaved section |
| Town of Minnedosa | | 20.4 | 12.7 | PTH 16A north (Main Street S) | Northern end of PTH 16A concurrency |
| Minto-Odanah | | 23.8 | 14.8 | Westhope Road (Road 86N) – Minnedosa Airport | Former PR 564 north |
| Minto-Odanah | | 30.4 | 18.9 | PR 471 east (Clanwilliam School Road) – Bethany | Western terminus of PR 471 |
| Minto-Odanah | | 36.9 | 22.9 | PR 265 east (Polonia Road) – Eden | Western terminus of PR 265; southern end of unpaved section |
| Clanwilliam-Erickson | Hilltop | 46.9 | 29.1 | PR 357 – Erickson, Mountain Road | |
| Clanwilliam-Erickson | Scandinavia | 54.2 | 33.7 | Rolling River Road – Riding Mountain National Park | Former PR 262 north |
| Harrison Park | | 66.2 | 41.1 | Bridge over the Rolling River | |
| Harrison Park | Onanole | 76.4 | 47.5 | PTH 10 (John Bracken Highway) – Erickson, Dauphin, Riding Mountain National Park; PR 354 south (Whirlpool Drive) – Lake Audy | Northern terminus; northern end of unpaved section; northern terminus of PR 354; road continues west as PR 354 |
1.000 mi = 1.609 km; 1.000 km = 0.621 mi: Concurrency terminus
