= Manitoba Highway 10 =

Highway in Manitoba, Canada

Provincial Trunk Highway 10
- John Bracken Highway (section); Northern Woods and Water Route (section)
- PTH 10 highlighted in red
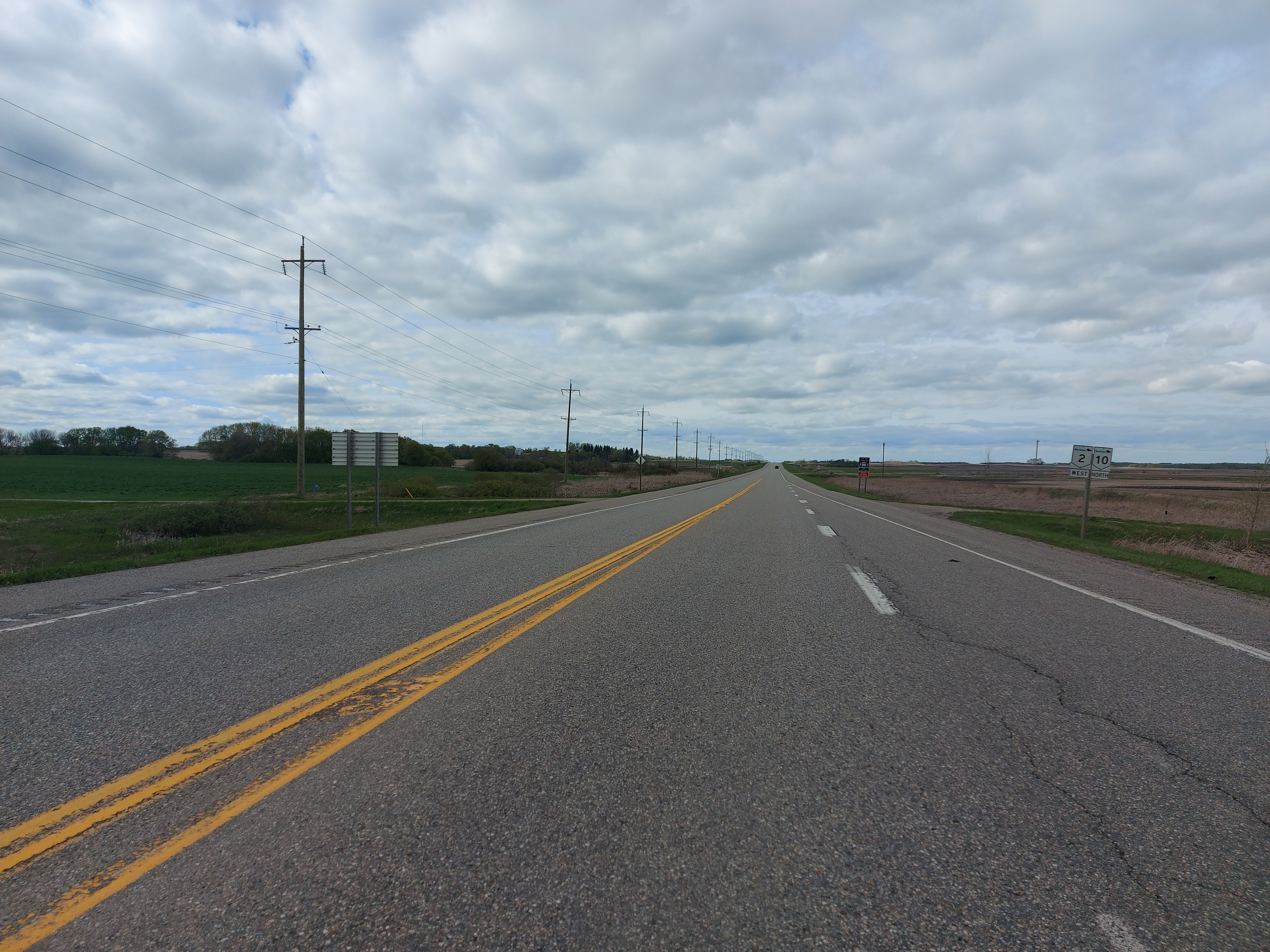
- Highway 10's concurrency with Highway 2 south of Brandon

Route information
- Maintained by Manitoba Infrastructure
- Length: 804 km (500 mi)
- Existed: 1938–present

Major junctions
- South end: US 281 / ND 3 at the U.S. border at the International Peace Garden
- PTH 3 near Boissevain; PTH 2 near Nesbitt; PTH 110 near Brandon; PTH 1 (TCH) in Brandon; PTH 16 (TCH) / YH in Minnedosa; PTH 5 near Dauphin; PTH 20 in Cowan; PTH 83 at Swan River; PTH 60 south of The Pas; PTH 39 south of Cranberry Portage
- North end: Highway 167 at Saskatchewan border at Flin Flon

Location
- Country: Canada
- Province: Manitoba
- Rural municipalities: Boissevain – Morton, Clanwilliam – Erickson, Cornwallis, Dauphin, Elton, Etherbert, Gilbert Plains, Grassland, Harrison Park, Kelsey, Minitonas – Bowsman, Minto – Odanah, Mountain, Oakland – Wawanesa, Swan Valley West
- Major cities: Brandon; Dauphin; Flin Flon
- Towns: Minnedosa; Swan River; The Pas

Highway system
- Provincial highways in Manitoba; Winnipeg City Routes
← PTH 9A	→ PTH 10A

Provincial Trunk Highway 10 (PTH 10) is a provincial primary highway located in the Canadian province of Manitoba. PTH 10 begins at the International Peace Garden along the Canada–United States border near Boissevain. The highway runs north through Brandon, Dauphin, Swan River, and The Pas to the Saskatchewan boundary at Flin Flon. The speed limit is 100 km/h.

PTH 10 is designated as the John Bracken Highway between the International Peace Garden and Riding Mountain National Park, and the Northern Woods and Water Route between Dauphin and The Pas. The highway also serves as the main route through Riding Mountain National Park.

At 804 kilometres (500 mi) in length, PTH 10 is currently the longest highway in the province.

== Route history ==
An earlier PTH 10 was designated in 1926 from Winnipeg to Whitemouth. In 1930, it extended east to Ontario. This was eliminated in 1932–1933, as it became part of PTH 1. PTH 10, in its current state, first appeared on the 1938-39 Manitoba Highway Map. Prior to this, the road appeared in several broken sections with different numbering. Between Minnedosa and Swan River, the highway was known as Highway 6. The highway was designated as Highway 26 between Minnedosa and Brandon, Highway 25 between Brandon and Highway 2, and Highway 20 from Highway 2 to Boissevain. Highway 20 became part of Highway 25 in 1929.

While PTH 10 has largely maintained the same configuration for most of its history, the highway has had a few fairly significant reconfigurations in its time.

Within Brandon, 18th Street between Victoria Avenue and the current junction with PTH 1 was designated as part of PTH 10 in 1962. PTH 1 was reconfigured to its current route in 1959 and included as part of the Trans-Canada Highway system three years later. Prior to this, PTH 10 met PTH 1 (PTH 1A between 1959 and 1962) at the intersection of 18th Street and Victoria Avenue. The two highways would then run in concurrence along Victoria Avenue and 1st Street following the route currently designated as PTH 1A until PTH 10 turned north at an intersection approximately 500 metres (0.31 mi) east of its current junction. The highway would rejoin its current configuration approximately one kilometre (0.62 mi) north of the old intersection. The intersection with PTH 1/1A was moved to its current location in 1959.

The section of PTH 10 between its current junction with PTH 24/PR 262 at Tremaine and eastbound PTH 16 was constructed and opened to traffic in 1962. Prior to this, the highway turned east approximately one kilometre (0.62 mi) south of the current junction. PTH 24 (known as Highway 27 prior to 1956) would travel one kilometre (0.62 mi) past its current eastbound terminus to meet PTH 10. From this point, the highway travelled east for 7 kilometres (4.3 mi) before turning north and travelling for 12 kilometres (7.5 mi), meeting eastbound PTH 16 (known as PTH 4 prior to 1977) two kilometres (1.2 mi) south of Minnedosa. The two highways ran in concurrence from this junction through Minnedosa along what is now PTH 16A to its current northbound/westbound junction. The current highway was shortened by two kilometres (1.2 mi) in 1971 to its current junction with eastbound PTH 16 with the construction of the Minnedosa bypass.

The original section of PTH 10 was redesignated as PR 262 when the provincial government implemented its secondary highway system in 1966.

Prior to 1950, PTH 10's northern terminus was with PTH 83 (then known as Highway 31) at Swan River. The highway was extended to The Pas in 1951, and to its current northern terminus at Flin Flon the following year.

On July 18, 2016, the southernmost section of PTH 10 was designated as the John Bracken Highway in honour of Manitoba's premier between 1922 and 1943.

== Major intersections ==
Division	Location	km	mi	Destinations	Notes
Boissevain-Morton	Peace Garden	0.0	0.0	US 281 south / ND 3 south – Dunseith	Continuation into North Dakota
Boissevain-Morton	Peace Garden	0.0	0.0	Canada–United States border at International Peace Garden Border Crossing	
Boissevain-Morton		13.4	8.3	PR 341 east – William Lake	
Boissevain-Morton		20.2	12.6	PTH 3 (Boundary Commission Trail) – Deloraine, Killarney, Morden	
Boissevain-Morton	Boissevain	25.5	15.8	PR 443 east – Ninga	
Boissevain-Morton	Boissevain	26.8	16.7	Road 16 N (Caranton Road)	Former PR 348 north
Boissevain-Morton		30.0	18.6	PR 448 north	
Boissevain-Morton		41.1	25.5	PR 343 west	
Grassland	Minto	47.6	29.6	PTH 23 east – Ninette	South end of PTH 23 concurrency
Grassland		52.5	32.6	PTH 23 west – Elgin, Hartney	North end of PTH 23 concurrency
Oakland-Wawanesa		69.8	43.4	PTH 2 east (Red Coat Trail) – Treherne, Oak Bluff	South end of PTH 2 concurrency
Oakland-Wawanesa		74.0	46.0	PTH 2 west (Red Coat Trail) – Souris	North end of PTH 2 concurrency
Oakland-Wawanesa		81.8	50.8	PR 453 east	
Cornwallis		86.8	53.9	PR 349 west	
Cornwallis		93.8	58.3	PTH 110 north (Eastern Access) – Brandon	
City of Brandon		96.6	60.0	Richmond Avenue	Former PR 344 south
City of Brandon		98.2	61.0	Victoria Avenue (PTH 1A (TCH))	
City of Brandon		100.3	62.3	Crosses the Assiniboine River	
City of Brandon		100.6	62.5	Grand Valley Road (PR 459 west) / Kirkcaldy Drive	
City of Brandon		103.2	64.1	PTH 1 (TCH) west – Regina	South end of PTH 1 concurrency
City of Brandon		104.8	65.1	PTH 1 (TCH) east – Winnipeg 1st Street – City Route (PTH 1A (TCH) west)	North end of PTH 1 concurrency
Elton	Forrest	113.1	70.3	Justice Road (Road 66N) – Justice	Former PR 561 east
Elton		119.6	74.3	PTH 25 west – Rivers	
Elton		122.9	76.4	PR 353 east – Brookdale	
Minto-Odanah		131.1	81.5	PTH 24 west – Rapid City, Oak River; PR 262 north – Minnedosa	
Minto-Odanah		139.3	86.6	Riverdale Road (Road 81 N)	Former PR 563 west
Minto-Odanah		146.3	90.9	PTH 16 (TCH) east / YH – Minnedosa, Neepawa	South end of PTH 16 concurrency
Town of Minnedosa		149.8	93.1	PR 355 – Cardale, Minnedosa	
Minto-Odanah		152.5	94.8	PTH 16 (TCH) west / YH – Russell, Saskatoon; PTH 16A east – Minnedosa	North end of PTH 16 concurrency
Minto-Odanah		160.7	99.9	Newdale Road (Road 91 N) – Newdale	Former PR 473 west
Clanwilliam-Erickson	Erickson	175.9	109.3	PR 357 east – Mountain Road	
Clanwilliam-Erickson		183.0	113.7	PTH 45 west (Russell Subdivision Trail) – Sandy Lake, Oakburn	
Harrison Park	Onanole	193.9	120.5	PR 262 south – Scandinavia, Clanwilliam	Former PR 263 east
Harrison Park	Onanole	194.1	120.6	PR 354 west – Crawford Park	Former PR 263 west
No. 17		197.3	122.6	South gate of Riding Mountain National Park	
No. 17		203.2	126.3	PTH 19 east – Lake Katherine, Whirlpool Lake	
Dauphin		249.9	155.3	North gate of Riding Mountain National Park	
Dauphin		257.3	159.9	PTH 5 east – Ste. Rose du Lac, Neepawa	South end of PTH 5 concurrency
Dauphin		261.4	162.4	PTH 5A west / PTH 10A north – Dauphin	South end of Dauphin Bypass
Dauphin		266.5	165.6	PTH 5A east / PTH 10A south – Dauphin	North end of Dauphin Bypass
Dauphin		274.7	170.7	PR 274 south – Keld	
Gilbert Plains	Ashville	281.2	174.7	PTH 5 west – Roblin	North end of PTH 5 concurrency; PTH 10 branches north
Ethelbert		305.7	190.0	PR 267 – Drifting River, Sifton	
Ethelbert		315.5	196.0	PR 273 east – Ukraina	
Ethelbert		322.3	200.3	PTH 10A north – Ethelbert	
Ethelbert	Ethelbert	324.9	201.9	PTH 10A east (NWWR) – Ethelbert; PR 274 south – Mink Creek	South end of Northern Woods and Water Route
Ethelbert		326.7	203.0	PR 269 east – Fork River	
Ethelbert		340.1	211.3	Road 182 N – Garland	Former PR 489 east
Ethelbert		341.8	212.4	PR 367 west – Duck Mountain Park	
Mountain	Pine River	355.5	220.9	PR 271 east – Pine River	
Mountain	Cowan	386.0	239.8	PTH 20 south (NWWR) – Camperville, Winnipegosis	Northern Woods and Water Route alternate route
Minitonas-Bowsman		412.3	256.2	PR 268 north (Lenwsood Highway) – Lenswood	
Minitonas-Bowsman	Minitonas	418.8	260.2	PR 366 south – Minitonas	South end of PR 366 concurrency
Minitonas-Bowsman		420.4	261.2	PR 366 north – Bowsman	North end of PR 366 concurrency
Minitonas-Bowsman		428.6	266.3	PR 488 south	
Swan Valley West	No major junctions				
Town of Swan River		433.8	269.6	PTH 10A north / PTH 83A south (Main Street E) – Swan River PTH 83 south (Valley Road) – Roblin	
Swan Valley West		436.2	271.0	PTH 10A south – Swan River	
Swan Valley West		447.4	278.0	PR 279 west – Whitefish Lake	
Minitonas-Bowsman	Bowsman	450.0	279.6	PR 266 north	
Mountain	Birch River	470.9	292.6	PR 268 south – Birch River	
Mountain		475.4	295.4	PR 365 west – Bell Lake Provincial Park, North Steeprock Lake Provincial Park	
Mountain		509.2	316.4	PTH 77 west – Barrows, Hudson Bay	Former PR 277 west
Mountain		518.6	322.2	PR 483 east – Pelican Rapids	
No. 21		588.1	365.4	PTH 60 east – Easterville, Grand Rapids	
Kelsey		628.8	390.7	PR 282 north	
Town of The Pas		661.6	411.1	PR 283 west (3rd Street W / NWWR) – Hudson Bay; PR 285 east (3rd Street E) – Ralls Island	North end of Northern Woods and Water Route
Town of The Pas		662.8	411.8	Crosses the Saskatchewan River	
No. 21	Clearwater Lake; Provincial Park	681.6	423.5	PR 287 east – Cormorant, Moose Lake, The Pas Airport	
No. 21	Atik	720.0	447.4	Sturgeon Landing Road to Highway 967 – Sturgeon Landing	
No. 21	Grass River; Provincial Park	736.9	457.9	PTH 39 east – Snow Lake, Thompson	
No. 21		757.3	470.6	Sherridon Access Road – Sherridon, Pukatawagan, Twin Lakes Provincial Park	Provides access to Pukawatagan ice road
City of Flin Flon		795.2	494.1	PR 291 west – Channing, Big Island Lake	
City of Flin Flon		797.8	495.7	PTH 10A west (Flin Flon East Access)	
City of Flin Flon		803.6	499.3	First Avenue (PTH 10A east)	PTH 10A is unsigned
City of Flin Flon		804.2	499.7	Highway 167 south to Highway 106 (Hansen Lake Road) – Creighton, Prince Albert	Continuation into Saskatchewan
1.000 mi = 1.609 km; 1.000 km = 0.621 mi: Concurrency terminus; Route transition

== Related routes ==
=== Provincial Trunk Highway 10A ===
Provincial Trunk Highway 10A
- Location: Dauphin, Ethelbert, Flin Flon, Swan River

Provincial Trunk Highway 10A (PTH 10A) is the designation of four different alternate routes of PTH 10, serving the towns of Dauphin, Ethelbert, Flin Flon, and Swan River, primarily running along PTH 10's original alignments through the centre of these communities.

=== Provincial Road 262 ===
Provincial Road 262
- Location: Tremaine - Onanole
- Length: 69.4 km (43.1 mi)
- Existed: 1966–present

Provincial Road 262 (PR 262) is a 69.4-kilometre-long (43.1 mi) north-south loop off of PTH 10 in the Rural Municipalities of Minto-Odanah, Clanwilliam-Erickson, and Harrison Park, as well as running through the town of Minnedosa.

=== Provincial Road 268 ===
Provincial Road 268
- Lenswood Highway
- Location: Minitonas - Birch River
- Length: 45 km (28 mi)
- Existed: 1966–present

Provincial Road 268 (PR 268), also known as the Lenswood Highway, is a 45-kilometre-long (28 mi) north-south loop off of PTH 10 within the Swan River Valley in the rural municipalities of Minitonas-Bowsman and Mountain, serving as the main road access to the hamlet of Lenswood, as well as a short cut for travellers on PTH 10 wishing to bypass Swan River. It runs from just east of Minitonas to the town of Birch River.

=== Provincial Road 273 ===
Provincial Road 273
- Location: Ukraina
- Length: 7.1 km (4.4 mi)
- Existed: 1973–present

Provincial Road 273 (PR 273) is a 7.1-kilometre-long (4.4 mi) east-west spur of PTH 10 in the Rural Municipalities of Ethelbert and Mossey River, linking the highway to the small hamlet of Ukraina. Its entire length is a rural, gravel, two-lane road, with no other settlements or major intersections.

Division	Location	km	mi	Destinations	Notes
Ethelbert		0.0	0.0	PTH 10 (NWWR) – Dauphin, Ethelbert	Western terminus
Mossey River	Ukraina	7.1	4.4	Road 119 / Road 168N – Fishing River	Eastern terminus; road continues east as Road 168N towards Fishing River and PTH 20
1.000 mi = 1.609 km; 1.000 km = 0.621 mi

=== Provincial Road 279 ===
Provincial Road 279
- Location: Whitefish Lake Provincial Park - Bowsman
- Length: 32.1 km (19.9 mi)
- Existed: 1966–present

Provincial Road 279 (PR 279) is a 32.1-kilometre-long (19.9 mi) east–west highway in the Parkland Region of Manitoba, serving as a connection between PTH 10 (Northern Woods and Water Route) near Bowsman and Whitefish Lake Provincial Park, which is located within the Porcupine Provincial Forest. It is entirely a rural two-lane highway, with a portion being an unpaved gravel road. PR 279 only has one major intersection along its entire length, being a junction with the short PR 588.

Division	Location	km	mi	Destinations	Notes
Porcupine Provincial Forest	Whitefish Lake Provincial Park	0.0	0.0	Whitefish Lake Provincial Park main entrance	Dead end; western terminus
Swan Valley West		17.2	10.7	PR 588 south – Big Woody	Northern terminus of PR 588
Swan Valley West		23.2	14.4	Pavement begins	
Swan Valley West		32.1	19.9	PTH 10 (NWWR) – Bowsman, Swan River	Eastern terminus
1.000 mi = 1.609 km; 1.000 km = 0.621 mi

=== Provincial Road 285 ===
Provincial Road 285
- 3rd Street E
- Location: The Pas
- Length: 14.4 km (8.9 mi)
- Existed: 1966–present

Provincial Road 285 (PR 285) is a 14.4-kilometre-long (8.9 mi) east-west spur of PTH 10 in the town of The Pas and the Rural Municipality of Kelsey, connecting the town with residences on Ralls Island.

PR 285 begins in downtown The Pas along 3rd Street E at an intersection between PTH 10 (Fischer Ave / Northern Woods and Water Route south) and PR 283 (3rd Street W / NWWR north). It heads northeast through downtown for several blocks to cross a railroad line and have an intersection with PR 289 (Lathlin Avenue), which leads to The Pas/Grace Lake Airport. The highway travels through neighbourhoods for several blocks before traveling through a portion of the Opaskwayak Cree Nation to enter the Rural Municipality of Kelsey. PR 285 travels along the banks of the Saskatchewan River for a few kilometres, passing several riverside homes before turning away from the river and making a sharp left turn onto Lapointe Road and crossing Ralls Creek onto Ralls Island. The highway makes a right onto Kryschuk Road, where it becomes unpaved, which it follows for a couple kilometres to make a left onto Lamb Road and coming to a dead end at the banks of the river.

Division	Location	km	mi	Destinations	Notes
Town of The Pas		0.0	0.0	PTH 10 (Fischer Avenue / NWWR south) – Flin Flon, Swan River; PR 283 west (3rd Street W / NWWR north) – Hudson Bay, SK	Western terminus; eastern terminus of PR 283
Town of The Pas		0.5	0.31	PR 289 east (Lathlin Avenue) – The Pas/Grace Lake Airport	Western terminus of PR 289
Opaskwayak Cree Nation	No major junctions				
Kelsey		10.0	6.2	Kryschuk Road	Pavement ends
Kelsey		14.4	8.9	Dead end at Saskatchewan River	Eastern terminus
1.000 mi = 1.609 km; 1.000 km = 0.621 mi

=== Provincial Road 289 ===
Provincial Road 289
- Grace Lake Road
- Location: The Pas
- Length: 3.8 km (2.4 mi)
- Existed: 1966–present

Provincial Road 289 (PR 289), also known as Grace Lake Road for the majority of its length, is a short 3.8 kilometres (2.4 mi) spur of PTH 10 the town of The Pas and the Rural Municipality of Kelsey, connecting the town with its airport, The Pas/Grace Lake Airport.

PR 289 begins along Lathlin Avenue at an intersection with PR 285 (3rd Street E) just across the railroad tracks from downtown and 0.5 kilometres (0.31 mi) from its intersection with PTH 10. It heads south for a couple blocks before making a left onto Grace Lake Road and heading east through neighbourhoods. The highway travels past the Margaret Barbour Collegiate Institute and a middle school to have an intersection with Fafard Avenue, which provides access to the University College of the North, before leaving town (but not the city limits) and heading east through woodlands. While approaching the coastline of Grace Lake, the highway officially leaves The Pas and enters the Rural Municipality of Kelsey, where it becomes unpaved. After having an intersection with the access road to the airport (Clubhouse Road), PR 285 comes to a dead end shortly thereafter at the Grace Lake Boardwalk. The entire length of PR 289 is a two-lane highway.

Division	Location	km	mi	Destinations	Notes
Town of The Pas		0.0	0.0	PR 285 (3rd Street E) to PTH 10 – Ralls Island	Western terminus
Town of The Pas		1.5	0.93	Fafard Avenue – University College of the North	
The Pas / Rural Municipality of Kelsey boundary		2.4	1.5	Pavement ends	Road turns to gravel
Kelsey		3.7	2.3	Clubhouse Road – The Pas/Grace Lake Airport	Access road to airport
Kelsey		3.8	2.4	Dead end at Grace Lake Boardwalk	Eastern terminus
1.000 mi = 1.609 km; 1.000 km = 0.621 mi

=== Provincial Road 291 ===
Provincial Road 291
- Location: Flin Flon
- Length: 4.5 km (2.8 mi)
- Existed: 1966–present

Provincial Road 291 (PR 291) is short 4.5-kilometre-long (2.8 mi) east–west highway located entirely in the city of Flin Flon, connecting PTH 10A near downtown with the Channing neighbourhood and PTH 10 on the western edge of town. Between PTH 10A and Channing, it is known as Channing Drive and is paved while between Channing and PTH 10, it is known as Flin Flon Highway and is an unpaved gravel road. Both sections are two-lanes wide. For around 0.5 kilometres (0.31 mi), PR 291 does briefly cross into neighbouring Saskatchewan along Channing Drive.

Division	Location	km	mi	Destinations	Notes
City of Flin Flon		0.0	0.0	PTH 10A (Third Avenue / Channing Drive)	Western terminus; road begins along Channing Drive
City of Flin Flon		2.8	1.7	Channing Drive To Highway 167 – Creighton	Road becomes unpaved and begins following along Flin Flon Highway
City of Flin Flon		4.5	2.8	PTH 10 – Flin Flon, Cranberry Portage	Eastern terminus; road continues for a short distance to Big Island Lake as Westwood Road
1.000 mi = 1.609 km; 1.000 km = 0.621 mi

=== Provincial Road 343 ===
Provincial Road 343
- Croll Road
- Location: Croll
- Length: 18.1 km (11.2 mi)
- Existed: 1966–present

Provincial Road 343 (PR 343), also known as Croll Road, is a 18.1-kilometre-long (11.2 mi) east-west spur of PTH 10 in the Municipality of Boissevain-Morton, Manitoba. Previously extending another 18.1 kilometres (11.2 mi) west to the hamlets of Dand, Regent, and PTH 21 in the Municipality of Deloraine-Winchester, since 1992 it only extends as far west as the junction with PR 448. It is entirely a two-lane gravel road, travelling through rural farmland with the only settlement of notion being the tiny locality of Croll.

Division	Location	km	mi	Destinations	Notes
Boissevain-Morton		0.0	0.0	PR 448 – Whitewater Lake, Elgin; Road 23N – Regent, Dand	Western terminus; road continues west as Road 23N (former PR 343 west)
Boissevain-Morton		6.6	4.1	Road 120W	Former PR 348 south
Boissevain-Morton		9.9	6.2	PR 444 north – Elgin	Southern terminus of PR 444; former PR 348 north
Boissevain-Morton		18.1	11.2	PTH 10 (John Bracken Highway) – Boissevain, Minto	Eastern terminus; road continues east as Road 23N
1.000 mi = 1.609 km; 1.000 km = 0.621 mi

=== Provincial Road 365 ===
Provincial Road 365
- Location: Porcupine Provincial Forest
- Length: 29.7 km (18.5 mi)
- Existed: 1980–present

Provincial Road 365 (PR 365) is a 29.7-kilometre-long (18.5 mi) east-west spur of PTH 10 (Northern Woods and Water Route), running deep into the heart of the Manitoba section of the Porcupine Provincial Forest to provide access to Bell Lake Provincial Park and North Steeprock Lake Provincial Park. It is a two-lane unpaved gravel road for its entire length, winding its way through hilly and remote wooded terrain. At its western end, the road continues as an unnamed gravel road deeper into the Provincial Forest.

Division	Location	km	mi	Destinations	Notes
Mountain		0.0	0.0	PTH 10 (NWWR) – The Pas, Swan River	Eastern terminus
No. 20 North	Porcupine Provincial Forest	17.5	10.9	Bell Lake Provincial Park	Access road into park
No. 20 North	Porcupine Provincial Forest	27.8	17.3	North Steeprock Lake Provincial Park	Access road into park
No. 20 North	Porcupine Provincial Forest	29.7	18.5	North Steeprock Lake boat launch	Western terminus; road continues as unnamed gravel road further into the provincial forest
1.000 mi = 1.609 km; 1.000 km = 0.621 mi

=== Provincial Road 443 ===
Provincial Road 443
- Mountain Street
- Location: Boissevain - Ninga
- Length: 13.3 km (8.3 mi)
- Existed: 1966–present

Provincial Road 443 (PR 443) is a 13.3-kilometre-long (8.3 mi) spur of PTH 10 in the southern portion of the Westman Region, providing a connection between the towns of Boissevain and Ninga. It is entirely a paved two-lane highway, while also being known as Mountain Street within Boissevain.

Division	Location	km	mi	Destinations	Notes
Boissevain-Morton	Boissevain	0.0	0.0	PTH 10 (Mill Road / John Bracken Highway) – International Peace Garden, Brandon	Western terminus
Killarney-Turtle Mountain	Ninga	12.6	7.8	Morton Street – Ninga	
Killarney-Turtle Mountain	Ninga	13.3	8.3	PR 346 – Margaret, Killarney	Eastern terminus
1.000 mi = 1.609 km; 1.000 km = 0.621 mi

=== Provincial Road 483 ===
Provincial Road 483
- Location: Sapotaweyak Cree Nation - Pelican Rapids
- Length: 27.3 km (17.0 mi)
- Existed: 2000–present

Provincial Road 483 (PR 483) is a 27.3-kilometre-long (17.0 mi) east-west spur of PTH 10 in the Rural Municipality of Mountain and the Sapotaweyak Cree Nation. It connects the highway with First Nation's main settlement, Shoal River, as well as the hamlet of Pelican Rapids. Throughout the majority of its length, PR 483 runs either along or near the coastline of Lake Winnipegosis. PR 483 is a paved two-lane highway in its entirety.

Provincial Road 483
- Merridale Road
- Location: Merridale - Duck Mountain Provincial Forest
- Length: 19.0 km (11.8 mi)
- Existed: 1966–1992

Between 1966 and 1992, the PR 483 designation was applied to what is now known as Merridale Road, running from PTH 83 eastward through Merridale, where it crossed both the Shell River and PR 584, before ending at the Duck Mountain Provincial Forest boundary, continuing into the forest as an unnamed road. The entire route was a gravel, two-lane road.

Division	Location	km	mi	Destinations	Notes
Mountain		0.0	0.0	PTH 10 (NWWR) – Swan River, The Pas	Western terminus
Sapotaweyak Cree Nation		5.7	3.5	Bridge over the Steeprock River	
Sapotaweyak Cree Nation		14.5	9.0	Bridge over the Bell River	
Sapotaweyak Cree Nation		16.4	10.2	Pebble Beach	Access road to recreation area
No. 19	Pelican Rapids	27.3	17.0	Beardy Pt / Monroe Street	Eastern terminus; connection to Shoal River made via Pelican Rapids city streets
1.000 mi = 1.609 km; 1.000 km = 0.621 mi

=== Provincial Road 488 ===
Provincial Road 488
- Location: Municipality of Swan Valley West - Municipality of Minitonas-Bowsman
- Length: 21.7 km (13.5 mi)
- Existed: 1966–present

Provincial Road 488 (PR 488) is a 21.7-kilometre-long (13.5 mi) north-south spur of PTH 10 in Swan River Valley, providing access to local farms in the area as well as the localities of Pretty Valley and Lidstone. It is mostly a gravel two-lane road, with a short paved section near its north end. The highway does include a railway crossing just south of its intersection with PTH 10.

Division	Location	km	mi	Destinations	Notes
Swan Valley West		0.0	0.0	PR 486 – Durban, Swan River	Southern terminus
Swan Valley West	Pretty Valley	1.4	0.87	Bridge over the Roaring River	
Municipality of Minitonas-Bowsman		12.1	7.5	Bridge over Minitonas Creek	
Municipality of Minitonas-Bowsman		13.1	8.1	PR 485	
Municipality of Minitonas-Bowsman		14.0	8.7	Bridge over Minitonas Creek	
Municipality of Minitonas-Bowsman		19.5	12.1	Pavement Begins	
Municipality of Minitonas-Bowsman		20.5	12.7	Bridge over the Roaring River	
Municipality of Minitonas-Bowsman		21.7	13.5	PTH 10 (NWWR) – Swan River, Minitonas	Northern terminus; road continues north as Road 156W
1.000 mi = 1.609 km; 1.000 km = 0.621 mi

=== Sherridon Access Road ===
Sherridon Access Road
- Location: Twin Lakes Provincial Park - Sherridon
- Length: 78 km (48 mi)
- Existed: 1980s–present

The Sherridon Access Road, also known as Highway 800, is a 78-kilometre-long (48 mi) gravel road connecting PTH 10 to the hamlet of Sherridon, the Pukatawagan Ice road, as well as Twin Lakes Provincial Park at its very southern end. The road originated in the 1980s with the construction of the Puffy Lake Mine.

=== Sturgeon Landing Road ===
Sturgeon Landing Road
- Location: Sturgeon Landing - Atik
- Length: 33.6 km (20.9 mi)

Sturgeon Landing Road, also known as Namew Lake Road, is a 33.6-kilometre-long (20.9 mi) east–west spur of PTH 10, connecting it with the hamlet of Sturgeon Landing, Saskatchewan directly on the provincial border, as well as Saskatchewan Highway 967 (Hwy 967). It is an unpaved gravel road for its entire length.

The road begins at the Saskatchewan provincial border, with the road continuing west and immediately entering Sturgeon Landing as Hwy 967. It winds its way southeast along the coastline of Namew Lake for several kilometres to come to a three-way stop, where it makes a sharp left. The road now widens to a two-lane gravel highway and heads due east through remote woodlands for 25 kilometres (16 mi), travelling past several small lakes before crossing the Keewatin Railway at Atik and coming to an end shortly thereafter at an intersection with PTH 10 between Cranberry Portage and Wanless.

Division	Location	km	mi	Destinations	Notes
No. 21		0.0	0.0	Highway 967 west – Sturgeon Landing	Continuation beyond Saskatchewan border; western terminus; eastern terminus of Hwy 967
No. 21	Atik	33.6	20.9	PTH 10 – Wanless, Cranberry Portage	Eastern terminus
1.000 mi = 1.609 km; 1.000 km = 0.621 mi
