= List of Manitoba provincial highways =

Manitoba Provincial Highway System
- Standard highway markers for Manitoba

System information
- Maintained by Manitoba Infrastructure

Highway names
- Provincial Trunk Highways: Provincial Trunk Highway XX (PTH XX)
- Provincial Roads: Provincial Road XXX (PR XXX)

The following is a list of Manitoba provincial trunk highways and provincial roads. Provincial Trunk Highways are the primary highways, and Provincial Roads are the secondary highways.

== Primary routes ==
These Provincial Trunk Highways are numbered from 1 to 99 for mainline routes and 100 to 199 for loop/spur routes (only four currently exist).

Provincial Trunk Highways 1 and 75, as well as the Perimeter Highway (PTH 100/PTH 101), are the most important and are divided highways for most of their length with some sections at expressway or freeway standards. PTHs 1A (Brandon), 3, 4, 7, 8, 9, 9A, 10, 12, 14, 16, 44, 52 and 59 also have some divided sections. Speed limits are generally 90 km/h (55 mph) to 110 km/h (70 mph).

Number	Length (km)	Length (mi)	Southern or western terminus	Northern or eastern terminus	Local names	Formed	Removed	Notes
PTH 1 (TCH)	489	304	Highway 1 (TCH) at Saskatchewan boundary near Kirkella	Highway 17 at Ontario boundary near West Hawk Lake	• Trans-Canada Highway • Yellowhead Highway (Portage La Prairie – Winnipeg)	c. 1926	current	
PTH 1 (TCH)	—	—	(Sections)			—	—	Rerouted; one old route became part of PTH 21 and rest removed in 1949
PTH 1 (TCH)	265	165	Portage la Prairie	West Hawk Lake		—	1958	Rerouted; became part of PTH 4 in 1958 (this section became PTH 1A, PTH 26, PTH 9, and PTH 44 in 1968)
PTH 1A (TCH)	31	19	PTH 1 (TCH) near Kemnay PTH 1 (TCH) west of Portage la Prairie	PTH 1 (TCH) / PTH 10 in Brandon PTH 1 (TCH) east of Portage la Prairie		—	—	Former sections of PTH 1
PTH 1A	37	23	PTH 1 west of Carberry	PTH 1 east of Carberry		1958	1966	Former section of PTH 1; replaced by PR 351
PTH 2	315	196	Highway 13 at Saskatchewan boundary near Sinclair	PTH 100 (TCH) at Oak Bluff	Red Coat Trail	—	—	
PTH 3	395	245	Highway 18 at Saskatchewan boundary near Pierson	Route 155 at Winnipeg city limits	Boundary Commission Trail	—	—	Formerly continued into Winnipeg along McGillivray Blvd. to PTH 75 (Pembina Hwy.); replaced by Route 155 in 1966.
PTH 3A	11	6.8	PTH 3 south of Clearwater	PTH 3 / PTH 34 / PR 423 east of Clearwater		—	—	
PTH 4	9	5.6	PTH 9 / PTH 9A northwest of Selkirk	PTH 59 northeast of Selkirk		1988	current	
PTH 4	267	166	Saskatchewan boundary near Harrowby	PTH 1 west of Portage La Prairie	Yellowhead Highway	1928	1977	Replaced by PTH 16
PTH 4	284	176	PTH 1 west of Portage la Prairie	PTH 1 at West Hawk Lake		1958	1968	Section replaced by PTH 26, PTH 9, PTH 44
PTH 4A	9	5.6	Business route through Minnedosa			1971	1977	Former PTH 4; replaced by PTH 16A
PTH 4A	9	5.6	PTH 1 in Portage La Prairie	Former PTH 4 at Macdonald		1953	1966	Now Main Street, Road 71N, (former PR 249) and PR 240
PTH 4B	3	1.9	Business route through Beausejour			—	1965	
PTH 4	284	176	PTH 1 west of Portage La Prairie	PTH 1 near the Ontario boundary		1958	1968	Replaced by PTH 26, PTH 9, PTH 44
PTH 5	401	249	ND 4 at Canada–U.S. border near Cartwright	Highway 10 at Saskatchewan boundary near Roblin	• Parks Route • Northern Woods and Water Route (Ste. Rose du Lac – Ochre River)	—	—	
PTH 5	30	19	Ochre River	PTH 10 in Dauphin		—	1959	Section replaced by PTH 20 and PTH 5A
PTH 5A	8	5.0	Business route through Dauphin			1959	current	Former PTH 5; concurrent with PTH 10A for entire length
PTH 6	732	455	PTH 101 northeast of Winnipeg	PR 391 in Thompson		1947	current	Formerly continued into Winnipeg along Brookside Blvd. and Notre Dame Ave. to downtown Winnipeg; replaced by PTH 101, Route 90, Route 47, Route 57, and Route 62 in 1966.
PTH 6	196	122	PTH 5 near Ashville	Saskatchewan boundary near Benito		1928	1947	Replaced by PTH 10 and PTH 49 in 1938 east of Swan River, remainder replaced by PTH 31 in 1947 (PTH 31 was replaced by PTH 83 in 1954)
PTH 7	104	65	Route 90 at Winnipeg city limits	PTH 68 at Arborg		—	—	Formerly continued into Winnipeg along Brookside Blvd. and Century St. to PTH 1 / PTH 4 (Portage Ave.); replaced by Route 90 in 1966.
PTH 7	—	—	PTH 6 northwest of Winnipeg	Fisher Branch		—	1951	Section through Stonewall removed in 1951 (now PR 236); section from Fraserwood to Fisher Branch renumbered to PTH 16 (became PTH 17 in 1977)
PTH 8	162	101	Route 180 at Winnipeg city limits	Hecla-Grindstone Provincial Park	Veterans Memorial Highway	—	—	Formerly continued into Winnipeg along McPhillips St. and Arlington St. to PTH 1 / PTH 4 (Portage Ave.); replaced by Route 180 in 1966.
PTH 8A	3	1.9	PTH 8 north of Winnipeg	PTH 9 / PR 238 north of Winnipeg		1964	1968	Replaced by PTH 27
PTH 9	84	52	Route 52 at Winnipeg city limits	PR 222 / PR 231 in Gimli		—	—	Formerly PTH 1 and PTH 4 south of Lockport.
PTH 9	—	—	Downtown Winnipeg	PTH 222 / PR 231 in Lockport	Henderson Highway	—	1968	Section through Winnipeg became Route 40 (now Route 42); replaced by PR 204 and PTH 44
PTH 9A	7.4	4.6	PTH 9 near Selkirk	PTH 4 / PTH 9 in Selkirk		1960	current	
PTH 10	804	500	US 281 / ND 3 at Canada–U.S. border near Boissevain	Highway 167 at Saskatchewan boundary at Flin Flon		1938	current	
PTH 10	152	94	PTH 4 at Lockport	Ontario border near West Hawk Lake		1926	1932	Replaced by PTH 1 (now PTH 44)
PTH 10	—	—	Sections			—	—	Section east and north concurrent with PTH 1 became concurrent with PTH 1A in 1959, and an extension of 18th Street to PTH 1 was under construction. When this was completed in 1962, PTH 10 was rerouted onto the new road and along the new route of PTH 1. When the current route between PTH 24 and PTH 16 opened, the old route was eliminated in 1962, but became PR 262 in 1966.
PTH 10A	19	12	Business routes through Dauphin, Ethelbert, Swan River, and Flin Flon.			—	—	Former sections PTH 10
PTH 11	140	87	PTH 1 (TCH) near Hadashville	PTH 59 south of Victoria Beach		1926	current	
PTH 11	55	34	PTH 12 near Ste. Anne	Hadashville		—	1958	Replaced by PTH 1
PTH 12	256	159	MN 313 at Canada–U.S. border near Middlebro	Grand Beach	MOM's Way (U.S. Border – Ste. Anne)	1926	current	
PTH 12	38	24	PTH 59 in Winnipeg	Ste. Anne		1926	1958	Replaced by PTH 1
PTH 12	51	32	PTH 59 near Beaconia	PTH 11 at Pine Falls		1959	1966	Replaced by PTH 59 and PTH 11
PTH 12G	7	4.3	PTH 12	Grand Beach		1959	1966	Former PTH 22A; replaced by PTH 12
PTH 12V	9	5.6	PTH 12	Victoria Beach		1959	1966	Former PTH 22; replaced by PTH 59
PTH 13	51	32	PTH 3 / PR 245 in Carman	PTH 1 / PR 430 near Oakville		1947	current	
PTH 13	3	1.9	Canada–U.S. border near Emerson	PTH 14 (present-day PTH 75) of Emerson		—	1941	Replaced by PTH 75; now part of PR 200 (border crossing now closed).
PTH 13	37	23	Carman	PTH 1 at St. Francois Xavier		1947	1958	Section became part of PTH 1
PTH 14	50	31	PTH 3 near Winkler	PTH 75 near Letellier		1950	current	
PTH 14	106	66	Canada–U.S. border near Emerson	Winnipeg		—	1949	Replaced by PTH 75
PTH 14A	25	16	Canada–U.S. border at Gretna	PTH 14 / PR 332 at Rosenfeld		—	1968	Replaced by PTH 30
PTH 15	77	48	PTH 101 / Route 115 in Winnipeg	PTH 11 at Elma		1953	current	Formerly continued into Winnipeg along Dugald Rd. to PTH 59 (Lagimodière Blvd.); replaced by Route 115 in 1966.
PTH 15	—	—	Ste. Anne	Canada–U.S. border near Piney		1930	1939	Eliminated due to the discontinuation of Municipal PTHs; now PTH 12, PTH 52, PR 210, PR 203, and PTH 89.
PTH 16 (TCH)	267	166	Highway 16 (TCH) at Saskatchewan boundary near Harrowby	PTH 1 (TCH) / PR 305 west of Portage La Prairie	• Yellowhead Highway • Trans-Canada Highway	1977	current	Formerly PTH 4
PTH 16	100	62	PTH 1 west of Portage La Prairie	Route 52 / Route 85 in Winnipeg (Portage and Main)	Yellowhead Highway	1977	1990	Formerly PTH 4; cosigned with PTH 1; section dropped when PTH 16 assumed the TCH designation.
PTH 16	70	43	PTH 7 near Fraserwood	PR 224 / PR 233 at Fisher Branch		1966	1979	Replaced by PR 231 and PR 228 (PR 228 replaced by PTH 17 in 1983)
PTH 16A	9	5.6	Business route through Minnedosa			1977	current	Formerly PTH 4A
PTH 17	127	79	PTH 9 near Winnipeg Beach	PR 224 / PR 325 near Hodgson		1983	current	
PTH 17	10	6.2	Canada–U.S. border near Fallison	PTH 3 near Crystal City		1928	1964	Replaced by PTH 34
PTH 18	65	40	ND 30 at Canada–U.S. border near Lena	PTH 2 southeast of Wawanesa		1928	current	
PTH 19	34	21	PTH 10 near Wasagaming	PTH 5 at Norgate		1947	current	
PTH 19	55	34	PTH 3 at Killarney	PTH 2 southeast of Wawanesa		1928	1929	Replaced by PTH 18
PTH 20	169	105	PTH 5 / PR 582 at Ochre River	PTH 10 at Cowan	Northern Woods & Water Route	1948	current	
PTH 20	48	30	PTH 2 east of Carroll	Boissevain		1928	1929	Replaced by PTH 25; now part of PTH 10
PTH 20A	5	3.1	Business route through Dauphin			1959	current	Former PTH 5 (southern section)
PTH 21	189	117	ND 14 at Canada–U.S. border near Goodlands	PTH 45 / PR 577 at Oakburn		—	—	
PTH 22	22	14	PTH 23 near Elgin	PTH 2 / PR 250 in Souris		1960	current	
PTH 22	104	65	Canada–U.S. border near Lena	PTH 1 near Virden		—	1953	Replaced by PTH 83
PTH 22	104	65	PTH 15 at Anola	Victoria Beach		1953	1959	Replaced by PTH 12 and PTH 12V
PTH 22A	7	4.3	Former PTH 22	Grand Beach		1955	1959	Replaced by PTH 12G (now PTH 12)
PTH 23	276	171	PTH 21 near Hartney	PTH 59 in La Rochelle		1950	current	
PTH 23	35	22	Former PTH 22 near Melita	PTH 21 near Deloraine		—	1929	Replaced by PTH 3
PTH 24	82	51	PTH 83 at Miniota	PTH 10 / PR 262 at Tremaine		1956	current	Former PTH 27
PTH 24	27	17	Saskatchewan boundary near Pierson	Former PTH 22 near Elva		—	1949	Replaced by PTH 3
PTH 25	29	18	PR 259 near Wheatland	PTH 10 near Forrest		1953	current	
PTH 25	98	61	Canada–U.S. border near Boissevain	PTH 1 in Brandon		1928	1938	Replaced by PTH 10
PTH 26	64	40	PTH 1 (TCH) near Portage la Prairie	PTH 1 (TCH) near St. François Xavier	Assiniboine Trail	1968	current	Former PTH 1 and PTH 4
PTH 26	55	34	PTH 1 in Brandon	Former PTH 4 in Minnedosa		1928	1938	Replaced by PTH 10
PTH 27	3	1.9	PTH 8 north of Winnipeg	PTH 9 / PR 238 north of Winnipeg		1968	current	Former PTH 8A
PTH 27	29	18	Former PTH 26 at Tremaine	Former PTH 4 at Basswood		1928	1966	Section east of Rapid City transferred to PTH 24 in 1956; remainder became part of PR 270 in 1966.
PTH 28	80	50	PTH 1 near Griswold	Former PTH 4 at Shoal Lake		1928	1949	Replaced by PTH 21
PTH 28	10	6.2	Canada–U.S. border near Cartwright	PTH 3 / PR 258 at Cartwright		1959	1980	Replaced by PTH 5
PTH 29	0.5	0.31	Canada–U.S. border near Emerson	PTH 75 near Emerson		1985	2012	Spur of PTH 75; became part of PTH 75 when PTH 75's southern terminus was changed in 2012.
PTH 30	25	16	ND 18 at Canada–U.S. border at Gretna	PTH 14 / PR 332 at Rosenfeld		1968	current	Former PTH 14A
PTH 31	22	14	ND 1 Canada–U.S. border at Windygates	PTH 3 / PR 240 at Darlingford		1959	current	
PTH 31	182	113	Former PTH 4 at Russell	PTH 10 at Swan River		1928	1959	Replaced by PTH 83
PTH 32	23	14	ND 32 at Canada–U.S. border near Rosengart	PTH 14 / PR 428 in Winkler		1957	current	
PTH 34	142	88	ND 20 at Canada–U.S. border near Fallison	PTH 16 (TCH) at Gladstone		1955	current	
PTH 39	164	102	PTH 10 at Simonhouse	PTH 6 at Ponton		1987	current	
PTH 41	69	43	PTH 1 (TCH) / PR 542 at Kirkella	PTH 16 (TCH) / PTH 83 near Binscarth		1956	current	
PTH 41A	56	35	PTH 41 near St. Lazare	Former PTH 4 at Shoal Lake		1956	1968	Former section of PTH 4 (present-day PTH 16) between Birtle and Shoal Lake; replaced by PTH 42
PTH 42	56	35	PTH 41 near St. Lazare	PTH 16 (TCH) at Shoal Lake		1968	current	Former PTH 41A
PTH 44	149	93	PTH 9 at Lockport	PTH 1 (TCH) near West Hawk Lake	Historic Highway No. 1	1968	current	Formerly PTH 1 and PTH 4
PTH 45	106	66	PTH 16 (TCH) / PTH 83 at Russell	PTH 10 north of Erickson	Russell Subdivision Trail	1959	current	
PTH 49	1.5	0.93	Highway 49 at Saskatchewan boundary near Benito	PTH 83 near Benito		1938	current	Former PTH 6
PTH 50	124	77	PTH 5 / PR 361 at McCreary	PTH 16 (TCH) near Westbourne		1953	current	
PTH 52	35	22	PTH 59 near Tourond	PR 210 / PR 302 at La Broquerie		1959	current	
PTH 57	1.5	0.93	Highway 57 at Saskatchewan boundary in the Duck Mountain Provincial Forest	PTH 83 northwest of San Clara		—	—	
PTH 59	221	137	US 59 at Canada–U.S. border near Tolstoi	Victoria Beach		1952	current	Concurrency through Winnipeg with Route 20 (Lagimodière Blvd); section between PR 210 and Winnipeg city limits relocated in 2000 and 2006, former route replaced by PR 210 and series of municipal roads
PTH 59A	6	3.7	PTH 1 in Winnipeg	PTH 59 in St. Boniface	Broadway, Marion Street	1953	1966	Followed Broadway, Main St, St. Mary's Rd, and Marion St. Shortened to only Marion St. when PTH 1 was rerouted in 1958. Replaced by Route 115.
PTH 59B	5	3.1	PTH 4 in Winnipeg	PTH 59 in Winnipeg	Higgins Avenue, Nairn Avenue	1958	1966	Replaced by Route 35 (now Route 37)
PTH 60	152	94	PTH 10 north of Overflowing River	PTH 6 south of Grand Rapids		—	—	
PTH 67	46	29	PTH 6 at La Broquerie near Warren	PTH 9 at Lower Fort Garry		1963	current	
PTH 68	220	140	PTH 5 at Ste. Rose du Lac	PTH 8 at Hnausa	Northern Woods & Water Route	—	—	
PTH 75	101	63	I-29 / US 81 at Canada–U.S. border near Emerson	PTH 100 / Route 42 in Winnipeg	Lord Selkirk Highway	1949	current	Formerly PTH 14; southern terminus relocated in 2012, former route through Emerson replaced by an extension of PR 200
PTH 77	42	26	Highway 3 at Saskatchewan boundary near Westgate	PTH 10 near Baden		1987	current	Formerly PR 277
PTH 80	16	9.9	PTH 83 north of Kenville	PTH 83 north of Benito		—	1939	Eliminated due to the discontinuation of Municipal PTHs; now PR 487
PTH 83	402	250	US 83 at Canada–U.S. border near Lena	PTH 10 at Swan River		1953	current	
PTH 83A	4.1	2.5	Business route through Swan River			1953	current	Former PTH 83
PTH 89	10	6.2	MN 89 at Canada–U.S. border near Piney	PTH 12 / PR 203 near Piney		—	—	
PTH 100 (TCH)	40	25	Beltway around Winnipeg (south of PTH 1)		• Perimeter Highway • Trans-Canada Highway	1955	current	
PTH 101	50	31	Beltway around Winnipeg (north of PTH 1)		Perimeter Highway	1955	current	
PTH 110	14	8.7	PTH 10 south of Brandon	PTH 1 (TCH) east of Brandon	Brandon Eastern Access Route	1995	current	
PTH 190	10	6.2	PTH 101 near Winnipeg	Route 25 / Route 90 in Winnipeg	CentrePort Canada Way	2013	current	
Former

== Secondary routes ==
These Provincial Roads are numbered from 200 to 596. Some of these routes are gravel for part or all of their length. The speed limit is generally 80 to 100 km/h (50 to 60 mph).

Route	From	To	Length
Manitoba Provincial Road 200	PTH 100 in Winnipeg	PTH 75 at Emerson	101 km (63 mi)
Manitoba Provincial Road 201	PTH 89 near Piney	PR 242 in Snowflake	218 km (135 mi)
Manitoba Provincial Road 202	PTH 59 near Birds Hill	PR 204 near Lockport	14.6 km (9.1 mi)
Manitoba Provincial Road 203	PTH 12 / PR 404	PTH 12 / PTH 89	46.4 km (28.8 mi)
Manitoba Provincial Road 204	Route 42 in northern Winnipeg	PTH 9A in Selkirk	29.9 km (18.6 mi)
Manitoba Provincial Road 205	PTH 3 near Sperling	PTH 12 south of Steinbach	84.9 km (52.8 mi)
Manitoba Provincial Road 206	PTH 44 near Kirkness	PTH 52 near Randolph	62.4 km (38.8 mi)
Manitoba Provincial Road 207	PR 213	PTH 1	57.9 km (36.0 mi)
Manitoba Provincial Road 209	PTH 59 near Tolstoi	PR 201	14.1 km (8.8 mi)
Manitoba Provincial Road 210	PTH 75 near St. Adolphe	PTH 12 near Piney	117 km (73 mi)
Manitoba Provincial Road 211	PTH 11	Pinawa	14 km (8.7 mi)
Manitoba Provincial Road 212	PR 204 in Selkirk	PR 213	22.7 km (14.1 mi)
Manitoba Provincial Road 213	PTH 59	PTH 12	24 km (15 mi)
Manitoba Provincial Road 214	PTH 11	PTH 44 near Seddons Corner	26 km (16 mi)
Manitoba Provincial Road 215	PTH 12	PTH 44 near Beausejour	10.1 km (6.3 mi)
Manitoba Provincial Road 216	PR 311 near New Bothwell	PTH 59 near Rosa	40.8 km (25.4 mi)
Manitoba Provincial Road 217	PR 246 near St. Jean Baptiste	PR 218	27.8 km (17.3 mi)
Manitoba Provincial Road 218	PTH 59 near St. Malo	PR 200 near Emerson	45.5 km (28.3 mi)
Manitoba Provincial Road 220	PTH 8 north of Winnipeg	Oak Hammock Marsh north of PTH 67	21.4 km (13.3 mi)
Manitoba Provincial Road 221	PTH 190 near Winnipeg	PR 248	37 km (23 mi)
Manitoba Provincial Road 222	PTH 9 / PR 231 in Gimli	PR 329 near Riverton	42.6 km (26.5 mi)
Manitoba Provincial Road 224	PTH 17 / PR 325 near Hodgson	Fisher Bay on Lake Winnipeg	44.6 km (27.7 mi)
Manitoba Provincial Road 225	PTH 8 near Dunnottar	PR 232 in Dunnottar	6.2 km (3.9 mi)
Manitoba Provincial Road 227	PTH 16 near Westbourne	PTH 6 in Warren	72.0 km (44.7 mi)
Manitoba Provincial Road 229	PTH 6 in Clarkleigh	PTH 9 in Winnipeg Beach	81.3 km (50.5 mi)
Manitoba Provincial Road 230	PTH 8 near St. Andrews Airport	PTH 9 in Selkirk	10.5 km (6.5 mi)
Manitoba Provincial Road 231	PTH 17 in Narcisse	PTH 9 / PR 222 in Gimli	41.9 km (26.0 mi)
Manitoba Provincial Road 232	PTH 9 near Dunnottar	PTH 9 in Winnipeg Beach	9.9 km (6.2 mi)
Manitoba Provincial Road 233	PR 325 near Fisherton	PTH 68 near Arborg	63.9 km (39.7 mi)
Manitoba Provincial Road 234	PTH 8 near Riverton	Cable ferry to Matheson Island	92.6 km (57.5 mi)
Manitoba Provincial Road 236	PTH 6 near Gordon	PTH 7 near Balmoral	34.5 km (21.4 mi)
Manitoba Provincial Road 237	Watchorn Provincial Park	Spearhill	20.3 km (12.6 mi)
Manitoba Provincial Road 238	PTH 9 / PTH 27 near Parkdale	PTH 44 in Lockport	10.1 km (6.3 mi)
Manitoba Provincial Road 239	PTH 6	Steep Rock	32.3 km (20.1 mi)
Manitoba Provincial Road 240	PTH 3 / PTH 31 at Darlingford	Delta Beach	122.8 km (76.3 mi)
Manitoba Provincial Road 241	PR 334 at Headingley	PTH 100 in Winnipeg	5.3 km (3.3 mi)
Manitoba Provincial Road 242	US Border (Hannah-Snowflake)	Lake Manitoba	157 km (98 mi)
Manitoba Provincial Road 243	PTH 75 near Emerson	PTH 32 near Reinland	53 km (33 mi)
Manitoba Provincial Road 244	PTH 3 in Manitou	PTH 2 in Rathwell	46.2 km (28.7 mi)
Manitoba Provincial Road 245	PR 342 near Cypress River	PTH 3 / PTH 13 in Carman	90.2 km (56.0 mi)
Manitoba Provincial Road 246	PR 200	PTH 75 near St Jean Baptiste	36.4 km (22.6 mi)
Manitoba Provincial Road 247	PTH 2 in Elm Creek	PTH 75 in Howden	68.2 km (42.4 mi)
Manitoba Provincial Road 248	PR 305 near Brunkild	PTH 6 near Woodlands	76.1 km (47.3 mi)
Manitoba Provincial Road 250	PTH 2 / PTH 22 at Souris	PR 354	134.7 km (83.7 mi)
Manitoba Provincial Road 251	PR 256 near Antler-Lyleton Border Crossing	PTH 21 near Goodlands	55.7 km (34.6 mi)
Manitoba Provincial Road 252	PTH 3 (Boundary Commission Trail) near Elva	PR 345 near Broomhill	24.7 km (15.3 mi)
Manitoba Provincial Road 253	PTH 18 near Killarney	PTH 3 / PTH 34 (Boundary Commission Trail) in Pilot Mound	62.9 km (39.1 mi)
Manitoba Provincial Road 254	PR 251 near Goodlands	PR 259 near Virden	118.7 km (73.8 mi)
Manitoba Provincial Road 255	Township Road 92 at Saskatchewan border near Ebor	PR 254 near Oak Lake Beach	52.7 km (32.7 mi)
Manitoba Provincial Road 256	North Dakota Highway 256 (ND 256) at US Border (Antler-Lyleton)	PTH 41 near McAuley	160 km (99 mi)
Manitoba Provincial Road 257	Saskatchewan border (Saskatchewan Highway 48)	PTH 1 near Virden	37.3 km (23.2 mi)
Manitoba Provincial Road 259	PTH 1 near Virden	PR 250 near Wheatland	64.2 km (39.9 mi)
Manitoba Provincial Road 260	PTH 16 (Yellowhead Highway) near Gladstone	PR 261 near Waldersee	40.9 km (25.4 mi)
Manitoba Provincial Road 261	PTH 5 near Riding Mountain	Dead end at Lake Manitoba	61.0 km (37.9 mi)
Manitoba Provincial Road 262	PTH 10 / PTH 24 at Tremaine	PTH 10 / PR 354 at Onanole	76.4 km (47.5 mi)
Manitoba Provincial Road 264	PTH 24 near Crandall	PTH 83	119.2 km (74.1 mi)
Manitoba Provincial Road 265	PR 262 north of Clanwilliam	PTH 50 at Langruth	80.6 km (50.1 mi)
Manitoba Provincial Road 266	PTH 10 in Bowsman	PR 268 in Birch River	14.9 km (9.3 mi)
Manitoba Provincial Road 267	PR 274 near Venlaw	PTH 20 (NWWR) near Sifton	32.6 km (20.3 mi)
Manitoba Provincial Road 268	PTH 10 near Minitonas	PTH 10 near Birch River	44.7 km (27.8 mi)
Manitoba Provincial Road 269	PTH 10 near Ethelbert	PR 276 near Meadow Portage	72.8 km (45.2 mi)
Manitoba Provincial Road 270	PTH 1 near Brandon	PR 354 near Onanole	86.3 km (53.6 mi)
Manitoba Provincial Road 271	PTH 10 at Pine River	PTH 20 near Camperville	32.2 km (20.0 mi)
Manitoba Provincial Road 272	PTH 20 near Camperville	Duck Bay	21.4 km (13.3 mi)
Manitoba Provincial Road 273	PTH 10	Ukraina	7.1 km (4.4 mi)
Manitoba Provincial Road 274	PTH 10 / PTH 10A at Ethelbert	PTH 5 / PTH 10 west of Dauphin	91.6 km (56.9 mi)
Manitoba Provincial Road 275	Saskatchewan border (Saskatchewan Highway 753)	PTH 10A in Swan River	23.2 km (14.4 mi)
Manitoba Provincial Road 276	PTH 5 (Northern Woods and Water Route) in Ste. Rose du Lac	Skownan	114.3 km (71.0 mi)
Manitoba Provincial Road 278	PTH 50 at Silver Ridge	PTH 68 near Eddystone	41.8 km (26.0 mi)
Manitoba Provincial Road 279	PTH 10 near Bowsman	Whitefish Lake Provincial Park within the Porcupine Provincial Forest	32.1 km (19.9 mi)
Manitoba Provincial Road 280	PR 391	Gillam	181 km (112 mi)
Manitoba Provincial Road 282	PR 283	PTH 10 near Westray	23.8 km (14.8 mi)
Manitoba Provincial Road 283	Saskatchewan border (Saskatchewan Highway 9)	PTH 10 near The Pas	39.5 km (24.5 mi)
Manitoba Provincial Road 285	PTH 10 in The Pas	Saskatchewan River	14.4 km (8.9 mi)
Manitoba Provincial Road 287	PTH 10 at Clearwater Lake Provincial Park	Cormorant	57.8 km (35.9 mi)
Manitoba Provincial Road 289	PR 285 in The Pas	The Pas/Grace Lake Airport	3.8 km (2.4 mi)
Manitoba Provincial Road 290	PR 280 at Long Spruce Generating Station	Sundance	24.9 km (15.5 mi)
Manitoba Provincial Road 291	PTH 10 near Flin Flon	PTH 10A in Flin Flon	4.5 km (2.8 mi)
Manitoba Provincial Road 301	PTH 1 in Falcon Lake	PTH 44 near West Hawk Lake	11.5 km (7.1 mi)
Manitoba Provincial Road 302	PR 201 near Vita	PTH 44 near Beausejour	68.6 km (42.6 mi)
Manitoba Provincial Road 303	PTH 12 near Friedensfeld	PR 302 near La Broquerie	13 km (8.1 mi)
Manitoba Provincial Road 304	PTH 12 / PTH 59 / PR 500 near Beaconia	PR 314 near Bissett	192 km (119 mi)
Manitoba Provincial Road 305	PTH 1 / PTH 16 (Yellowhead Highway) near Portage la Prairie	PTH 59 near Tourond	151.8 km (94.3 mi)
Manitoba Provincial Road 306	PR 243 near Rosetown	PTH 23 near Kane	36.1 km (22.4 mi)
Manitoba Provincial Road 307	PTH 11	PTH 44 near Rennie	48.4 km (30.1 mi)
Manitoba Provincial Road 308	PTH 12 near Sprague	PTH 1 near East Braintree	101.5 km (63.1 mi)
Manitoba Provincial Road 309	PR 307 in Whiteshell Provincial Park	Big Whiteshell Lake	12.2 km (7.6 mi)
Manitoba Provincial Road 310	PTH 12 near South Junction	Minnesota State Highway 310 at US Border (Roseau-South Junction Border Crossing)	4.2 km (2.6 mi)
Manitoba Provincial Road 311	PR 200	PR 302 east of Giroux	49 km (30 mi)
Manitoba Provincial Road 312	PTH 44 in Whiteshell Provincial Park	Ingolf, Ontario	5.5 km (3.4 mi)
Manitoba Provincial Road 313	PTH 11 near Lac du Bonnet	Pointe du Bois	40 km (25 mi)
Manitoba Provincial Road 314	PR 304 near Bissett	PR 315 in Nopiming Provincial Park	73 km (45 mi)
Manitoba Provincial Road 315	PR 313 at Pinawa Bay	Werner Lake Road at Ontario border in Nopiming Provincial Park	59 km (37 mi)
Manitoba Provincial Road 317	Libau	PR 502 in Lac du Bonnet	50.3 km (31.3 mi)
Manitoba Provincial Road 319	PTH 59 near Scanterbury	Patricia Beach Provincial Park	6.0 km (3.7 mi)
Manitoba Provincial Road 320	PTH 9A in Selkirk	Netley Creek Provincial Park	18.0 km (11.2 mi)
Manitoba Provincial Road 321	PTH 6 in Grosse Isle	PTH 8 near Parkdale	31.9 km (19.8 mi)
Manitoba Provincial Road 322	PTH 6 in Grosse Isle	PR 415 near Erinview	41.6 km (25.8 mi)
Manitoba Provincial Road 323	PTH 6 near Woodlands	PTH 7 near Stonewall	26.5 km (16.5 mi)
Manitoba Provincial Road 324	PTH 8	PR 222 near Camp Morton	1.6 km (0.99 mi)
Manitoba Provincial Road 325	PTH 68 in Oakview	PR 234 near Washow Bay	129.0 km (80.2 mi)
Manitoba Provincial Road 326	PR 233 near Vidir	PTH 68 in Arborg	22.9 km (14.2 mi)
Manitoba Provincial Road 327	PTH 60 near Chemawawin	Easterville	12.7 km (7.9 mi)
Manitoba Provincial Road 328	PR 276 in Waterhen	PTH 6 near Gypsumville	63.5 km (39.5 mi)
Manitoba Provincial Road 329	PTH 17 near Broad Valley	Dead end at Sandy Bar Beach on Lake Winnipeg	47.6 km (29.6 mi)
Manitoba Provincial Road 330	PTH 75 near Morris	PTH 100 near Winnipeg	46.4 km (28.8 mi)
Manitoba Provincial Road 331	PR 240 near Portage la Prairie	PTH 13 at Oakville	19.2 km (11.9 mi)
Manitoba Provincial Road 332	PTH 14 / PTH 30 in Rosenfeld	PTH 1 in Dacotah	87.2 km (54.2 mi)
Manitoba Provincial Road 334	PR 330 near Domain	PR 221 near Rosser	55.4 km (34.4 mi)
Manitoba Provincial Road 336	PTH 23 near Kane	PTH 3 / PR 205 in Sperling	16.4 km (10.2 mi)
Manitoba Provincial Road 338	PTH 23 in Miami	PR 305 near Haywood	25.0 km (15.5 mi)
Manitoba Provincial Road 340	PTH 2 near Wawanesa	PTH 1 near Douglas	40.1 km (24.9 mi)
Manitoba Provincial Road 341	PTH 10 near the International Peace Garden	PTH 18 in Lena	33.9 km (21.1 mi)
Manitoba Provincial Road 342	PTH 3A in Clearwater	PTH 2 in Cypress River	57.2 km (35.5 mi)
Manitoba Provincial Road 343	PR 448 north of Whitewater Lake	PTH 10 north of Boissevain	18.1 km (11.2 mi)
Manitoba Provincial Road 344	PTH 2 (Red Coat Trail) near Wawanesa	PR 340 in Wawanesa	6.1 km (3.8 mi)
Manitoba Provincial Road 345	Saskatchewan border (Saskatchewan Highway 361)	PTH 21 north of Dand	65.6 km (40.8 mi)
Manitoba Provincial Road 346	PTH 3 near Ninga	PTH 2 (Red Coat Trail) at Nesbitt	50.5 km (31.4 mi)
Manitoba Provincial Road 347	PTH 2 (Red Coat Trail) near Souris	PTH 22 near Souris	21.5 km (13.4 mi)
Manitoba Provincial Road 348	PTH 2 (Red Coat Trail) near Carroll	PR 349 near Brandon	13.1 km (8.1 mi)
Manitoba Provincial Road 349	PR 250 near Beresford	PTH 10 near Brandon	22.2 km (13.8 mi)
Manitoba Provincial Road 350	PR 242 near Lavenham	PTH 16 (Yellowhead Highway) at Woodside	55.2 km (34.3 mi)
Manitoba Provincial Road 351	PTH 1 near Camp Hughes	PTH 1 west of Sidney	37.3 km (23.2 mi)
Manitoba Provincial Road 352	PTH 34 near Arizona	PTH 5 near Birnie	92.6 km (57.5 mi)
Manitoba Provincial Road 353	PTH 10	PTH 5	34.4 km (21.4 mi)
Manitoba Provincial Road 354	CNR main line near Bradwardine	PTH 10 / PR 262 at Onanole	108.9 km (67.7 mi)
Manitoba Provincial Road 355	Birdtail Sioux First Nation	PTH 16A in Minnedosa	98.2 km (61.0 mi)
Manitoba Provincial Road 357	PTH 10 near Erickson	PTH 5 near Birnie	34.9 km (21.7 mi)
Manitoba Provincial Road 359	PTH 16 / PTH 41 / PTH 83 near Binscarth	PR 264 near Rossburn	35.9 km (22.3 mi)
Manitoba Provincial Road 360	PTH 5 / PR 480 near Laurier	PTH 5 near Ste. Rose du Lac	30.4 km (18.9 mi)
Manitoba Provincial Road 361	PTH 5 / PTH 50 at McCreary	Riding Mountain National Park	7.2 km (4.5 mi)
Manitoba Provincial Road 362	PTH 5A / PTH 10A in Dauphin	PR 267 in Sifton	29.0 km (18.0 mi)
Manitoba Provincial Road 363	Saskatchewan border (Saskatchewan Highway 5)	PTH 83	8.9 km (5.5 mi)
Manitoba Provincial Road 364	PTH 20 near Winnipegosis	PR 276 near Rorketon	54.3 km (33.7 mi)
Manitoba Provincial Road 365	PTH 10 near Birch River	North Steeprock Lake Provincial Park	29.7 km (18.5 mi)
Manitoba Provincial Road 366	PTH 83 near Inglis	PR 266 at Bowsman	219 km (136 mi)
Manitoba Provincial Road 367	PTH 83 near San Clara	PTH 10	84 km (52 mi)
Manitoba Provincial Road 373	PTH 6 in Pipun	Norway House	109 km (68 mi)
Manitoba Provincial Road 374	PR 373 in Jenpeg	Cross Lake	23 km (14 mi)
Manitoba Provincial Road 375	PTH 6	Paint Lake Provincial Park	4 km (2.5 mi)
Manitoba Provincial Road 384	PR 287 at Clearwater Lake Provincial Park	Moose Lake	39.3 km (24.4 mi)
Manitoba Provincial Road 391	PTH 6/PR 280 in Thompson	PR 396 / PR 397 in Lynn Lake	201 km (125 mi)
Manitoba Provincial Road 392	PTH 39	Snow Lake	33.1 km (20.6 mi)
Manitoba Provincial Road 393	PR 392 in Snow Lake	Osborne Lake Mine	19.0 km (11.8 mi)
Manitoba Provincial Road 394	PR 391 in Lynn Lake	Saskatchewan boundary (Saskatchewan Highway 994)	59.7 km (37.1 mi)
Manitoba Provincial Road 395	PR 392 in Snow Lake	Chisel Lake Mine	13.1 km (8.1 mi)
Manitoba Provincial Road 396	PR 391 / PR 397 in Lynn Lake	Fox Mine	48.0 km (29.8 mi)
Manitoba Provincial Road 397	PR 391 / PR 396 in Lynn Lake	Eldon Lake	2.8 km (1.7 mi)
Manitoba Provincial Road 398	PR 394 near Lynn Lake	Burge Lake Provincial Park	1.7 km (1.1 mi)
Manitoba Provincial Road 399	Dead end at former mine	PR 391 in Lynn Lake	0.5 km (0.31 mi)
Manitoba Provincial Road 403	PTH 59 in St. Malo	PTH 12 near Zhoda	25.5 km (15.8 mi)
Manitoba Provincial Road 404	PTH 12 in Sandilands Provincial Forest	PR 210 near Marchand Provincial Park	23.9 km (14.9 mi)
Manitoba Provincial Road 405	PTH 59 in Île-des-Chênes	PR 206 near Lorette	15.5 km (9.6 mi)
Manitoba Provincial Road 406	PTH 15 near Elma	PTH 11 / PTH 44 near Whitemouth	8.7 km (5.4 mi)
Manitoba Provincial Road 408	PTH 11 near Oldenburg	PR 307 in Seven Sisters Falls	13.5 km (8.4 mi)
Manitoba Provincial Road 409	PTH 101	PR 220	4.7 km (2.9 mi)
Manitoba Provincial Road 410	PR 230 in Rossdale	PR 238 at St. Andrews Rectory National Historic Site	3.3 km (2.1 mi)
Manitoba Provincial Road 411	PR 430 in St. Ambroise	PTH 6 (NWWR) near Woodlands	22.9 km (14.2 mi)
Manitoba Provincial Road 412	PR 224 in Dallas	Jackhead	63 km (39 mi)
Manitoba Provincial Road 415	PTH 6 in St. Laurent	PTH 7 in Teulon	60.3 km (37.5 mi)
Manitoba Provincial Road 416	PR 415 near Harperville	PTH 17 / PR 229 in Inwood	12.5 km (7.8 mi)
Manitoba Provincial Road 417	PTH 6 / PTH 68 in Eriksdale	Lake Manitoba First Nation	24.8 km (15.4 mi)
Manitoba Provincial Road 418	PR 419 near Lundar Beach Provincial Park	PR 417 near Eriksdale	14.7 km (9.1 mi)
Manitoba Provincial Road 419	PTH 17 near Chatfield	Lundar Beach Provincial Park	62.0 km (38.5 mi)
Manitoba Provincial Road 421	PTH 30 near Altona	PTH 75 near Emerson	20.5 km (12.7 mi)
Manitoba Provincial Road 422	PTH 23 near Morris	PR 205 in Rosenort	11.6 km (7.2 mi)
Manitoba Provincial Road 423	PTH 3 / PTH 34 / PTH 3A in Crystal City	PR 242 near Snowflake	19.7 km (12.2 mi)
Manitoba Provincial Road 424	PTH 2 near Springstein	PR 248 near St. Eustache	34.5 km (21.4 mi)
Manitoba Provincial Road 425	PR 334 in Headingleay	PTH 101 in Winnipeg	6.0 km (3.7 mi)
Manitoba Provincial Road 426	PR 201 in St. Joseph	PTH 14	6.5 km (4.0 mi)
Manitoba Provincial Road 427	PR 424	PTH 100	12.8 km (8.0 mi)
Manitoba Provincial Road 428	PTH 14 / PTH 32 in Winkler	PTH 23 near Roland	18.3 km (11.4 mi)
Manitoba Provincial Road 430	PTH 1 / PTH 13	St. Ambroise Beach Provincial Park	38.8 km (24.1 mi)
Manitoba Provincial Road 432	PR 201 near Windygates	PTH 23 in Rosebank	37.1 km (23.1 mi)
Manitoba Provincial Road 433	PR 313 near town of Lac du Bonnet	dead end at Cape Coppermine Marina	14.8 km (9.2 mi)
Manitoba Provincial Road 435	PTH 59 near East Selkirk	PR 214 near Milner Ridge Correctional Centre	38.8 km (24.1 mi)
Manitoba Provincial Road 440	PTH 23 near Mariapolis	PR 253 near Pilot Mound	19.1 km (11.9 mi)
Manitoba Provincial Road 442	PR 342 near Clearwater	PTH 3 near Mather	19.2 km (11.9 mi)
Manitoba Provincial Road 443	PTH 10 in Boissevain	PR 346 in Ninga	13.3 km (8.3 mi)
Manitoba Provincial Road 444	PR 343 near Croll	PTH 23 near Fairfax	11.5 km (7.1 mi)
Manitoba Provincial Road 445	PR 256 between Pierson and Tilston	PTH 3 / PTH 83 in Melita	19.2 km (11.9 mi)
Manitoba Provincial Road 448	PTH 23 in Elgin	PTH 10 near Boissevain	34.5 km (21.4 mi)
Manitoba Provincial Road 449	PTH 34 in Holland	PR 245 near Notre Dame de Lourdes	16.3 km (10.1 mi)
Manitoba Provincial Road 450	PTH 3	Lake Metigoshe	31.9 km (19.8 mi)
Manitoba Provincial Road 452	PTH 83 near Melita	PR 251 in Waskada	36.4 km (22.6 mi)
Manitoba Provincial Road 453	PTH 10 south of Brandon	PR 340 near Criddle/Vane Homestead Provincial Park	24.6 km (15.3 mi)
Manitoba Provincial Road 455	PTH 21	PR 250 near Alexander	11.6 km (7.2 mi)
Manitoba Provincial Road 457	PTH 1A in Brandon	PR 340 in Cottonwoods	16.7 km (10.4 mi)
Manitoba Provincial Road 458	PTH 3 near Holmfield	PTH 23 near Belmont	38.9 km (24.2 mi)
Manitoba Provincial Road 459	PTH 1 at Grand Valley Provincial Park	PTH 10 in Brandon	9.5 km (5.9 mi)
Manitoba Provincial Road 462	PR 265 near Plumas	PTH 5 near McCreary	57.9 km (36.0 mi)
Manitoba Provincial Road 463	PR 254	PTH 21	3.8 km (2.4 mi)
Manitoba Provincial Road 464	PTH 1	PTH 16 near Neepawa	37.8 km (23.5 mi)
Manitoba Provincial Road 465	PR 262	PR 464	24.0 km (14.9 mi)
Manitoba Provincial Road 466	PR 465	PTH 16 near Franklin	10.0 km (6.2 mi)
Manitoba Provincial Road 467	PTH 41 near Manson	PTH 83 near Miniota	29.5 km (18.3 mi)
Manitoba Provincial Road 468	PR 457 near Chater	PR 353 near Moore Park	23.0 km (14.3 mi)
Manitoba Provincial Road 469	PR 264	PTH 21 at Hamiota	13.1 km (8.1 mi)
Manitoba Provincial Road 470	PR 566 near Menzie	PR 250	25.1 km (15.6 mi)
Manitoba Provincial Road 471	PR 262 near Clanwilliam	PTH 5 near Neepawa	23.8 km (14.8 mi)
Manitoba Provincial Road 472	PTH 42	PTH 16 near Solsgirth	9.1 km (5.7 mi)
Manitoba Provincial Road 474	PTH 24 near Arrow River	PR 355 in Isabella	15.9 km (9.9 mi)
Manitoba Provincial Road 475	PTH 41	PTH 16 / PTH 83 at Foxwarren	8.8 km (5.5 mi)
Manitoba Provincial Road 476	PTH 16 near Solsgirth	PR 264 near Silver Beach	36.2 km (22.5 mi)
Manitoba Provincial Road 478	Saskatchewan border (Hwy 22)	PR 264 near Cracknell	51.9 km (32.2 mi)
Manitoba Provincial Road 480	PTH 5 / PR 360 near Laurier	PTH 5 near Makinak	29.4 km (18.3 mi)
Manitoba Provincial Road 481	PR 364 in Weiden	PTH 68 in Eddystone	94.2 km (58.5 mi)
Manitoba Provincial Road 482	PTH 5 / Hwy 10 near Saskatchewan border	PTH 83 near Inglis	46.5 km (28.9 mi)
Manitoba Provincial Road 483	PTH 10	Pelican Rapids	27.3 km (17.0 mi)
Manitoba Provincial Road 484	PR 363	PTH 5 near Roblin	24.5 km (15.2 mi)
Manitoba Provincial Road 485	PR 486	PR 366	10.1 km (6.3 mi)
Manitoba Provincial Road 486	PTH 83 near Durban	PTH 83 near Swan River	28.7 km (17.8 mi)
Manitoba Provincial Road 487	PTH 83 near Benito	PTH 83 near Kenville	25.3 km (15.7 mi)
Manitoba Provincial Road 488	PR 486	PTH 10	21.7 km (13.5 mi)
Manitoba Provincial Road 489	PTH 20 near Camperville	PR 271 in Pulp River	22.6 km (14.0 mi)
Manitoba Provincial Road 490	PR 481	PR 269	8 km (5.0 mi)
Manitoba Provincial Road 491	PR 362 near Valley River	Trembowla	9.1 km (5.7 mi)
Manitoba Provincial Road 493	PR 391 in Leaf Rapids	South Indian Lake	97.3 km (60.5 mi)
Manitoba Provincial Road 500	PTH 12 / PTH 59 / PR 304 near Beaconia	PTH 12 near Grand Marais	11.0 km (6.8 mi)
Manitoba Provincial Road 501	PTH 1 near Rosewood	Ross	26.0 km (16.2 mi)
Manitoba Provincial Road 502	PTH 11 in Lac du Bonnet	PR 313 near Lac du Bonnet	5.6 km (3.5 mi)
Manitoba Provincial Road 503	PR 308 near East Braintree	PTH 1 near Hadashville	34.6 km (21.5 mi)
Manitoba Provincial Road 504	PTH 59 near Victoria Beach	dead end at Lake Winnipeg	2.3 km (1.4 mi)
Manitoba Provincial Road 505	PR 503 in Sandilands Provincial Forest	Dead end at Whitemouth River	5.2 km (3.2 mi)
Manitoba Provincial Road 506	PTH 11 near Elma	PTH 1 in Prawda	22.4 km (13.9 mi)
Manitoba Provincial Road 507	PTH 11 near Hadashville	PR 506	4.0 km (2.5 mi)
Manitoba Provincial Road 508	PR 212 in East Selkirk	PTH 59 near East Selkirk	12.9 km (8.0 mi)
Manitoba Provincial Road 509	PR 204 near East Selkirk	PTH 59 near East Selkirk	1.6 km (0.99 mi)
Manitoba Provincial Road 512	PTH 68	PR 419 near Chatfield	15.4 km (9.6 mi)
Manitoba Provincial Road 513	PTH 6 near St. Martin Junction	Dauphin River	50.7 km (31.5 mi)
Manitoba Provincial Road 518	PTH 6 in Woodlands	PR 415	23.3 km (14.5 mi)
Manitoba Provincial Road 519	PTH 8 near Sandy Hook	PTH 9 in Sandy Hook	2.8 km (1.7 mi)
Manitoba Provincial Road 520	PR 211 in Pinawa	PR 313	14.1 km (8.8 mi)
Manitoba Provincial Road 521	PTH 32 near Rosengart	PR 243 at Reinland	5.5 km (3.4 mi)
Manitoba Provincial Road 524	PR 243 near Gretna	Blumenort South	4.5 km (2.8 mi)
Manitoba Provincial Road 525	PR 308	US border	10.2 km (6.3 mi)
Manitoba Provincial Road 528	PTH 3 (Boundary Commission Trail)	Kaleida	8.2 km (5.1 mi)
Manitoba Provincial Road 530	Dead end at Souris River near Treesbank	PTH 2 near Stockton	7.3 km (4.5 mi)
Manitoba Provincial Road 532	PTH 23 near Saint Alphonse	PR 245 near Saint Alphonse	11.6 km (7.2 mi)
Manitoba Provincial Road 541	PTH 21 near Hartney	PR 254	6.5 km (4.0 mi)
Manitoba Provincial Road 542	PR 257 near Kola	PTH 1 / PTH 41 near Kirkella	21.2 km (13.2 mi)
Manitoba Provincial Road 543	PTH 21	PR 254	11.5 km (7.1 mi)
Manitoba Provincial Road 545	Saskatchewan border (near Rocanville Potash Mine)	PTH 41	5.5 km (3.4 mi)
Manitoba Provincial Road 547	Saskatchewan border (Saskatchewan Highway 381)	PR 482	3.2 km (2.0 mi)
Manitoba Provincial Road 549	Saskatchewan border	PR 482	4.2 km (2.6 mi)
Manitoba Provincial Road 564	PTH 21 in Sioux Valley Dakota Nation	PR 259 near Bradwardine	14.7 km (9.1 mi)
Manitoba Provincial Road 566	PTH 45 in Menzie	PR 577 near Olha	22.1 km (13.7 mi)
Manitoba Provincial Road 567	PTH 50	Whitemud River	7.5 km (4.7 mi)
Manitoba Provincial Road 568	PTH 83 near Birtle	PTH 42 near St. Lazare	20.3 km (12.6 mi)
Manitoba Provincial Road 569	PTH 50	Lake Manitoba	5.7 km (3.5 mi)
Manitoba Provincial Road 571	Saskatchewan border (Saskatchewan Highway 308)	PTH 41	6.4 km (4.0 mi)
Manitoba Provincial Road 575	PR 260 near Waldersee	Tenby	6.5 km (4.0 mi)
Manitoba Provincial Road 577	PR 264 near Rossburn	PTH 45 / PTH 21 at Oakburn	37.7 km (23.4 mi)
Manitoba Provincial Road 579	PTH 16 / PTH 83 near Russell	PR 478 near Saskatchewan border	26.1 km (16.2 mi)
Manitoba Provincial Road 582	PTH 5 / PTH 20 in Ochre River	PR 480 in Makinak	16.4 km (10.2 mi)
Manitoba Provincial Road 583	PTH 83 near Roblin	PTH 5 near Bield	14.8 km (9.2 mi)
Manitoba Provincial Road 584	PR 366 in Petlura	PR 594 near Zelena	73.4 km (45.6 mi)
Manitoba Provincial Road 588	PR 275 near Big Woody	PR 279 south of Porcupine Provincial Forest	13.0 km (8.1 mi)
Manitoba Provincial Road 591	PTH 5	PR 584	3.9 km (2.4 mi)
Manitoba Provincial Road 592	PR 366 in Inglis	PR 583 near Roblin	26.3 km (16.3 mi)
Manitoba Provincial Road 593	PTH 83 near Roblin	PR 484 near Deepdale	12.9 km (8.0 mi)
Manitoba Provincial Road 594	PTH 83 near Zelena	PR 367 near Boggy Creek	19.5 mi (31.4 km)
Manitoba Provincial Road 596	PTH 39	Wekusko	5 km (3.1 mi)

== Former secondary routes ==
- PR 208 (PTH 12 in Zhoda to PR 201 east of Vita) — became part of PR 302 in 1985-1986.
- PR 209 (Section) — Section from PTH 59 to PR 200 decommissioned during the 1992 Great Decommissioning, with the section south and west of PR 218 becoming part of PR 218. Rest now Road 5N.
- PR 219 (PTH 59 to Saint Georges) — rerouted directly to PR 304 in 1976 and became part of PR 304 in 1977.
- PR 223 (PTH 7 to PTH 9 in Lower Fort Garry) — became part of PTH 67 in 1983.
- PR 224 (Section) — Section to Fisher Branch became part of PR 228 in 1979, and then PTH 17 in 1983.
- PR 226 (PTH 8 to PR 233) — became part of PR 233 during the 1992 Great Decommissioning.
- PR 228 (PTH 8 to Hodgson) — section from PTH 7 to PR 325 was redesignated as PTH 17 in 1983. Remainder became part of PTH 17 in 1987.
- PR 233 (Section) — Section from PR 226 east to PR 326 became part of PR 326 and section from PR 326 north three blocks, east three block, north three blocks, and east to PR 234 decommissioned during the 1992 Great Decommissioning. Section south and east of PR 234 became part of PTH 8 in 1987 and the concurrency with PR 234 was dropped.
- PR 234 (Section) — Section from PTH 329 to then-PTH 233 became part of PTH 8 in 1987.
- PR 235 (Sainte Rose du Lac to PTH 6) — became part of PTH 68 in 1987.
- PR 241 (Lido Plague Road to PR 334 near Headingley) — decommissioned in 2013.
- PR 249 (Macdonald to west of Poplar Point) — Decommissioned during the 1992 Great Decommissioning. Now Main Street and Road 71N.
- PR 256 (Section) — Section from PR 251 (This section now decommissioned) directly northward deleted in 1973 and rerouted on a route 2 miles east.
- PR 258 (Neepawa to Cartwright) — became part of PTH 5 in 1980.
- PR 260 (Section) — Section from PR 261 to PTH 50 at Alonsa decommissioned during the 1992 Great Decommissioning.
- PR 262 (Section) — Section from PR 263 near Scandinavia east and north to Riding Mountain National Park decommissioned during the 1992 Great Decommissioning.
- PR 263 (PR 262 near Scandinavia to Riding Mountain National Park) — Decommissioned during the 1992 Great Decommissioning with parts being transferred to PR 262 and PR 270 (this is PR 354 after 1997), and rest in now Reid Road.
- PR 270 (Section) — Section east to PTH 10 transferred to PTH 354 in 1997.
- PR 277 (Saskatchewan boundary to Baden) — Changed to PTH 77 in 1987.
- PR 300 — Decommissioned in 2020. Route was never signed. Now St. Anne's Road and Hallama Drive.
- PR 303 (Section) — Section west to PR 200 decommissioned during the 1992 Great Decommissioning. Now Ridge Road, PR 216, and Road 34N (College Avenue and Otterburne Road).
- PR 306 (first use) (PTH 15 to north of Garson Station) — Decommissioned during the 1992 Great Decommissioning. Now Dundee–Garson Road.
- PR 316 (PTH 44 to PR 317) — Decommissioned during the 1992 Great Decommissioning. Now Road 48E/Allegra Road.
- PR 318 (PR 303 (now Road 34 North) to PR 311) — Decommissioned during the 1992 Great Decommissioning. Now Loeppky Road.
- PR 336 (section) (From PTH 3 and PR 205 in Sperling to PR 305) — Now 336 Road in Rural Municipality of Morris and Road 11W in Rural Municipality of Macdonald
- PR 344 (first use) (Brandon to PTH 23 south of Dunrea) — Decommissioned during the 1992 Great Decommissioning. Now 65 Street E, Road 105W, Road 49N, Road 104W, PR 453 and PR 340, and unnamed roads.
- PR 347 (Section) — Section from then-PR 454 to PR 254 decommissioned during the 1992 Great Decommissioning. Now Road 36N, Road 132W, and Road 33N, PR 541.
- PR 350 (Section) — Section from then-PR 461 south, west, south, and west to PTH 34 decommissioned during the 1992 Great Decommissioning.
- PR 359 (Section) — Section from Vista east to 3 miles east of PR 266, north 2 miles east to PR 354, and north, east, and south to PR 270 decommissioned during the 1992 Great Decommissioning, with the part north, east, and south of PR 354 being transferred to PR 354.
- PR 360 (Sections) — Sections from PTH 50 to PR 480 and from then-PR 581 to PTH 68 decommissioned during the 1992 Great Decommissioning.
- PR 366 (Section) — Section from PTH 10 to PR 268 decommissioned during the 1992 Great Decommissioning. Section from PTH 10 to PR 587 restored in 2007 in exchange for eliminating PR 587 east of there due to a bridge removal. PR 366 extended over the remaining portion of PR 587.
- PR 382 (PR 391 to Thompson Airport) — transferred to PR 391 in 1970.
- PR 391 (Section) — Section west of Thompson transferred to PTH 6 and PTH 39 in 1987.
- PR 392 (Section, PTH 39 to Wekusko) — Renumbered to PR 596 in 1994.
- PR 400 (PTH 23 in Dufrost to PR 217) — Decommissioned during the 1992 Great Decommissioning.
- PR 401 (PR 204 (Henderson Highway) to PR 202 (Birds Hill Road) in Birds Hill) — Decommissioned during the 1992 Great Decommissioning. Now Hoddinott Road.
- PR 402 (PR 201 in Sundown to PTH 12) — Decommissioned during the 1992 Great Decommissioning. Now Road 53E and Sundown Road.
- PR 407 (PR 204 to PR 202) — Decommissioned during the 1992 Great Decommissioning. Now Ludwick Road.
- PR 412 (First use, PTH 26 to PR 227) — Decommissioned during the 1992 Great Decommissioning. Now Meadows Road and Road 6W.
- PR 413 (PTH 7 to PTH 8 in Petersville) — Decommissioned during the 1992 Great Decommissioning. Now Road 87N and Hall Road.
- PR 414 (PR 411 to PTH 6 in Lake Francis) — Decommissioned during the 1992 Great Decommissioning. Now Road 18N.
- PR 420 (PR 247 to PTH 75 in Glenlea) — Decommissioned during the 1992 Great Decommissioning. Now Rochon Road and Glenlea Road.
- PR 424 (Section) — Section from PTH 1 to PR 427 rebuilt to the west. Now Lido Plage Road.
- PR 426 (First use, From Trans-Canada Highway / Yellowhead Highway at Bénard to PR 430 near Poplar Point) — Decommissioned during the Great 1992 Decommissioning. Now Bénard Road (Road 17W) and River Road.
- PR 429 (PR 200 to PTH 59) — Became part of PR 210 in 1985–1986.
- PR 431 (PTH 23 to St. Leon) — Decommissioned during the 1992 Great Decommissioning. Now Chemin Messner.
- PR 434 (PTH 3 to Lake Minnewasta) — Decommissioned in 2002–2003. Now Colert Road.
- PR 441 (PTH 1 in Elkhorn to PTH 83) — Decommissioned during the 1992 Great Decommissioning. Now Road 69N.
- PR 444 (First use, PR 341 to William Lake Provincial Park) — Decommissioned during the Great 1992 Decommissioned. Now Lake William Road (Road 112W).
- PR 446 (PTH 3 to Turtle Mountain Provincial Park) — Decommissioned during the 1992 Great Decommissioning.
- PR 447 (PTH 83 to PR 254) — Decommissioned during the 1992 Great Decommissioning. Section west of PR 452 became part of PR 452, and the rest now Road 22N.
- PR 451 (PR 344 to PR 340 in Treesbank) — became part of PR 340 in 1990, and part of PR 530 during the 1992 Great Decommissioning.
- PR 454 (PTH 2 to PR 347) — Became part of PR 347 during the 1992 Great Decommissioning as the section of PR 347 west of there were decommissioned.
- PR 456 (PTH 3 to PR 251) — Decommissioned in 1973. Was three miles east of current PR 256 (which at the time went on a north–south route 2 miles west of its current route).
- PR 458 (First use, PR 251 near Dalny to PTH 3 (Boundary Commission Trail) near Melita) — Decommissioned during the Great 1992 Decommissioning. Now Road 154W.
- PR 460 (PTH 16 to PR 264) — Decommissioned during the 1992 Great Decommissioning. Now Road 65W.
- PR 461 (PTH 34 to PR 242) — Decommissioned during the 1992 Great Decommissioning. Section east of PR 350 became part of PR 350.
- PR 465 (Section) — Section from PR 464 to PTH 5 decommissioned during the 1992 Great Decommissioning. Now Road 75N.
- PR 466 (Section) — Section from PTH 16 to PR 357 decommissioned during the 1992 Great Decommissioning. Now Franklin Road and Road 95W.
- PR 467 (Section) — Section from PTH 41 to Saskatchewan decommissioned during the 1992 Great Decommissioning. Now Road 77N.
- PR 468 (Section) — Section from PR 353 to PR 465 decommissioned during the 1992 Great Decommissioning. Now Road 101W.
- PR 472 (first use) (PTH 45 in Vista to PTH 16) — Decommissioned during the 1992 Great Decommissioning. Now Road 140W.
- PR 473 (PTH 10 to PTH 16 near Newdale) — Decommissioned during the 1992 Great Decommissioning. Now Road 91N.
- PR 477 (PR 264 to PTH 21) — Decommissioned in 1984. Now Road 93N.
- PR 479 (PTH 16/83 to PR 476) — Decommissioned during the 1992 Great Decommissioning. Now Road 116N.
- PR 483 (First use, PTH 83 to Duck Mountain Provincial Park) — Decommissioned during the Great 1992 decommissioning. Now Merridale Road.
- PR 506 (section, PTH 1 (Trans-Canada) near Spruce Siding to PTH 11 near Reynolds) — Now Spruce Siding Road
- PR 509 (First use, PR 308 at Moose Lake Provincial Park to Birch Point Provincial Park, all within the Northwest Angle Provincial Forest) — 1966–1968, now an unnamed access road into parks.
- PR 510 (PTH 44 in Tyndall to PR 435) — 1984–1990, now Pierson Drive and Road 35E.
- PR 511 (PTH 6 to PR 518) — Decommissioned during the 1992 Great Decommissioning. Now Road 103N.
- PR 514 (PR 325 west of Ashern to PTH 68) — Decommissioned during the 1992 Great Decommissioning. Now Old 514.
- PR 515 (PTH 8 to PTH 9 in Clandeboye) — Decommissioned during the 1992 Great Decommissioning. Now Clandeboye Road.
- PR 516 (PR 233 (this section no longer a PR road) east two blocks, south one block, east one block, and south to PR 329) — Decommissioned during the 1992 Great Decommissioning.
- PR 517 (PR 322 to PR 236) — Decommissioned during the 1992 Great Decommissioning. Now Road 85N.
- PR 518 (Section) — Section from PR 415 to PR 229 decommissioned during the 1992 Great Decommissioning. Now Ideal Road.
- PR 522 (PR 421 via Halbstadt to PR 243) — Decommissioned during the 1992 Great Decommissioning. Now Road 4E.
- PR 523 (PR 332 to PTH 75) — Decommissioned during the 1992 Great Decommissioning. Now Road 19N, Sewell Road, Road 21N.
- PR 526 (PR 249 to PTH 26) — Decommissioned during the 1992 Great Decommissioning. Now Road 30W.
- PR 530 (first use) (PTH 23 to PR 245 in Bruxelles) — Decommissioned during the 1992 Great Decommissioning. Now Road 64W.
- PR 541 (first use) (PTH 5 east and south to PR 442) — Decommissioned during the 1992 Great Decommissioning.
- PR 561 (PTH 10 to PR 468) — Decommissioned during the 1992 Great Decommissioning. Now Road 65N, Road 105W, Road 67N.
- PR 562 (PR 265 to PR 357) — Transferred to PR 466 in 1984. Decommissioned during the 1992 Great Decommissioning. Now Road 95W.
- PR 563 (PR 270 to PTH 10) — Decommissioned during the 1992 Great Decommissioning. Now Road 81N.
- PR 564 (first use) (PR 262 east 3 miles, north 2 miles, east 1 mile, and north 1 mile to PR 471) — Decommissioned during the 1992 Great Decommissioning.
- PR 565 (PTH 41 to Saskatchewan) — Decommissioned during the 1992 Great Decommissioning. Now Road 82N.
- PR 566 (First use, PTH 45 / PTH 21 in Oakburn to PR 577 near Olha) — Swapped with PR 577 in 1992
- PR 573 (PTH 50 to Hollywood Beach) — Decommissioned during the 1992 Great Decommissioning.
- PR 577 (Section, former PR 359 in Rogers to PR 566 near Olha) — Swapped with PR 566 in 1992
- PR 581 (PTH 5 to PR 360) — Became part of PR 360 during the 1992 Great Decommissioning.
- PR 585 (PR 364 to PR 276) — Decommissioned during the 1992 Great Decommissioning. Now an unknown road and Road 160N.
- PR 586 (PTH 83 north of Durban to PTH 83) — Decommissioned during the 1992 Great Decommissioning, with the section north of PR 486 becoming part of PR 486. Rest now Road 192N and an unnamed road.
- PR 587 (PR 266 in Bowsman to PR 268) — Decommissioned in 2006, with the section west of PR 366 becoming part of PR 366.
- PR 589 (PTH 83 to PR 592 (then PR 478)) — Decommissioned during the 1992 Great Decommissioning. Now Road 141N.
- PR 592 (First use, PR 484 near Deepdale to PTH 83 near Silverwood) — Decommissioned during the Great 1992 Decommissioning. Now a section of PR 593, as well as Road 156.5N and Road 169W.

== See also ==
- List of Winnipeg City Routes
