= Rural Municipality of Clanwilliam =

Rural municipality in Manitoba, Canada

Coordinates: 50°30′22″N 99°48′56″W

The Rural Municipality of Clanwilliam is a former rural municipality (RM) in the Canadian province of Manitoba. It was originally incorporated as a rural municipality on December 22, 1883. It ceased on January 1, 2015 as a result of its provincially mandated amalgamation with the Town of Erickson to form the Municipality of Clanwilliam – Erickson.

The RM was located in an area of mixed farming positioned on the southeast side of Riding Mountain National Park. The southern part of the RM was flatter farmland while the northern part was more rugged with many hills, forests and lakes. This area is a nesting area for various species of ducks and also a major flyway for geese. The communities of Hilltop and Scandinavia were formed by Swedish settlers in the late 19th century.

The RM took its name from the community of Clanwilliam to the south, which is now located in the Rural Municipality of Minto-Odanah. In 1902 when the RM of Minto was formed, the two most southern townships of Clanwilliam were placed in that entity. Clanwilliam had been named after Richard Meade, 4th Earl of Clanwilliam.

== Communities ==
- Crocus
- Hilltop
- Kerrs Lake
- Scandinavia
