= Manitoba Provincial Road 357 =

Provincial road in Manitoba, Canada

Provincial Road 357
- PR 357 highlighted in red

Route information
- Maintained by Department of Infrastructure
- Length: 34.9 km (21.7 mi)
- Existed: 1966–present

Major junctions
- West end: PTH 10 near Erickson
- PR 262 at Hilltop
- East end: PTH 5 near Birnie

Location
- Country: Canada
- Province: Manitoba
- Rural municipalities: Clanwilliam – Erickson; Rosedale

Highway system
- Provincial highways in Manitoba; Winnipeg City Routes
← PR 355	→ PR 359

Provincial Road 357 (PR 357) is a 34.9-kilometre-long (21.7 mi) east-west highway in the Westman Region of the Canadian province of Manitoba.

== Route description ==
PR 357 begins at PTH 10 just south of Erickson, and terminates at PTH 5 near the small community of Birnie.

PR 357 is an east-west highway providing access to the unincorporated communities of Mountain Road and Hilltop, where it intersects with PR 262. Although the road also has two significant north-south jaunts, it is generally quite straight. The road does contain a few sharp curves, notably on its descent to its eastbound terminus with PTH 5.

The route is paved for its entire length. The speed limit 100 kilometres per hour (62 mph).

== Major intersections ==
Division	Location	km	mi	Destinations	Notes
Clanwilliam-Erickson		0.0	0.0	PTH 10 (John Bracken Highway) – Minnedosa, Erickson	Western terminus
Clanwilliam-Erickson		4.9	3.0	Otter Lake Road – Otter Lake	
Clanwilliam-Erickson	Hilltop	6.5	4.0	PR 262 – Onanole, Clanwilliam	Former PTH 10
Rosedale		34.9	21.7	PTH 5 (Parks Route) – McCreary, Neepawa	Eastern terminus; road continues east as Road 97N
1.000 mi = 1.609 km; 1.000 km = 0.621 mi
