= Manitoba Provincial Road 466 =

Provincial road in Manitoba, Canada

Provincial Road 466

Route information
- Maintained by Department of Infrastructure
- Length: 10 km (6.2 mi)
- Existed: 1966–present

Major junctions
- North end: PTH 16 (TCH) / YH near Franklin
- South end: PR 465 near Cordova

Location
- Country: Canada
- Province: Manitoba
- Rural municipalities: Minto – Odanah

Highway system
- Provincial highways in Manitoba; Winnipeg City Routes
← PR 465	→ PR 467

Provincial Road 466 (PR 466) is a short 10-kilometre-long (6.2 mi) north-south provincial road in the Westman Region of the Canadian province of Manitoba.

== Route description ==
PR 466 is a north–south provincial road that begins at PR 465 near the unincorporated community of Cordova, and travels to its northbound terminus with the Yellowhead Highway near Franklin.

PR 466 is a gravel road for its entire length.

== History ==
In the early 1990s, the Manitoba government decommissioned a number of provincial secondary roads and returned the maintenance of these roads back to the rural municipalities. A large portion of the original PR 466 was included in this decommissioning.

Prior to this, PR 466 continued east in concurrence with the Yellowhead Highway for 1.6 kilometres (0.99 mi) to Franklin Road. From this point, it travelled north through Franklin and terminated at a junction with PR 471.

In 1984, PR 466 was extended further north to the unincorporated community of Mountain Road, where it terminated at PR 357. The section of the extension between Mountain Road and PR 265 had previously been designated as PR 562, which was decommissioned and transferred to the new number. This section is now a municipal road.

The original length of PR 466 was 26 kilometres (16 mi) to PR 471, and 39 kilometres (24 mi) after its extension to PR 357.

== Major intersections ==
Division	Location	km	mi	Destinations	Notes
Minto-Odanah		0.0	0.0	PR 465 – Cordova, Brookdale	Southern terminus; road continues as PR 465 east
Minto-Odanah		10.0	6.2	PTH 16 (TCH) / YH – Minnedosa, Neepawa	Northern terminus; road continues north as Road 97W
1.000 mi = 1.609 km; 1.000 km = 0.621 mi
