= Manitoba Provincial Road 471 =

Provincial road in Manitoba, Canada

Provincial Road 471
- Clanwilliam School Road, Road 90N

Route information
- Maintained by Department of Infrastructure
- Length: 23.8 km (14.8 mi)
- Existed: 1966–present

Major junctions
- West end: PR 262 near Clanwilliam
- East end: PTH 5 near Neepawa

Location
- Country: Canada
- Province: Manitoba
- Rural municipalities: Minto-Odanah, Rosedale

Highway system
- Provincial highways in Manitoba; Winnipeg City Routes
← PR 470	→ PR 472

Provincial Road 471 (PR 471) is a 23.8-kilometre-long (14.8 mi) east–west highway in the Westman Region of Manitoba, providing road access to the hamlet of Bethany, as well as a connection between the towns of Clanwilliam and Neepawa. While all of PR 471 lies along Road 90N, the segment within the Rural Municipality of Minto-Odanah is also known as Clanwilliam School Road.

== Route description ==
PR 471 begins in the Rural Municipality of Minto-Odanah at an intersection with PR 262 just south of Clanwilliam, heading due east to travel just to the north of Bethany, connected via Roads 99W and 98W (latter being former PR 564, as well as crossing the Trans Canada Trail. Entering the Rural Municipality of Rosedale via a switchback and a bridge over a small creek, the highway has an intersection with Road 95W (Former PR 466; provides a connection to Franklin, Mountain Road, and Polonia) before heading due east through rural farmland for several kilometres before coming to an end at a junction with PTH 5 (Parks Route) between Eden and Neepawa. The entire length of PR 471 is a rural, gravel, two-lane highway.

== Major intersections ==
Division	Location	km	mi	Destinations	Notes
Minto-Odanah		0.0	0.0	PR 262 – Minnedosa, Clanwilliam	Western terminus; road continues west as Road 90N
Minto-Odanah		4.9	3.0	Road 99W – Bethany	
Minto-Odanah		6.6	4.1	Road 98W – Bethany	Former PR 564 south
Rosedale		11.6	7.2	Road 95W – Mountain Road, Polonia, Franklin	Former PR 466
Rosedale		23.8	14.8	PTH 5 (Parks Route) – Dauphin, Neepawa	Eastern terminus; road continues east as Road 90N
1.000 mi = 1.609 km; 1.000 km = 0.621 mi
