= Clanwilliam =

Clanwilliam may refer to:

- Clanwilliam (County Tipperary), barony in Ireland
  - Earl of Clanwilliam, title in the Peerage of Ireland
  - Theodosia Meade, Countess of Clanwilliam
  - Clanwilliam Rugby Club, in Tipperary
- Clanwilliam (County Limerick), barony in Ireland
- Clanwilliam, Western Cape, town in South Africa
- Clanwilliam, Manitoba, a community in Canada
- Rural Municipality of Clanwilliam, Manitoba, merged into:
  - Municipality of Clanwilliam-Erickson

== See also ==
- Clanwilliam redfin, a fish species native to South Africa
- Clanwilliam yellowfish, a fish species native to South Africa
- Clanwilliam sandfish, a fish species native to South Africa
- Clanwilliam rock-catfish, a fish species native to South Africa
- Sawfin or Clanwilliam sawfin, a fish species native to South Africa
- Widdringtonia wallichii or Clanwilliam cypress, a tree species native to South Africa
- Clanwilliam Dam, a dam in South Africa
