= Manitoba Provincial Road 465 =

Provincial road in Manitoba, Canada

Provincial Road 465

Route information
- Maintained by Department of Infrastructure
- Length: 24 km (15 mi)
- Existed: 1966–present

Major junctions
- West end: PR 262 near Minnedosa
- PR 466 near Cordova
- East end: PR 464 in Mentmore

Location
- Country: Canada
- Province: Manitoba
- Rural municipalities: Minto – Odanah; North Cypress – Langford

Highway system
- Provincial highways in Manitoba; Winnipeg City Routes
← PR 464	→ PR 466

Provincial Road 465 (PR 465) is a 24-kilometre-long (15 mi) east-west provincial road in the Westman Region of the Canadian province of Manitoba.

== Route description ==
PR 465 is an east–west provincial road that begins at PR 262 and travels to its eastbound terminus with PR 464 near the unincorporated community of Mentmore.

The road provides access to the unincorporated community of Cordova, where it is the southbound terminus for PR 466.

PR 465 is a gravel road for its entire length.

== History ==
In the early 1990s, the Manitoba government decommissioned a number of provincial secondary roads and returned the maintenance of these roads back to the rural municipalities. A small portion of the original PR 465 was included in this decommissioning.

Prior to this, PR 465 continued south in concurrence with PR 464 for 1.6 kilometres (1 mi). From this point, it continued east to its terminus with PTH 5 (PR 258 prior to 1980).

This section is now a municipal road.

The original length of PR 465 was 32 kilometres (20 mi).

== Major intersections ==
Division	Location	km	mi	Destinations	Notes
Minto-Odanah		0.0	0.0	PR 262 – Rapid City, Minnedosa	Western terminus; road continues west as Road 77N
Minto-Odanah		4.9	3.0	Road 101W – Moore Park	Former PR 468 south
Minto-Odanah		11.5	7.1	PR 466 north – Franklin	Southern terminus of PR 466
North Cypress-Langford	Mentmore	24.0	14.9	PR 464 – Neepawa, Brookdale	Eastern terminus
1.000 mi = 1.609 km; 1.000 km = 0.621 mi
