= Manitoba Highway 16A =

Highway in Manitoba

Provincial Trunk Highway 16A
- PTH 16A highlighted in red

Route information
- Auxiliary route of PTH 16
- Maintained by Manitoba Infrastructure
- Length: 9.1 km (5.7 mi)
- Existed: 1971–present

Major junctions
- South end: PTH 16 (TCH) / PR 262 south / YH near Minnedosa
- PR 262 north (2nd Avenue SE); PR 355 west (6th Avenue NW)
- West end: PTH 16 (TCH) / PTH 10 / YH northwest of Minnedosa

Location
- Country: Canada
- Province: Manitoba
- Rural municipalities: Minto – Odanah
- Towns: Minnedosa

Highway system
- Provincial highways in Manitoba; Winnipeg City Routes
← PTH 16	→ PTH 17

Provincial Trunk Highway 16A (PTH 16A) is a provincial highway in the Canadian province of Manitoba which provides access to the town of Minnedosa. The highway is an alternate route of PTH 16 (Trans-Canada Highway's Yellowhead Highway section) and PTH 10. Like most alternate routes, it previously served as the main highway through the town.

== Route Description ==
PTH 16A runs in concurrence with PR 262 from its southern terminus into Minnedosa, using 1st Street S.W., 3rd Avenue S.W., and Main Street within the town limits before PR 262 leaves the concurrence at 2nd Avenue S.E.

PTH 16A continues along Main Street before meeting westbound PR 355 (6th Avenue N.W.) at the north end of the town. The highway leaves Minnedosa after passing PR 355 and starts transitioning to an east-west route for 1.5 kilometres (0.93 mi) as it climbs out of the valley, completing the transition once it reaches the top. From this point, PTH 16A continues for 3.5 kilometres (2.2 mi) to its western terminus with PTH 16 and PTH 10.

The speed limits for PTH 16A are as follows:

- 90 kilometres per hour (56 mph) from PTH 16/PR 262 to Minnedosa
- 70 kilometres per hour (43 mph) as the highway approaches Minnedosa's southern limits
- 50 kilometres per hour (31 mph) within the town of Minnedosa
- 80 kilometres per hour (50 mph) from PR 355 to the top of the valley
- 100 kilometres per hour (62 mph) from the top of the valley to PTH 16/PTH 10

== History ==
Prior to 1971, PTH 16A was designated as a shared concurrence of PTH 4 and PTH 10. PR 262 was added to its current portion of the route when the Government of Manitoba implemented its secondary road system in 1966.

The Minnedosa by-pass was completed and opened to traffic in 1971, with the PTH 4/10 designation being transferred to the new highway. The old highway was re-designated as PTH 4A and kept that designation until 1977, when it was given its current number to coincide with the renumbering of the Manitoba portion of the Yellowhead Highway from PTH 4 to PTH 16.

== Major intersections ==
Division	Location	km	mi	Destinations	Notes
Minto-Odanah		0.0	0.0	PTH 16 (TCH) / YH – Neepawa, Brandon; PR 262 south – Rapid City	Southern terminus of PTH 16A; southern end of PR 262 concurrency (overlap)
City of Minnedosa		2.6	1.6	PR 262 north (2nd Avenue SE) – Minnedosa Dam, Minnedosa Beach	Northern end of PR 262 concurrency
City of Minnedosa		2.8	1.7	Crosses the Little Saskatchewan River	
City of Minnedosa		3.5	2.2	PR 355 west (6th Avenue NW)	Eastern terminus of PR 355
Minto-Odanah		8.7	5.4	Road 105W – Ski Valley	
Minto-Odanah		9.1	5.7	PTH 16 (TCH) / PTH 10 / YH – Russell, Brandon, Dauphin	Northern terminus
1.000 mi = 1.609 km; 1.000 km = 0.621 mi: Concurrency terminus
