= Manitoba Provincial Road 283 =

Provincial road in Manitoba, Canada

Provincial Road 283
- Northern Woods and Water Route
- PR 283 highlighted in red

Route information
- Maintained by Department of Infrastructure
- Length: 39.5 km (24.5 mi)

Major junctions
- West end: Highway 9 / Highway 55 at Saskatchewan boundary
- East end: PTH 10 in The Pas

Location
- Country: Canada
- Province: Manitoba
- Rural municipalities: Kelsey
- Towns: The Pas

Highway system
- Provincial highways in Manitoba; Winnipeg City Routes
← PR 282	→ PR 285

Provincial Road 283 (PR 283) is a 39.5-kilometre-long (24.5 mi) east-west provincial road in the NorMan Region of Manitoba, Canada, connecting the town of The Pas with the Saskatchewan border, where it continues as Saskatchewan Highway 9 / Highway 55 (Saskota Flyway / Northern Woods and Water Route).

PR 283 is paved for is entire length, and the speed limit is 100 km/h. It parallels the south bank of the Carrot River for its entire length. The highway is a part of the Northern Woods and Water Route.

== Major intersections ==
Division	Location	km	mi	Destinations	Notes
Kelsey		0.0	0.0	Highway 9 south / Highway 55 west (NWRR west) – Hudson Bay	Continuation into Saskatchewan; western terminus
Kelsey		5.4	3.4	Bridge over the Culdesac River	
Kelsey		21.8	13.5	PR 282 south	Northern terminus of PR 282
Kelsey		38.7	24.0	Bridge over the Pasquia River	
Town of The Pas		39.5	24.5	PTH 10 (NWWR east) – Flin Flon, Swan River PR 285 east (3rd Street E) to PR 289	Eastern terminus; western terminus of PR 285; NWWR follows PTH 10 southbound
1.000 mi = 1.609 km; 1.000 km = 0.621 mi

== Related route ==
Provincial Road 282
- Location: Rural Municipality of Kelsey
- Length: 23.8 km (14.8 mi)
- Existed: 1966–present

Provincial Road 282 (PR 282) is a 23.8-kilometre-long (14.8 mi) north-south spur of PR 283, connecting it with PTH 10 at the locality of Westray. It serves as a backcountry route for travellers on the Northern Woods and Water Route wishing to bypass the town of The Pas. It is entirely a two-lane gravel road, located almost entirely in the Rural Municipality of Kelsey, and includes a culvert crossing of the Pasquia River.

Division	Location	km	mi	Destinations	Notes
Kelsey	Westray	0.0	0.0	PTH 10 (NWWR) – The Pas, Mafeking	Southern terminus
No. 21	No major junctions				
Kelsey		6.2	3.9	Bridge over the Pasquia River	
Kelsey		23.8	14.8	PR 283 (NWWR) – Hudson Bay, The Pas	Northern terminus
1.000 mi = 1.609 km; 1.000 km = 0.621 mi
