= Bill Binney =

Bill Binney may refer to:

- William Binney (U.S. intelligence official) (born 1943), American intelligence official
- Bill Binney (ice hockey) (1897–1967), Canadian ice hockey player
