= Manitoba Provincial Road 263 =

Former provincial road in Manitoba, Canada

Provincial Road 263

Route information
- Maintained by Department of Infrastructure
- Length: 28.2 km (17.5 mi)
- Existed: 1966–(c) 1992

Major junctions
- East end: PR 262 near Scandinavia
- PTH 10 at Onanole; PR 270 south
- North end: Riding Mountain National Park south boundary

Location
- Country: Canada
- Province: Manitoba
- Rural municipalities: Harrison Park

Highway system
- Provincial highways in Manitoba; Winnipeg City Routes
← PR 262	→ PR 264

Provincial Road 263 (PR 263) is a former provincial road in the Parkland Region of the Canadian province of Manitoba.

== Route description ==
PR 263 began at a 'T' junction with PR 262 north of Scandinavia. From this junction, it travelled 18 kilometres (11 mi) northwest before meeting PTH 10 in Onanole. The two highways shared a short (~20m) concurrence before PR 263 left the concurrence and continued west for 5 kilometres (3.1 mi) to meet southbound PR 270. From PR 270, PR 263 continued north for 5 kilometres (3.1 mi) to its northern terminus at the south boundary of Riding Mountain National Park. The road continued into the park past several church camps and public campsites along the southwestern shore of Clear Lake. The route was gravel for most of its length, except for the section of the route between PR 270 and Onanole.

PR 263 was designated as an east-west route except for the section between Riding Mountain National Park and PR 270, which was designated as north-south.

== History ==
In the early 1990s, the Manitoba government decommissioned a number of provincial secondary roads and returned the maintenance of these roads back to the rural municipalities. PR 263 was one of the roads that was decommissioned entirely.

After PR 263 was decommissioned, PR 262 was rerouted onto the section between its former junction with PR 263 and Onanole. PR 270 was extended on to the paved section to Onanole and maintained that designation until 1997, when the road was redesignated as PR 354, reconfiguring PR 270 to its current northbound terminus. The north-south section between Riding Mountain National Park and the former junction with PR 270 is now maintained by the Municipality of Harrison Park.
