= Manitoba Provincial Road 448 =

Provincial road in Manitoba, Canada

Provincial Road 448

Route information
- Maintained by Department of Infrastructure
- Length: 34.5 km (21.4 mi)
- Existed: 1966–present

Major junctions
- South end: PTH 10 near Boissevain
- PR 343 near Croll
- North end: PTH 23 in Elgin

Location
- Country: Canada
- Province: Manitoba
- Rural municipalities: Boissevain-Morton, Grassland

Highway system
- Provincial highways in Manitoba; Winnipeg City Routes
| ← PR 445 | → PR 449 |

Provincial Road 448 (PR 448) is a 34.5-kilometre-long (21.4 mi) north–south highway in the Westman Region of Manitoba. It connects the towns of Elgin and Boissevain while running along the northern coastline of Whitewater Lake.

== Route description ==
PR 448 begins in the Municipality of Boissevain-Morton at a junction with PTH 10 (John Bracken Highway) just north of Boissevain, heading west through rural farmland. It goes through a couple switchbacks as it begins travelling along the northern shores of Whitewater Lake for several kilometres before making a sharp right onto Road 124W. Heading north through rural farmland, the highway junctions with PR 343 between Croll and Regent shortly before entering the Municipality of Grassland, continuing north through rural areas to enter the town of Elgin and come to an end at an intersection with PTH 23, with the road continuing north as Souris Avenue. The entire length of PR 448 is a gravel, two-lane highway.

== History ==
Prior to 1990, PR 448 only existed along the 11.5 kilometres (7.1 mi) north-south section between PR 343 and Elgin. In 1990, it was extended south to PTH 10 along its current alignment, replacing an older (and slightly different) section of PR 348.

== Major intersections ==
| Division | Location | km | mi | Destinations | Notes |
|---|---|---|---|---|---|
| Boissevain-Morton | | 0.0 | 0.0 | PTH 10 – Minto, Boissevain | Southern terminus |
| Boissevain-Morton | | 3.6 | 2.2 | Road 117W – Boissevain | Former PR 348 south |
| Boissevain-Morton | | 11.5 | 7.1 | Road 120W | Former PR 348 north |
| Boissevain-Morton | | 23.0 | 14.3 | PR 343 east (Croll Road) – Croll; Dand-Regent-Croll Road (Road 23N) – Dand, Regent | Eastern terminus of PR 343 |
| Grassland | Elgin | 34.5 | 21.4 | PTH 23 – Hartney, Minto | Northern terminus; road continues north as Souris Avenue |
1.000 mi = 1.609 km; 1.000 km = 0.621 mi
