= Bill Binney (ice hockey) =

Canadian ice hockey player

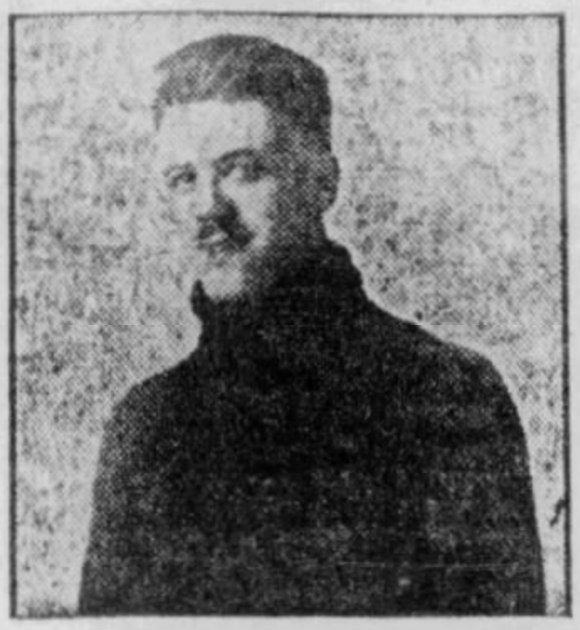
- Binney c. 1921
- Born: August 29, 1897; Forrest, Manitoba, Canada
- Died: April 30, 1967 (aged 69)
- Height: 5 ft 8 in (173 cm)
- Weight: 150 lb (68 kg; 10 st 10 lb)
- Position: Goaltender
- Played for: Saskatoon Sheiks; Calgary Tigers; Edmonton Eskimos
- Playing career: 1917–1924

William Thomas Binney (August 29, 1897 – April 30, 1967) was a Canadian professional ice hockey player. He played with the Saskatoon Sheiks, Calgary Tigers, Edmonton Eskimos of the Western Canada Hockey League.
