= Rural Municipality of Kelsey =

Rural municipality in Manitoba, Canada

Kelsey
- Rural municipality
- Rural Municipality of Kelsey
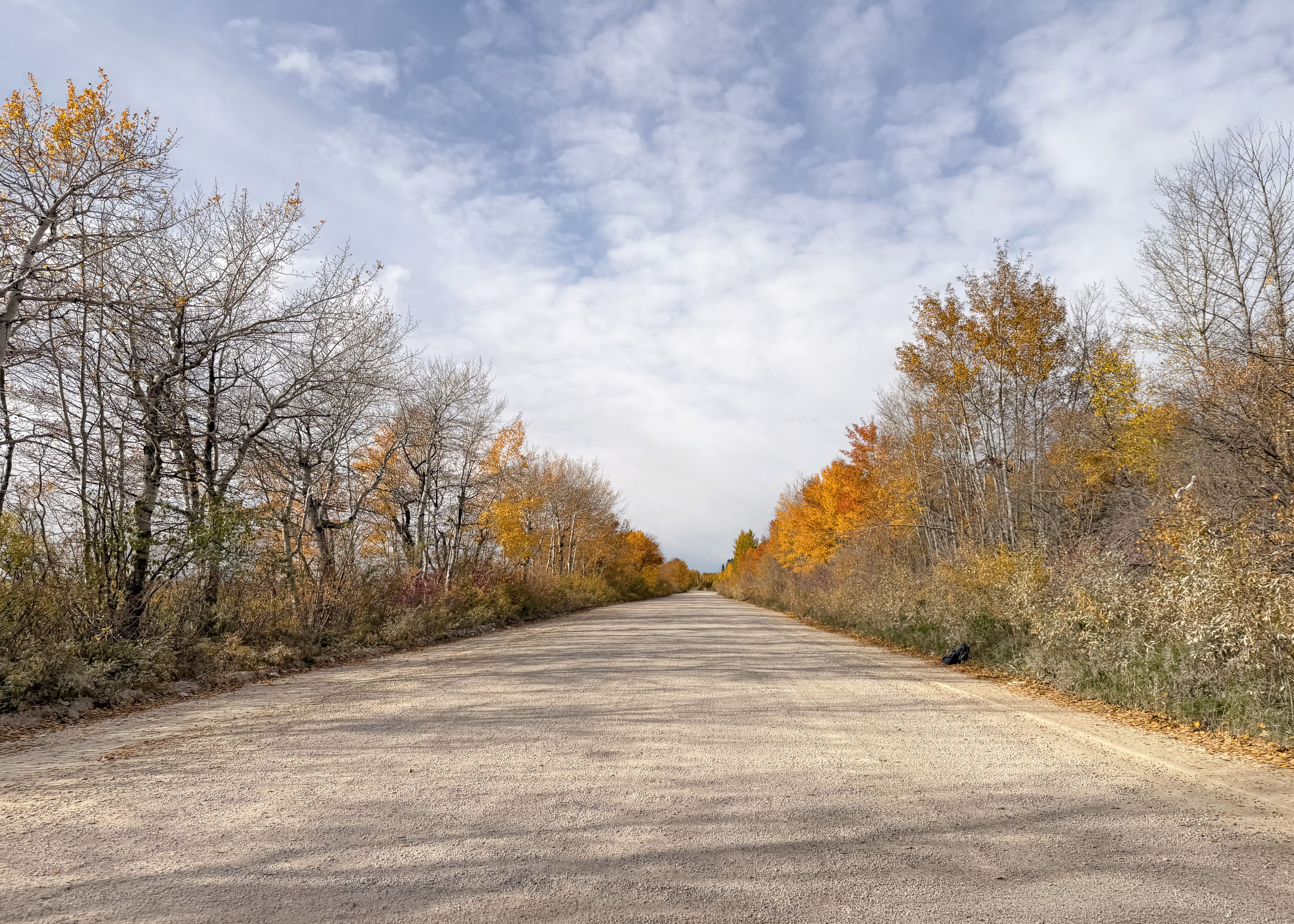
- Umpherville

- Location within Manitoba
- Coordinates: 53°44′08″N 101°23′42″W
- Country: Canada
- Province: Manitoba
- Region: Northern
- Federal riding: Churchill—Keewatinook Aski
- Provincial riding: The Pas-Kameesak

Government
  - Reeve: Rod Berezowecki
  - Office location: The Pas

Area
  - Total: 867.64 km^{2} (335.00 sq mi)

Population (2016)
  - Total: 2,424
- Postal code: R9A 1K6
- Website: Official website

Kelsey is a Manitoban rural municipality embedded within the province's Northern Region. It consists of several disjoint parts. The largest part is Carrot Valley, located around and southwest of The Pas along the Carrot River, but the communities of Wanless and Cranberry Portage, located further north, are also part of the municipality. It is 867.64 km^{2} large. Also lying in the area around The Pas is the Opaskwayak Cree Nation Indian reserve.

== Communities ==
- Cranberry Portage
- Freshford
- Grace Lake
- Moostissoostikwan
- Ralls Island
- Rocky Lake
- The Pas (independent town)
- Umpherville
- Wanless
- Westray

== Demographics ==
In the 2021 Census of Population conducted by Statistics Canada, Kelsey had a population of 2,181 living in 857 of its 1,041 total private dwellings, a change of −9.8% from its 2016 population of 2,419. With a land area of 850.41 km^{2} (328.35 sq mi), it had a population density of 2.6/km^{2} (6.6/sq mi) in 2021.

According to the 2011 National Household Survey, the population of Kelsey is 2,125. The population density was 2.6 per km^{2}. The racial make up of Kelsey is solely made up of Aboriginals (44.0%); First Nations (23.1%) and Metis (20.7%), and Whites (56.0%). The religious make up of Kelsey is; Christian (74.5%), non-religious (25.5%). Every resident of Kelsey is a Canadian citizen. About 4.0% of the population can speak a language that is not recognized as an official language of Canada.
