= Forrest, Manitoba =

Coordinates: 49°57′59″N 99°56′12″W

Location of Forrest in Manitoba

Forrest is a small hamlet situated in the Rural Municipality of Elton, Manitoba, Canada. In the 2001 census the municipality had a population of around 1,337.

Forrest is located approximately 8 km (5.0 mi) north of the intersection of the Trans-Canada Highway and PTH 10, near Brandon.

Forrest was first established in the early 1880s, at the time of the western railroad was completed. It was named for W. H. Forrest, official receiver for the Great North West Central who later became Government Inspector of Railways.

Serviced by the railway, Forrest had two grain elevators: a wooden one and a second elevator constructed in the late 1920s by Manitoba Pool Elevators with an annex built in 1956. Forrest lost its rail connection in 1980 and both elevators were demolished in 2018.

Forrest has one business, The Bend in the Willow tea house. It also hosts a farmers market throughout the summer months. Northeast of the hamlet along Justice Road is a bed and breakfast called the Elton Heritage House.

Forrest is also home to the Forrest United Church, Elton Collegiate, and Forrest Elementary School.
