= Hilltop, Manitoba =

Coordinates: 50°28′11″N 99°48′48″W

Hilltop is a rural community in the Municipality of Clanwilliam – Erickson and is a mixed agricultural area.

Historically, the area was settled by Scandinavian immigrants, mainly from Sweden, starting in the 1880s. The community opened a post office in 1900 located on 19-17-17W and a one-room school was located on NE 24-17-18W. The other establishment which still is operational is a Baptist church founded by the early settlers and named after the locality.

To the north of Hilltop lies Scandinavia, which was settled during the same period and with the same immigrant mix.
