= Clanwilliam, Manitoba =

Community in Manitoba, Canada

Clanwilliam
- Unincorporated community
- Interactive map of Clanwilliam
- Coordinates: 50°21′43″N 99°48′53″W
- Country: Canada
- Province: Manitoba
- Region: Westman
- Rural municipality: Minto-Odanah
- Post office opened: 1882
- Named for: Richard Meade, 4th Earl of Clanwilliam
- Time zone: UTC−6 (CST)
  - Summer (DST): UTC−5 (CDT)
- Area code(s): 204 and 431

Clanwilliam, is a community in the Rural Municipality of Minto-Odanah in Manitoba, Canada. Located is in a mainly agricultural area 14 kilometres (8.7 mi) north of Minnedosa along PR 262.

A post office was opened there in 1882 and was originally identified as Clan William (30-16-17W). In 1902 the post office was moved to coordinate with the Canadian National railway on 13-16-18W.

ClanWilliam is famous in the local area for its pies. The old-style, homemade recipes have been shared down through local families who bake pies and share with local charitable organizations.

In 1891, the Clanwilliam subdistrict had a population of 596.

== Etymology ==
The original name requested for the community by the residents was Lamontagne but Ottawa assigned the present name to honour Richard Meade, 4th Earl of Clanwilliam. The Municipality of Clanwilliam – Erickson immediately north takes its name from the community.

== Clanwilliam Greys 1972-77 ==
Clanwilliam is home of the Fastball team the Clanwilliam Greys. A team which was inducted into the Manitoba Softball Hall of Fame in 2013. The 1972-77 Clanwilliam Greys Fastball Team represented the 100 inhabitant village of Clanwilliam, 40 miles (64 km) north of Brandon. A team in their early 20s, they dominated fastball in southern Manitoba. They were undefeated during the first two seasons in the Minnedosa and District Fastball League; and, combined with tournament games, played 90 games in 1972 and 92 games in 1973. The latter brought them $1,100.00 in tournament prize money. With several additions, they joined the Brandon Centennial Fastball League in 1973, and by 1976, they won the league title and played in the Senior 'A' provincials for the 4th consecutive year. A dominating presence in league and provincial play. The name "Greys" comes from the school in Clanwilliam that was called "Grey School"
