= Erickson, Manitoba =

Town in Manitoba, Canada

Erickson
- Unincorporated community
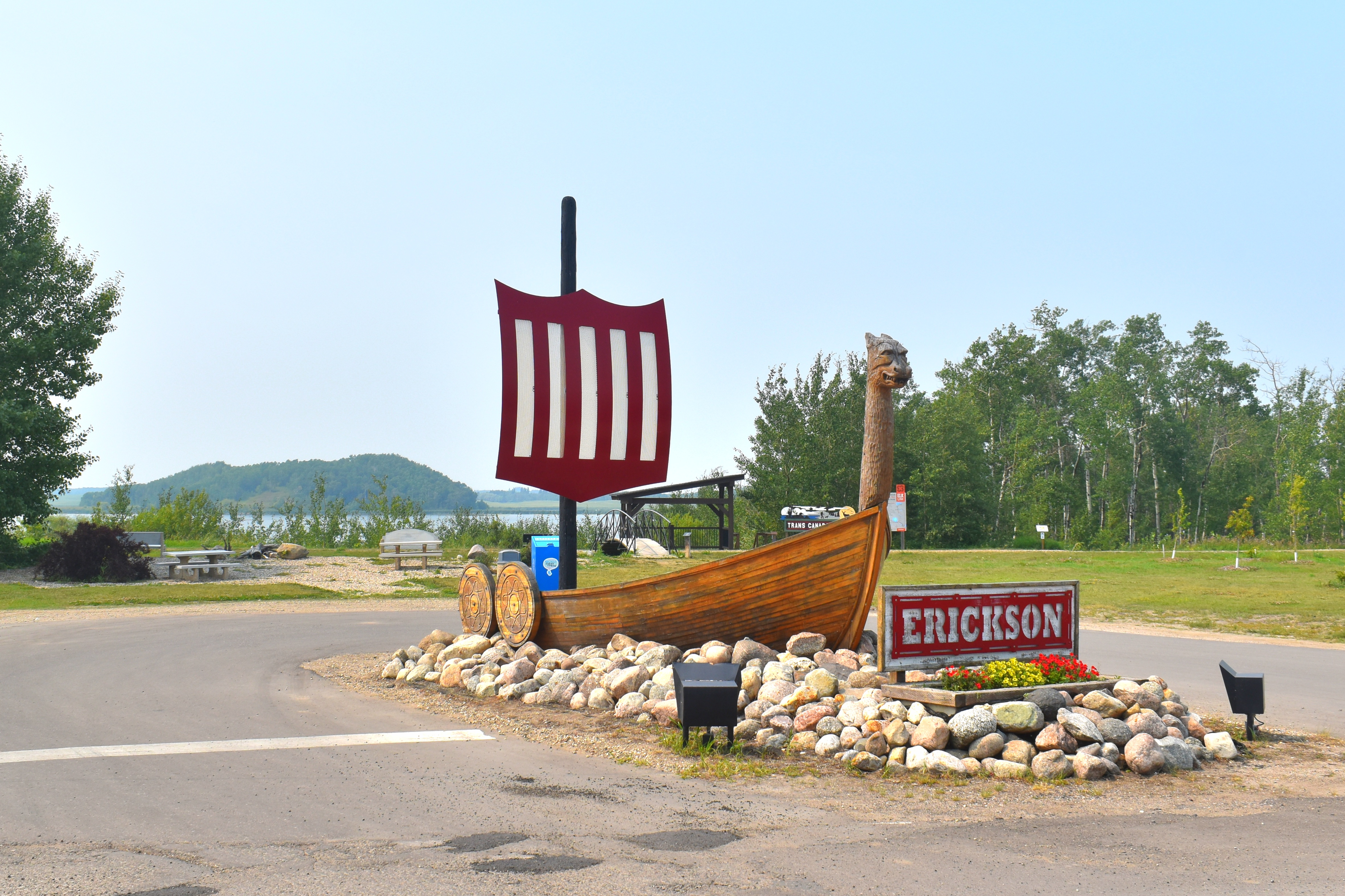
- The Erickson viking ship monument in the community, with Leda Lake in the background.

- Location of Mitchell in Manitoba
- Coordinates: 50°29′53″N 99°54′41″W
- Country: Canada
- Province: Manitoba
- Region: Westman
- Rural Municipality: Clanwilliam – Erickson

Area
  - Total: 1.29 km^{2} (0.50 sq mi)
- Elevation: 632 m (2,073 ft)

Population (2021)
  - Total: 473
  - Density: 367.1/km^{2} (951/sq mi)
- Time zone: UTC-6 (CST)
  - Summer (DST): UTC-5 (CDT)

Erickson is an unincorporated urban community in the Municipality of Clanwilliam – Erickson within the Canadian province of Manitoba; it held town status prior to 1 January 2015. It is located on Highway 10 in the Parkland Region of Manitoba. At an elevation of approximately 632 metres (2,073 ft), Erickson is the highest settled place in Manitoba which is celebrated annually by the community's Altitude Festival. The main industry of Erickson is agriculture.

== History ==
The community was originally established as a Canadian Northern Railway point in 1905. When a post office was opened in 1908 it was known as Avesta. It was named after a town in south-central Sweden. Shortly after, the post office was moved near the railway station site, Erickson Station. The station had been named after the Postmaster, E. Albert Erickson.

== Demographics ==
In the 2021 Census of Population conducted by Statistics Canada, Erickson had a population of 473 living in 231 of its 268 total private dwellings, a change of 2.6% from its 2016 population of 461. With a land area of 1.29 km^{2} (0.50 sq mi), it had a population density of 366.7/km^{2} (949.7/sq mi) in 2021.
