= Franklin, Manitoba =

Coordinates: 50°14′44″N 99°39′57″W

Franklin is a community in Rural Municipality of Rosedale in the province of Manitoba in Western Canada. It is west of Neepawa, Manitoba, and was known as Bridge Creek, (or possibly Budge Creek), until 1890. It was then named Franklin and referred to a post office, a CPR midpoint and a school district so named. The origins of that name also are not clear, one source citing the U.S. president and another the explorer, Sir John Franklin.
