= Scandinavia, Manitoba =

Coordinates: 50.530°N 99.804°W

Scandinavia is a locality in the province of Manitoba, Canada. It is located in the northern portion of the Municipality of Clanwilliam – Erickson and south of Riding Mountain National Park. The Post Office was located on 7-18-17W and opened in 1886 with Jems Hemmingsen as postmaster. It closed in 1968. A School District of the same name was located on 6-18-17W.

The locality's name likely came from the early settlers or the postmaster and referred to the Scandinavian settlers who were the first European people to inhabit the area. The locality to the south of Scandinavia was Hilltop and was settled during the same period with mainly Swedish immigrants.
