= Municipality of Clanwilliam-Erickson =

Rural municipality in Manitoba, Canada

Clanwilliam – Erickson
- Rural municipality
- Municipality of Clanwilliam – Erickson
- Location of Clanwilliam – Erickson in Manitoba
- Coordinates: 50.499°N 99.915°W
- Country: Canada
- Province: Manitoba
- Region: Westman
- Incorporated (amalgamated): January 1, 2015

Area
  - Total: 358.05 km^{2} (138.24 sq mi)

Population (2021)
  - Total: 1,239
  - Density: 3.460/km^{2} (8.962/sq mi)
- Time zone: UTC-6 (CST)
  - Summer (DST): UTC-5 (CDT)
- Website: www.ericksonmb.ca

The Municipality of Clanwilliam – Erickson is a rural municipality (RM) in the Canadian province of Manitoba.

== History ==
The municipality was incorporated on January 1, 2015 via the amalgamation of the RM of Clanwilliam and the Town of Erickson. It was formed as a requirement of The Municipal Amalgamations Act, which required that municipalities with a population less than 1,000 amalgamate with one or more neighbouring municipalities by 2015. The Government of Manitoba initiated these amalgamations in order for municipalities to meet the 1997 minimum population requirement of 1,000 to incorporate a municipality.

== Communities ==
- Erickson
- Hilltop
- Scandinavia

== Demographics ==
In the 2021 Census of Population conducted by Statistics Canada, Clanwilliam-Erickson had a population of 1,012 living in 487 of its 834 total private dwellings, a change of 17.7% from its 2016 population of 860. With a land area of 358.05 km^{2} (138.24 sq mi), it had a population density of 2.8/km^{2} (7.3/sq mi) in 2021.
