= Rural Municipality of Minto-Odanah =

Rural municipality in Manitoba, Canada

Minto-Odanah
- Rural municipality
- Rural Municipality of Minto-Odanah
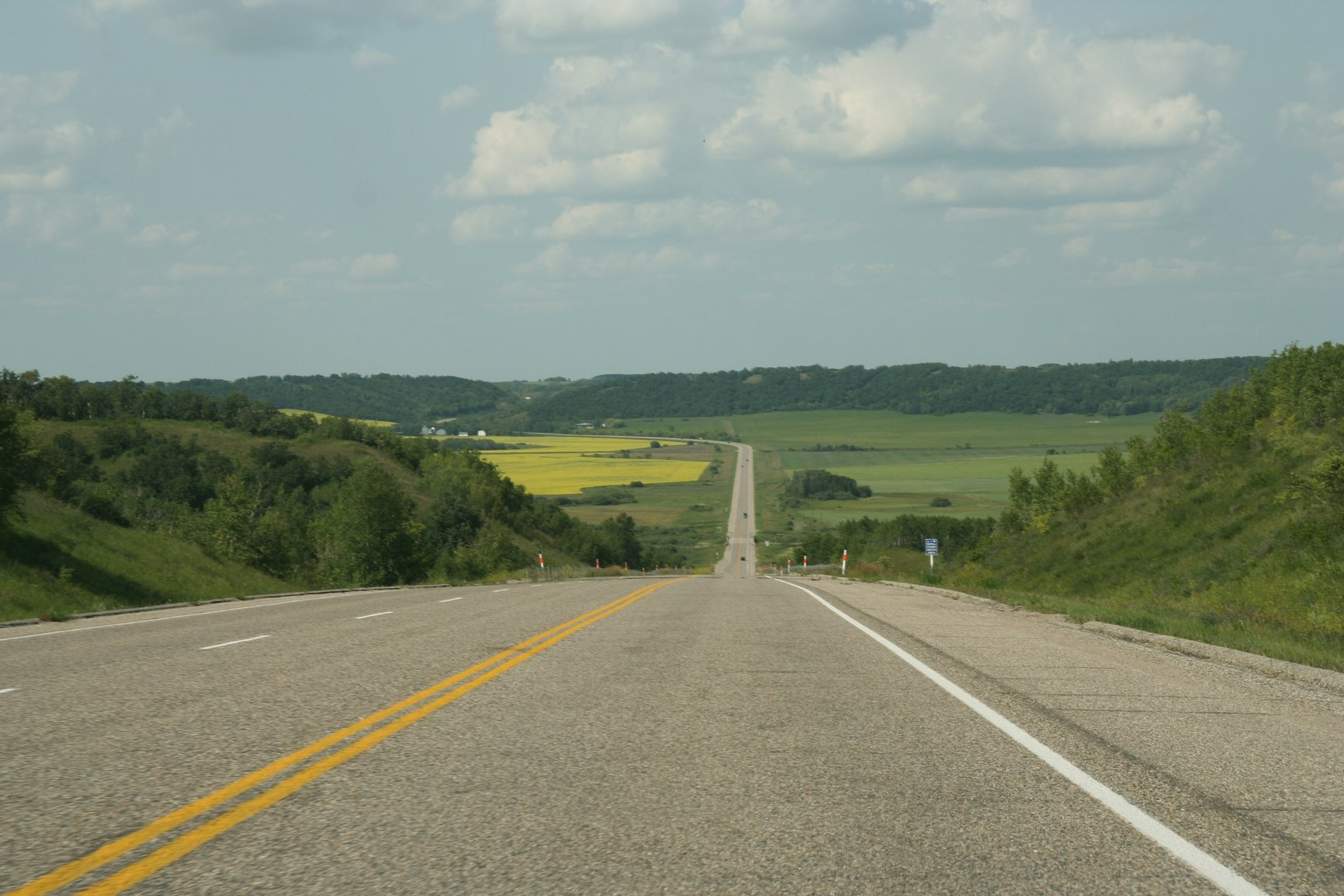

- Location of the RM of Minto-Odanah in Manitoba
- Coordinates: 50.233°N 99.784°W
- Country: Canada
- Province: Manitoba
- Region: Westman
- Incorporated (amalgamated): January 1, 2015

Population (2021)
  - Total: 1,121
- Time zone: UTC-6 (CST)
  - Summer (DST): UTC-5 (CDT)
- Website: www.minnedosa.com/m/rural-municipality-of-minto-odanah

The Rural Municipality of Minto-Odanah is a rural municipality (RM) in the Canadian province of Manitoba that incorporated on January 1, 2015, via the amalgamation of the RMs of Minto and Odanah. It was formed as a requirement of The Municipal Amalgamations Act, which required that municipalities with a population less than 1,000 amalgamate with one or more neighbouring municipalities by 2015. The Government of Manitoba initiated these amalgamations in order for municipalities to meet the 1997 minimum population requirement of 1,000 to incorporate a municipality.

== Demographics ==
In the 2021 Census of Population conducted by Statistics Canada, Minto-Odanah had a population of 1,121 living in 412 of its 454 total private dwellings, a change of −5.7% from its 2016 population of 1,189. With a land area of 746.31 km^{2} (288.15 sq mi), it had a population density of 1.5/km^{2} (3.9/sq mi) in 2021.
