= Arctic Bridge =

Seasonal sea route

The Arctic Bridge shipping route (blue line at map) is hoped to link North America to markets in Europe and Asia using ice-free routes across the Arctic Ocean

The Arctic Bridge or Arctic Sea Bridge is a seasonal sea route approximately 6,700 kilometres (4,200 mi; 3,600 NM) long linking Russia to Canada, specifically the Russian port of Murmansk to the Hudson Bay port of Churchill, Manitoba.

== Description ==
Churchill is the only principal seaport on Canada's northern coast and has no road connections to the rest of Canada. It is the northern terminus of the Hudson Bay Railway and is a useful link in the export of grain from the Canadian Prairies to European markets. The Russian gauge Murmansk Railway links the port of Murmansk on the ice-free Kola Bay to Saint Petersburg and the rest of Europe and to the rest of Russia by the M18 Kola Motorway.

Russia has shown a keen interest in developing the Arctic Bridge route and hopes to develop the link as part of its plan to build a "geostrategic bridge between Europe, Asia and North America". To this end, Russia is building railways and roads to link cities like Paris, Berlin, Tokyo and Beijing. If developed (along with the Northwest Passage) it could serve as a major trade route between Europe and North America. According to the Russian Federation's Ottawa press attaché, Sergey Khuduiakov, the retreat of Arctic ice has enabled the opening of the trade route. Currently, the route is only easily navigable about four months of the year.

== History ==
The concept of an "Arctic Bridge", with a hub in Churchill, was proposed by Canadians in the early 1990s. In 1997 the port of Churchill was sold to Denver-based OmniTRAX, a major railroad operator. In 2004, OmniTRAX entered into talks with the Murmansk Shipping Company to promote the Arctic Bridge concept. While the Canadian Wheat Board (CWB) had been able to keep Churchill a viable port, exporting nearly 400,000 tons (15 million bushels) of wheat each year, OmniTRAX has had difficulty in landing imports at Churchill. On October 17, 2007, the first shipment of fertilizer from Murmansk arrived at the Port of Churchill. Two separate 9000 tonne imports of Russian fertilizer arrived in 2008, purchased by the Farmers of North America cooperative of Saskatoon from Kaliningrad.

The port of Churchill exported 710,000 tonnes of grain in 1977, 621,000 tonnes in 2007, and 529,000 tonnes in 2009.

The CWB was sold off to Saudi Company, G3 Global Grain Group in 2015 and the Churchill Port suffered as grain shipments were slowly ceased. Omnitrax then closed the rail-line and port, citing a lack of profitability of the operations. They then entered into initial talks to sell the port and rail-line to a local indigenous consortium of Manitoba First Nations, Missinippi Rail Consortium.

== See also ==
- Northwest Passage
- Northern Sea Route also known as the Northeast Passage
- Northern East West Freight Corridor
- Arctic Gateway Group
