= Port of Churchill =

Port in Manitoba, Canada

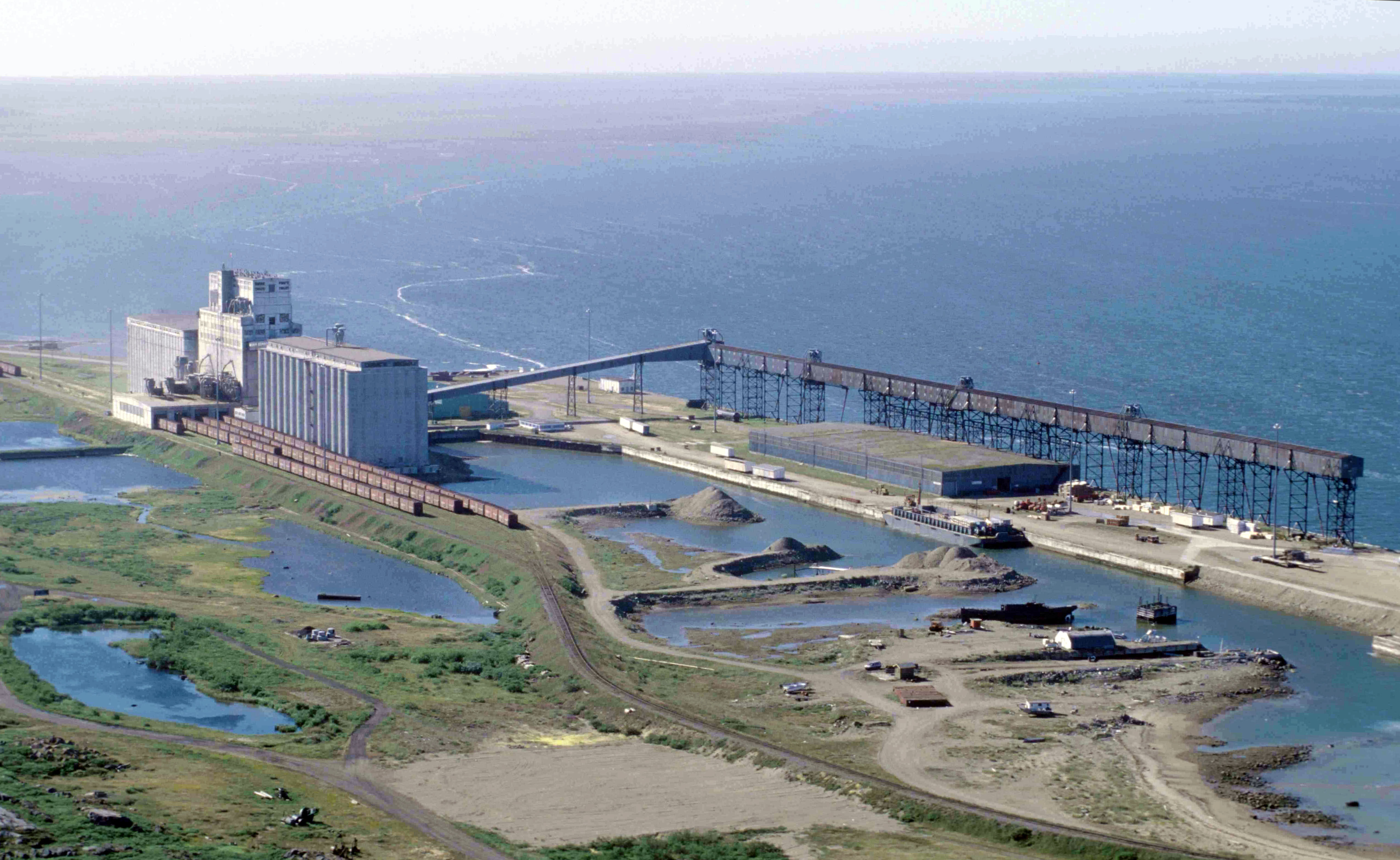
- Aerial view of the port in 1996
- Interactive map of Port of Churchill
- Location within Manitoba

Location
- Country: Canada
- Location: Churchill, Manitoba
- Coordinates: 58°46′45″N 94°11′36″W
- UN/LOCODE: CACHV

Details
- Opened: 1931
- Owned by: Arctic Gateway Group LP
- No. of berths: 4
- Draft depth: 17.0 m.

Statistics
- Website arcticgateway.com/port-of-churchill

The Port of Churchill is a privately owned port on Hudson Bay in Churchill, Manitoba, Canada. Routes from the port connect to the North Atlantic through the Hudson Strait. As of 2008, the port had four deep-sea berths capable of handling Panamax-size vessels for the loading and unloading of grain, bulk commodities, general cargo, and tanker vessels. The port is the northern terminus of the Hudson Bay Railway, which shares the same parent company (Arctic Gateway Group), and cargo connections are made with the Canadian National Railway system at HBR's southern terminus in The Pas. It is the only port of its size and scope in Canada that does not connect directly to the country's road system; all goods shipped overland to and from the port must travel by rail.

== History ==
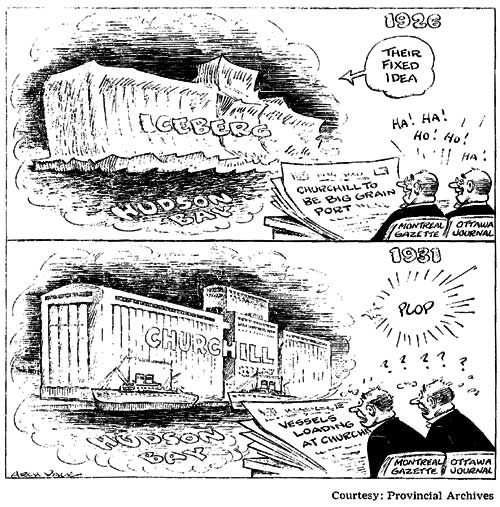
A political cartoon by Arch Dale depicting the Montreal Gazette and Ottawa Journal laughing at the idea of Churchill becoming a grain port in 1926, and being stunned at the results in 1931.

The port was built in the late 1920s by the Government of Canada and began exporting grain shipments in 1931, following a six-year project to build the railway to connect Hudson Bay to other points in Canada for use in shipping. The first ship to import cargo through the port was the British freighter Pennyworth in 1932.

=== OmniTRAX ownership ===
The port remained under federal government ownership until its sale in 1997 to the American company OmniTRAX for $10. In December 2015, OmniTRAX announced it was negotiating a sale of the port, and the associated Hudson Bay Railway, to a group of First Nations based in northern Manitoba. With no sale finalized by July 2016, OmniTRAX shut down the port and major railroad freight operations along the HBR in August 2016. The port and all freight railway service to the port was shut down in August 2016 following the Government of Canada's decision to end the Canadian Wheat Board's monopsony on grains from western Canada, which subsequently allowed farmers to sell grain on the open market and shift to using lower-cost non-Arctic ports.

The railway continued to carry cargo to supply the town of Churchill itself until the line was damaged by flooding on May 23, 2017.

=== Arctic Gateway Group ownership ===
The Port and the Hudson Bay Railway were sold to Arctic Gateway Group — a consortium of First Nations, local governments, and corporate investors — in 2018. After purchasing the port and related infrastructure in 2018, the Arctic Gateway Group repaired the rail line before winter set in, lowering the cost of goods in Churchill.

On September 7, 2019, the Arctic Gateway Group announced that it had successfully completed the loading of its first grain ship since operations were ceased in 2016. On July 9, 2019, ships on missions to resupply arctic communities began stopping at the port for additional cargo, and the port began shipping grain again on September 7, 2019.

The port and railway came under complete community and Indigenous ownership in 2021, after AGT Food and Ingredients and Fairfax Financial transferred their shares in Arctic Gateway to OneNorth – a consortium of community and Indigenous partners which owned the other fifty-percent of Arctic Gateway's shares.

=== Upgrade projects ===
Due to the 2025 United States trade war with Canada and Mexico, proposals to expand the Port of Churchill to accommodate Canadian Trade with Europe and Asia have become prominent in federal and provincial politics. Bill C-5, an Act to enact the Free Trade and Labour Mobility in Canada Act and the Building Canada Act, passed in Spring of 2025, opening up the possibility for significant investments. Prime Minister Mark Carney and Manitoba Premier Wab Kinew has signaled that renovations the Port of Churchill would be a priority for their governments. The Government of Canada committed $175 million over five years (starting in 2025-2026) for the Hudson Bay Railway and port expansion activities.

In 2025, the Churchill Port Plus project was proposed before the federal government. The project included upgrading the port's capacity for cargo and adding new LNG terminal.

In 2026, prospects for building LNG export terminal were discussed between the Manitoba and federal governments.

== Port operations ==
The port is iced in for much of the year and is accessible only between late July and early November. For example, in 2010 the shipping season was July 28 to November 2. Shallow waters also restrict its development as an ocean port. Despite these restrictions the port remains useful for shipping grain and other bulk cargo because shipping by rail costs several times as much, per ton, as shipping by sea.

The port is a compulsory pilotage area. Pilotage is provided by the Great Lakes Pilotage Authority, a Crown corporation of the Government of Canada which includes responsibility for pilotage on the Hudson Bay coast of the provinces of Ontario and Manitoba. Pilotage charges between July 20 and October 31 follow a published schedule; outside these dates charges are based on cost recovery.

In 2026, the premier of Manitoba proposed extending the port's shipping season by nine months or more by employing icebreakers, and taking advantage of the warming climate which reduces sea ice. He proposed acquiring icebreakers costing $100 million to $410 million each and using bulk carriers designed for icy conditions costing $60 million to $70 million each. The federal government is considering the proposal but is not making it a priority.

=== Grain shipment ===
From 1931 to 2016, the port typically was used for outgoing shipments of grain, usually from the Canadian Wheat Board.

Since 2007, port activity diversified somewhat and increased in line with growth in Arctic mining operations in Nunavut and an expansion in supply ship reloading. In September 2007 the port handled its first domestic export trade, shipping 12,500 tonnes of wheat to Halifax aboard the Arctic supply ship Kathryn Spirit. On October 18, 2007 the port received its first import trade in seven years and the first ever from Russia, a shipment of fertilizer purchased by Farmers of North America. The shipment is supposed to be the beginning of an Arctic Bridge that would link Churchill with the Russian port of Murmansk.

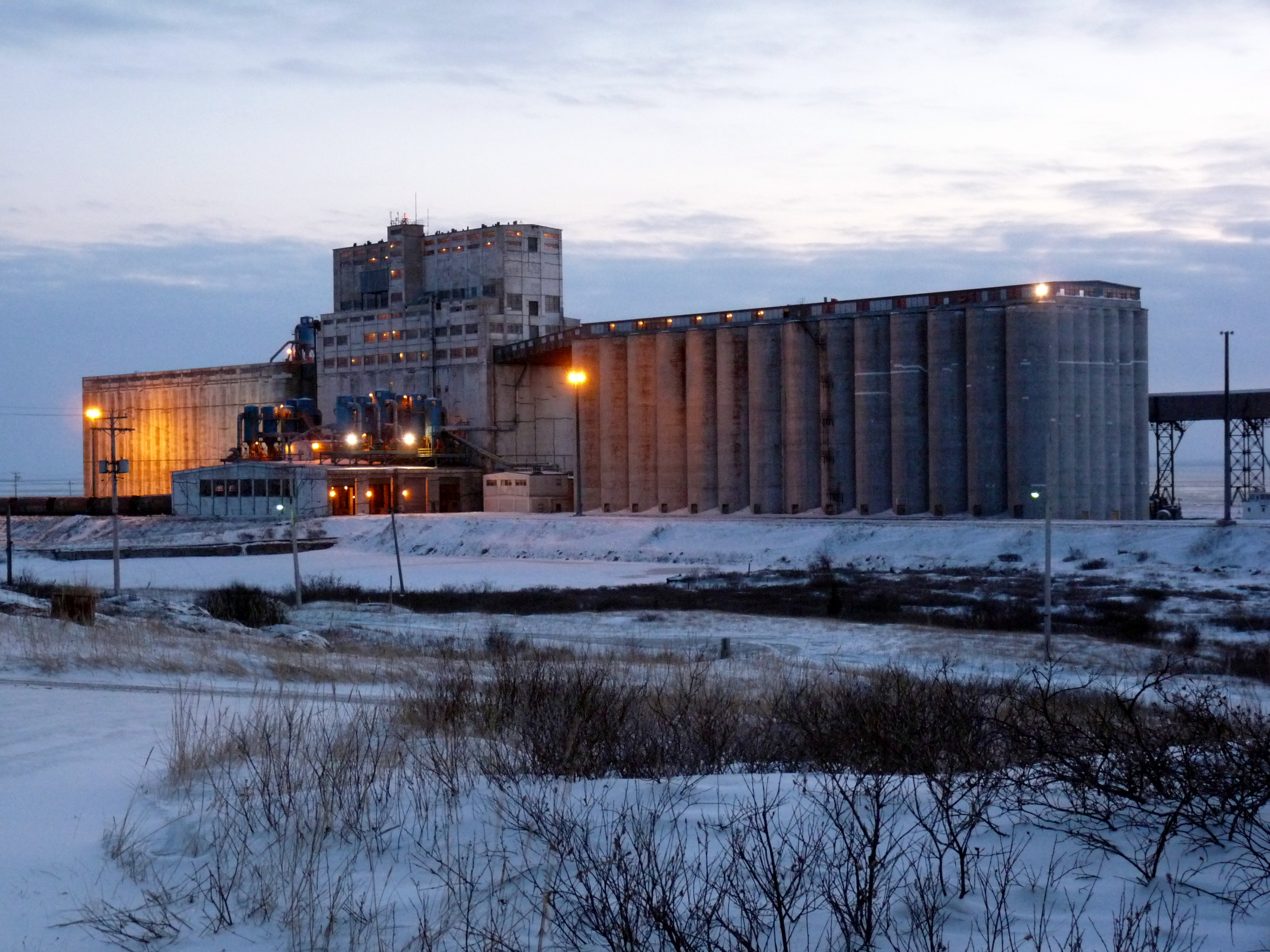
View of the port's facilities and grain elevators from the east.

The port was almost entirely reliant on grain from the Canadian Wheat Board (CWB) for its viability. Wheat accounted for 90 per cent of all traffic through the port. According to a November 6, 2008 press release, the CWB shipped 424,000 tons of western Canadian wheat through the port of Churchill during the 2008 shipping season. The first wheat left port on August 8, and the last of 15 freighters left on October 20. Exporting prairie wheat through Churchill saves Canadian farmers money on transportation in terms of rail-freight costs and avoiding Saint Lawrence Seaway charges, but the operating profits to the private company operating the port were highly dependent on the monopoly rates and rules implemented by the CWB. The CWB incentivized shipments via the port through the use of its Churchill Storage Program which paid farmers to retain grain on-farm for later movement through the port. Because the Churchill shipping season begins before the new wheat crop is harvested each summer, the Storage Program helped ensure adequate volumes of grain are available for export by bringing in grain saved from the year before.

The port of Churchill exported 710,000 t (700,000 long tons; 780,000 short tons) of grain in 1977, 621,000 t (611,000 long tons; 685,000 short tons) in 2007, and 529,000 t (521,000 long tons; 583,000 short tons) in 2009. Shipments continued to decline, falling to 432,434 t (425,604 long tons; 476,677 short tons) in 2012 and plummeting to 186,000 t (183,000 long tons; 205,000 short tons) in 2015. Port operations ceased in August 2016.

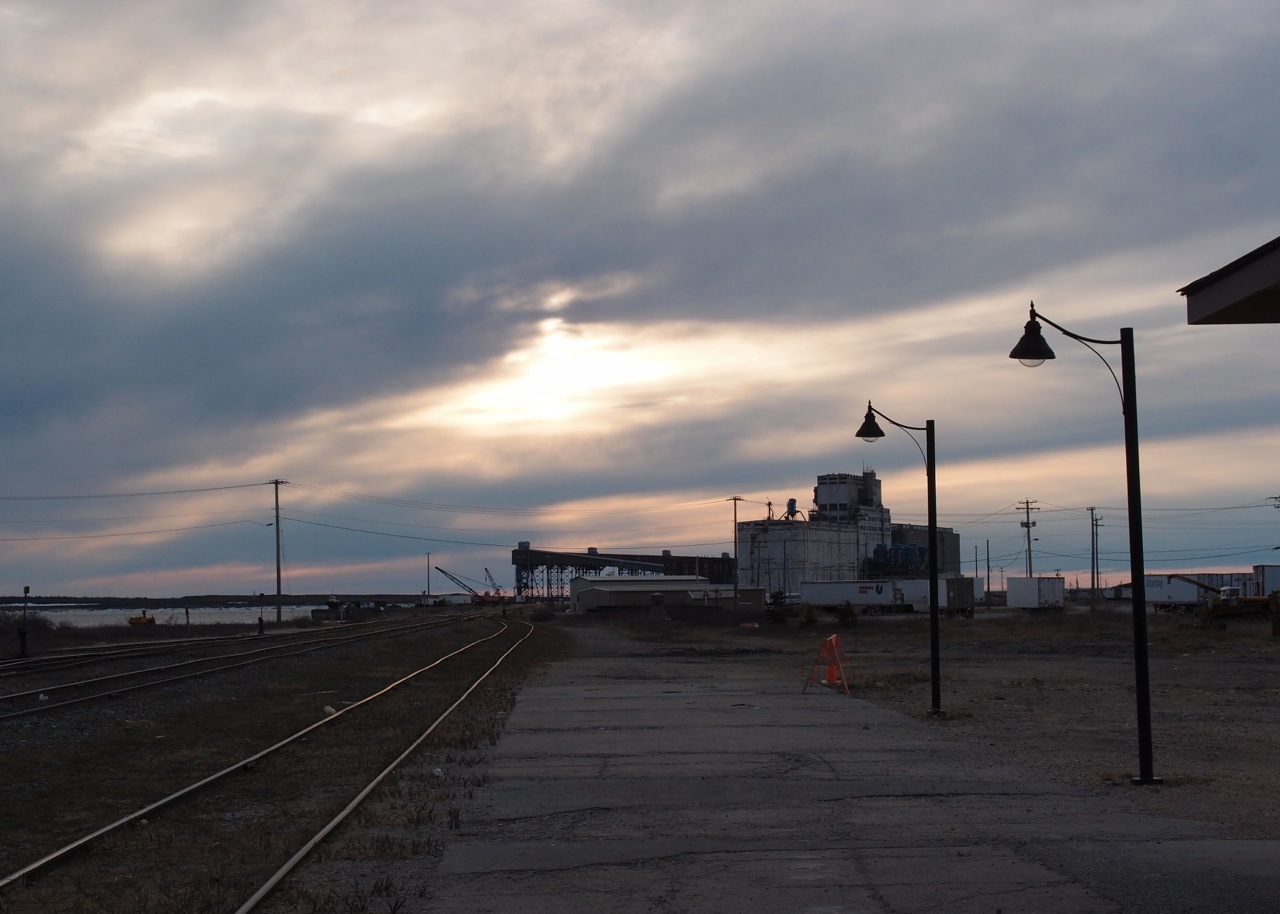
The rail station at the Port of Churchill

The CWB was sold off to Saudi Company, G3 Global Grain Group in 2015 and the Churchill Port suffered as grain shipments were slowly ceased. OmniTRAX then closed the rail-line and port, citing profitability of the operations. It then entered into initial talks to sell the port and rail-line to a local indigenous consortium of Manitoba First Nations, Missinippi Rail Consortium.

Under the new ownership of the Arctic Gateway Group, the port completed the loading of its first grain ship on September 7, 2019. It was announced on September 16 that the port has begun loading a second ship.

During the 2020 Covid-19 Pandemic the grain exports ceased for six years, before resuming again in 2026 with 30 000 tonnes of durum wheat on board the first of three ships planned for the 2026 season.

=== Alternatives to grain ===
The government of Manitoba proposed in 2010 that the Port of Churchill could serve as the North American terminus of an Arctic Bridge shipping service to Murmansk in Northern Russia. Containers from inland China and central Asia could potentially be transported to Murmansk by Russian railways, shipped to Churchill, then transported south by rail to major destinations in North America, avoiding existing transport bottlenecks.

In 2010, investments to upgrade the port to "facilitating export options and the flow of two-way trade with other Northern ports" were made, as described in the Statement on Canada's Arctic Foreign Policy: Exercising : Sovereignty and Promoting Canada's Northern Strategy Abroad which is launched on August 20, 2010.

Canada is the world's fourth-largest oil exporter, and the Port of Churchill has an oil-handling system. In 2013, the port's previous owner had proposed a $2 million upgrade to this system, which would have given additional competitive advantage to Canada's oil export industry. A trial-run to export of 330,000 bbl of light-sweet crude was proposed at that time. However, by 2014 the plan had been scrapped.

On July 9, 2019, the port began supplying cargo to ships on their way to resupply northern communities.

In August 2024 the cargo shipment of critical minerals from the port was restored for the first time in twenty years with a ship of zinc concentrate.

2026 saw the first potash shipment of 20 tonnes exported from Port of Churchill to Europe, while the zinc concentrate export continued too.

== Marketing efforts ==
The Churchill Gateway Development Corporation was created in 2003 to market the port and diversify its traffic base. The port's official web site www.PortOfChurchill.ca contains promotional information for visitors to the area.

== Climate ==
The area has a subarctic climate (Köppen climate classification: Dfc) with long, very cold winters, and short, cool to mild summers. Churchill's winters are colder than a location at a latitude of 58 degrees north should warrant, given its coastal location. The shallow Hudson Bay freezes, eliminating any maritime moderation. Prevailing northerly winds from the North Pole jet across the frozen bay, leading to a January average of −26.0 °C (−14.8 °F). Juneau, Alaska, by contrast, is also at 58 degrees north but is moderated by the warmer and deeper Pacific Ocean. Juneau's −3.5 °C (25.7 °F) January average temperature is a full 22.5 °C (40.5 °F) warmer than Churchill's. Yet in summer, when the Hudson Bay thaws, Churchill's summer is moderated.

Churchill's 12.7 °C (54.9 °F) July average temperature is similar to Juneau's 13.8 °C (56.8 °F) July average.

Climate data for Churchill (Churchill Airport) Climate ID: 5060600; coordinates 58°44′21″N 94°03′59″W; elevation: 29.3 m (96 ft); 1991−2020 normals, extremes 1929−present
| Month | Jan | Feb | Mar | Apr | May | Jun | Jul | Aug | Sep | Oct | Nov | Dec | Year |
|---|---|---|---|---|---|---|---|---|---|---|---|---|---|
| Record high humidex | 1.2 | 1.7 | 8.3 | 28.0 | 30.7 | 36.5 | 39.7 | 44.2 | 34.1 | 23.0 | 5.5 | 2.8 | 44.2 |
| Record high °C (°F) | 1.7 (35.1) | 1.8 (35.2) | 9.0 (48.2) | 28.2 (82.8) | 28.9 (84.0) | 32.2 (90.0) | 36.9 (98.4) | 34.5 (94.1) | 29.2 (84.6) | 21.7 (71.1) | 7.2 (45.0) | 3.0 (37.4) | 36.9 (98.4) |
| Mean daily maximum °C (°F) | −21.2 (−6.2) | −20.0 (−4.0) | −13.7 (7.3) | −5.0 (23.0) | 2.9 (37.2) | 12.8 (55.0) | 18.2 (64.8) | 16.7 (62.1) | 10.4 (50.7) | 1.8 (35.2) | −8.3 (17.1) | −17.0 (1.4) | −1.9 (28.6) |
| Daily mean °C (°F) | −25.3 (−13.5) | −24.3 (−11.7) | −18.6 (−1.5) | −9.7 (14.5) | −0.9 (30.4) | 7.6 (45.7) | 13.0 (55.4) | 12.5 (54.5) | 7.1 (44.8) | −0.7 (30.7) | −12.0 (10.4) | −20.9 (−5.6) | −6.0 (21.2) |
| Mean daily minimum °C (°F) | −29.2 (−20.6) | −28.5 (−19.3) | −23.5 (−10.3) | −14.4 (6.1) | −4.7 (23.5) | 2.5 (36.5) | 7.8 (46.0) | 8.2 (46.8) | 3.7 (38.7) | −3.2 (26.2) | −15.8 (3.6) | −24.8 (−12.6) | −10.2 (13.6) |
| Record low °C (°F) | −45.6 (−50.1) | −45.4 (−49.7) | −43.9 (−47.0) | −34.0 (−29.2) | −25.2 (−13.4) | −9.4 (15.1) | −2.2 (28.0) | −2.2 (28.0) | −11.7 (10.9) | −24.5 (−12.1) | −36.1 (−33.0) | −43.9 (−47.0) | −45.6 (−50.1) |
| Record low wind chill | −64.4 | −62.6 | −61.4 | −56.6 | −37.1 | −12.7 | −6.9 | −6.2 | −16.7 | −35.5 | −51.1 | −58.5 | −64.4 |
| Average precipitation mm (inches) | 14.7 (0.58) | 13.8 (0.54) | 14.1 (0.56) | 15.8 (0.62) | 25.2 (0.99) | 42.0 (1.65) | 74.0 (2.91) | 80.5 (3.17) | 74.9 (2.95) | 49.9 (1.96) | 28.9 (1.14) | 14.9 (0.59) | 447.7 (17.63) |
| Average rainfall mm (inches) | 0.0 (0.0) | 0.0 (0.0) | 0.4 (0.02) | 1.1 (0.04) | 16.1 (0.63) | 41.0 (1.61) | 59.8 (2.35) | 69.3 (2.73) | 66.0 (2.60) | 20.9 (0.82) | 1.3 (0.05) | 0.1 (0.00) | 276.0 (10.87) |
| Average snowfall cm (inches) | 21.7 (8.5) | 19.3 (7.6) | 20.4 (8.0) | 24.9 (9.8) | 15.5 (6.1) | 3.3 (1.3) | 0.0 (0.0) | 0.0 (0.0) | 4.2 (1.7) | 29.8 (11.7) | 39.2 (15.4) | 22.9 (9.0) | 201.2 (79.2) |
| Average precipitation days (≥ 0.2 mm) | 12.2 | 10.9 | 10.2 | 8.8 | 9.9 | 11.7 | 14.5 | 16.7 | 16.5 | 16.7 | 15.7 | 13.1 | 156.8 |
| Average rainy days (≥ 0.2 mm) | 0.09 | 0.05 | 0.45 | 1.4 | 5.1 | 10.7 | 13.9 | 14.9 | 14.5 | 6.5 | 0.91 | 0.24 | 67.5 |
| Average snowy days (≥ 0.2 cm) | 11.9 | 10.3 | 11.1 | 8.3 | 6.7 | 1.5 | 0.0 | 0.06 | 2.6 | 11.6 | 15.6 | 12.3 | 92.1 |
| Average relative humidity (%) (at 1500 LST) | 70.5 | 68.5 | 69.9 | 73.2 | 75.8 | 66.4 | 65.3 | 69.0 | 72.1 | 80.1 | 82.3 | 75.5 | 72.4 |
| Average dew point °C (°F) | −30.2 (−22.4) | −28.5 (−19.3) | −22.0 (−7.6) | −11.3 (11.7) | −3.5 (25.7) | 2.7 (36.9) | 7.4 (45.3) | 7.5 (45.5) | 2.4 (36.3) | −3.3 (26.1) | −13.8 (7.2) | −25.1 (−13.2) | −9.8 (14.3) |
| Mean monthly sunshine hours | 79.7 | 117.7 | 177.8 | 198.2 | 197.0 | 243.0 | 281.7 | 225.9 | 112.0 | 58.1 | 55.3 | 53.1 | 1,799.5 |
| Percentage possible sunshine | 36.2 | 45.1 | 48.7 | 45.8 | 37.7 | 44.3 | 51.6 | 47.2 | 29.0 | 18.2 | 23.5 | 26.7 | 37.8 |
Source: Environment and Climate Change Canada (rain/rain days, snow/snow days 1981–2010) (dew point 1300 LST 1951–1980) Canadian Climate Normals 1951–1980
