= Hudson Bay Railway (1910) =

Railway line in Manitoba, Canada

Overview
- Headquarters: Winnipeg
- Locale: Manitoba, Saskatchewan
- Dates of operation: 1910–1929

Technical
- Track gauge: 4 ft 8 1/2 in (1,435 mm) standard gauge

The Hudson Bay Railway (HBR) is a historic rail line in Manitoba, Canada, to the shore of Hudson Bay. The venture began as a line between Winnipeg in the south and Churchill, and/or Port Nelson, in the north. However, HBR came to describe the final section between The Pas and Churchill.

== History ==
=== Early endeavours ===
The Hudson's Bay Company (HBC) pioneered the Bay as an important trade route from the 1680s. By the late 1800s, the landlocked Canadian Prairies envisioned the Bay as a more economical outlet for wheat exports. Robert Bell's 1875–1880 surveys listed the advantages of a rail line. Although the Canadian Pacific Railway (CPR) monopoly clause would block most Manitoba charter applications in the early 1880s, the federal government approved two charters in 1880, one for the Nelson Valley Railway and Transportation Company for a line from Lake Winnipeg to the mouth of the Churchill River, the other for the Winnipeg and Hudson Bay Railway and Steamship Company to build from Winnipeg to Port Nelson. Financial constraints forced an 1883 merger under the former name, changed to The Winnipeg and Hudson Bay Railway Company in 1887, and the Winnipeg and Great Northern Railway Company (WGNR) in 1894. An 1884 charter enhancement provided a federal land grant of 12,800 acres per mile (deemed worth 50 cents per acre) above the 54th parallel, but 6,400 acres per mile ($1 per acre) for below.

Charter owner Hugh McKay Sutherland, unable to attract financing for the risky venture, accepted a bloated contract bid from the Mann and Holt partnership in 1886. The contractors, who provided all financing, were secured by the issue of company stock and bonds. Possibly for financing purposes, Ross and Mackenzie joined the partnership when a further contract was signed in 1891. That year, to promote action, the government added an $80,000 a year contract for mail carrying, etc., when the line reached the Saskatchewan River. Although construction progress was toward the east of Lake Manitoba, the government preference became a western route, but this policy was omitted from the 1891 legislation.

Foreseeable traffic volumes east of the lake were unlikely to recover the inflated construction bid. After Sutherland breached the contract, the partners seized $400,000 in company bonds, but completed only 64 kilometres (40 mi) from the junction at Gross Isle to Oak Point (Shoal Lake). This distance enabled the contractors to receive $256,000 in Manitoba provincial debentures (immediately cashable by selling). In exchange, the government was to receive 256,000 acres of the federal land grant. However, the line failed a federal inspection and no land grants were issued for the project, leaving Manitoba unreimbursed for several years. The federal government rejected a 1894 proposal from Mann and Onderdonk to build the line.

In 1895, Mackenzie and Mann thwarted possible government action that could violate their vested interests in the HBR. First was an attempt by Sutherland to employ another contractor to continue the project. Second was the federal proposal to change the HBR route to west of the lake. In the 1896 charter amendment to reactivate progress, the $80,000 mail contract was split, so that $40,000 was payable after reaching half way, and the balance payable on reaching the river. Furthermore, if Sutherland proved unable to reactivate the project, the first $40,000 would pass to another contender, which happened to be Mackenzie and Mann's Lake Manitoba Railway and Canal Company (LMR or Dauphin railway). Mann acquired control of the HBR charter, possibly in full settlement of the outstanding construction claim. The partners continued to employ Sutherland as an executive agent for many years in dealing with local politicians. However at this time, Sutherland incorrectly claimed the old HBR main line would continue east of the lake, cross at the isthmus, and intersect the Dauphin railway (which he regarded as a branch line) between Lake Dauphin & Lake Winnipegosis. The aspirations of the Winnipeg and North-western Railway, chartered in 1907 to build such a line, which would then instead extend farther westward, came to nought. The old HBR line was initially to nowhere, and ultimately not part of the final route, but in 1912, Mackenzie and Mann extended this stub north to Gypsumville.

=== Progressive extensions ===
Branching from the LMR line at Sifton Junction, track laying northwest commenced in August 1898. The former HBR land grants, and a federal guarantee of bonds issued up to $12,000 per mile, were available to extend the LMR line farther northward. In addition, Manitoba guaranteed bonds at 4% for 30 years for up to $8,000 per mile ($5,000/km), and exempted earnings on the line from taxes for the same 30 years. Two conditions were the province would receive one third of the land grant volume from the then northern boundary of Manitoba to the Saskatchewan River, and 256,000 acres (1,040 km^{2}) owing from the old HBR, all such land to be selected from within the then Manitoba. Work commenced in May 1898. By the end of the season in December, the steel reached 5 kilometres (3 mi) beyond Duck River at today's Cowan.

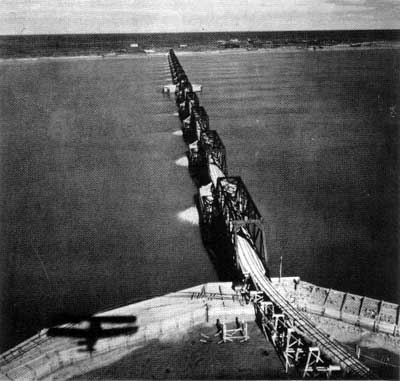
The width of the mouth of the shallow and silty Nelson River required Port Nelson's harbour facilities to be built on an artificial island at the end of an 800-metre (2,600 ft) causeway.

In December 1898, the emerging rail network became the Canadian Northern Railway (CNoR). A new federal charter granted the following year comprised extensive new routes.

During May to the beginning of October 1899, track laying extended 50 kilometres (31 mi) to Swan River. The next year, tracks extended 150 kilometres (93 mi) to Erwood, Saskatchewan. It is unclear if the weekly train from Swan River to Erwood ran regularly after 1904. Prompted by the federal government, further work began in 1907. In 1908, the line from Winnipeg reached the banks of the Saskatchewan River at The Pas.

=== Final leg ===
CNoR refused to build further north without massive government assistance. That year, the Government of Canada committed to constructing a line north from The Pas, and in 1910 the Hudson Bay Railway was formed. Mackenzie and Mann, the successful bidders, bridged the river in 1910–1911, and between 1910 and the start of World War I in 1914, laid steel 538 kilometres (334 mi) to Kettle Rapids (located at present day Gillam). Port Nelson, 160 kilometres (100 mi) away, had been selected as the terminus owing to the shorter distance and easier terrain. The town site was cleared and infrastructure erected from 1912, and the completed rail bed reached there, but resources diverted for the war effort limited the latter project. All town and railway construction ceased in 1917, leaving a ghost town.

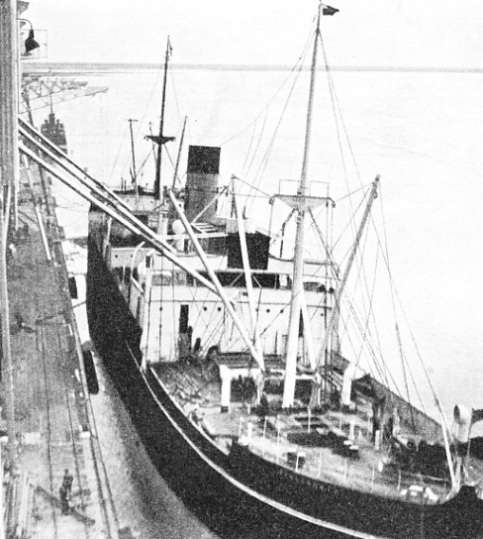
The Pennyworth, moored in Churchill in 1933. In 1932 she was first freighter to use the port.

In 1915, the Canadian Government Railways assumed administration of the line. To resolve CNoR's dire financial predicament, the federal government effectively took control of the company in 1917. Both the line and CNoR later merged into Canadian National Railway (CNR).

In 1925 developers sponsored an excursion to Port Nelson, to attract investors to finance the continuation of the route. Early Canadian filmmaker Frank Holmes directed a 52-minute film, Seaport of the Prairies, documenting the endeavour. Participants included Charles Frederick Gray, the Mayor of Winnipeg, and William Ivens, an MLA, and J.L. Thomas, founder of the North Country Tourist Association. Development opportunities included ore resources, pulp and paper, hydro-electric, and grain shipping.

In 1926, the Department of Railways and Canals assumed control of the HBR from CNR. Following a new location survey and better port surveys in 1927 carried out by the engineer in charge of location John Leslie Charles, Churchill was substituted as the terminus, owing to its natural harbour. Work recommenced, but minimal maintenance during the intervening years had left the line in a state of disrepair, limiting safe use to the first 344 kilometres (214 mi). Political interference, financing difficulties, and engineering challenges – caused by the large amount of muskeg and frequent rock outcrops on the Canadian Shield – led to numerous delays. The line to Churchill was completed March 29, 1929, and it opened for traffic on September 10. Port facilities were completed in 1931, and the British freighter Pennyworth was the first vessel to berth.

The Hudson Bay Railway name disappeared when the line became part of the CNR system. CNR subsequently helped develop northern resources by building spurs from The Pas to Flin Flon, opening in 1928, followed by an extension on this line from Cranberry Portage to Lynn Lake, opening November 9, 1953. Although the HBR never became a major grain-handling link, it provided transportation to areas still inaccessible by road.

During World War II, plans to downgrade the line changed when the US military required it to handle 300 cars per day and stationed about 7,000 service personnel at Churchill and along the route.

In 1997, a new Hudson Bay Railway was formed after sale of the line from the Canadian National Railway. The current company operates over all of the original company's track.

== See also ==
- Canadian Government Railways
- Canadian National Railway
- Canadian Northern Railway
- Hudson Bay Railway (1997)
- North-West Mounted Police in the Canadian north
- Winnipeg – Churchill train
