= Hudson Bay Railway =

Hudson Bay Railway refers to two separate companies with the same name:

- Hudson Bay Railway (1910) organized in 1910 to build a railway line to the shore of Hudson Bay.
- Hudson Bay Railway (1997), a short line railway organized in 1997 to operate a railway line divested by CN Rail
