= Graham Bell =

Graham Bell may refer to:

- Alexander Graham Bell (1847–1922), Scottish-born Canadian-American inventor of the telephone
- Graham Bell (artist) (1910–1943), South African painter and journalist
- Graham Bell (police officer) (1946–2025), New Zealand police officer and television presenter
- Graham Bell (singer) (1948–2008), English pop and rock singer
- Graham Bell (biologist) (born 1949), English-Canadian evolutionary biologist
- Graham Bell (footballer) (born 1955), English footballer
- Graham Bell (skier) (born 1966), Olympic skier, TV presenter
- Graham Bell (duo), Israeli DJ duo
- Graham Bell (advocate), Scottish lawyer
- Graham E. Bell, American amateur astronomer

== See also ==
- Graeme Bell (1914–2012), Australian pianist and composer
- Graeme Bell (Canadian football) (born 1980), Canadian football fullback
- CGS Graham Bell, a 1929 tugboat shipwreck beached at Churchill Manitoba
