= Snow Lake lithium mine =

Proposed mine in Manitoba, Canada

Snow Lake lithium mine is a proposed lithium mine expected to be located on a 55,000-acre site 400 miles north of Winnipeg, Canada. The mine is proposed to be operated using 100% electric power, via hydropower and electric equipment. The mine intends to process the lithium ore into 6% spodumene. It signed a memorandum of understanding to supply Korean battery maker LG, at a nearby hydroxide processing plant.

The company hopes to supply around 160,000 tons of spodumene per year. The mine is planned to open in 2025 or 2026.

It will be a hard rock mine rather than processing lithium brine.

Electric mining equipment is to be supplied by Swedish company Epiroc.

The mine's 160,000-ton output is hoped to be sufficient to make batteries for around 500,000 electric cars annually.

The site is near the Arctic Gateway railway which offers transport to US manufacturing centers.

== Company ==
Snow Lake Resources Ltd. ($LITM) is a public company formed in 2018. The land was acquired in 2016 by Australian exploration company Nova Minerals Ltd., Snow Lake Lithium's majority shareholder.
