= Murad Al-Katib =

Canadian agricultural entrepreneur (born 1972)

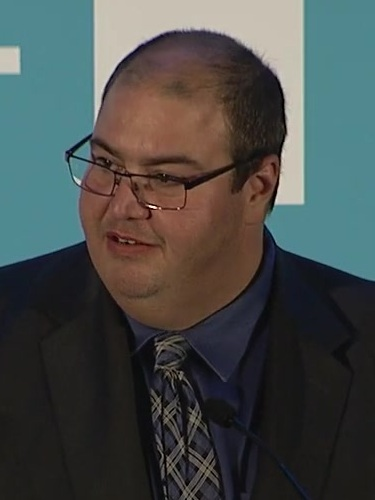
- Al-Katib in 2018
- Born: 1972 (age 53–54); Davidson, Saskatchewan, Canada
- Education: University of Saskatchewan (BComm), Thunderbird School of Global Management (MBA)
- Occupation: Entrepreneur
- Known for: Developing a global vertically-integrated supply chain for pulses
- Title: President and CEO of AGT Food and Ingredients Inc.

Murad Al-Katib (born 1972) is a Canadian agricultural entrepreneur and the president and CEO of AGT Food and Ingredients Inc. Al-Katib has built a global vertically-integrated supply chain for pulses, making plant-based proteins an integral Saskatchewan export. He has been called the "Lentil King of Saskatchewan". Murad Al-Katib received the Lifetime Achievement Award from the University of Saskatchewan Alumni Association in 2024 and the Oslo Business for Peace Award in 2017.

== Early life and education ==
Murad Al-Katib was born in Davidson, Saskatchewan, Canada in 1972. His parents immigrated to Saskatchewan from Turkey in 1969. In addition to developing a family farm, his father, Fatih Al-Katib, was the local doctor. His mother, Feyhan Al-Katib, learned English by watching Sesame Street with her children. She eventually became a municipal councilor and town mayor.

Murad Al-Katib attended Edwards School of Business at the University of Saskatchewan, earning his Bachelor of Commerce in 1994. He then attended the Thunderbird School of Global Management, earning his Masters of Business Administration. After graduation, he worked at the Canadian embassy in Washington, D.C.

== Career ==
After writing a letter to Roy Romanow, then premier of Saskatchewan, outlining his ideas for emerging markets and continuous crop rotation of cereals and legumes, Al-Katib was hired to work with the Saskatchewan Trade and Export Partnership (STEP) program. Pulse crops such as lentils, peas, beans and chickpeas work as "nitrogen-fixers", adding nutrients back into soil that is depleted by the planting of cereal crops and the use of nitrogen fertilizers. By alternating planting of protein-rich pulses with oilseed and cereal crops, farmers were able to improve soil quality without relying on the use of nitrogen fertilizers and the practice of leaving fields fallow during intervening years.

In 2001, Al-Katib left his position with STEP to establish his own pulse-processing company in Regina, Saskatchewan. His first plant opened under the name SaskCan two years later. He received funding from the Arslan family of Turkey, owners of the Arbel group, a Turkish pulse-processing company. Al-Katib has continued a pattern of research and expansion, eventually developing a vertically-integrated supply chain for pulses, and making plant-based proteins a major Saskatchewan export.

As of 2014, his company was renamed AGT Food and Ingredients Inc. AGT now has more than 46 facilities for manufacturing and processing lentils, peas, beans and chickpeas, on five continents. 22 of its facilities are in Western Canada. AGT has become the largest agricultural container shipper in the world, sending food to more than 120 countries worldwide. As of 2017, Canada produced 65% of the world's lentils.

Al-Katib works with the University of Saskatchewan's Crop Development Centre. He has chaired the Small and Medium Enterprise Advisory Council (2004-2012) and the National Agri-Food Strategy Roundtable (2017-2020). He was the lead adviser reviewing the Canada Transportation Act in 2016. In 2021, he served on the Industry Strategy Council to develop Canada's post-COVID industrial strategy. He encourages diversity in business startups and the engagement of entrepreneurs in social change and innovation. He was appointed to the Board of Directors of Saskatchewan's Golden Opportunities Fund in 2018.

== Community involvement ==
=== Local ===
Al-Katib has been the team president of the Regina Thunder Football Club. He supports community programs in mental health and amateur sports through the Saskatchewan Roughrider Foundation.

=== International ===
Al-Katib has worked with international organizations such as the International Red Cross, the United Nations World Food Programme, and the Red Crescent Movement to provide nutritious food to people in conflict zones. He provided 700 million meals of Saskatchewan-grown chickpeas, lentils and wheat to a United Nations program for Syrian refugees. In 2017, he won the Oslo Business for Peace Award for this work.

== Awards and honors ==
- 2016, EY Entrepreneur Of The Year for Canada
- 2017, Changing the Pulse of the Province, documentary film, NSBA Saskatoon Business Association
- 2017, EY World Entrepreneur Of The Year
- 2017, Saskatchewan Order of Merit, Province of Saskatchewan
- 2017, Oslo Business for Peace Award
- 2019, Honorary diploma, Saskatchewan Polytechnic
- 2020, one of Canada's top five CEOs and Innovator of the Year, Globe and Mail, "Awarded to a CEO whose vision and guidance has been instrumental in the successful creation and commercialization of a truly disruptive product or service, and/or who has pioneered a groundbreaking way of doing business."
- 2024, Testimonial Dinner Award, Public Policy Forum
- 2024, Lifetime Achievement Award, University of Saskatchewan Alumni Association
