= Big Sky Rail =

Railway in Saskatchewan, Canada

Overview
- Headquarters: Emerald Park, Saskatchewan
- Reporting mark: BGS
- Locale: Delisle to Beechy; Macrorie to Laporte; Wartime to Kyle
- Dates of operation: 2011–

Technical
- Track gauge: 4 ft 8 1/2 in (1,435 mm) standard gauge

Big Sky Rail (reporting mark BGS) is a short line railway operating in the province of Saskatchewan, Canada.

This 400 km shortline railroad was formed in 2011 as a subsidiary of Mobil Grain, a Saskatchewan-based agricultural processor and exporter. The Big Sky Rail network has three separate subdivisions. The first is the Conquest subdivision which interchanges with CN at Delisle and runs south to Beechy. The second is the Elrose subdivision which runs from near Macrorie west to Laporte. The third (and smallest) is the Matador subdivision which runs south from Wartime to Kyle.

Big Sky Rail operates with running rights into CN Chappell Yard in Saskatoon and also to the Last Mountain Railway at Davidson. All locomotives used on BGS are owned by Mobil Grain (MGLX) and are utilized on their sister company, Last Mountain Railway.

Big Sky Rail was purchased by AGT Food and Ingredients Inc., for $57.5 million Canadian in the fall of 2015. AGT Food and Ingredients Inc. purchased the railroad, and other short lines in Saskatchewan, in order to increase its logistics capacities.
