= John Leslie Charles =

Major John Leslie Charles (1892-1992) was Chief Engineer for the Canadian National Railway (Western Region) and consulting engineer for the Canadian National Railway. He worked and published on the subject of railway development in remote or difficult areas. He received numerous awards for his work, including being named an Officer of the Order of Canada.

== Biography ==
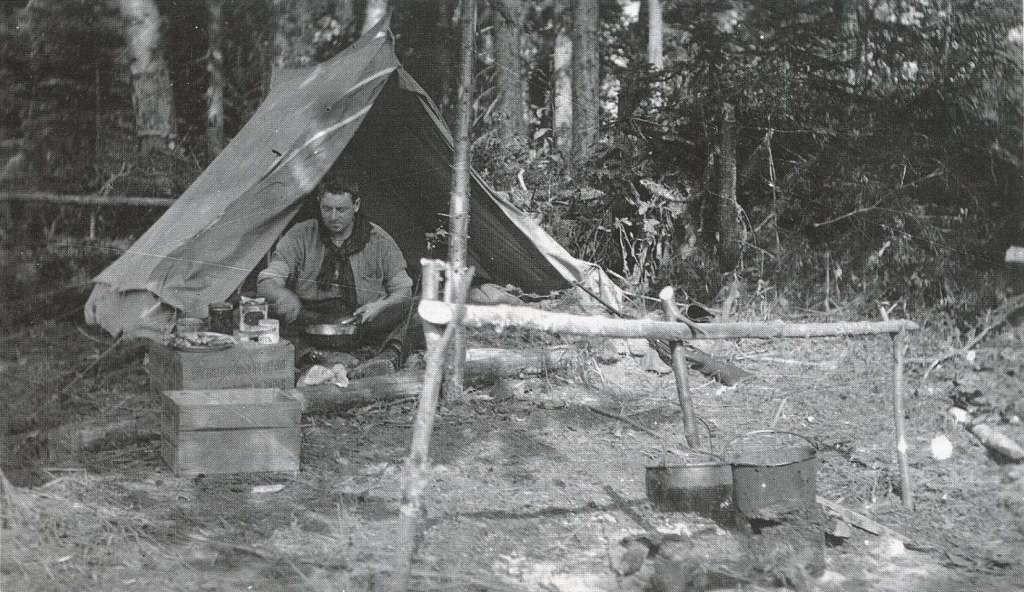
J.L. Charles 1914

Born at Weybridge, Surrey, England on 15 December 1892, son of Robert W. Charles and Alice Priscilla Poulton, he attended the Edward the Sixth Royal Grammar School and emigrated to Canada in 1910. His first railway job was as a rodman on the location survey for the Grand Trunk Pacific Railway in the Rocky Mountains. Beginning in 1913, he worked as a transit man with the survey crew that located the northern section of the Hudson Bay Railway. Work on this railway was suspended with the outbreak of World War I, and Charles was appointed reconnaissance engineer when the project was resumed in 1926. A large part of this survey was carried out during the winter of 1927 by Charles on foot and dog sled with two men from the Cree (Nēhilaw) community at Split Lake.

He rose to Chief Engineer of the Western Region for the Canadian National Railways, and was responsible for much of the engineering and construction in western Canada, northern Manitoba, and the Northwest Territories. After his official retirement at the age of 65, he continued with the railway for another eight years as Consulting Engineer. He was involved in railway development in Liberia, Zambia and Brazil, as well as throughout Canada. Charles was a veteran of two wars. During the First World War he served overseas with the Royal Winnipeg Rifles, transferring to the Canadian Engineers and the Canadian Railway Troops, rising to the rank of Major. He was twice mentioned in dispatches and was presented with the Distinguished Service Order by King George V. During the Second World War, he recruited the 20th Field Company of the Royal Canadian Engineers at Winnipeg and commanded that unit on the Pacific Coast. After the war he helped the US Army locate a military rail line between the railways in British Columbia and US Forces in the Alaska Territory.

His published articles in professional journals emphasize railway development in remote and difficult terrain, including studies of the Great Slave Lake Railway, the first railway built into the Northwest Territories, and his experience with engineering techniques to allow railway construction through the permafrost of the northern tundra. He published his autobiography, Westward Go Young Man, in 1978. It contained memoirs, anecdotes, and photographs reflecting the first eighty of the hundred years through which he lived. His body of photographic work documents daily life and railroading from the early 1900s in northern Canada to the remote Brazilian Amazon rainforest in the 1970s. Many of his photographs are included in the Western Canada Pictorial Index (Major J. L. Charles Collection) held at the University of Winnipeg Archives.

Charles was a member of the Association of Professional Engineers of Manitoba from 1921 to his death, serving as its President in 1953. He received the Julian C. Smith Award from the Engineering Institute of Canada in 1968, and in 1981 he was awarded the Gold Medal Award by the Association of Professional Engineers of Manitoba. In 2009 he was posthumously entered into the Canadian Railway Hall of Fame in the category of Leader. He received honorary doctorates from the University of Manitoba (1973) and the Technical University of Nova Scotia (1987). In 1973 he was inducted as an Officer (O.C.) into the Order of Canada to recognize "a lifetime of achievement and merit of a high degree, especially in service to Canada or to humanity at large."

His daughter Eira Friesen was a prominent women's activist in Winnipeg and was inducted as a Member of the Order of Canada in 2003.
