= CGS Graham Bell =

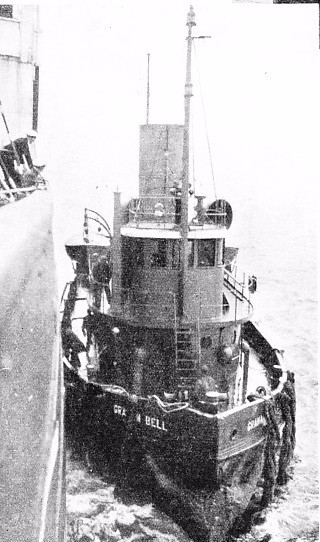
- Graham Bell next to the freighter Pennyworth, the first freighter to visit Churchill's new port facilities, in 1933

Canada
- Name: Graham Bell
- Namesake: Alexander Graham Bell
- Yard number: 504
- Launched: 11 June 1929

General characteristics
- Type: Tugboat
- Tonnage: 250 GRT

CGS Graham Bell (Note: CGS stands for Canadian Government Ship) was a Canadian government tugboat that was wrecked, and beached, while operating out of Churchill, Manitoba. Entering service in 1929, Graham Bell was brought to Churchill specifically to aid in the construction of port facilities. Operating out of Churchill, Graham Bell left only during the Second World War after being loaned by the government to assist in towing duties along the East Coast of Canada. Following the war, the tugboat returned to Churchill.

== Description ==
Graham Bell was tugboat with a tonnage of 250 gross register tons (GRT).

== Service history ==
Constructed by Davie Shipbuilding with the yard number 504, the tugboat was launched at Levis, Quebec on 11 June 1929. Graham Bell was then towed to Churchill, Manitoba by another tug, Ocean Eagle, in 1929, to assist in the construction of new port facilities.

Graham Bell was the tug that first brought a local pilot to Pennyworth, the first freighter to visit Churchill's newly completed port facilities, in 1933. During the Second World War Graham Bell left Churchill, when the vessel was pressed into service on the East Coast of Canada for towing duties. The tugboat returned to Churchill following the war. where she was grounded.

== Sources ==
- "Graham Bell (5134595)". Miramar Ship Index.
