= Hudson Bay =

Large body of saltwater in northeastern Canada

- ᑕᓯᐅᔭᕐᔪᐊᖅ (Inuktitut); ᑲᖏᖅᓱᐊᓗᒃ ᐃᓗᐊ (Inuktitut); baie d'Hudson (French); ᐐᓂᐯᒄ (Southern East Cree); ᐐᓂᐹᒄ (Northern East Cree)
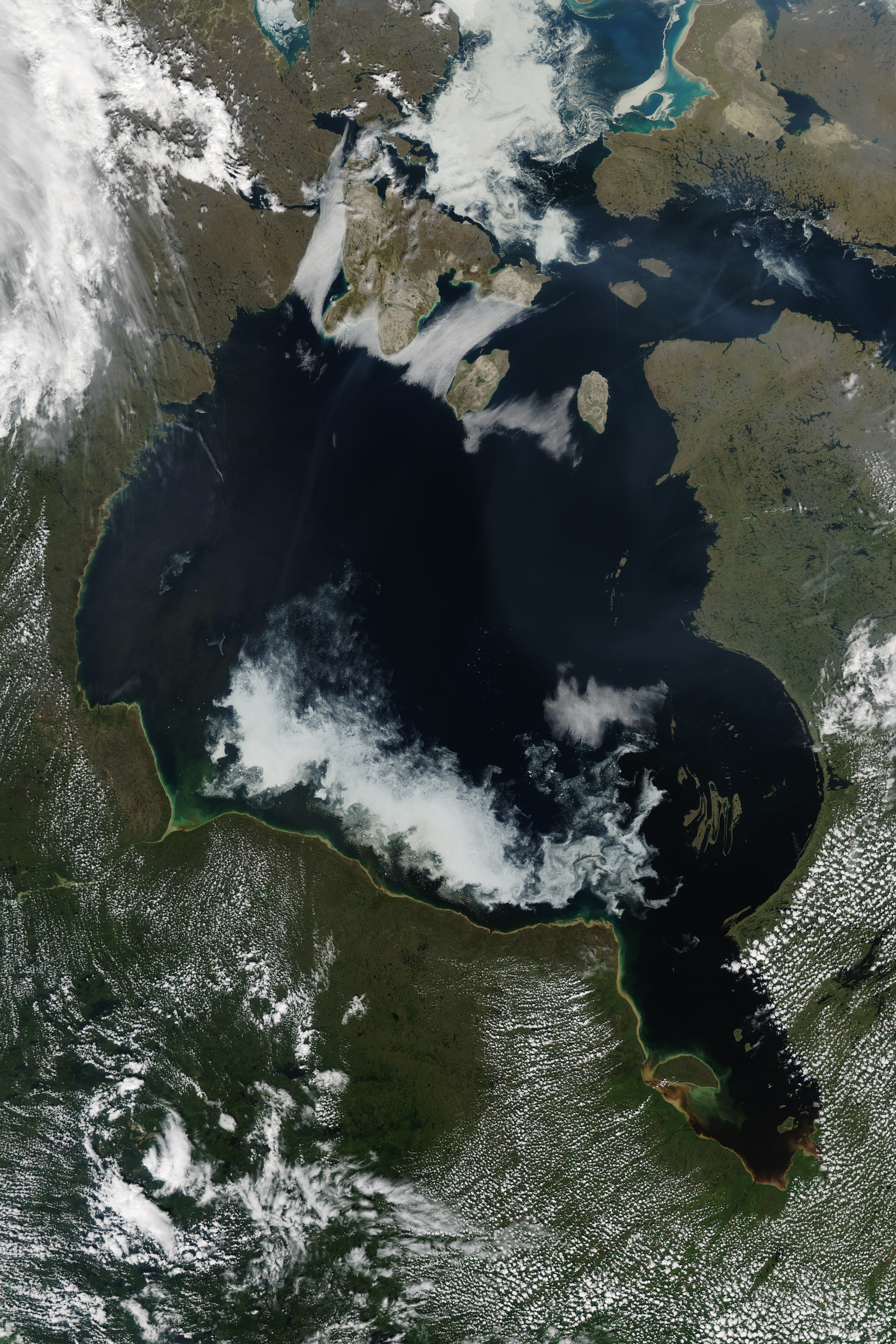
- Hudson Bay, Canada

- Location of Hudson Bay within Canada
- Location: Canada
- Coordinates: 60°N 86°W
- Type: Bay
- Etymology: Henry Hudson
- Ocean/sea sources: Arctic Ocean
- Catchment area: 3,861,400 km^{2} (1,490,900 sq mi)
- Basin countries: Canada and the United States
- Max. length: 1,370 km (850 mi)
- Max. width: 1,050 km (650 mi)
- Surface area: 1,230,000 km^{2} (470,000 sq mi)
- Average depth: 100 m (330 ft)
- Max. depth: 270 m (890 ft)
- Max. temperature: 8 to 27 °C (46 to 81 °F)
- Min. temperature: −51 to −29 °C (−60 to −20 °F)
- Frozen: middle of December to middle of June
- Islands: ≈ 1,500
- Settlements: Rankin Inlet, Arviat, Puvirnituq, Churchill

Hudson Bay, (Note: Inuktitut: ᑕᓯᐅᔭᕐᔪᐊᖅ, romanized: Tasiujarjuaq or ᑲᖏᖅᓱᐊᓗᒃ ᐃᓗᐊ, Kangiqsualuk ilua; French: baie d'Hudson; Southern East Cree: ᐐᓂᐯᒄ, romanized: Wînipekw; Northern East Cree: ᐐᓂᐹᒄ, romanized: Wînipâkw) sometimes called Hudson's Bay (usually historically), is a large body of saltwater in northeastern Canada with a surface area of 1,230,000 km^{2} (470,000 sq mi). It is located north of Ontario, west of Quebec, northeast of Manitoba, and southeast of Nunavut, but politically entirely part of Nunavut. It is an inland marginal sea of the Arctic Ocean. The Hudson Strait provides a connection to the Labrador Sea and the Atlantic Ocean in the northeast, while the Foxe Channel connects Hudson Bay with the Arctic Ocean in the north. The Hudson Bay drainage basin drains a very large area, about 3,861,400 km^{2} (1,490,900 sq mi), that includes parts of southeastern Nunavut, Alberta, Saskatchewan, Ontario, Quebec, all of Manitoba, and parts of the U.S. states of North Dakota, South Dakota, Minnesota, and Montana.

Hudson Bay's southern arm is called James Bay.

== Native names ==
The Eastern Cree name for Hudson and James Bay is Wînipekw (southern dialect) or Wînipâkw (northern dialect), meaning muddy or brackish water. Lake Winnipeg is similarly named by the local Cree, as is the location for the city of Winnipeg.

== Description ==
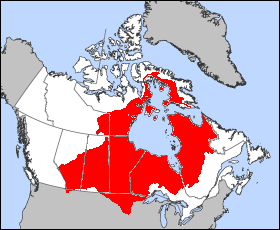
Hudson Bay drainage basin

The bay is named after Henry Hudson, an Englishman sailing for the Dutch East India Company, and after whom the river that he explored in 1609 is also named. Hudson Bay encompasses 1,230,000 km^{2} (470,000 sq mi), making it the second-largest water body using the term "bay" in the world (after the Bay of Bengal). The bay is relatively shallow and is considered an epicontinental sea, with an average depth of about 100 m (330 ft) (compared to 2,600 m (8,500 ft) in the Bay of Bengal). It is about 1,370 km (850 mi) long and 1,050 km (650 mi) wide. On the east it is connected with the Arctic Ocean (Davis Strait) by Hudson Strait; on the north, with the Arctic Ocean by Foxe Basin (which is not considered part of the bay), and Fury and Hecla Strait.

Hudson Bay is often considered part of the Arctic Ocean: the International Hydrographic Organization, in its 2002 working draft of Limits of Oceans and Seas, defined Hudson Bay, with its outlet extending from 62.5 to 66.5 degrees north (just a few miles south of the Arctic Circle) as being part of the Arctic Ocean, specifically "Arctic Ocean Subdivision 9.11". Other authorities include it in the Atlantic, in part because of its greater water budget connection with that ocean.

== History ==
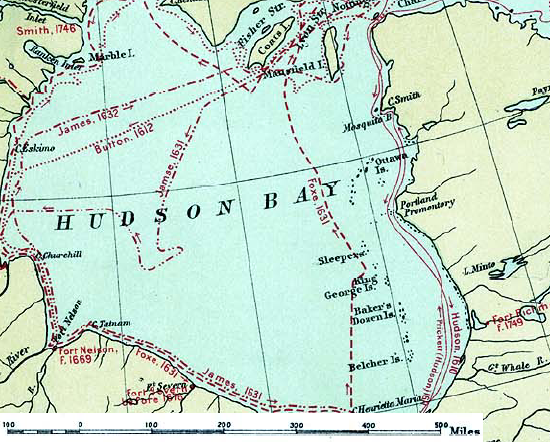
Canada, routes of explorers (1497 to 1905)

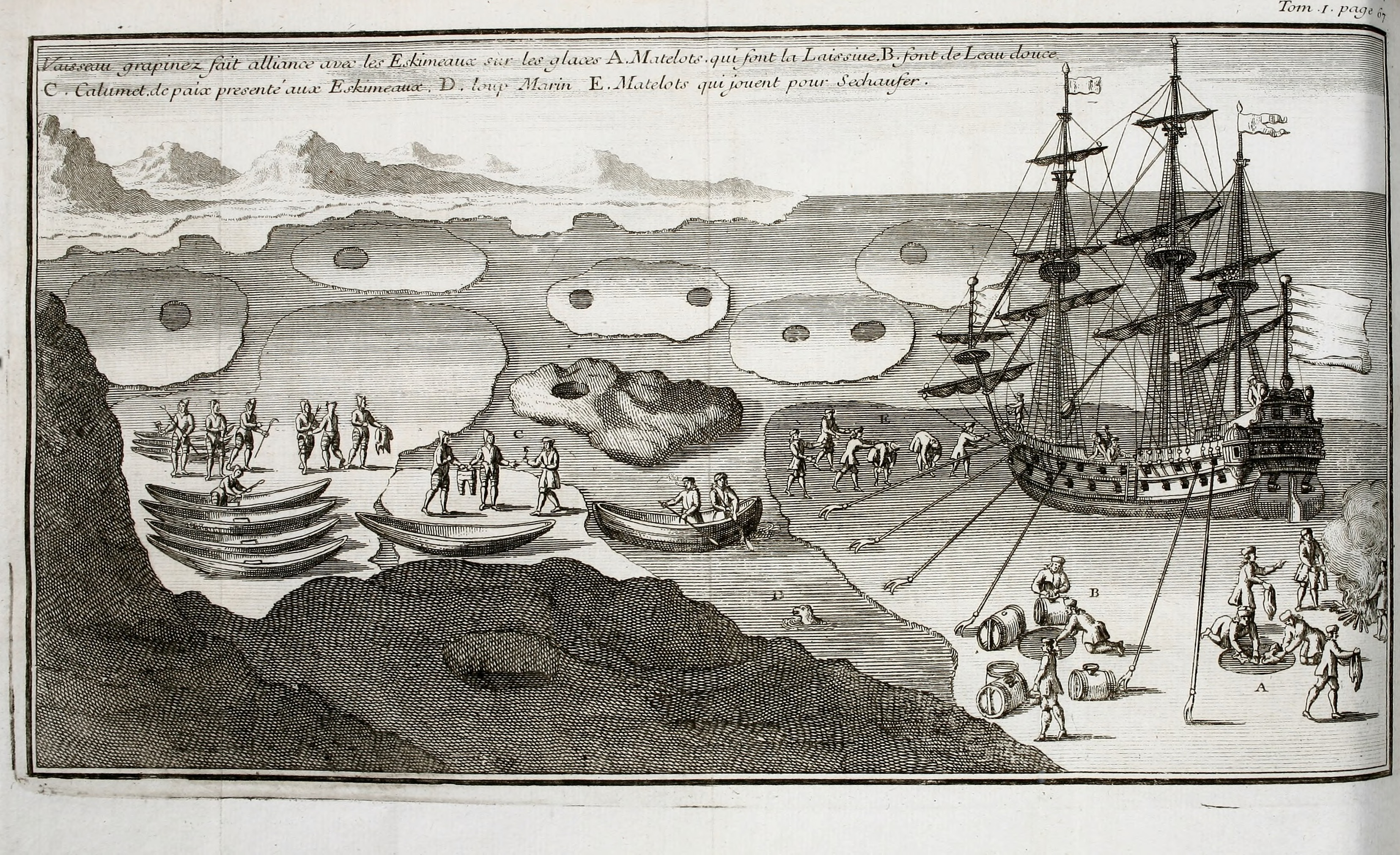
A European ship coming into contact with Inuit in the ice of Hudson Bay (1697)

The search for a western route to Cathay and the East Indies, which had been actively pursued since the days of Christopher Columbus and John Cabot, in the latter part of the 15th century, directly resulted in the first sighting of Hudson Bay by Europeans. English explorers and colonists named Hudson Bay after Sir Henry Hudson who explored the bay beginning 2 August 1610, on his ship Discovery. On his fourth voyage to North America, Hudson worked his way around Greenland's west coast and into the bay, mapping much of its eastern coast. Discovery became trapped in the ice over the winter, and the crew survived onshore at the southern tip of James Bay. In the spring, as the ice receded, Henry Hudson expressed a desire to continue exploring the uncharted region. However, on 22 June 1611, the crew mutinied. They left Hudson and others adrift in a small boat. The fate of Hudson and the other men stranded with him remains undetermined. Nevertheless, there is little evidence in historical documents to suggest that they persisted for a long time thereafter. In May 1612, Sir Thomas Button sailed from England with two ships to look for Henry Hudson, and to continue the search for the Northwest Passage to Asia.

In 1668, Nonsuch reached the bay and traded for beaver pelts, leading to the creation of the Hudson's Bay Company (HBC), which still bears the historic name. The HBC negotiated a trading monopoly from the English Crown for the Hudson Bay watershed, called Rupert's Land. In 1670, the English Crown granted a charter to facilitate fur trading within the Hudson Bay drainage basin. France contested this grant by sending several military expeditions to the region, but abandoned its claim in the Treaty of Utrecht (April 1713).

The Treaty of Utrecht, signed on 11 April 1713, marked a significant agreement between Britain and France. The treaty was negotiated in Utrecht, Netherlands, and marked a crucial stage in the conclusion of the War of the Spanish Succession. Its provisions had a significant impact in shaping the postwar landscape and establishing a new order in both Europe and North America. French concessions in North America as outlined in the Treaty of Utrecht included: Hudson Bay region, Nova Scotia, and Newfoundland.

During this period, the HBC built several factories (forts and trading posts) along the coast at the mouth of the major rivers (such as Fort Severn; York Factory, Churchill; and the Prince of Wales Fort). The strategic locations were bases for inland exploration. More importantly, they were also trading posts with Indigenous peoples who came to them with furs from their trapping season. The HBC shipped the furs to Europe and continued to use some of these posts well into the 20th century.

The HBC's trade monopoly was abolished in 1870, by a British Order in Council called the Deed of Surrender, ceded Rupert's Land to Canada, an area of approximately 3,900,000 km^{2} (1,500,000 sq mi), as part of the Northwest Territories. In 1912, the western shore south of 60° and, following the Quebec Boundaries Extension Act, 1912, all the eastern shore were transferred to the adjacent provinces, but the bay and offshore islands remained part of the Northwest Territories. Starting in 1913, the bay was extensively charted by the Canadian government's CSS Acadia to develop it for navigation. This mapping progress led to the establishment of Churchill, Manitoba, as a deep-sea port for wheat exports in 1929, after unsuccessful attempts at Port Nelson.

The Port of Churchill was an important shipping link for trade with Europe and Russia until its closure in 2016 by owner OmniTRAX. The port and the Hudson Bay Railway were then sold to the Arctic Gateway Group—a consortium of First Nations, local governments, and corporate investors—in 2018.

On 9 July 2019, ships resupplying Arctic communities began stopping at the port for additional cargo, and the port began shipping grain again on 7 September 2019.

== Geography and climate ==
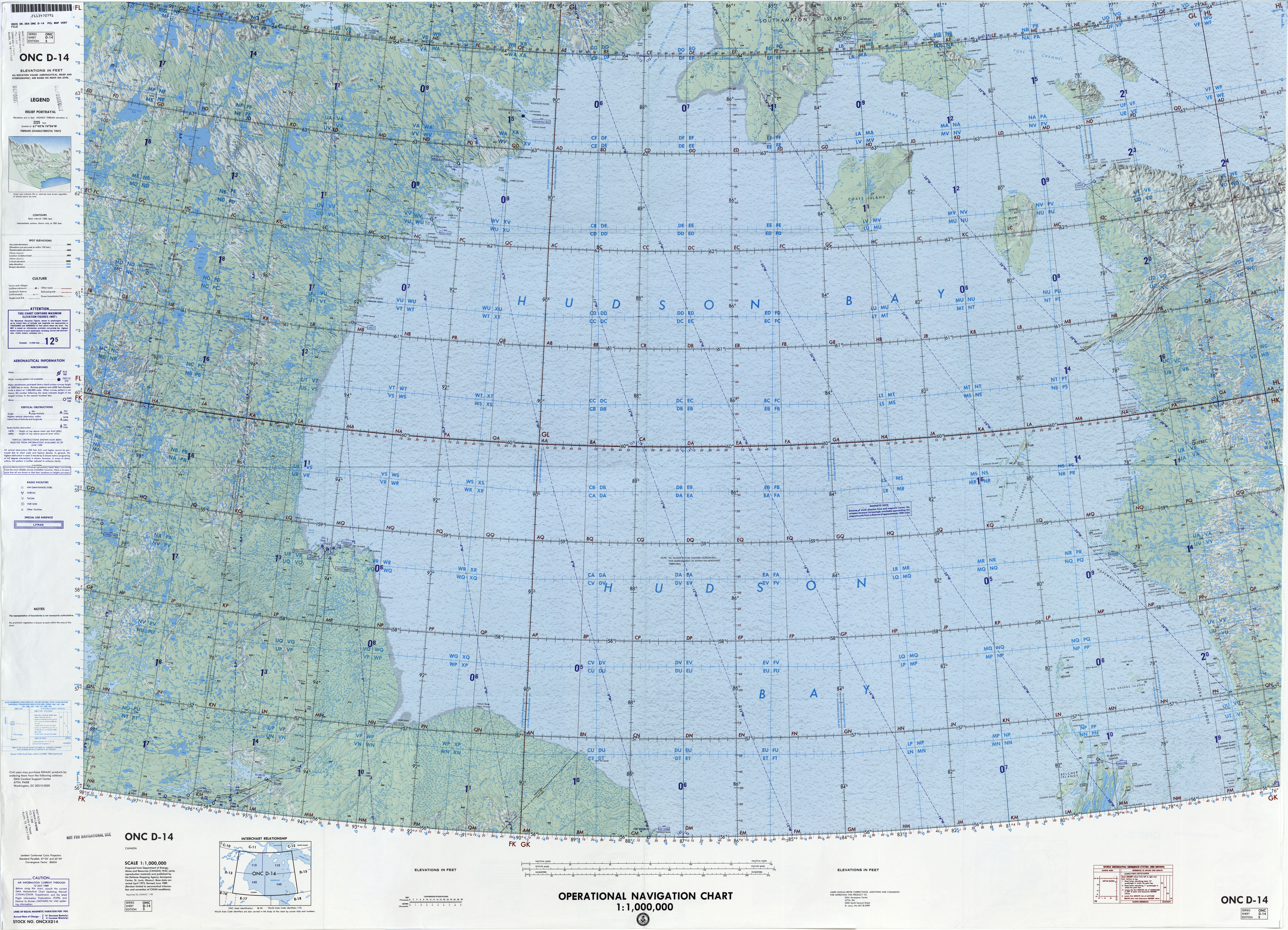
Map including Hudson Bay

=== Extent ===
The International Hydrographic Organization defines the northern limit of Hudson Bay as follows:

A line from Nuvuk Point (62°21′N 78°06′W) to Leyson Point, the Southeastern extreme of Southampton Island, through the Southern and Western shores of Southampton Island to its Northern extremity, thence a line to Beach Point (66°03′N 86°06′W) on the Mainland.

=== Climate ===
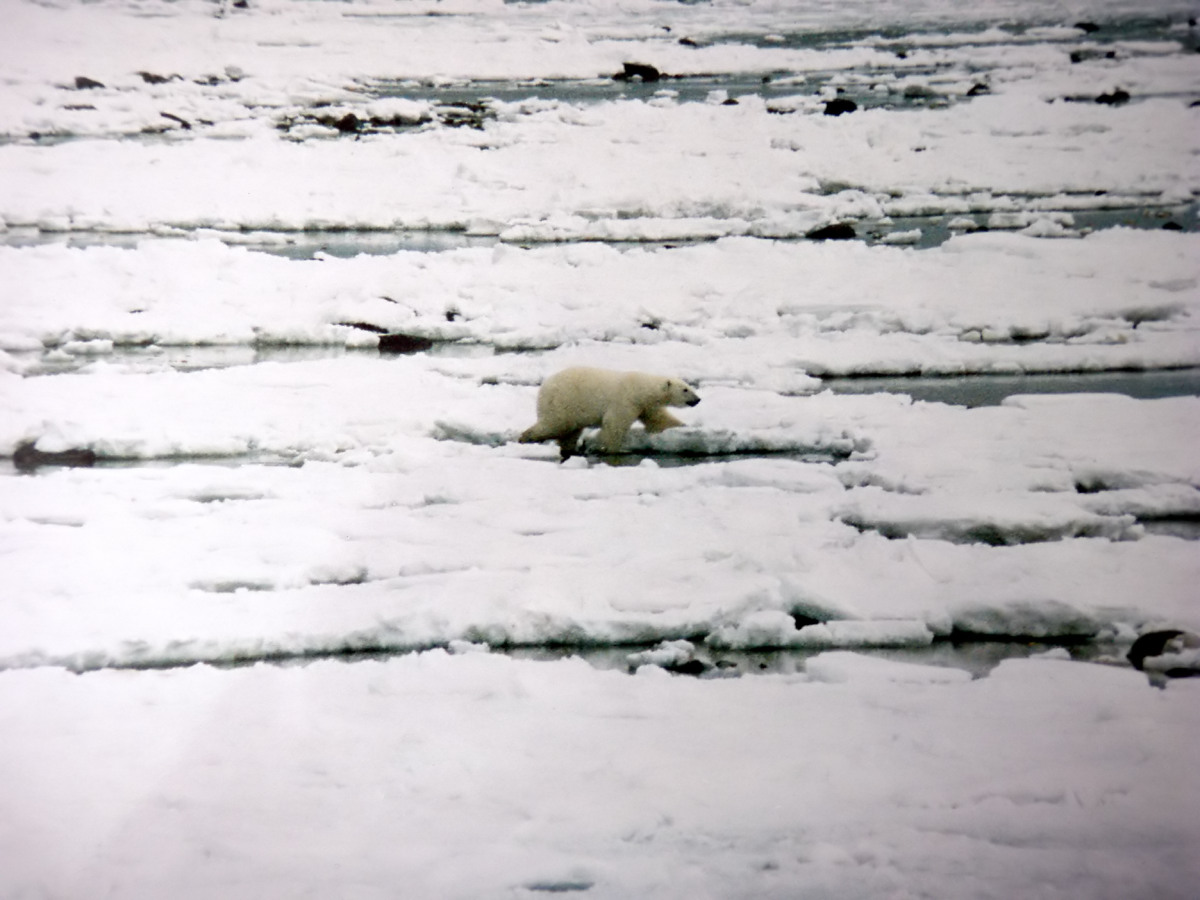
Polar bear walks on newly formed ice in early November at Hudson Bay.

Northern Hudson Bay has a polar climate (Köppen: ET) being one of the few places in the world where this type of climate is found south of 60 °N, going farther south towards Quebec, where Inukjuak is still dominated by the tundra. From Arviat, Nunavut, to the west to the south and southeast prevails the subarctic climate (Köppen: Dfc). This is because in the central summer months, heat waves can advance from the hot land and make the weather milder, with the result that the average temperature surpasses 10 °C (50 °F). The bay receives water from various surrounding rivers and currents originating from the Foxe Basin in the north, resulting in a counterclockwise overall flow. At the extreme southern tip of the extension known as James Bay arises a humid continental climate with a longer and generally hotter summer. (Köppen: Dfb). The average annual temperature in almost the entire bay is around 0 °C (32 °F) or below. In the extreme northeast, winter temperatures average as low as −29 °C (−20 °F).

The Hudson Bay region has very low year-round average temperatures. The average annual temperature for Churchill at 59°N is −6 °C (21 °F) and Inukjuak, facing cool westerlies in summer at 58°N, an even colder −7 °C (19 °F). By comparison, Magadan, in a comparable position at 59°N on the Eurasian landmass in the Russian Far East and with a similar subarctic climate, has an annual average of −2.7 °C (27.1 °F). Vis-à-vis geographically closer Europe, contrasts stand much more extreme. Arkhangelsk at 64°N in northwestern Russia has an average of 2 °C (36 °F), while the mild continental coastline of Stockholm at 59°N on the shore of an analogous large hyposaline marine inlet – the Baltic Sea – has an annual average of 8 °C (46 °F).

Water temperature peaks at 8–9 °C (46–48 °F) on the western side of the bay in late summer. It is largely frozen over from mid-December to mid-June, when it usually clears from its eastern end westwards and southwards. A steady increase in regional temperatures over the last 100 years has led to decreases in the extent of the sea ice in Hudson Bay by 19.5% per decade. As well as a lengthening of the ice-free period, which was as short as four months in the late 17th century.

The polar climate of Hudson Bay means it is home for a variety of polar climate animals, in the Western Hudson Bay (WHB) beluga whale population is the most significant known group in the Canadian Arctic, estimated to consist of approximately 54,473 individuals.

Climate data for Arviat (Arviat Airport) WMO ID: 71174; coordinates 61°05′38″N 94°04′18″W; elevation: 10.4 m (34 ft); 1991–2020 normals, (Note: Climate data 1991–2020 is a composite recorded at Arviat A; Climate ID: 2300MKF; coordinates 61°06′N 94°04′W; elevation: 10.4 m (34 ft), Arviat Climate; WMO ID: 71322; coordinates 61°06′N 94°04′W; elevation: 9.8 m (32 ft), and Arviat AWOS; Climate ID: 2300426; coordinates 61°06′N 94°04′W; elevation: 10.4 m (34 ft)) extremes 1973–present
Month	Jan	Feb	Mar	Apr	May	Jun	Jul	Aug	Sep	Oct	Nov	Dec	Year
Record high humidex	−1.8	−3.3	2.6	4.0	15.0	30.5	34.3	32.6	26.2	19.1	1.9	−0.4	34.3
Record high °C (°F)	−1.5 (29.3)	−1.5 (29.3)	3.5 (38.3)	4.0 (39.2)	21.3 (70.3)	30.8 (87.4)	33.9 (93.0)	30.0 (86.0)	23.0 (73.4)	18.1 (64.6)	2.1 (35.8)	−0.1 (31.8)	33.9 (93.0)
Mean daily maximum °C (°F)	−24.4 (−11.9)	−24.2 (−11.6)	−18.1 (−0.6)	−9.4 (15.1)	−1.1 (30.0)	8.3 (46.9)	15.2 (59.4)	14.1 (57.4)	8.0 (46.4)	−0.4 (31.3)	−11.0 (12.2)	−19.4 (−2.9)	−5.2 (22.6)
Daily mean °C (°F)	−28.2 (−18.8)	−28.1 (−18.6)	−22.8 (−9.0)	−14.2 (6.4)	−4.3 (24.3)	4.8 (40.6)	11.2 (52.2)	10.7 (51.3)	5.2 (41.4)	−2.9 (26.8)	−15.0 (5.0)	−23.2 (−9.8)	−8.9 (16.0)
Mean daily minimum °C (°F)	−31.9 (−25.4)	−32.0 (−25.6)	−27.4 (−17.3)	−18.7 (−1.7)	−7.3 (18.9)	1.3 (34.3)	7.1 (44.8)	7.3 (45.1)	2.4 (36.3)	−5.5 (22.1)	−19.0 (−2.2)	−27.0 (−16.6)	−12.6 (9.3)
Record low °C (°F)	−48.3 (−54.9)	−47.0 (−52.6)	−41.5 (−42.7)	−36.7 (−34.1)	−26.7 (−16.1)	−11.0 (12.2)	−4.0 (24.8)	−0.6 (30.9)	−8.3 (17.1)	−26.0 (−14.8)	−34.6 (−30.3)	−42.5 (−44.5)	−48.3 (−54.9)
Record low wind chill	−62.7	−64.7	−62.4	−49.5	−35.7	−19.1	0.0	0.0	−14.0	−37.2	−51.6	−59.3	−64.7
Average precipitation mm (inches)	12.4 (0.49)	10.9 (0.43)	16.3 (0.64)	19.4 (0.76)	19.2 (0.76)	30.0 (1.18)	42.0 (1.65)	60.1 (2.37)	47.3 (1.86)	27.4 (1.08)	19.6 (0.77)	13.4 (0.53)	318.0 (12.52)
Average rainfall mm (inches)	0.0 (0.0)	0.0 (0.0)	0.1 (0.00)	0.5 (0.02)	6.7 (0.26)	25.7 (1.01)	38.3 (1.51)	61.3 (2.41)	43.5 (1.71)	9.2 (0.36)	0.0 (0.0)	0.0 (0.0)	185.2 (7.29)
Average snowfall cm (inches)	7.4 (2.9)	4.9 (1.9)	9.2 (3.6)	10.1 (4.0)	11.7 (4.6)	1.1 (0.4)	0.0 (0.0)	0.0 (0.0)	3.4 (1.3)	12.5 (4.9)	12.1 (4.8)	9.0 (3.5)	81.4 (32.0)
Average precipitation days (≥ 0.2 mm)	10.7	10.1	11.2	11.3	9.8	10.3	11.0	16.6	14.8	13.0	11.6	11.1	141.5
Average rainy days (≥ 0.2 mm)	0.0	0.0	0.1	0.33	2.4	8.1	10.1	15.4	12.2	3.5	0.0	0.0	52.1
Average snowy days (≥ 0.2 cm)	6.0	5.5	7.7	6.6	5.2	0.6	0.0	0.0	1.2	8.1	9.9	6.9	57.7
Average relative humidity (%) (at 1500 LST)	74.2	73.7	77.5	82.2	84.5	77.1	72.3	75.6	76.2	84.9	83.4	78.1	78.3
Source: Environment and Climate Change Canada (May maximum)

Climate data for Churchill (Churchill Airport) Climate ID: 5060600; coordinates 58°44′21″N 94°03′59″W; elevation: 29.3 m (96 ft); 1991−2020 normals, extremes 1929−present
Month	Jan	Feb	Mar	Apr	May	Jun	Jul	Aug	Sep	Oct	Nov	Dec	Year
Record high humidex	1.2	1.7	8.3	28.0	30.7	36.5	39.7	44.2	34.1	23.0	5.5	2.8	44.2
Record high °C (°F)	1.7 (35.1)	1.8 (35.2)	9.0 (48.2)	28.2 (82.8)	28.9 (84.0)	32.2 (90.0)	36.9 (98.4)	34.5 (94.1)	29.2 (84.6)	21.7 (71.1)	7.2 (45.0)	3.0 (37.4)	36.9 (98.4)
Mean daily maximum °C (°F)	−21.2 (−6.2)	−20.0 (−4.0)	−13.7 (7.3)	−5.0 (23.0)	2.9 (37.2)	12.8 (55.0)	18.2 (64.8)	16.7 (62.1)	10.4 (50.7)	1.8 (35.2)	−8.3 (17.1)	−17.0 (1.4)	−1.9 (28.6)
Daily mean °C (°F)	−25.3 (−13.5)	−24.3 (−11.7)	−18.6 (−1.5)	−9.7 (14.5)	−0.9 (30.4)	7.6 (45.7)	13.0 (55.4)	12.5 (54.5)	7.1 (44.8)	−0.7 (30.7)	−12.0 (10.4)	−20.9 (−5.6)	−6.0 (21.2)
Mean daily minimum °C (°F)	−29.2 (−20.6)	−28.5 (−19.3)	−23.5 (−10.3)	−14.4 (6.1)	−4.7 (23.5)	2.5 (36.5)	7.8 (46.0)	8.2 (46.8)	3.7 (38.7)	−3.2 (26.2)	−15.8 (3.6)	−24.8 (−12.6)	−10.2 (13.6)
Record low °C (°F)	−45.6 (−50.1)	−45.4 (−49.7)	−43.9 (−47.0)	−34.0 (−29.2)	−25.2 (−13.4)	−9.4 (15.1)	−2.2 (28.0)	−2.2 (28.0)	−11.7 (10.9)	−24.5 (−12.1)	−36.1 (−33.0)	−43.9 (−47.0)	−45.6 (−50.1)
Record low wind chill	−64.4	−62.6	−61.4	−56.6	−37.1	−12.7	−6.9	−6.2	−16.7	−35.5	−51.1	−58.5	−64.4
Average precipitation mm (inches)	14.7 (0.58)	13.8 (0.54)	14.1 (0.56)	15.8 (0.62)	25.2 (0.99)	42.0 (1.65)	74.0 (2.91)	80.5 (3.17)	74.9 (2.95)	49.9 (1.96)	28.9 (1.14)	14.9 (0.59)	447.7 (17.63)
Average rainfall mm (inches)	0.0 (0.0)	0.0 (0.0)	0.4 (0.02)	1.1 (0.04)	16.1 (0.63)	41.0 (1.61)	59.8 (2.35)	69.3 (2.73)	66.0 (2.60)	20.9 (0.82)	1.3 (0.05)	0.1 (0.00)	276.0 (10.87)
Average snowfall cm (inches)	21.7 (8.5)	19.3 (7.6)	20.4 (8.0)	24.9 (9.8)	15.5 (6.1)	3.3 (1.3)	0.0 (0.0)	0.0 (0.0)	4.2 (1.7)	29.8 (11.7)	39.2 (15.4)	22.9 (9.0)	201.2 (79.2)
Average precipitation days (≥ 0.2 mm)	12.2	10.9	10.2	8.8	9.9	11.7	14.5	16.7	16.5	16.7	15.7	13.1	156.8
Average rainy days (≥ 0.2 mm)	0.09	0.05	0.45	1.4	5.1	10.7	13.9	14.9	14.5	6.5	0.91	0.24	67.5
Average snowy days (≥ 0.2 cm)	11.9	10.3	11.1	8.3	6.7	1.5	0.0	0.06	2.6	11.6	15.6	12.3	92.1
Average relative humidity (%) (at 1500 LST)	70.5	68.5	69.9	73.2	75.8	66.4	65.3	69.0	72.1	80.1	82.3	75.5	72.4
Average dew point °C (°F)	−30.2 (−22.4)	−28.5 (−19.3)	−22.0 (−7.6)	−11.3 (11.7)	−3.5 (25.7)	2.7 (36.9)	7.4 (45.3)	7.5 (45.5)	2.4 (36.3)	−3.3 (26.1)	−13.8 (7.2)	−25.1 (−13.2)	−9.8 (14.3)
Mean monthly sunshine hours	79.7	117.7	177.8	198.2	197.0	243.0	281.7	225.9	112.0	58.1	55.3	53.1	1,799.5
Percentage possible sunshine	36.2	45.1	48.7	45.8	37.7	44.3	51.6	47.2	29.0	18.2	23.5	26.7	37.8
Source: Environment and Climate Change Canada (rain/rain days, snow/snow days 1981–2010) (dew point 1300 LST 1951–1980) Canadian Climate Normals 1951–1980

Climate data for Coral Harbour (Coral Harbour Airport) WMO ID: 71915; coordinates 64°11′36″N 83°21′34″W; elevation: 62.2 m (204 ft); 1991–2020 normals, extremes 1933−present
Month	Jan	Feb	Mar	Apr	May	Jun	Jul	Aug	Sep	Oct	Nov	Dec	Year
Record high humidex	0.2	−1.9	−0.5	4.4	8.9	23.1	32.8	30.1	19.9	7.6	3.7	3.2	32.8
Record high °C (°F)	0.6 (33.1)	−1.1 (30.0)	0.0 (32.0)	5.0 (41.0)	9.4 (48.9)	23.5 (74.3)	28.0 (82.4)	26.1 (79.0)	18.5 (65.3)	7.6 (45.7)	4.0 (39.2)	3.4 (38.1)	28.0 (82.4)
Mean daily maximum °C (°F)	−24.9 (−12.8)	−25.6 (−14.1)	−20.2 (−4.4)	−11.0 (12.2)	−2.5 (27.5)	6.9 (44.4)	14.8 (58.6)	12.1 (53.8)	4.8 (40.6)	−2.5 (27.5)	−11.2 (11.8)	−19.2 (−2.6)	−6.5 (20.3)
Daily mean °C (°F)	−29.0 (−20.2)	−29.7 (−21.5)	−24.9 (−12.8)	−16.1 (3.0)	−6.0 (21.2)	3.5 (38.3)	10.2 (50.4)	8.2 (46.8)	2.0 (35.6)	−5.5 (22.1)	−15.5 (4.1)	−23.4 (−10.1)	−10.5 (13.1)
Mean daily minimum °C (°F)	−33.2 (−27.8)	−33.7 (−28.7)	−29.7 (−21.5)	−21.1 (−6.0)	−9.6 (14.7)	0.1 (32.2)	5.6 (42.1)	4.2 (39.6)	−0.8 (30.6)	−8.6 (16.5)	−19.8 (−3.6)	−27.6 (−17.7)	−14.5 (5.9)
Record low °C (°F)	−52.8 (−63.0)	−51.4 (−60.5)	−49.4 (−56.9)	−39.4 (−38.9)	−31.1 (−24.0)	−15.6 (3.9)	−1.1 (30.0)	−3.3 (26.1)	−17.2 (1.0)	−34.4 (−29.9)	−40.6 (−41.1)	−48.9 (−56.0)	−52.8 (−63.0)
Record low wind chill	−69.5	−69.3	−64.3	−55.1	−39.7	−23.2	−8.2	−11.8	−23.7	−43.7	−54.8	−64.2	−69.5
Average precipitation mm (inches)	10.9 (0.43)	—	9.6 (0.38)	18.2 (0.72)	19.9 (0.78)	28.0 (1.10)	34.8 (1.37)	61.7 (2.43)	44.9 (1.77)	36.6 (1.44)	23.3 (0.92)	—	—
Average rainfall mm (inches)	0.0 (0.0)	—	0.0 (0.0)	0.5 (0.02)	5.4 (0.21)	22.6 (0.89)	34.8 (1.37)	61.4 (2.42)	35.6 (1.40)	8.4 (0.33)	0.3 (0.01)	—	—
Average snowfall cm (inches)	—	11.2 (4.4)	—	9.6 (3.8)	18.1 (7.1)	14.8 (5.8)	5.4 (2.1)	0.0 (0.0)	0.0 (0.0)	7.8 (3.1)	28.1 (11.1)	22.9 (9.0)	—
Average precipitation days (≥ 0.2 mm)	9.4	—	8.7	9.7	10.6	10.2	9.8	13.0	12.0	15.4	14.0	—	—
Average rainy days (≥ 0.2 mm)	0.0	—	0.06	0.13	2.2	7.9	9.8	13.0	8.6	4.0	0.55	—	—
Average snowy days (≥ 0.2 cm)	9.2	—	8.7	9.7	9.4	3.4	0.0	0.0	4.1	14.0	13.4	—	—
Average relative humidity (%) (at 1500 LST)	67.4	66.4	69.2	74.5	80.3	73.1	62.8	69.1	75.8	85.5	79.7	72.0	73.0
Mean monthly sunshine hours	37.9	112.1	187.4	240.2	239.9	262.2	312.3	220.4	109.8	70.8	47.9	18.8	1,859.7
Percentage possible sunshine	22.4	47.0	51.6	53.2	42.0	41.9	51.2	43.3	27.9	23.3	24.3	13.9	36.8
Source: Environment and Climate Change Canada (sun 1981–2010)

Climate data for Inukjuak (Inukjuak Upper Air) WMO ID: 71907; coordinates 58°28′N 78°05′W; elevation: 24.4 m (80 ft); 1991–2020 normals, extremes 1921–present
Month	Jan	Feb	Mar	Apr	May	Jun	Jul	Aug	Sep	Oct	Nov	Dec	Year
Record high humidex	1.6	2.4	4.4	8.4	26.5	32.4	34.0	28.9	30.0	17.5	7.2	2.6	34.0
Record high °C (°F)	1.9 (35.4)	5.0 (41.0)	4.8 (40.6)	9.6 (49.3)	26.8 (80.2)	30.0 (86.0)	30.0 (86.0)	27.6 (81.7)	27.1 (80.8)	16.7 (62.1)	8.3 (46.9)	16.1 (61.0)	30.0 (86.0)
Mean daily maximum °C (°F)	−19.9 (−3.8)	−21.1 (−6.0)	−15.4 (4.3)	−6.6 (20.1)	1.8 (35.2)	10.3 (50.5)	15.9 (60.6)	14.3 (57.7)	8.8 (47.8)	3.0 (37.4)	−3.2 (26.2)	−11.6 (11.1)	−2.0 (28.4)
Daily mean °C (°F)	−23.5 (−10.3)	−25.4 (−13.7)	−19.8 (−3.6)	−10.9 (12.4)	−1.5 (29.3)	5.8 (42.4)	11.4 (52.5)	10.7 (51.3)	6.1 (43.0)	0.7 (33.3)	−6.4 (20.5)	−15.3 (4.5)	−5.7 (21.7)
Mean daily minimum °C (°F)	−27.2 (−17.0)	−29.5 (−21.1)	−24.6 (−12.3)	−15.3 (4.5)	−4.8 (23.4)	1.3 (34.3)	6.9 (44.4)	7.1 (44.8)	3.4 (38.1)	−1.7 (28.9)	−9.6 (14.7)	−18.9 (−2.0)	−9.4 (15.1)
Record low °C (°F)	−46.1 (−51.0)	−49.4 (−56.9)	−45.0 (−49.0)	−35.2 (−31.4)	−25.6 (−14.1)	−9.4 (15.1)	−6.7 (19.9)	−2.8 (27.0)	−11.1 (12.0)	−22.8 (−9.0)	−33.9 (−29.0)	−43.3 (−45.9)	−49.4 (−56.9)
Record low wind chill	−60.3	−57.7	−54.8	−45.6	−36.3	−15.5	−6.6	0.0	−11.7	−30.7	−46.9	−55.4	−60.3
Average precipitation mm (inches)	14.4 (0.57)	11.6 (0.46)	15.5 (0.61)	22.6 (0.89)	27.0 (1.06)	38.2 (1.50)	60.1 (2.37)	61.1 (2.41)	70.1 (2.76)	58.6 (2.31)	50.6 (1.99)	30.3 (1.19)	459.9 (18.11)
Average rainfall mm (inches)	0.0 (0.0)	0.1 (0.00)	0.1 (0.00)	3.6 (0.14)	12.6 (0.50)	33.6 (1.32)	59.5 (2.34)	61.1 (2.41)	62.2 (2.45)	28.2 (1.11)	3.2 (0.13)	0.4 (0.02)	264.6 (10.42)
Average snowfall cm (inches)	15.0 (5.9)	12.0 (4.7)	16.1 (6.3)	19.4 (7.6)	14.6 (5.7)	4.4 (1.7)	1.0 (0.4)	0.0 (0.0)	7.5 (3.0)	32.6 (12.8)	50.0 (19.7)	32.0 (12.6)	204.5 (80.5)
Average precipitation days (≥ 0.2 mm)	10.7	9.1	9.1	10.0	11.3	10.7	12.8	15.1	18.9	20.4	20.6	15.1	163.8
Average rainy days (≥ 0.2 mm)	0.09	0.04	0.09	1.2	4.5	8.5	12.8	15.1	16.2	8.6	1.2	0.13	68.5
Average snowy days (≥ 0.2 cm)	10.8	9.2	9.3	9.9	8.4	3.6	0.26	0.13	5.0	15.6	20.3	15.3	107.8
Average relative humidity (%) (at 1500 LST)	75.4	75.0	77.8	80.9	78.4	67.0	65.0	72.9	78.3	81.9	85.6	82.7	76.7
Mean monthly sunshine hours	63.5	122.5	182.5	183.2	159.4	209.4	226.0	171.7	97.9	50.4	31.8	35.2	1,533.5
Percentage possible sunshine	28.6	46.7	49.9	42.5	30.6	38.4	41.6	36.0	25.4	15.8	13.4	17.5	32.2
Source: Environment and Climate Change Canada (rain/rain days, snow/snow days, precipitation/precipitation days and sun 1971–2000)

Climate data for Kuujjuarapik (Kuujjuarapik Airport) Climate ID: 7103536; coordinates 55°17′N 77°45′W; elevation: 12.2 m (40 ft); 1991–2020 normals, extremes 1925–present
Month	Jan	Feb	Mar	Apr	May	Jun	Jul	Aug	Sep	Oct	Nov	Dec	Year
Record high humidex	3.3	5.2	10.7	21.5	33.5	38.7	41.9	38.9	36.5	27.0	12.5	6.9	41.9
Record high °C (°F)	3.5 (38.3)	9.4 (48.9)	12.1 (53.8)	21.9 (71.4)	35.3 (95.5)	33.9 (93.0)	37.0 (98.6)	33.3 (91.9)	33.9 (93.0)	23.9 (75.0)	11.8 (53.2)	7.2 (45.0)	37.0 (98.6)
Mean daily maximum °C (°F)	−17.2 (1.0)	−17.2 (1.0)	−10.5 (13.1)	−2.5 (27.5)	6.2 (43.2)	12.6 (54.7)	16.6 (61.9)	16.2 (61.2)	11.8 (53.2)	5.8 (42.4)	−1.1 (30.0)	−9.8 (14.4)	0.9 (33.6)
Daily mean °C (°F)	−21.3 (−6.3)	−22.3 (−8.1)	−16.0 (3.2)	−7.3 (18.9)	1.8 (35.2)	7.6 (45.7)	11.9 (53.4)	12.4 (54.3)	8.5 (47.3)	3.2 (37.8)	−3.7 (25.3)	−13.2 (8.2)	−3.2 (26.2)
Mean daily minimum °C (°F)	−25.3 (−13.5)	−27.5 (−17.5)	−21.5 (−6.7)	−12.2 (10.0)	−2.7 (27.1)	2.5 (36.5)	7.2 (45.0)	8.6 (47.5)	5.1 (41.2)	0.5 (32.9)	−6.2 (20.8)	−16.5 (2.3)	−7.3 (18.9)
Record low °C (°F)	−49.4 (−56.9)	−48.9 (−56.0)	−45.0 (−49.0)	−33.9 (−29.0)	−25.0 (−13.0)	−7.8 (18.0)	−2.2 (28.0)	−1.1 (30.0)	−6.1 (21.0)	−15.0 (5.0)	−28.9 (−20.0)	−46.1 (−51.0)	−49.4 (−56.9)
Record low wind chill	−62.6	−62.3	−58.8	−44.5	−30.2	−12.2	−7.5	−5.4	−9.7	−21.3	−38.0	−56.4	−62.6
Average precipitation mm (inches)	29.4 (1.16)	18.7 (0.74)	23.5 (0.93)	20.4 (0.80)	39.8 (1.57)	56.6 (2.23)	82.4 (3.24)	84.5 (3.33)	107.6 (4.24)	83.7 (3.30)	65.1 (2.56)	52.4 (2.06)	664.0 (26.14)
Average rainfall mm (inches)	1.0 (0.04)	0.1 (0.00)	2.4 (0.09)	5.3 (0.21)	26.1 (1.03)	55.1 (2.17)	79.5 (3.13)	84.2 (3.31)	107.3 (4.22)	59.8 (2.35)	14.4 (0.57)	0.9 (0.04)	436.1 (17.17)
Average snowfall cm (inches)	28.9 (11.4)	19.2 (7.6)	21.5 (8.5)	15.1 (5.9)	12.9 (5.1)	1.5 (0.6)	0.0 (0.0)	0.0 (0.0)	1.8 (0.7)	23.2 (9.1)	53.0 (20.9)	53.1 (20.9)	230.0 (90.6)
Average precipitation days (≥ 0.2 mm)	18.3	13.4	12.6	11.3	12.4	11.7	14.4	17.2	20.5	21.4	22.6	21.1	197.0
Average rainy days (≥ 0.2 mm)	0.43	0.25	0.95	2.6	7.7	10.6	14.0	17.1	20.2	15.5	5.2	1.1	95.5
Average snowy days (≥ 0.2 cm)	18.2	13.3	12.2	9.5	6.8	1.9	0.0	0.0	1.1	10.0	20.6	20.8	114.3
Average relative humidity (%) (at 1500 LST)	71.1	68.5	69.1	72.7	70.7	70.1	72.6	74.9	75.8	76.2	80.0	78.3	73.3
Mean monthly sunshine hours	71.7	112.7	155.8	165.2	166.4	205.0	213.5	163.7	81.8	64.4	34.2	40.0	1,474.3
Percentage possible sunshine	29.6	41.5	42.5	39.0	33.2	39.4	41.0	35.2	21.3	19.8	13.5	17.8	31.2
Source: Environment and Climate Change Canada (sun 1981–2010)

Climate data for Rankin Inlet (Rankin Inlet Airport) WMO ID: 71083; coordinates 62°49′N 92°07′W; elevation: 32.3 m (106 ft); 1991–2020 normals, extremes 1981–present
Month	Jan	Feb	Mar	Apr	May	Jun	Jul	Aug	Sep	Oct	Nov	Dec	Year
Record high humidex	−3.0	−3.6	1.1	2.5	13.4	27.5	32.2	31.8	23.4	12.7	1.4	0.8	32.2
Record high °C (°F)	−2.5 (27.5)	−3.4 (25.9)	1.3 (34.3)	3.4 (38.1)	14.1 (57.4)	26.8 (80.2)	28.9 (84.0)	30.5 (86.9)	21.0 (69.8)	13.3 (55.9)	1.5 (34.7)	0.9 (33.6)	30.5 (86.9)
Mean daily maximum °C (°F)	−26.6 (−15.9)	−25.8 (−14.4)	−20.3 (−4.5)	−11.1 (12.0)	−2.2 (28.0)	8.4 (47.1)	15.2 (59.4)	13.5 (56.3)	6.7 (44.1)	−1.4 (29.5)	−12.5 (9.5)	−20.7 (−5.3)	−6.4 (20.5)
Daily mean °C (°F)	−30.1 (−22.2)	−29.5 (−21.1)	−24.5 (−12.1)	−15.5 (4.1)	−5.5 (22.1)	4.6 (40.3)	10.9 (51.6)	10.1 (50.2)	4.2 (39.6)	−4.6 (23.7)	−17.0 (1.4)	−25.7 (−14.3)	−10.0 (14.0)
Mean daily minimum °C (°F)	−33.6 (−28.5)	−33.2 (−27.8)	−28.8 (−19.8)	−19.9 (−3.8)	−8.7 (16.3)	0.8 (33.4)	6.6 (43.9)	6.7 (44.1)	1.6 (34.9)	−6.6 (20.1)	−20.3 (−4.5)	−28.2 (−18.8)	−13.6 (7.5)
Record low °C (°F)	−46.1 (−51.0)	−49.8 (−57.6)	−43.4 (−46.1)	−36.1 (−33.0)	−24.6 (−12.3)	−9.4 (15.1)	−1.9 (28.6)	−1.4 (29.5)	−9.0 (15.8)	−27.4 (−17.3)	−36.8 (−34.2)	−43.6 (−46.5)	−49.8 (−57.6)
Record low wind chill	−66.8	−70.5	−64.4	−53.6	−37.8	−17.6	−5.3	−8.8	−18.1	−42.7	−55.3	−62.4	−70.5
Average precipitation mm (inches)	9.6 (0.38)	9.2 (0.36)	12.3 (0.48)	20.6 (0.81)	21.0 (0.83)	22.1 (0.87)	43.7 (1.72)	51.6 (2.03)	47.3 (1.86)	40.1 (1.58)	22.5 (0.89)	16.1 (0.63)	315.9 (12.44)
Average rainfall mm (inches)	0.0 (0.0)	0.0 (0.0)	0.0 (0.0)	1.1 (0.04)	7.3 (0.29)	19.6 (0.77)	43.5 (1.71)	51.6 (2.03)	44.7 (1.76)	14.7 (0.58)	0.5 (0.02)	0.1 (0.00)	183.2 (7.21)
Average snowfall cm (inches)	9.8 (3.9)	9.2 (3.6)	12.3 (4.8)	20.0 (7.9)	14.0 (5.5)	2.2 (0.9)	0.1 (0.0)	0.0 (0.0)	2.6 (1.0)	25.4 (10.0)	22.5 (8.9)	16.5 (6.5)	134.5 (53.0)
Average precipitation days (≥ 0.2 mm)	7.5	6.7	8.5	8.0	8.6	7.1	10.5	12.6	12.7	14.9	12.9	10.8	120.8
Average rainy days (≥ 0.2 mm)	0.08	0.04	0.04	0.75	2.6	6.0	10.5	12.6	10.9	4.4	0.50	0.17	48.6
Average snowy days (≥ 0.2 cm)	7.6	6.8	8.5	7.7	6.9	1.5	0.04	0.04	2.7	12.3	12.9	10.8	77.8
Average relative humidity (%) (at 1500 LST)	68.2	68.7	71.9	78.1	81.0	70.6	65.7	71.2	74.6	84.2	79.2	72.4	73.8
Source: Environment and Climate Change Canada Canadian Climate Normals 1991–2020

=== Waters ===
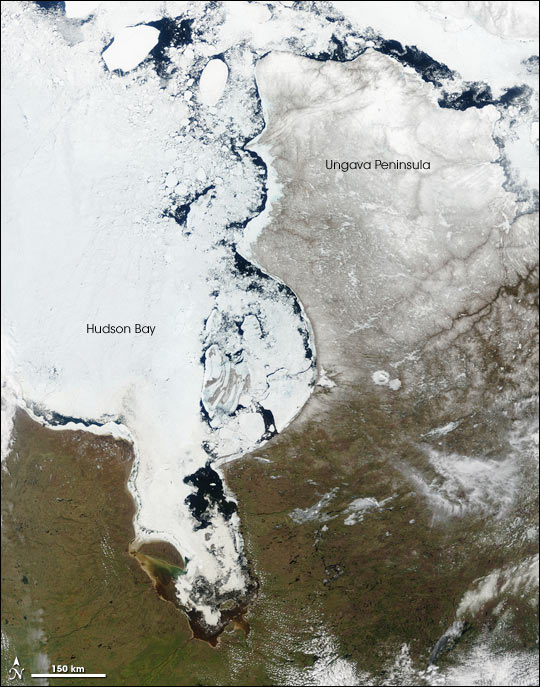
In late spring (May), large chunks of ice float near the eastern shore of the bay, while the centre of the bay remains frozen to the west. Between 1971 and 2007, the length of the ice-free season increased by about seven days in the southwestern part of the Hudson Bay, historically the last area to thaw.

Hudson Bay has a lower average salinity level than that of ocean water. The main causes are the low rate of evaporation (the bay is ice-covered for much of the year), the large volume of terrestrial runoff entering the bay (about 700 km^{3} (170 cu mi) annually, the Hudson Bay watershed covering much of Canada, many rivers and streams discharging into the bay), and the limited connection with the Atlantic Ocean and its higher salinity. Sea ice is about three times the annual river flow into the bay, and its annual freezing and thawing significantly alters the salinity of the surface layer. Although its exact effects are not fully understood currently, the cyclonic storms in the bay are responsible for synoptic variability of salinity along the coast.

One consequence of the lower salinity of the bay is that the freezing point of the water is higher than in the rest of the world's oceans, thus increasing the time that the bay is ice covered. Since 1960, the surge of river inflows during the winter has decreased the season of sea ice coverage by more than one month.

The lower salinity of the bay has effects on the distribution and prevalence of common marine life such as micro algae. Research has shown that the lower salinity of the Hudson Bay limits the growth of micro algae, which causes a notable change in biomass along the bay's salinity gradient.

=== Shores ===
The western shores of the bay are a lowland known as the Hudson Bay Lowlands, covering 370,000 km^{2} (140,000 sq mi), and are Canada's largest continuous peatland. Much of the landform has been shaped by the actions of glaciers and the shrinkage of the bay over long periods of time. The coastal area, in a region characterized by permanently frozen layers of soil, known as permafrost, is a low-lying wetland that receives water from lakes and fast-flowing rivers. Signs of numerous former beach fronts can be seen far inland from the current shore. A large portion of the lowlands in the Province of Ontario is part of the Polar Bear Provincial Park, and a similar portion of the lowlands in Manitoba is contained in Wapusk National Park, the latter location being a significant maternity denning area for polar bears.

In contrast, most of the eastern shores (the Quebec portion) form the western edge of the Canadian Shield in Quebec. The area is rocky and hilly. Its vegetation is typically boreal forest.The northern shores are tundra.

Measured by shoreline, Hudson Bay is the second-largest bay in the world (after the Bay of Bengal).

The distinctive arcuate segment on the eastern shore of Hudson Bay is referred to as the Nastapoka arc.

=== Islands ===
There are many islands in Hudson Bay, mostly near the eastern coast, all of which, including those in James Bay, are part of Nunavut and lie in the Arctic Archipelago. Several are disputed by the Cree.

Notable groups include the Belcher Islands in the centre of the Nastapoka arc, and the Ottawa Islands near the eastern shore of the Hudson Bay.

== Geology ==
The Hudson Bay Basin is a large structural depression that lies within the Canadian Shield. The collection and interpretation of outcrop, seismic and drill hole data for exploration for oil and gas reservoirs within the Hudson Bay basin found that it is filled by, at most, 2,500 m (8,200 ft) of Ordovician to Devonian limestone, dolomite, evaporites, black shales, and various clastic sedimentary rocks, which overlie less than 60 m (200 ft) of Cambrian strata that consist of unfossiliferous quartz sandstones and conglomerates, overlain by sandy and stromatolitic dolomites. In addition, a minor amount of terrestrial fluvial sands and gravels of the Cretaceous period are preserved in the fill of a prominent ring-like depression about 325–650 km (202–404 mi) across created by the dissolution of Silurian evaporites during the Cretaceous period.

From the large quantity of published geologic data that was collected during hydrocarbon exploration, academic research, and related geological mapping, a detailed history of the Hudson Bay Basin has been reconstructed. For the majority of the Cambrian Period, this area of the Canadian Shield was still topographically high and emergent, not a basin. During the later part of the Cambrian, it was slowly submerged by the rising sea level of the Sauk marine transgression. During the Ordovician, this part of the Canadian Shield continued to be submerged by rising sea levels except for a brief middle Ordovician marine regression. Finally starting in the Late Ordovician and continuing into the Silurian did the gradual regional subsidence of this part of the Canadian Shield form the Hudson Bay Basin. The formation of this basin resulted in the accumulation of black bituminous oil shale and evaporite deposits within its centre, thick basin-margin limestone and dolomite, and the development of extensive reefs that ringed the basin margins that were tectonically uplifted as the basin subsided. During Middle Silurian times, subsidence ceased and this basin was uplifted. It generated an emergent arch, on which reefs grew, that divided the basin into eastern and western sub-basins. During the Devonian Period, the basin filled with terrestrial red beds that interfinger with marine limestone and dolomites. Before deposition was terminated by marine regression, Upper Devonian black bituminous shale accumulated in the south-east of the basin.

The remaining history of the Hudson Bay Basin is largely unknown as a major unconformity separates Upper Devonian strata from glacial deposits of the Pleistocene. Except for poorly known terrestrial Cretaceous fluvial sands and gravels that are preserved as the fills of a ring of subsided strata around the centre of this basin, strata representing this period of time are absent from the Hudson Bay Basin and the surrounding Canadian Shield.

The Precambrian Shield underlying Hudson Bay, and in which the basin formed, is composed of two Archean proto-continents, the Western Churchill and Superior cratons. These cratons are separated by a tectonic collage that forms a suture zone between them and the Trans-Hudson Orogen. The Western Churchill and Superior cratons collided at about 1.9–1.8 Ga in the Trans-Hudson orogeny. Because of the irregular shapes of the colliding cratons, this collision trapped between them large fragments of juvenile crust, a sizable microcontinent, and island arc terranes beneath what is now the centre of modern Hudson Bay as part of the Trans-Hudson Orogen. The Belcher Islands are the eroded surface of the Belcher Fold Belt, which formed as a result of the tectonic compression and folding of sediments that accumulated along the margin of the Superior Craton before its collision with the Western Churchill Craton.

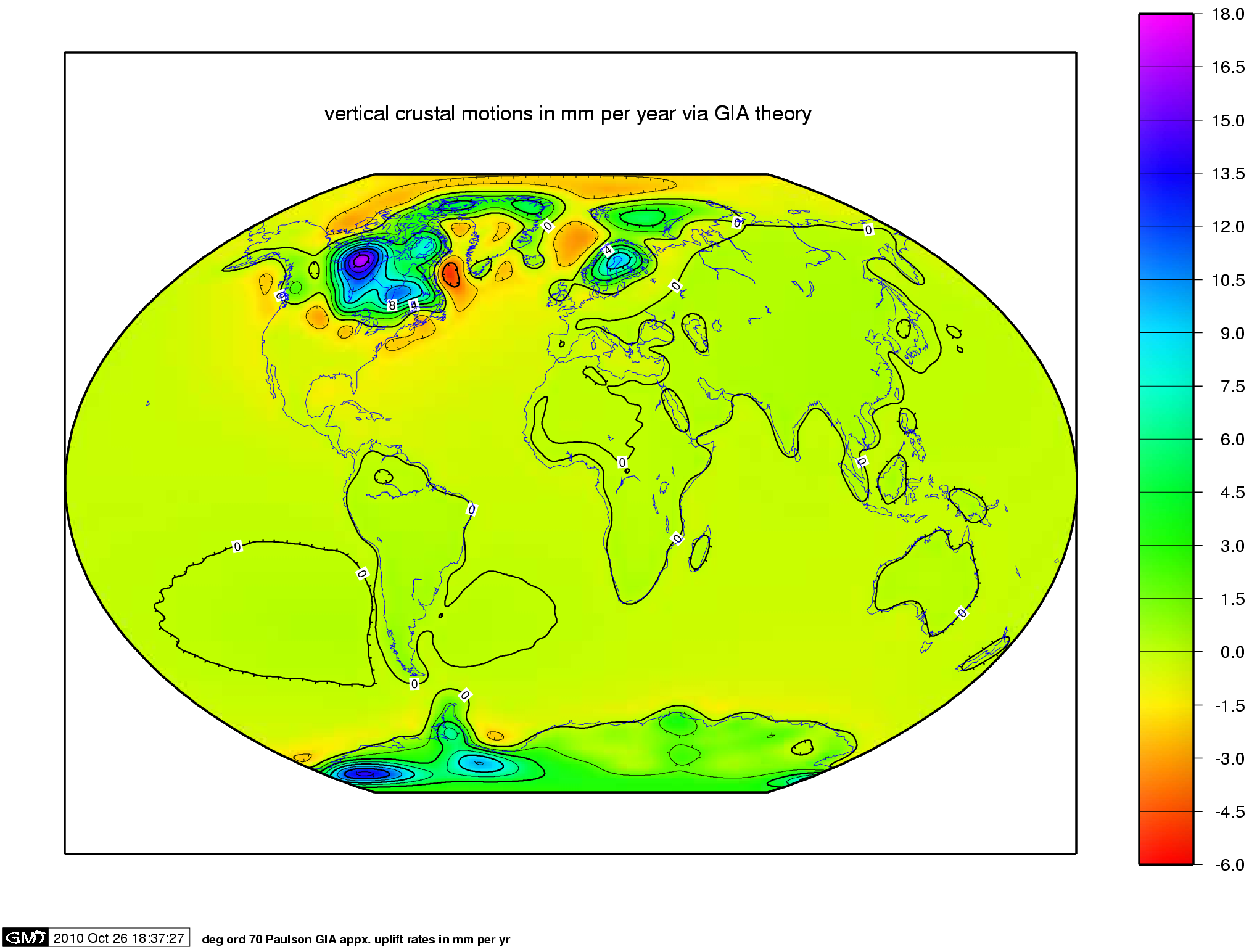
Map of post-glacial rebound. Hudson Bay is in the region of the most rapid uplift.

=== Free-air gravity anomaly ===
Hudson Bay and the associated structural basin lie within the centre of a large free-air gravity anomaly that lies within the Canadian Shield. The similarity in areal extent of the free-air gravity anomaly with the perimeter of the former Laurentide ice sheet that covered this part of Laurentia led to a long-held conclusion that this perturbation in the Earth's gravity reflected still ongoing glacial isostatic adjustment to the melting and disappearance of this ice sheet. Data collected over Canada by the Gravity Recovery and Climate Experiment (GRACE) satellite mission allowed geophysicists to isolate the gravity signal associated with glacial isostatic adjustment from longer–time scale process of mantle convection occurring beneath the Canadian Shield. Based upon this data, geophysicists and other Earth scientists concluded that the Laurentide Ice Sheet was composed of two large domes to the west and east of Hudson Bay. Modelling glacial isostatic adjustment using the GRACE data, they concluded that ≈25 to ≈45% of the observed free-air gravity anomaly was due to ongoing glacial isostatic adjustment, and the remainder likely represents longer time-scale effects of mantle convection.

=== Southeastern semicircle ===
Earth scientists have disagreed about what created the semicircular feature known as the Nastapoka arc that forms a section of the shoreline of southeastern Hudson Bay. The Nastapoka arc forms a 155 degree curve and appears to be very circular. Noting the paucity of impact structures on Earth in relation to the Moon and Mars, Carlyle S. Beals proposed that it is possibly part of a Precambrian extraterrestrial impact structure that is comparable in size to the Mare Crisium on the Moon. In the same volume, John Tuzo Wilson commented on Beals' interpretation and alternately proposed that the Nastapoka arc may have formed as part of an extensive Precambrian continental collisional orogen, linked to the closure of an ancient ocean basin. The current general consensus is that it is an arcuate boundary of tectonic origin between the Belcher Fold Belt and undeformed basement of the Superior Craton created during the Trans-Hudson orogeny. This is because no credible evidence for such an impact structure has been found by regional magnetic, Bouguer gravity, or other geologic studies. However, other Earth scientists have proposed that the evidence of an Archean impact might have been masked by deformation accompanying the later formation of the Trans-Hudson orogen and regard an impact origin as a plausible possibility.

== Economy ==
The Arctic Bridge shipping route (blue line) is hoped to link North America to markets in Europe and Asia using ice-free routes across the Arctic Ocean

=== Arctic Bridge ===
The longer periods of ice-free navigation and the reduction of Arctic Ocean ice coverage have led to Russian and Canadian interest in the potential for commercial trade routes across the Arctic and into Hudson Bay. The so-called Arctic Bridge would link Churchill, Manitoba, and the Russian port of Murmansk. The increase in ships traversing the proposed Arctic Bridge could result in an increase in accidents. Any pollutants released into the environment would be harder to remove as the cleanup would be complicated by ice sheets.

=== Port ===
Churchill, Manitoba, hosts both the largest and only deep-water port on Hudson Bay. Built at the mouth of the Churchill River, routes from the now privately-owned port connect to the North Atlantic through the Hudson Strait. As of 2008, the port had four deep-sea berths capable of handling Panamax-size vessels for the loading and unloading of grain, bulk commodities, general cargo, and tanker vessels. The port is connected to the Hudson Bay Railway, which shares the same parent company, and cargo connections are made with the Canadian National Railway system at HBR's southern terminus in The Pas. It is the only port of its size and scope in Canada that does not connect directly to the country's road system; all goods shipped overland to and from the port must travel by rail. Additionally, it is the only ocean-accessible port within the Prairie provinces.

The port was built and owned by the Government of Canada, but was sold in 1997 to the American company OmniTRAX to run privately. In December 2015, OmniTRAX announced it was negotiating a sale of the port, and the associated Hudson Bay Railway, to a group of First Nations based in northern Manitoba. With no sale finalized by July 2016, OmniTRAX shut down the port and the major railroad freight operations in August 2016. The railway continued to carry cargo to supply the town of Churchill itself until the line was damaged by flooding on 23 May 2017. The Port and the Hudson Bay Railway were sold to Arctic Gateway Group—a consortium of First Nations, local governments, and corporate investors—in 2018. On 9 July 2019, ships resupplying Arctic communities began stopping at the port for additional cargo, and the port began shipping grain again on 7 September 2019.

== Coastal communities ==
The coast of Hudson Bay is extremely sparsely populated; there are only about a dozen communities. Some of these were founded as trading posts in the 17th and 18th centuries by the Hudson's Bay Company, making them some of the oldest settlements in Western Canada. With the closure of the HBC posts and stores, although many are now run by The North West Company, in the second half of the 20th century, many coastal villages are now almost exclusively populated by Cree and Inuit. Two main historic sites along the coast were York Factory and Prince of Wales Fort.

Communities along the Hudson Bay coast or on islands in the bay are (all populations are as of 2016):

- Nunavut
  - Arviat, population 2,657
  - Chesterfield Inlet, population 437
  - Coral Harbour, population 891
  - Rankin Inlet, population 2,842
  - Sanikiluaq, population 882
  - Whale Cove, population 435
- Manitoba
  - Churchill, population 899
- Ontario
  - Fort Severn First Nation, population 361
- Quebec
  - Akulivik, population 633
  - Inukjuak, population 1,757
  - Kuujjuarapik, population 686
  - Puvirnituq, population 1,779
  - Umiujaq, population 442
  - Whapmagoostui, population 984

=== Military development ===
The Hudson's Bay Company built forts as fur trade strongholds, primarily against the French. One example is York Factory, with angled walls to bolster defence. In the 1950s, during the Cold War, a few sites along the coast became part of the Mid-Canada Line, watching for a potential Soviet bomber attack over the North Pole. The only Arctic deep-water port in Canada is the Port of Churchill, Manitoba.

== See also ==
- Great Recycling and Northern Development Canal – Proposed dam on James Bay and interlinking of Canadian and American rivers
- Lake Agassiz – Large lake in central North America at the end of the last glacial period
- Tyrrell Sea – Prehistoric sea covering Hudson Bay

== General sources ==
- Atlas of Canada, online version.
- Some references of geological/impact structure interest include:
  - Rondot, Jehan (1994). "Recognition of eroded astroblemes". Earth-Science Reviews 35, 4, pp. 331–365.
  - Wilson, J. Tuzo (1968). "Comparison of the Hudson Bay arc with some other features". In: Science, History and Hudson Bay, v. 2. Beals, C. S. (editor), pp. 1015–1033.
- Tyrrell, Joseph Burr (1931). Tyrrell, Joseph Burr (ed.). Documents Relating to the Early History of Hudson Bay: The Publications of the Champlain Society. Toronto: Champlain Society. doi:10.3138/9781442618336. ISBN 978-1-4426-1833-6.
