= Eira Friesen =

Welsh-born Canadian community activist

Eira Friesen (1 April 1917 – 11 December 2008) was a Welsh-born Canadian community activist, inducted into the Order of Canada in 2003 for services to women in Manitoba.

== Early life and education ==
Eira Alice Charles was born in Wales, the daughter of Major John Leslie Charles, chief engineer for the Canadian National Railway, and Helena Violet Hamilton Charles. Her brother John Hamilton Charles was killed in action during World War II, in 1942, as a member of the Royal Canadian Air Force. Eira attended St. Mary's Academy as a young woman, and earned a bachelor's degree from the University of Manitoba.

== Career ==
Eira "Babs" Friesen started the Y-Neighbours, an early at-home mothers' support and social program in Winnipeg, based in YWCA locations. In 1973 she also helped found the YWCA's Women's Resource Centre in 1973, before there were other options for women in western Canada. She volunteered at the women's centre full-time for over 28 years. In 1985 she was part of Canada's delegation at the Third World Conference on Women in Nairobi, and again in 1995, when the Fourth World Conference on Women was held in Beijing.

Eira "Babs" Friesen received the Governor General's Award in 2003, and was inducted into the Order of Canada in that same year. Her Order of Canada citation stated, "She has helped countless women to take a stand, improve their lives, and thrive in a community of peers." She was one of the twenty recipients of the Queen's Golden Jubilee Medals allotted to the National Council of Women of Canada.

== Personal life and legacy ==
Eira Charles married Rhinehart Friesen, an obstetrician, in 1944, while he was in the Royal Canadian Army Medical Corps. They had four children together. She died in 2008, age 91, in Winnipeg. Rhinehart died within two months after Eira.

The Manitoba Women's Advisory Council and the YMCA-YWCA of Winnipeg present an annual Eira "Babs" Friesen Lifetime Achievement Award to honour contributions to women's equality in Winnipeg.

A scrapbook of Eira Friesen's is in the collection of the University of Manitoba Archives.
