= Beyond the Steel =

The documentary Beyond the Steel, filmed over four years, records the relocation of an industrial town in northern Manitoba. The film was produced and directed by Frank Holmes, a Manitoban filmmaker. From 1950 to 1953 the town of Sherridon, Manitoba was relocated to Lynn Lake, Manitoba.

The film is preserved in the Manitoba Legislature's official library.
