= Hudson Bay Railway (1997) =

Canadian short line railway

- HBRY in black and KR in grey

Overview
- Headquarters: The Pas, Manitoba
- Reporting mark: HBRY
- Locale: northern Manitoba
- Dates of operation: 1997–

Technical
- Track gauge: 4 ft 8 1/2 in (1,435 mm) standard gauge
- Length: 1,300 kilometres (810 mi)

Other
- Website: Hudson Bay Railway

Hudson Bay Railway (reporting mark HBRY) is a Canadian short line railway operating over 1,300 kilometres (810 mi) of track in northeastern Saskatchewan and northern Manitoba.

HBRY was formed by railroad holding company OmniTRAX in July 1997 to purchase former Canadian National Railway (CN) rail lines running north from The Pas on two branches, one to Flin Flon and on to Lynn Lake, the other to Thompson and on to the Port of Churchill on Hudson Bay. Operations began on August 20, 1997.

Subsequently, OmniTRAX also assumed operation and marketing of the Port of Churchill from Transport Canada. Previous owner CN had limited the allowable tonnage to operate on the lines as a result of the light rail and poor track base. However, the HBRY has been able to successfully operate heavier, longer trains without difficulty, resulting in increased business to the Port of Churchill and from various mines and pulp mills.

HBRY is a vital transportation link in northern Manitoba, hauling ores and concentrates, copper, zinc, logs, kraft paper, lumber, and petroleum products. Via Rail also uses HBRY tracks to operate its Winnipeg–Churchill train between The Pas and Churchill.

Major customers for HBRY include Hudbay, Tolko, Vale, Gardwine North, Stittco Energy, Farmers of North America, and formerly, the Canadian Wheat Board.

== History ==
The line was constructed by an earlier company of the same name. The Hudson Bay Railway was built starting in the early 1900s under Canadian Northern Railway before being taken over by the Government of Canada and completed in 1929. The lines were operated by Canadian National Railway from 1929-1997 before being sold to OmniTRAX.

The railway was proposed by Edward Alexander Partridge as part of his Partridge Plan illustrated in the Grain Growers' Guide. This was his solution to being able to ship wheat directly to Europe.

=== Route ===
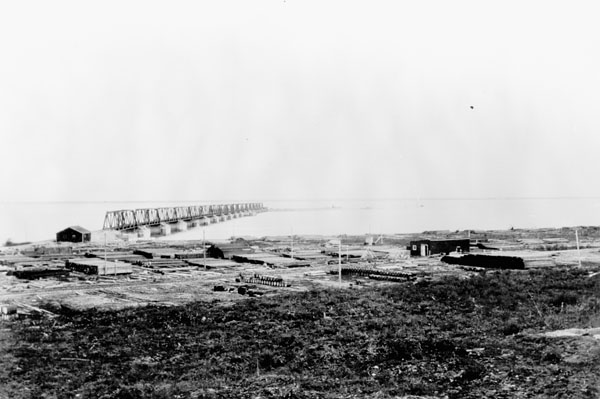
The rail line's initial choice of port, Port Nelson, required a long causeway, to the centre of the silty Nelson River.

Originally, the Hudson Bay port where the rail line was to terminate was to have been Port Nelson, at the mouth of the Nelson River, which drains Lake Winnipeg. During World War I construction of the rail line was suspended, to divert resources to the war effort. When construction was recommenced in 1926 the decision was made that maintaining a port on the Nelson River would have too many ongoing expenses, and that the port should be relocated to the mouth of the Churchill River.

The Nelson River has a greater volume of flow, and contains more silt. A channel several miles long would have to be regularly dredged. In addition, the river's mouth was wide, and shallow. An artificial island had been built, to house the pier, with a 900 metres (3,000 ft) causeway. The Churchill River's mouth was deeper, clearer, and required less on-going dredging.

This change of port is the reason the rail line, having traveled north-east all the way from The Pas turns abruptly and almost directly north slightly to the west after passing Gillam, at Amery. The former railway to Port Nelson is still easily discernible on satellite maps.

=== 2005 washout ===
On July 27, 2005, heavy rains washed out part of the railroad between The Pas and Pukatawagan; all service over the line, including Via Rail trains 690 and 691, was suspended while repairs took place. Service was restored on August 2, 2005, two days ahead of initial expectations.

=== 2006 sale of Keewatin Railway ===
On April 1, 2006, the Hudson Bay Railway sold the former CN Sherridon Subdivision, between Sheritt Junction and Lynn Lake, to the three First Nations in the area, who now own and operate the railway, running twice-weekly mixed (passenger plus freight) trains.

=== 2017 washout and extended outage ===
On May 23, 2017, OmniTRAX announced that due to unprecedented flooding, the line was closed indefinitely between Amery and Churchill, pending evaluation of the damages and repairs. Loss of rail service, both passenger and freight, impacted the tourism industry and imposed other costs on Churchill's already fragile economy. Churchill, and other northern communities where cargo had to be delivered by air, faced skyrocketing prices for staples such as groceries and fuel.

Due to a disagreement over what entity was responsible for repair costs, it was uncertain whether the line would ever be repaired. The Canadian government filed an $18 million lawsuit against OmniTRAX for breach of contract. The position of Canada's Natural Resources Minister, Jim Carr, was that "Omnitrax Inc. had legal obligations to repair the rail line and its tracks, citing a contract that required OmniTRAX to "operate, maintain and repair the entire Hudson Bay Railway Line in a diligent and timely manner until March 31, 2029." The position of OmniTRAX was that the extensive flooding constitutes a force majeure that excused it from fulfilling the contract.

=== Sale to Arctic Gateway Group ===
In August 2018, the line and port was sold to the Arctic Gateway Group which contracted Cando Rail Services Ltd. and Paradox Access Solutions to begin repairing the line. The group, at the time, was a public-private partnership 50% owned by Missinippi Rail (a consortium of Manitoba communities and First Nations), and 50% owned jointly by Fairfax Financial Holdings and AGT Food and Ingredients.

On August 31, 2018, the federal government announced that they would be helping to fund the purchase of the railway, and port facilities, back from Omnitrax. $43 million of the $117 million the federal government committed is a grant to help cover operating costs for the first three years of Arctic Gateway Group's operations.

On November 1, 2018, Prime Minister Justin Trudeau helped welcome the first train to arrive in Churchill in 18 months. The first passenger train traveled the line a month later.

Fairfax and AGT transferred their shares of Arctic Gateway Group to OneNorth (formerly Missinippi Rail) in March 2021, making Arctic Gateway and HBRY completely owned by the local government and Indigenous investors.

Between 2023 and 2024 a significant reconstruction efforts were completed with investment from the Arctic Gateway Group.

In November 2025, the provincial government in Manitoba announced funding to help upgrade the line to bring it up to Class I status, in order to support increased shipments of commodities.

In 2026, the railway carried grain shipments for the first time in six years. It also carried small shipments of zinc and potash.

== Accidents ==
A train carrying liquified petroleum gas derailed on September 16, 2018. One member of the train's crew died, and two other crew members were hospitalized. The train consisted of 3 locomotives, and 27 tanker cars. The train was crossing a creek near Ponton, Manitoba, when it derailed. Arctic Gateway Group reported no oil was spilled.

== Passenger service ==
There are two VIA Rail passenger trains a week each way between Winnipeg and Churchill, called the Winnipeg–Churchill train, taking about 45 hours, and one from Churchill to The Pas.

== See also ==
- Port Nelson dredge
- Seaport of the Prairies
