= Nuvuk Islands =

Island group in Nunavut, Canada

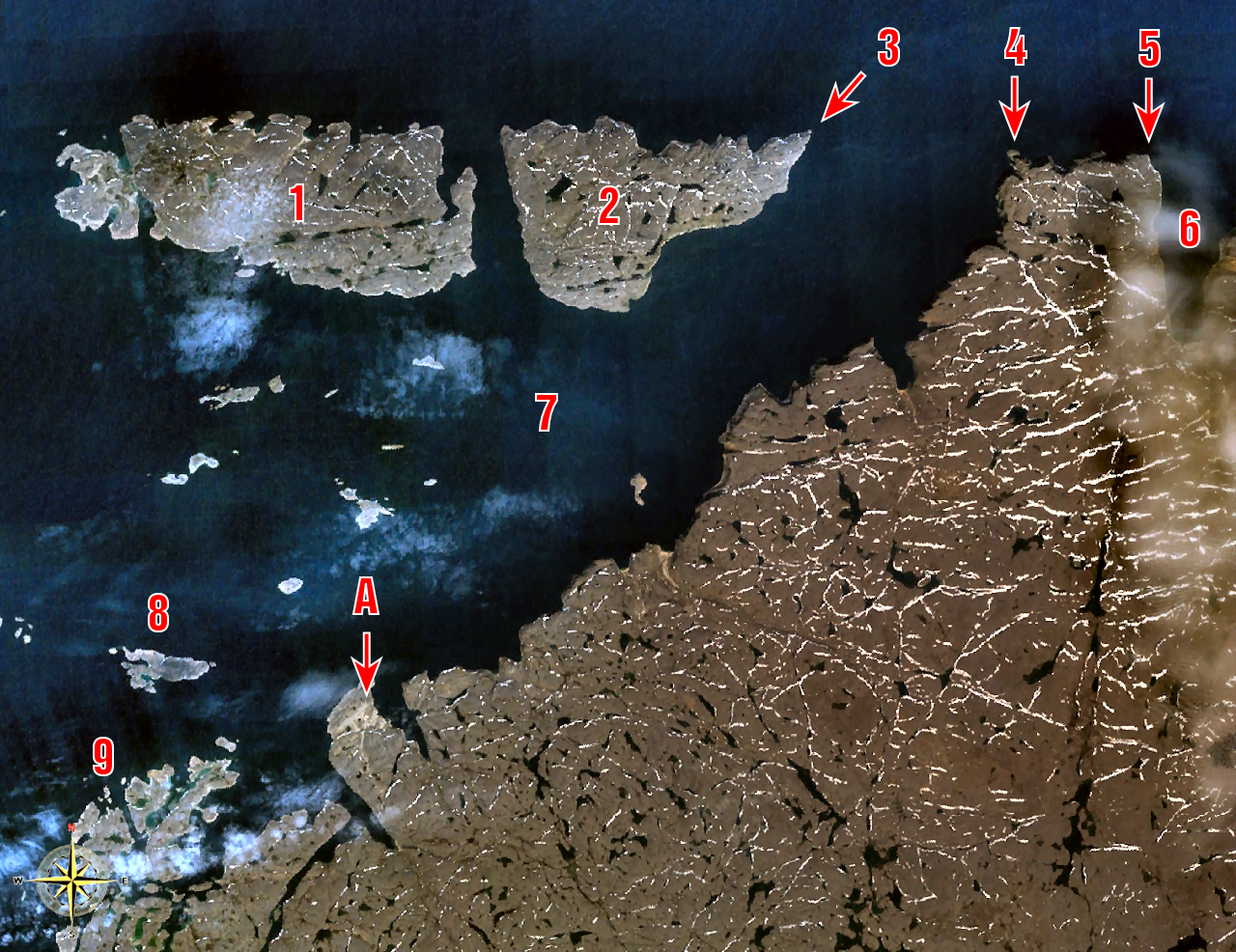
- Nuvuk Islands in the lower left corner (identified with No. 9).

- Location within Nunavut Location within Canada

Geography
- Location: Hudson Bay
- Coordinates: 62°24′N 078°03′W
- Archipelago: Arctic Archipelago

Administration
- Canada
- Territory: Nunavut
- Region: Qikiqtaaluk

Demographics
- Population: Uninhabited
- Source: Nuvuk Islands at Atlas of Canada

The uninhabited Nuvuk Islands, members of the Arctic Archipelago, are located in the Hudson Bay, at the western outlet of Digges Sound, just west of the Ungava Peninsula. The island group is a part of the Qikiqtaaluk Region, in the Canadian territory of Nunavut.
