= Seaport of the Prairies =

1925 film by Frank Holmes

- Directed by: Frank Holmes
- Release date: 1925
- Running time: 64 minutes
- Country: Canada
- Language: English

Seaport of the Prairies is a documentary film made in 1925, in an attempt to revive the construction of a railroad line to a new deepwater port at Port Nelson, Manitoba. It follows a journey of a group of prominent citizens as they transit the route.

The two-reel silent film was originally filmed on 35 mm acetate film, a technology abandoned because the film stock was unstable, prone to decay, and was highly flammable. The only known existing print is a copy to 16 mm conventional film stock. The film is approximately an hour long.

Director Frank Holmes was just 17 years old when he made the film.

The port, and rail link, were worked on from 1913 to 1917. The project was left incomplete, when World War I required its construction resources.

When funds were found to complete the project, its destination was changed from Port Nelson to Churchill, Manitoba, due to technical problems with maintaining a port at Port Nelson.

The party left The Pas, Manitoba, in an chartered train, travelling across northern Manitoba, to "the end of steel", at Kettle Rapids, Manitoba, where resources to build the railway ran out. They then proceeded by canoe to near the port facilities, where they transferred to "Government boats".

Holmes had to go to court to receive his payment for making the film.
