= Frank Holmes (filmmaker) =

- Born: 1908
- Died: 1990 (aged 81–82); Toronto, Canada
- Other names: Francis Joseph Sloan Holmes
- Occupation: Filmmaker
- Known for: Filming the documentary Seaport of the Prairies

Frank Holmes (1908–1990) was one of Manitoba's first filmmakers, filming the documentary Seaport of the Prairies in 1925 when he was just 17 years old. He is also remembered for the documentaries Beyond the Steel and Each Year They Come.

Holmes had to go to court to receive his payment for making Seaport of the Prairies.

In 1928, he produced Forest Fire Fighters of the Skies.

The Archives of Manitoba preserves 29 reels of his films.
