= AGT Food and Ingredients =

Canadian food company

AGT Food and Ingredients Inc.
- Type: Public Company
- Industry: Agriculture
- Founded: 2001
- Headquarters: Regina, Saskatchewan, Canada
- Number of locations: 47 facilities (2016)
- Area served: Worldwide
- Key people: Murad Al-Katib (President and CEO); Hüseyin Arslan (Executive Chairman)
- Revenue: ▲CA$1.9 billion (2016)
- Operating income: ▲CA$83 million (2016)
- Net income: ▲CA$21 million (2016)
- Total assets: ▼CA$1.3 billion (2016)
- Total equity: ▼CA$0.3 billion (2016)
- Number of employees: 1,900 (2016)

AGT Food and Ingredients is a Canadian processor of pulses and other food ingredients. It is one of the largest pulse-processing companies in the world.

== History ==
AGT was founded in 2001 as SaskCan Pulse Trading by Murad Al-Katib, the present CEO. He received funding from the Arslan family of Turkey, owners of the Arbel group, a Turkish pulse-processing company. Murad Al-Katib won the 2016 EY Entrepreneur of the year in Canada and the 2017 EY World Entrepreneur Of The Year. Murad Al-Katib was honored with the Lifetime Achievement Award of the University of Saskatchewan Alumni Association.

In 2007, the Agtech Income Fund acquired SaskCan, and then renamed itself Alliance Grain Traders. As a result of this deal, Alliance Grain Traders was listed on Toronto Venture Exchange.

In 2009, Alliance Grain Traders converted from an income fund to a normal corporation. Also in 2009, Alliance Grain Traders bought the Arbel group for $104 million, including its pasta business.

In 2011, the company took over South Africa based Advance Seed. Since 2012, it has shifted into the packaged foods business. In particular, it has expanded production at its facility in Minot, North Dakota.

In 2014, the company was renamed AGT Food and Ingredients. In 2015, AGT bought Big Sky Rail, a Saskatchewan short line railway, for $57.5 million. In 2018, it was part of the consortium that purchased the Hudson Bay Railway.

On February 5, 2019, the company announced shareholder approval for a privatization deal led by its President and Chief Executive Officer, Murad Al-Katib, in consortium with Fairfax Financial and Point North Capital. On April 17, 2019, the transaction to take the company private was closed.

== Business ==
AGT buys, processes, and distributes pulses, including lentils, peas, and beans, as well as grains and other agricultural commodities. It also manufactures and distributes food ingredients and packaged foods. In 2016, pulses were responsible for 58% of sales, milled grains for 7%, and rices and other products for 35%. As of 2016, 58% of revenue was from pulse and grain processing, 28% was from distribution, and the other 14% was from food ingredients and packaged foods. It has facilities in Canada, the United States, Turkey, China, South Africa, and Australia. In 2016, 6% of sales were in Canada, 12% were in the rest of the Americas, 28% were in Asia-Pacific, and the other 54% were in Europe, the Middle East, and North Africa.
