= Arctic Gateway Group =

Company

Arctic Gateway Group LP
- Type: Limited partnership
- Industry: Transportation
- Founded: 2018; 8 years ago
- Headquarters: The Pas, Manitoba, Canada
- Area served: Northern Region, Manitoba
- Owner: OneNorth
- Divisions: Port of Churchill; Hudson Bay Railway
- Website: arcticgateway.com

Arctic Gateway Group LP is a limited partnership that owns and operates the Port of Churchill and the Hudson Bay Railway, which connects The Pas to Churchill, Manitoba. It was originally formed as a public-private partnership; with a fifty percent share held by Missinippi Rail, a consortium of northern Manitoba First Nations and local governments, and the private share split between Toronto-based Fairfax Financial Holdings and Regina-based grains company AGT Food and Ingredients. Fairfax and AGT transferred their shares of Arctic Gateway to OneNorth (formerly Missinippi Rail) in March 2021, meaning that Arctic Gateway is completely owned by the local governments and Indigenous partners.

In March 2025 the federal government announced it is contributing $175 million for upgrades on the Hudson Bay Railway line. At the meeting between the prime minister Mark Carney and the provincial premier Kinew in November 2025, the Manitoba provincial government announced funding of $51 million, in addition to $87.5 million allocated beforehand. Plans for possible realignment were discussed by Kinew.

== Operations ==
On November 19, 2018, Murad Al-Katib, CEO of AGT Food and Ingredients announced that freight service along the HBR had begun and that passenger service was expected to begin by the end of November. The first Via Rail passenger train service along the repaired HBR line arrived on December 4, 2018.

While grain had traditionally been the major cargo shipped from the port, AGT CEO Al-Katib said the partnership would look into shipping potash, ore and petroleum products. Al-Katib also said one possible revenue source could be foreign eco-tourists.
