= Pennyworth (ship) =

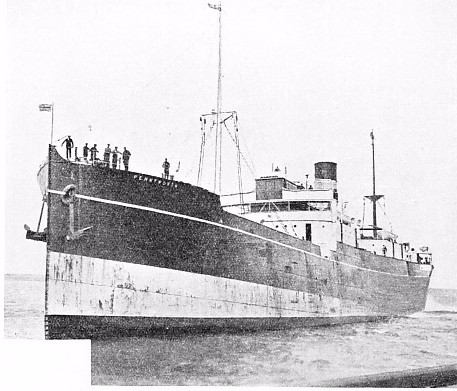
Pennyworth was the first freighter to bring cargo to Churchill's new port facilities, in 1932.

Pennyworth was a freighter, built in Scotland in 1916. She was the first freighter to carry cargo to Canada's newly opened deepwater port on the Arctic Ocean, at Churchill, Manitoba.

She arrived on August 17, 1932, carrying a mixed cargo of liquor, china and glass tableware, binding twine, and lubricating oil, as well as a few passengers. She was the first freighter to arrive again in 1933, on August 13, 1933.
