= Farmers of North America =

Canadian agricultural company

- Industry: Agriculture
- Founded: 1998
- Headquarters: Saskatoon, Canada
- Website: fna.ca

Farmers of North America (FNA), also known as Farms and Families of North America Inc., is a Canadian agricultural association headquartered in Saskatoon, Saskatchewan.

== History ==
Incorporated in March 1998 by a rural Saskatchewan farm family, FNA has over 10,000 producers representing more than 20,000,000 acres (81,000 km^{2}) across Canada. In October 2014, Farmers of North America expanded into the United States.

The programs FNA negotiate with suppliers include fertilizers, animal health products, grain storage, handling equipment, fencing, agricultural leasing, oils and lubricants, and tires and management services.

FNA is a privately owned for-profit company organized as a business alliance of individual farmers. It describes itself as "a farm business alliance with the mission of maximizing farm profitability".

In 2012, FNA announced it had formed a limited partnership, FNA Fertilizer Limited Partnership or FNA FLP, with the intention of building a new nitrogen fertilizer plant in Western Canada. FNA FLP is an independent partnership composed of the farmers who fund it.
