= Manitoba Provincial Road 287 =

Provincial Road in Manitoba, Canada

Provincial Road 287
- PR 287 highlighted in red

Route information
- Maintained by Department of Infrastructure
- Length: 57.8 km (35.9 mi)
- Existed: 1966–present

Major junctions
- West end: PTH 10 at Prospector
- PR 384 at Clearwater Lake Provincial Park
- East end: Cormorant

Location
- Country: Canada
- Province: Manitoba

Highway system
- Provincial highways in Manitoba; Winnipeg City Routes
← PR 285	→ PR 289

Provincial Road 287 (PR 287) is a 57.8-kilometre-long (35.9 mi) east–west highway in the NorMan Region of Manitoba, providing the only road access to Clearwater Lake Provincial Park, The Pas Airport, Cormorant, and via its spur PR 384, Moose Lake.

== Route description ==
PR 287 begins as a paved two-lane highway at the locality of Prospector at an intersection with PTH 10, within Clearwater Lake Provincial Park. It heads east through the park, travelling along the southern shoreline of Clearwater Lake for several kilometres to pass along the north side of The Pas Airport. After curving through some wooded areas, the highway returns to the lakeshore, passing several lakeside cottages at an intersection with PR 384, which leads to Moose Lake. At a fork in the road, where PR 287 takes a right, the pavement ends, with PR 287 leaving the Provincial Park heading northeast through inland wooded areas of Cormorant Provincial Forest as a two-lane gravel road. The highway travels along the southern shoreline of Cormorant Lake for several kilometres before entering the hamlet of Cormorant, immediately making a right onto Fenner Street to cross a bridge over the narrow portion of the lake before coming to an end in the centre of town at an intersection with Station Road, directly beside the Winnipeg-Churchill Train (Hudson Bay Railway), which the highway ran parallel to for the majority of its length.

== Major intersections ==
Division	Location	km	mi	Destinations	Notes
No. 21	Prospector	0.0	0.0	PTH 10 – The Pas, Flin Flon	Western terminus
Town of The Pas		10.9	6.8	The Pas Airport	Access road into airport
No. 21	Clearwater Lake Provincial Park	18.5	11.5	PR 384 south – Moose Lake	Northern terminus of PR 384
No. 21	Clearwater Lake Provincial Park	19.4	12.1	Pavement ends	
No. 21	Cormorant	57.2	35.5	Bridge over Cormorant Lake Narrows	
No. 21	Cormorant	57.8	35.9	Fenner Street / Station Road	Eastern terminus
1.000 mi = 1.609 km; 1.000 km = 0.621 mi

== Related route ==
Provincial Road 384
- Location: Clearwater Lake Provincial Park - Moose Lake
- Length: 39.3 km (24.4 mi)
- Existed: 1994–present

Provincial Road 384 (PR 384) is a 39.3-kilometre-long (24.4 mi) north-south spur of PR 287 in the NorMan Region of Manitoba, providing the only road access to the hamlet of Moose Lake, the Mosakahiken Cree Nation, as well as the Moose Lakes, all of which are located in Saskatchewan River Delta. It is entirely a two-lane gravel road, with its only other major intersection being an access road to some reserves, North Moose Lake, and the Moose Lake Narrows Control Structure.

Division	Location	km	mi	Destinations	Notes
Mosakahiken Cree Nation	Moose Lake	0.0	0.0	Birch Street / Martin Road	Southern terminus
Mosakahiken Cree Nation		3.9	2.4	Moose Lake 31D	Access road into reserve
Mosakahiken Cree Nation		19.1	11.9	Moose Lake 31G, Moose Lake Control Structure, North Moose Lake	Access road
No. 21	Clearwater Lake Provincial Park	39.3	24.4	PR 287 – The Pas, Cormorant	Northern terminus
1.000 mi = 1.609 km; 1.000 km = 0.621 mi
