= Manitoba Highway 39 =

Highway in Manitoba

Provincial Trunk Highway 39
- PTH 30 highlighted in red

Route information
- Maintained by Department of Infrastructure
- Length: 164 km (102 mi)
- Existed: 1987–present

Major junctions
- West end: PTH 10 in Grass River Provincial Park
- PR 392 in Snow Lake
- East end: PTH 6 at Ponton

Location
- Country: Canada
- Province: Manitoba
- Towns: Snow Lake

Highway system
- Provincial highways in Manitoba; Winnipeg City Routes
← PTH 34	→ PTH 41

Provincial Trunk Highway 39 (PTH 39) is a provincial highway in the Canadian province of Manitoba. It runs from PTH 6 (to Thompson) to PTH 10 (to Flin Flon).

The highway serves as the main east–west crossing of Grass River Provincial Park and Division No. 21, as well as providing road access to Snow Lake. The speed limit is 100 km/h (62 mph).

== Route description ==
PTH 39 begins within Grass River Provincial Park at an intersection with PTH 10 a few kilometers south of Cranberry Portage, with the road heading east, winding its way across the entire length of the park, traveling past several large lakes and campgrounds, such as the Cranberry Lakes and Reed Lake. The highway exits the park, passing by Tramping Lake and crossing Hayward Creek to have an intersection with PR 392 within the city limits Snow Lake. It travels along the southern coastline of Wekusko Lake for a few kilometers to have an intersection with access road to Herb Lake Landing. PTH 39 now goes through some sharp curves for the next several kilometers, where it has an intersection with PR 596 and begin paralleling the Mitishto River. The highway now straightens out, crossing the river and coming to an end at an intersection with PTH 6 near Ponton.

The entire length of Manitoba Highway 39 is a rural, paved, two-lane highway traveling through the woodlands of Division No. 21.

== History ==
Together with the section of PTH 6 between Ponton and Thompson, PTH 39 was originally designated as PR 391. A further, more northerly and only partly paved section of Provincial Road 391, doubling back westward from Thompson to Lynn Lake, continues to bear that designation.

== Major intersections ==
Division	Location	km	mi	Destinations	Notes
No. 21	Grass River Provincial Park	0.0	0.0	PTH 10 – The Pas, Flin Flon	Western terminus
Town of Snow Lake		100.5	62.4	PR 392 north – Snow Lake, Wekusko Falls Provincial Park	Southern terminus of PR 392
Town of Snow Lake		113.5	70.5	Herb Lake Landing	Access road to Herb Lake Landing
No. 21		118.4	73.6	PR 596 south – Wekusko	Northern terminus of PR 596
No. 21	Ponton	164	102	PTH 6 – Thompson, Winnipeg	Eastern terminus
1.000 mi = 1.609 km; 1.000 km = 0.621 mi

== Related routes ==
=== Provincial Road 392 ===
Provincial Road 392
- Location: Snow Lake
- Length: 33.1 km (20.6 mi)
- Existed: 1966–present

Provincial Road 392 (PR 392) is a 33.1-kilometre-long (20.6 mi) north-south paved spur of PTH 39, serving as the only road access into the town of Snow Lake, as well as Wekusko Falls Provincial Park.

=== Provincial Road 596 ===
Provincial Road 596
- Location: Wekusko
- Length: 5 km (3.1 mi)
- Existed: 1994–present

Provincial Road 596 (PR 596) is a short 5-kilometre-long (3.1 mi) north-south spur of PTH 39 a few kilometres southeast of Snow Lake, connecting the highway to the Canadian National Railway station at Wekusko. It is entirely an unpaved gravel road and includes a bridge over the Metishto River.

PR 596 is designated along a former section of PR 392. It gained its current designation in 1994.
