= Cranberry Portage station =

Railway station in Manitoba, Canada

Cranberry Portage
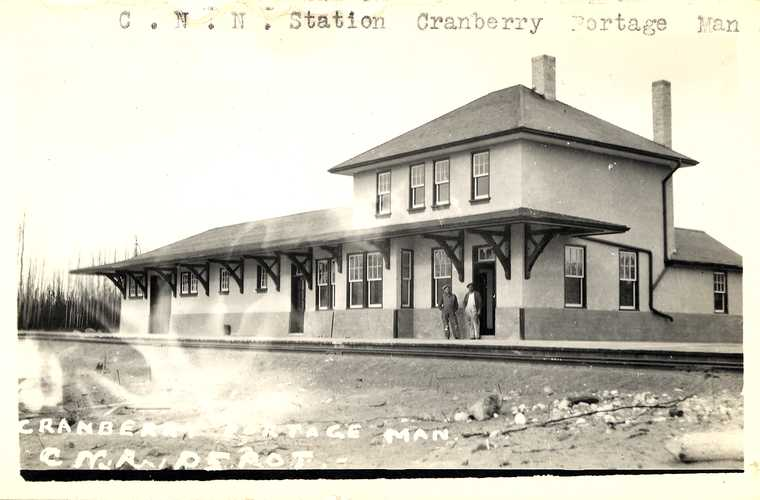

General information
- Location: Railway Avenue, Cranberry Portage, Rural Municipality of Kelsey; Manitoba, Canada
- Coordinates: 54.5858°N 101.3824°W
- Line: "The Pas-Pukatawagan"

Other information
- Status: converted into museum

History
- Opened: 1929

Services
Preceding station	Keewatin Railway	Following station
Optic Lake toward Pukatawagan	The Pas–Pukatawagan	Simonhouse toward The Pas
Former services
Preceding station	Canadian National Railway	Following station
Payuk toward Flin Flon	Hudson Bay Junction – Flin Flon	Simonhouse toward Hudson Bay Junction
Jowsey toward Sherridon	Sherridon – Cranberry Portage	Terminus
Location

Cranberry Portage station is a former railway station in Cranberry Portage, Manitoba, Canada, whose building is now home to the Cranberry Portage Heritage Museum.

Located west of Grass River Provincial Park in north-central Manitoba, the building was constructed in 1929 as a two-storey, third-class station by the Canadian National Railway. The station was later served by Via Rail's "The Pas-Pukatawagan" line for the Keewatin Railway.

== History ==
The Cranberry Portage station building was constructed in 1929 as a two-storey, third-class station by the Canadian National Railway (CNR). This section of the CNR track, known as the Hudson Bay Railway, proved to be essential to the development of northern Manitoba.

The station would later go on to be served by Via Rail, on its "The Pas-Pukatawagan" line for the Keewatin Railway, twice per week in each direction.

In 1992 the railway station was designated a historic site.

The building was unused until 2012, when a local initiative restored the building and converted it into the Cranberry Portage Heritage Museum, which opened officially on May 31, 2015. The building features a post-1915 "third-class" Canadian National Railway design, characterized by a two-storey main block with a hipped roof, a platform-facing bay window, and a long single-storey wing for baggage and freight. Before a highway connection reached the area in 1952, the station served as the primary transport and freight hub for the local community, fur traders, and surrounding mining operations.

== See also ==
- List of designated heritage railway stations of Canada
