= Wanless =

Wanless may refer to:

- Wanless (surname), an English surname
- Wanless, Manitoba, a hamlet in the Rural Municipality of Kelsey, Manitoba, Canada
  - Wanless station
- Wanless, West Virginia, an unincorporated community in Pocahontas County, West Virginia, United States
- Wanless Park, a neighbourhood and park in Toronto, Ontario, Canada

== See also ==
- Wanlessia, a genus of jumping spiders
