= Wekusko Falls Provincial Park =

Provincial park in Manitoba, Canada

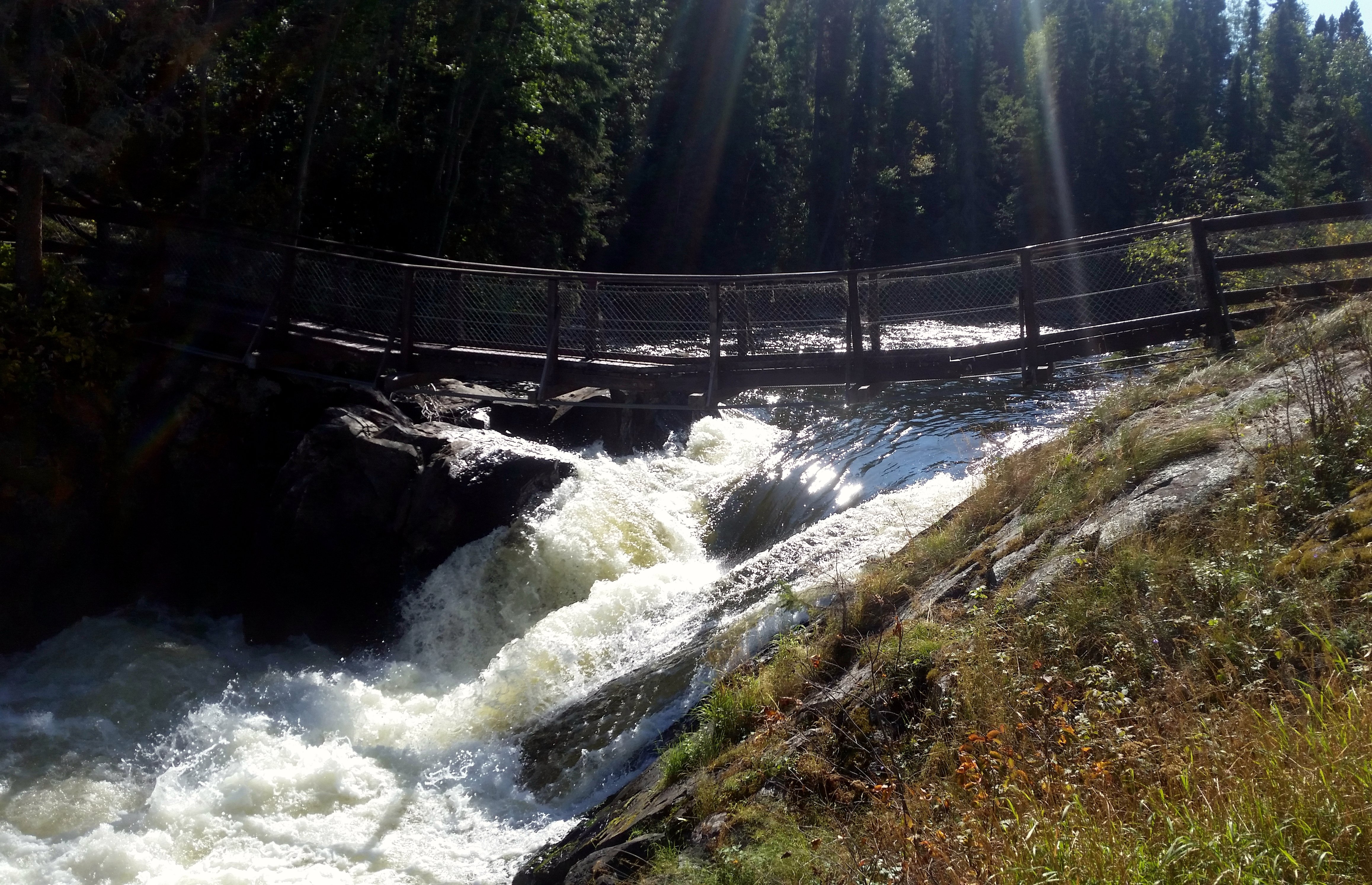

- Location within Manitoba
- Interactive map of Wekusko Falls Provincial Park
- Location: Manitoba, Canada
- Nearest city: Snow Lake, Manitoba
- Coordinates: 54°47′35″N 99°58′19″W
- Area: 88.23 hectares (218.0 acres)
- Established: 1974

Wekusko Falls Provincial Park is a provincial park straddling the Grass River and Wekusko Lake, located in central Manitoba on Manitoba Provincial Road 392 near Snow Lake, Manitoba.

It is also served by the Simonhouse station of the Keewatin Railway.

Preceding station	Keewatin Railway	Following station
Cranberry Portage toward Pukatawagan	The Pas–Pukatawagan	Atik toward The Pas
Former services
Preceding station	Canadian National Railway	Following station
Cranberry Portage toward Flin Flon	Hudson Bay Junction – Flin Flon	Atik toward Hudson Bay Junction

== See also ==
- List of Manitoba parks
- List of Canadian provincial parks
