= Wanless, Manitoba =

Wanless
- Hamlet
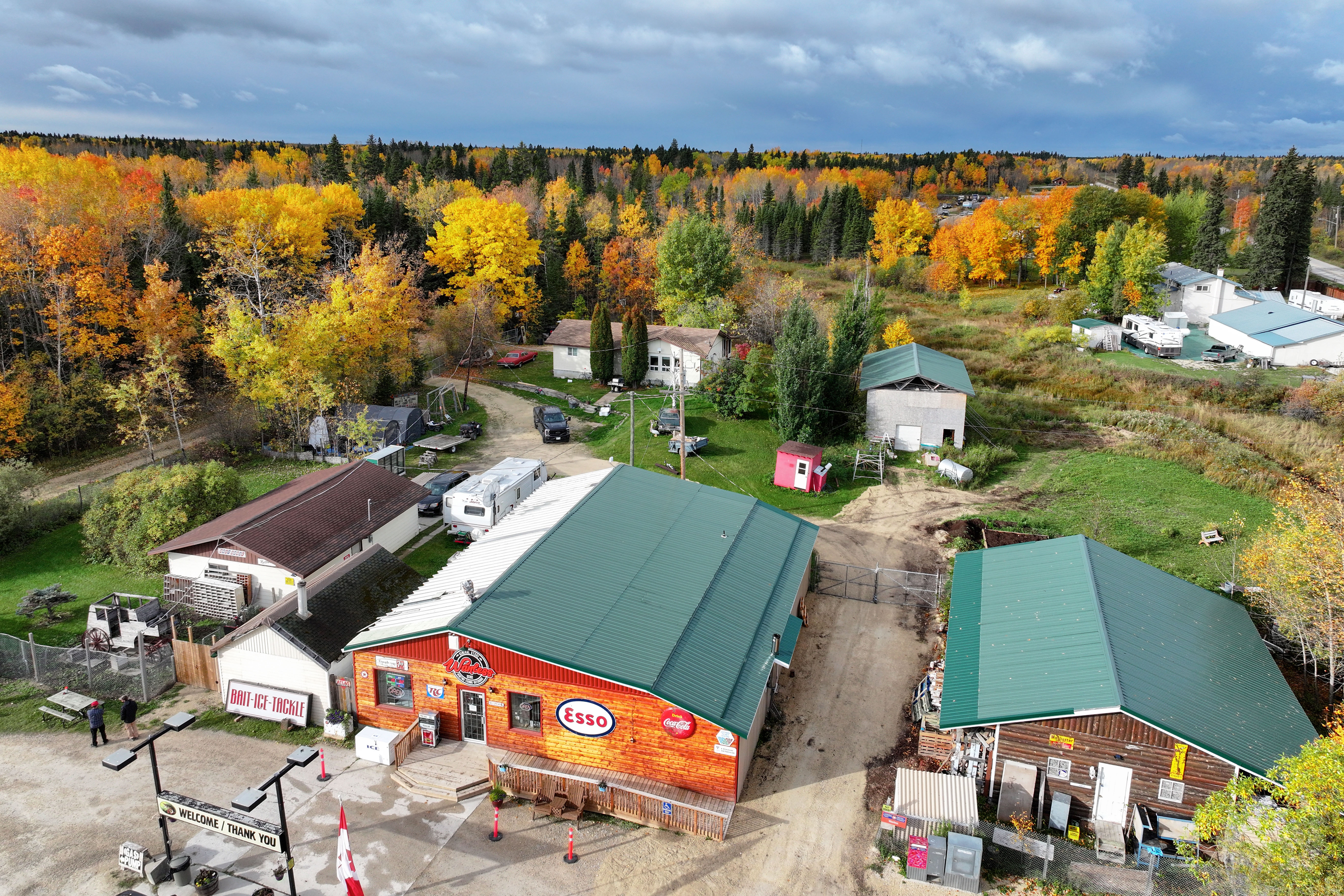
- Wanless (2025)

- Location within Manitoba
- Coordinates: 54°10′42″N 101°21′40″W
- Country: Canada
- Province: Manitoba
- Rural municipality: Rural Municipality of Kelsey

Area (Note: Estimated area of the Wanless enclave)
  - Total: 47.25 km^{2} (18.24 sq mi)

Population
  - Total: 183
  - Density: 3.87/km^{2} (10.0/sq mi)

Wanless is an unincorporated hamlet in the province of Manitoba, Canada. It is located approximately 50 km (31 mi) north of The Pas, close to Rocky Lake, within the Rural Municipality of Kelsey. Wanless had an estimated population of 183 in the mid-2010s. The place was named after homesteader Jack Wanless. Wanless is the only community in the Rural Municipality of Kelsey to be an enclave surrounded by land ungoverned by a municipality, besides Cranberry Portage. Wanless is served by the Manitoba Highway 10.

The town has a community centre, playground, church, and a fire station, provided by the Wanless Community Club, which also hosts some events within the community. Duck hunting is an important part of the tourism of Wanless, and also has a few hunting and fishing lodges. The Jimmy Jackfish Ice Fishing Derby happens in March in the Wanless area.

Preceding station	Keewatin Railway	Following station
Atik toward Pukatawagan	The Pas–Pukatawagan	Root Lake toward The Pas
Former services
Preceding station	Canadian National Railway	Following station
Atik toward Flin Flon	Hudson Bay Junction – Flin Flon	Root Lake toward Hudson Bay Junction
