= Clearwater Lake Provincial Park =

Provincial park in Manitoba, Canada

- IUCN category II (national park)
- Location within Manitoba
- Interactive map of Clearwater Lake Provincial Park
- Location: Manitoba, Canada
- Nearest town: The Pas, Manitoba
- Coordinates: 54°4′59″N 101°4′42″W
- Area: 593 km^{2} (229 sq mi)
- Established: 1963
- Governing body: Government of Manitoba

Clearwater Lake Provincial Park was designated a provincial park by the Government of Manitoba in 1963. The park is 593 square kilometres (229 sq mi) in size, completely surrounding Clearwater Lake. The park is considered to be a Class II protected area under the IUCN protected area management categories.

At Prospector station, it is served by the Keewatin Railway. The park also has access to Manitoba Highway 10 and The Pas Airport via Provincial Road 287 (PR 287).

Preceding station	Keewatin Railway	Following station
Root Lake toward Pukatawagan	The Pas–Pukatawagan	The Pas Terminus
Former services
Preceding station	Canadian National Railway	Following station
Root Lake toward Flin Flon	Hudson Bay Junction – Flin Flon	The Pas toward Hudson Bay Junction

== See also ==
- List of protected areas of Manitoba
