= Pukatawagan Lake =

Lake in Manitoba, Canada

- Location in Manitoba Pukatawagan Lake (Canada)
- Location: Northern Manitoba
- Coordinates: 55.7506°N 101.3217°W
- Etymology: "Fishing with a net"
- Part of: Churchill River drainage basin
- Primary inflows: Churchill River
- Primary outflows: Churchill River
- Basin countries: Canada
- Surface area: 5,101 ha (12,600 acres)
- Surface elevation: 273 m (896 ft)
- Settlements: Pukatawagan

Pukatawagan Lake is a large lake along the course of the Churchill River in Northern Manitoba, Canada. Pukatawagan means "Fishing with a net". The lake is about 210 kilometres (130 mi) north of the town of The Pas. The Pukatawagan Indian reserve of the Mathias Colomb Cree Nation is on a peninsula that juts out into the middle of the lake. Access is from a railway at the eastern end of the lake, an airport at the reserve, and a three-month winter road that approaches from the south.

== Description ==
At 5,101 hectares (12,600 acres), Pukatawagan Lake is a large, irregularly shaped lake in Northern Manitoba near the border with Saskatchewan. The lake is along the course of the Churchill River, which is largely a series of interconnected lakes that begins at Churchill Lake in north-western Saskatchewan and empties into the Hudson Bay at Churchill, Manitoba. Upstream from Pukatawagan Lake is Bonald Lake and downstream is Flatrock Lake. Pukatawagan Lake sits at an elevation of 273 metres (896 ft), but due to the fluctuation of the water volume moving through the Churchill River, this number can vary.

While the Churchill is the primary inflow, other rivers that flow into the lake include Atukaskway River (flows in from the north), Pukatawagan River (flows in from the south), and Little Pukatawagan River (flows in from the south). The Churchill River flows out at the lake's eastern end over the Putatawagan Falls and into Flatrock Lake.

== Lake access ==
There is no year-round road access to Pukatawagan Lake. For most of the year, the only access to the lake is by plane or train. For about three months during the winter, a winter road heads south from Pukatawagan Lake, initially following Pukatawagan River, to Kississing Lake. From there, it transitions to an all-season highway that connects to Highway 10.

The Keewatin Railway runs along the eastern side of the lake. Coming from the south, it crosses the Churchill River at Pukatawagan Falls. On the north side of the river, near the falls, is Pawistik railway point. A short distance north of that is the Pukatawagan railway station. From that station, Wapun Drive heads west to Pukatawagan Airport and the community.

== See also ==
- List of lakes of Manitoba
