= Gillam station =

Railway station in Manitoba, Canada

Gillam

General information
- Location: 252 Railway Avenue; Gillam, MB
- Coordinates: 56.34735°N 94.69968°W
- Line: Winnipeg – Churchill train
- Platforms: 1
- Tracks: 1

Construction
- Structure type: Unstaffed station
- Platform levels: 1
- Parking: outdoor parking available

History
- Opened: 1930

Services
Preceding station	Via Rail	Following station
Kettle Rapids toward Churchill	Winnipeg–Churchill	Luke toward Winnipeg
Former services
Preceding station	Canadian National Railway	Following station
Kettle Rapids toward Churchill	Hudson Bay Railway	Luke toward The Pas
Location

Gillam station is a railway station stop in Gillam, Manitoba, Canada. The stop is served by Via Rail's Winnipeg – Churchill train.

The 1 1/2-storey, wood-frame building was built in 1930 by the Canadian National Railway as a Class II station building. The station building was designated a national heritage railway station in 1992.

== See also ==
- List of designated heritage railway stations of Canada
