= Cormorant Lake (Manitoba) =

Lake in Manitoba, Canada

- Location of the lake in Manitoba Cormorant Lake (Manitoba) (Canada)
- Coordinates: 54°14′N 100°48′W
- Type: natural freshwater lake
- Basin countries: Canada
- Max. length: 64.23 kilometres (39.91 mi)
- Max. width: 21.15 kilometres (13.14 mi)
- Islands: numerous
- Settlements: Cormorant, Manitoba

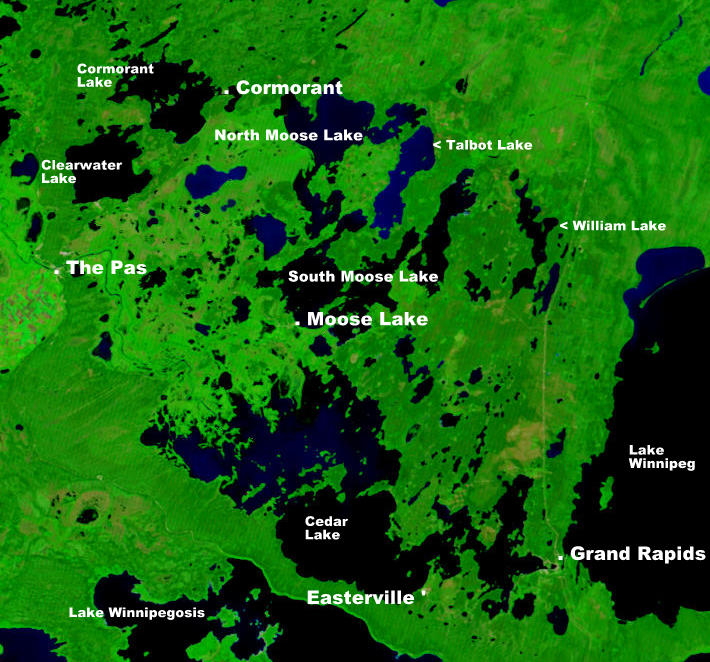
NASA image of Cormorant Lake northeast of The Pas

Cormorant Lake is a large lake in northern Manitoba, Canada. Administratively it is in Division 21, Northern Region of Manitoba, and it lies almost entirely within the Cormorant Provincial Forest. The lake is about 21.15 kilometres (13 mi) wide and 64.23 kilometres (40 mi) long, with a surface area of over 1,000 square kilometres (386 sq mi). The village of Cormorant is on the east side of the lake, along Via Rail's Winnipeg–Churchill line. The Cormorant Lake Airport is between Cormorant and Dering. It is the former site of a now-closed military base. The lake can be reached by road on Provincial Road 287 from just north of The Pas.

Cormorant Lake is in the Saskatchewan River basin and is primarily fed from the northeast from Mitchell Lake and Yawningstone Lake and from the southwest from Clearwater Lake; it exits to the southeast into Moose Lake. There are two large islands in the western portion of the lake and a chain of islands cutting northeast–southwest across the middle of the lake.

== See also ==
- List of lakes of Manitoba
