= McCreary station =

Railway station in Manitoba, Canada

McCreary
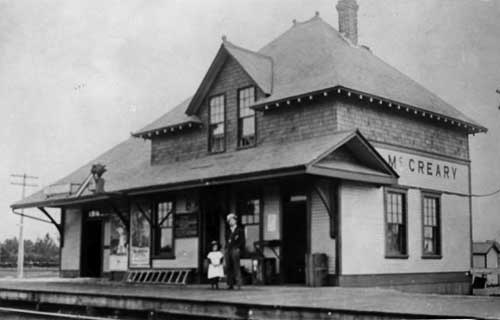
- The station circa 1913

General information
- Location: Railway St. (between 1st & 2nd Avenues), McCreary, Manitoba
- Coordinates: 50.7735°N 99.4897°W
- Line: Winnipeg – Churchill train
- Platforms: 1
- Tracks: 1

Construction
- Structure type: Sign post

History
- Opened: 1912

Services
Preceding station	Via Rail	Following station
Laurier toward Churchill	Winnipeg–Churchill	Glenella toward Winnipeg
Former services
Preceding station	Canadian National Railway	Following station
Laurier toward Calgary	Calgary – Winnipeg	McCreary Junction toward Winnipeg
Laurier toward North Battleford	North Battleford – Winnipeg via Swan River and Hallboro	McCreary Junction toward Winnipeg
Location

The McCreary railway station is a flag stop in McCreary, Manitoba, Canada. The station is served by Via Rail's Winnipeg–Churchill train.

The station building was built in 1912 by the Canadian Northern Railway as a third-class station, to standard plan 100-29, with station functions on the ground floor and living quarters for the station agent above. The station building was designated a heritage railway station of Canada in 1991. The station is now unstaffed, as the building is not used by passengers.

== See also ==
- List of designated heritage railway stations of Canada
