= Manitoba Provincial Road 392 =

Provincial road in Manitoba, Canada

Provincial Road 392
- PTH 30 highlighted in red

Route information
- Maintained by Department of Infrastructure
- Length: 33.187 km (20.621 mi)
- Existed: 1966–present

Major junctions
- South end: PTH 39 in Snow Lake
- PR 393 in Snow Lake; PR 395 in Snow Lake
- North end: Poplar Avenue in Snow Lake

Location
- Country: Canada
- Province: Manitoba
- Towns: Snow Lake

Highway system
- Provincial highways in Manitoba; Winnipeg City Routes
| ← PR 391 | → PR 393 |

Provincial Road 392 (PR 392) is a provincial road in the Canadian province of Manitoba. It runs for 33.187 kilometres (20.621 mi) from an intersection with Highway 39 to an intersection at Poplar Avenue in Snow Lake. The route was first constructed in 1961, along with spurs to Osborne Lake and Chisel Lake. The route was designated in 1966, along with PR 393 and PR 395 running from the Canadian National Railway station at Wekusko to Snow Lake. The route was truncated in 1994 back to Highway 39 and the stretch from Highway 39 to Wekusko station was re-designated as PR 596.

== Route description ==
PR 392 begins at an intersection with Highway 39 in the town of Snow Lake. A two-lane gravel road, PR 392 runs northward past a western tributary of Wekusko Lake. The route winds northward, paralleling the shore of Tramping Lake into a large curve along Wekusko shoreline. During the curve, PR 392 bends northwest and enters Wekusko Falls Provincial Park. The route crosses a tributary of Tramping Lake that drains into Wekusko Lake. The route bends westward past an intersection with two dirt roads before turning northeastward along Wekusko Lake.

Leaving the shores of Wekusko Lake, PR 392 turns northward and into an intersection with the western terminus of PR 393, which connects to Osborne Lake. The route passes west of the community of Stall Lake. The route bends northwestward into an intersection with the eastern end of PR 395, a connection to Chisel Lake. PR 392 crosses a tributary of Snow Lake, and turns westward along the shoreline, entering the centre of the town of Snow Lake. The route intersects with Lakeshore Drive, which connects the southern section of Snow Lake. Paralleling Wekusko Drive, PR 392 turns northwestward and reaches an intersection with Poplar Avenue. Provincial maintenance ends at this intersection, marking the end of PR 392, which continues as Cedar Avenue through Snow Lake.

== History ==
The segments that would later become part of PR 392 was completed as a gravel road from modern-day Highway 39 to the current terminus in Snow Lake. A portion of modern-day Highway 39 was a gravel road, as well as a spur to the Canadian National Railway's station at Wekusko. PR 392 was designated onto the segments from Wekusko station to Snow Lake in 1966, along with spurs that became PR 393 and PR 395. A concurrency was also added with PR 391, which was designated in 1966 as well.

In 1987, the designation of PR 391 was truncated back to Thompson and replaced with Highway 39. The concurrency with PR 392 remained however, connecting Wekusko and Snow Lake. In 1994, the designation of PR 392 was truncated back to Snow Lake and Highway 39 and the stretch to Wekusko station was re-christened as PR 596.

== Major intersections ==
The entire route is in Snow Lake.

| Division | km | mi | Destinations | Notes |
|---|---|---|---|---|
| No. 21 | 0.000 | 0.000 | PTH 39 – Thompson, The Pas | Southern terminus |
| No. 21 | 27.446 | 17.054 | PR 393 (Mill Road) – Stall Lake, Osborne Lake | Western terminus of PR 393; provides access to Snow Lake Airport |
| No. 21 | 29.5 | 18.3 | PR 395 – Chisel Lake | Eastern terminus of PR 395 |
| No. 21 | 33.187 | 20.621 | Poplar Avenue / Cedar Avenue | End of provincial maintenance; northern terminus; road continues north as Cedar Avenue |
1.000 mi = 1.609 km; 1.000 km = 0.621 mi

== Related routes ==
=== Provincial Road 393 ===
Provincial Road 393
- Mill Road
- Location: Snow Lake–Osborne Lake
- Length: 18.621 km (11.571 mi)
- Existed: 1966–present

Provincial Road 393 (PR 393), also known as Mill Road, is a 18.621-kilometre-long (11.571 mi) east-west spur of PR 392 located within the boundaries of the town of Snow Lake, connecting it with the town's airport, Snow Lake Airport, several outlying lakes, as well as a former mine at Osborne Lake. The highway is entirely a two-lane gravel road, with no other major intersections or settlements along its length.

| Division | Location | km | mi | Destinations | Notes |
|---|---|---|---|---|---|
| Town of Snow Lake | | 0.000 | 0.000 | PR 392 to PTH 39 – Snow Lake | Western terminus |
| Town of Snow Lake | | 6.0 | 3.7 | Bridge over Snow Creek | |
| Town of Snow Lake | | 8.5 | 5.3 | Snow Lake Airport | Access road into airport |
| Town of Snow Lake | | 13.9 | 8.6 | Causeway across Wekusko Brook | |
| Town of Snow Lake | | 18.621 | 11.571 | Former Osborne Lake Mine entrance | End of provincial maintenance; eastern terminus; road continues east as an unnamed road towards Morris Lake |
1.000 mi = 1.609 km; 1.000 km = 0.621 mi

=== Provincial Road 395 ===
Provincial Road 395
- Location: Snow Lake
- Length: 13.1 km (8.1 mi)
- Existed: 1966–present

Provincial Road 395 (PR 395) is a 13.1-kilometre-long (8.1 mi) east-west spur of PR 392 within the boundaries of the town of Snow Lake, connecting with both the Chisel Lake Mine and the Lalor Mine. It is entirely a two-lane gravel road, with no other major intersections or settlements to speak of as it travels through mainly remote woodlands.

| Division | Location | km | mi | Destinations | Notes |
|---|---|---|---|---|---|
| Town of Snow Lake | | 0.0 | 0.0 | Chisel Lake Mine entrance | End of provincial maintenance; western terminus |
| Town of Snow Lake | | 3.6 | 2.2 | Lalor Mine | Access road into mine |
| Town of Snow Lake | | 13.1 | 8.1 | PR 392 (Cedar Avenue) to PTH 39 – Snow Lake | Eastern terminus |
1.000 mi = 1.609 km; 1.000 km = 0.621 mi
