= 2011 Missinippi Airways Cessna 208 crash =

Aviation accident in Canada

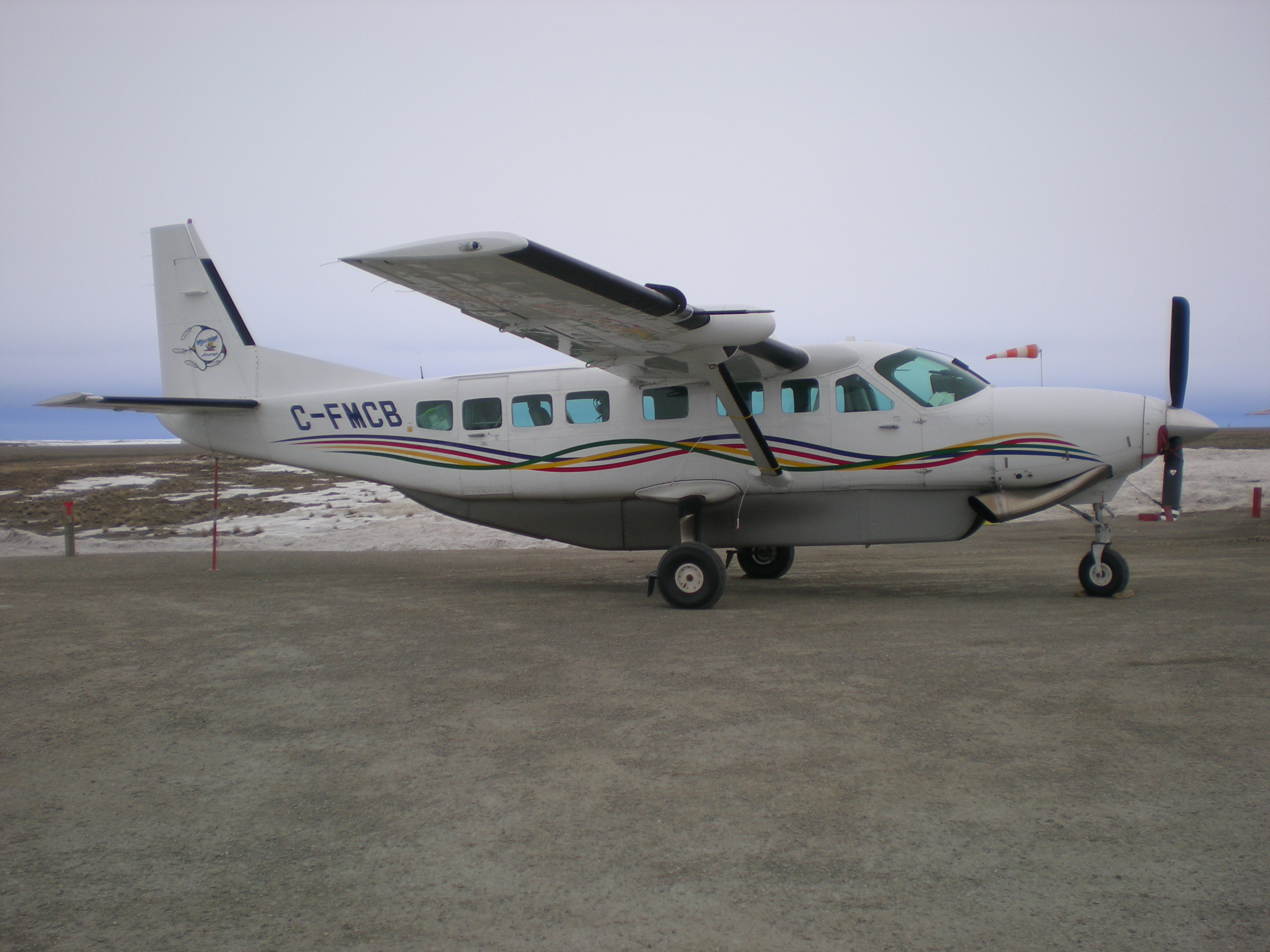
- C-FMCB, the aircraft involved, seen a month before the accident

Accident
- Date: 4 July 2011
- Summary: Runway overrun after rejected takeoff
- Site: Pukatawagan Airport, Manitoba, Canada; 55°44′57″N 101°15′59″W

Aircraft
- Aircraft type: Cessna 208 Caravan
- Operator: Missinippi Airways
- Registration: C-FMCB
- Flight origin: Pukatawagan Airport, Manitoba, Canada
- Destination: The Pas/Grace Lake Airport, Manitoba, Canada
- Occupants: 9
- Passengers: 8
- Crew: 1
- Fatalities: 1
- Injuries: 8
- Survivors: 8

On July 4, 2011, a Missinippi Airways Cessna 208 Caravan passenger aircraft with nine people on board crashed while attempting to take off from Pukatawagan Airport in Manitoba, Canada. One passenger was killed and the other eight occupants were injured.

== History of the flight ==
At around 4PM local time on July 4, the Cessna Caravan was preparing to depart for the return leg of the hour-long daily scheduled flight from The Pas/Grace Lake Airport, Manitoba, to Pukatawagan Airport. On board were a single pilot and eight passengers. After lining up at the start of the 3,000-foot-long (910 m) gravel runway, the pilot applied full power and commenced take-off.

During the take-off run, the aircraft encountered several soft patches on the runway. The pilot realised that the airspeed had stopped increasing, and rejected the take-off with an estimated 600 ft (180 m) of runway remaining. With reverse pitch selected but the engine at idle, the aircraft failed to stop before the end of the runway and rolled down a steep slope, coming to rest in a ravine. The airframe, including the fuel system, was severely damaged by the impact with the up-slope past the ravine, and a post-impact fire ensued almost immediately.

One passenger who was knocked unconscious in the impact could not be extricated from the wreckage and died of smoke inhalation. The pilot and the other seven passengers received minor injuries and were able to return to the terminal building.

== Aircraft ==
The aircraft was a single-engine turboprop Cessna 208B Grand Caravan with registration C-FMCB and manufacturer's serial number 208B-1114. Built in 2005, it was owned by Beaver Air Services and operated by Missinippi Airways.

== Aftermath ==
The investigation led Transport Canada to revoke Missinippi Airways' air operator's certificate, for safety concerns. Without this, it is unable to fly commercial air services in Canada. The air operator's certificate was subsequently reinstated effective September 3, 2011.

On October 21, 2011 at 11:59 pm Transport Canada suspended the Air Operator Certificate again due to deficiencies with the company's Operational Control System after an inspection during the week.

On November 19, 2011 the Air Operator Certificate was again reinstated.

== Investigation ==
An investigation was carried out by the Transportation Safety Board of Canada. The final report was released in June 2012 and found that several factors combined to prevent the aircraft from attaining take-off airspeed, including the soft conditions of the gravel runway following recent rain, the take-off technique adopted by the pilot, which may have caused an increase in the aerodynamic drag, and likely gusty wind conditions.

It was also determined that although the pilot's decision to reject the takeoff was reasonable, it was made at a point from which insufficient runway remained to bring the aircraft to a stop without resulting in a runway excursion. Contributing to the only fatality was that the deceased passenger was not wearing the available shoulder harness, which could have limited the extent of his injuries and the risk of loss of consciousness while the fire was engulfing the wreckage.

As a result of the investigation, Missinippi Airways implemented a new short-field take-off procedure and committed to put greater emphasis on short/soft field take-off and landing training.
