= Moose Lake, Manitoba =

Moose Lake
- Unincorporated community
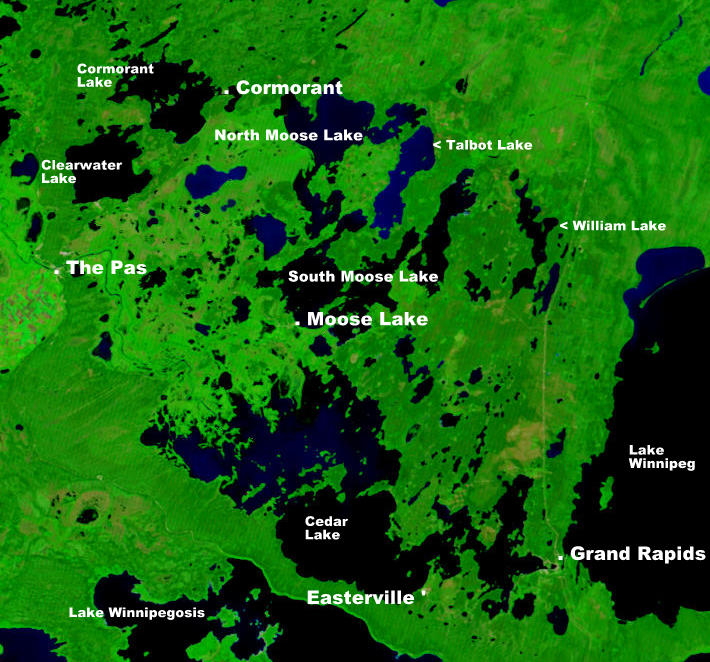
- NASA image showing the location of Moose Lake

- Community boundaries

- Location within Manitoba
- Coordinates: 53°42′16″N 100°18′37″W
- Country: Canada
- Province: Manitoba
- Census division: 21
- Region: Northern Region

Area
  - Total: 9.75 km^{2} (3.76 sq mi)
- Elevation: 260 m (840 ft)

Population (2021)
  - Total: 232
  - Density: 23.8/km^{2} (62/sq mi)
- Time zone: UTC−5 (CST)
  - Summer (DST): UTC−6 (CDT)

Moose Lake is a small community in Manitoba, Canada. It is located on the eastern edge of the Saskatchewan River Delta on the western shore of South Moose Lake about 74 kilometres (46 mi) southeast of The Pas. Adjacent to the non-treaty community are the First Nations reserves Moose Lake 31A and 31D, home to the Mosakahiken Cree Nation.

== History ==
The North West Company (NWC) established a fur trade post on the lake, which became the Hudson's Bay Company's (HBC) when these two companies merged in 1821. Four years later, the post was abandoned, but in 1829 the Moose Lake Post was reestablished, complete with a horse-breeding centre. The post operated an outpost on Cedar Lake from 1886 on. In 1893, the roles reversed and Cedar Lake became a full fur trade post with Moose Lake serving as its outpost. The post closed circa 1912.

In 1900, Thomas Henry Peacock Lamb (also known as THP Lamb or Ten Horse-Power Lamb), an Englishman from Yorkshire, built a trading post on the western shore of Moose Lake called Lamb's Store, but most people referred to it as "The Post" and predated the current community of Moose Lake by several years.

THP's son Tom Lamb (who later started Lamb Air, a Cattle Ranch (7-L), a Muskrat Ranch, commercial fishing and construction) bought The Post from his father and operated it for years. Eventually, Tom's son-in-law Jock McAree and daughter Carol (Lamb) bought The Post from Tom Lamb. Jock ran the store for several years with the assistance of his wife and children. Later his son Greg McAree took over, they added a video games room and expanded with a laundromat. The North West Company eventually bought The Post from Jock and Carol and is operating today as a Northern Store.

== Demographics ==
In the 2021 Census of Population conducted by Statistics Canada, Moose Lake had a population of 232 living in 53 of its 65 total private dwellings, a change of 16% from its 2016 population of 200. With a land area of 9.75 km^{2} (3.76 sq mi), it had a population density of 23.8/km^{2} (61.6/sq mi) in 2021.

Canada census – Moose Lake, Manitoba community profile

	2021	2016
Population	232 (+16.0% from 2016)	200 (+78.6% from 2011)
Land area	9.75 km^{2} (3.76 sq mi)	9.75 km^{2} (3.76 sq mi)
Population density	23.8/km^{2} (62/sq mi)	20.5/km^{2} (53/sq mi)
Median age	22.4 (M: 20.4, F: 24.6)	19.8 (M: 19.8, F: 19.8)
Private dwellings	65 (total) 53 (occupied)	80 (total) 54 (occupied)
Median household income	$ N/A	$47,488

Notes: 2016 and 2021 data based on population and dwelling count amendments.
References: 2021 2016

Historical census populations – Moose Lake, Manitoba
Year	Pop.	±%
2006	76	—
2011	112	+47.4%
2016	200	+78.6%
2021	232	+16.0%
2011, 2016, and 2021 Population figures based on revised counts. Population counts are not adjusted for boundary changes. Source: Statistics Canada

== Access ==
Moose Lake is accessed from The Pas (which is 103 km by road) by going north on PTH 10, east on PR 287 then south (from Clearwater Lake) on PR 384.

The town formerly had an airport, Moose Lake Airport, known by the IATA code YAD.
