= Irvin Head =

Cree sculptor from Manitoba (1956–2022)

Irvin Robert Head
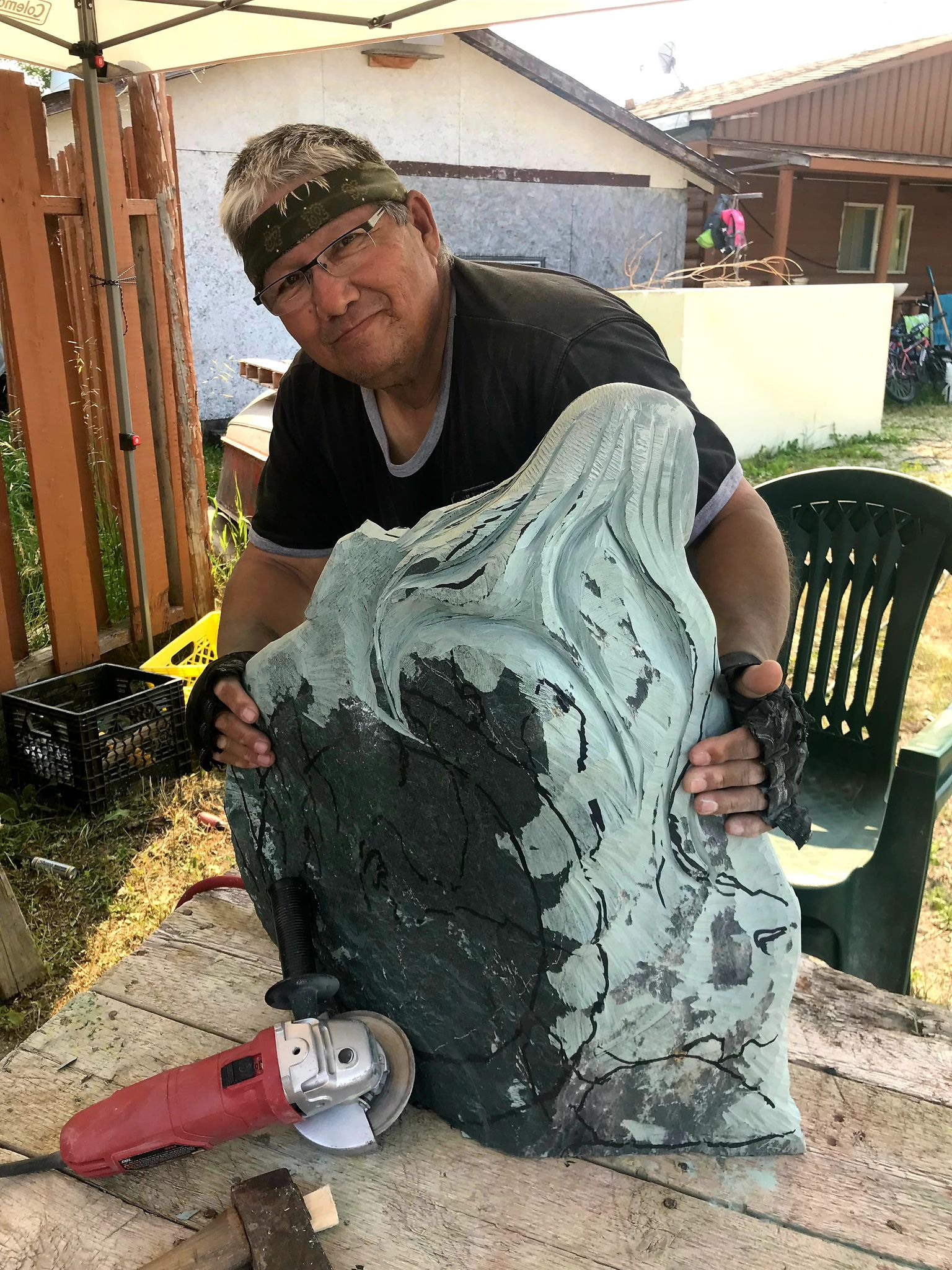
- Born: March 12, 1956; Manitoba
- Died: August 15, 2022 (aged 66); Cranberry Portage, Manitoba
- Known for: Sculpture
- Movement: Indigenous, Cree
- Website: https://www.irvinhead.ca/

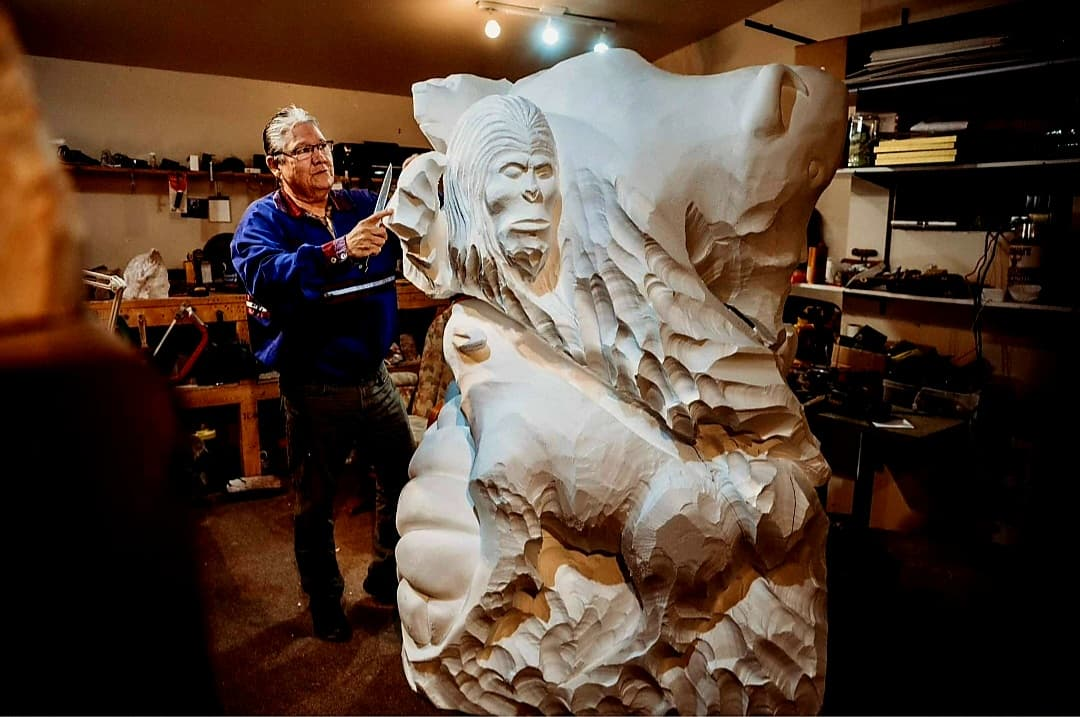
Irvin Head, sculpting in his workshop in Cranberry Portage, Manitoba.

Irvin "Muskie" Robert Head (March 12, 1956–August 15, 2022) was a Cree and Métis sculptor from Cranberry Portage, Manitoba.

Self-taught, he started carving in the late 1990s using hand tools and worked with a variety of materials including wood, granite, marble, antler and soapstone.

His work has been featured internationally, including at the 2010 Vancouver Winter Olympics. As lead artist, he oversaw the creation of “Grand Entry” — nine ravens in a circle, placed at the entrance of the Olympic Curling venue.

His final piece, the Every Child Matters memorial art project was unveiled at the Ma Mawi Wi Chi Itata Centre in Winnipeg, Manitoba on September 30, 2022.
