= Clearwater Lake (Manitoba) =

Lake in Manitoba, Canada

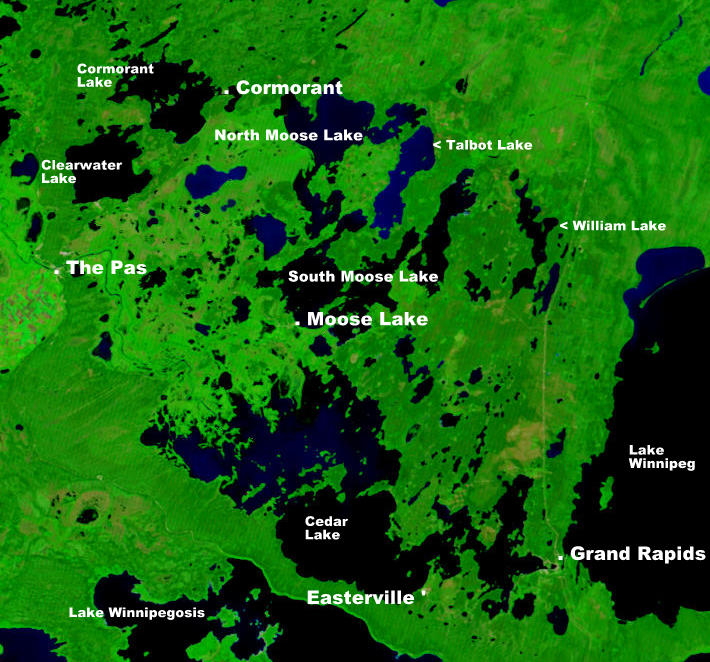
- NASA image of Clearwater Lake northeast of The Pas

- Location of the lake in Manitoba Clearwater Lake (Canada)
- Location: Division No. 21, near The Pas, Manitoba, Canada
- Coordinates: 54°3′N 101°3′W
- Basin countries: Canada
- Max. length: 16 km (9.9 mi)
- Max. width: 16 km (9.9 mi)
- Surface elevation: 259 m (850 ft)

Clearwater Lake is a lake in Manitoba, Canada. It is the main geographical feature of Manitoba's Clearwater Lake Provincial Park, located northeast of The Pas in western Manitoba.

== See also ==
- List of lakes of Manitoba
