= Moose Lake (Manitoba) =

Lake in Manitoba, Canada

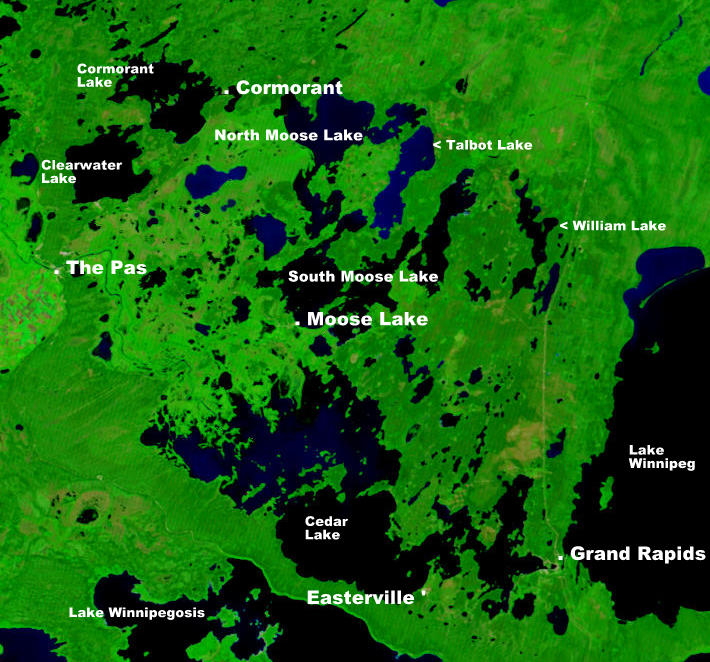
- NASA image showing North and South Moose Lake

- Location in Manitoba Moose Lake (Canada)
- Location: Manitoba
- Coordinates: 53.94°N 100.15°W
- Primary outflows: Moose Creek
- Basin countries: Canada
- Surface area: 1,367 km^{2} (528 sq mi)
- Surface elevation: 255 m (837 ft)
- Settlements: Moose Lake

Moose Lake is a lake located near the Saskatchewan River Delta in Manitoba, Canada. It is separated into two irregularly shaped lobes, North Moose Lake and South Moose Lake, by the Moose Lake Narrows Control Structure, which was built in 1964. South Moose Lake drains south into Cedar Lake via Moose Creek; these two lakes form the reservoir of the Grand Rapids Generating Station, and the sluice gates at Moose Lake Narrows helps regulate their water levels. The lake as a whole lies at an elevation of 255 metres (837 ft) and covers 1,367 square kilometres (528 sq mi). The community of Moose Lake is on the south shore of the lake.

== Human activity ==
A portage between the eastern end of South Moose Lake and the source of the Minago River was used by fur traders to travel between the Saskatchewan and Nelson Rivers. Most if not all of the semi-nomadic Cree who originally frequented the area around Moose Lake died in a smallpox epidemic during the winter of 1781–1782. The area was subsequently settled by Swampy Cree migrating from the east. In 1876, Chief Otinikimaw (also known as Otinekimow or George Beaver) of the Moose Lake band signed Treaty Five, making the lands around Moose Lake and Cedar Lake subject to its terms.

Today, logging, fishing, and trapping are practiced in the Moose Lake area. Tom Lamb operated a cattle ranch at Moose Lake from 1953 to 1964, when flooding of the area by the Grand Rapids hydroelectric project forced its closure. The building of the Grand Rapids Dam caused the inundation of 66% of the territory held by the Moose Lake Cree, with correspondingly and predictably disastrous consequences for the community: previously important economic activities such as moose hunting were eliminated, and substance abuse among children, crime, and alcoholism had become rampant by the late 1970s. A settlement for damages caused by the Grand Rapids project was signed by the Mosakahiken Cree Nation and the province of Manitoba in 2008.

== See also ==
- List of lakes of Manitoba
