= Wanless, West Virginia =

- Unincorporated community
- Location within West Virginia Location within the United States
- Coordinates: 38°26′14″N 79°54′25″W
- Country: United States
- State: West Virginia
- County: Pocahontas
- Elevation: 3,012 ft (918 m)
- Time zone: UTC-5 (Eastern (EST))
  - Summer (DST): UTC-4 (EDT)
- Area codes: 304 & 681
- GNIS feature ID: 1553371

Wanless is an unincorporated community in Pocahontas County, West Virginia, United States. Wanless is 9 miles (14 km) south-southwest of Durbin.
