= Pukatawagan Airport =

Airport in Manitoba, Canada

- IATA: XPK; ICAO: CZFG

Summary
- Airport type: Public
- Operator: Government of Manitoba
- Location: Pukatawagan, Manitoba
- Time zone: CST (UTC−06:00)
  - Summer (DST): CDT (UTC−05:00)
- Elevation AMSL: 960 ft (290 m)
- Coordinates: 55°44′57″N 101°15′59″W

Map
- Location in Manitoba CZFG (Canada)

Runways
| Direction | Length | | Surface |
| Direction | ft | m | Surface |
|---|---|---|---|
| 15/33 | 2,998 | 914 | Crushed rock |

Statistics (2010)
- Aircraft movements: 1,772
- Source: Canada Flight Supplement; Movements from Statistics Canada

Pukatawagan Airport (IATA: XPK, ICAO: CZFG) is a public airport located 2.5 nautical miles (4.6 km; 2.9 mi) east of Pukatawagan, Manitoba, Canada.

== Airlines and destinations ==
In addition to offering a daily service to The Pas/Grace Lake Airport (CJR3), Missinippi Airways offers charters and Medivac flights.

| Airlines | Destinations |
|---|---|
| Missinippi Airways | The Pas/Grace Lake |

== Accidents ==
On July 4, 2011 a Missinippi Airways Cessna 208 Caravan crashed after overrunning the runway following a late rejected take-off. The aircraft, carrying a pilot and eight passengers, rolled down the steep slope past the end of runway 33 and crashed into a ravine, catching fire. One passenger was killed.

== See also ==
- List of airports in Manitoba
- Pukatawagen Water Aerodrome
