= Cormorant, Manitoba =

Cormorant
- Location of Cormorant in Manitoba
- Coordinates: 54°13′26″N 100°36′1″W
- Country: Canada
- Province: Manitoba
- Region: Northern Region
- Census Division: No. 21

Government
  - Mayor: Edie Turner
  - Governing Body: Cormorant Community Council
  - MP: Rebecca Chartrand
  - MLA: Vacant
- Time zone: UTC−6 (CST)
  - Summer (DST): UTC−5 (CDT)
- Postal Code: R0B 0G0
- Area code: 204
- NTS Map: 063K02
- GNBC Code: GAFMY

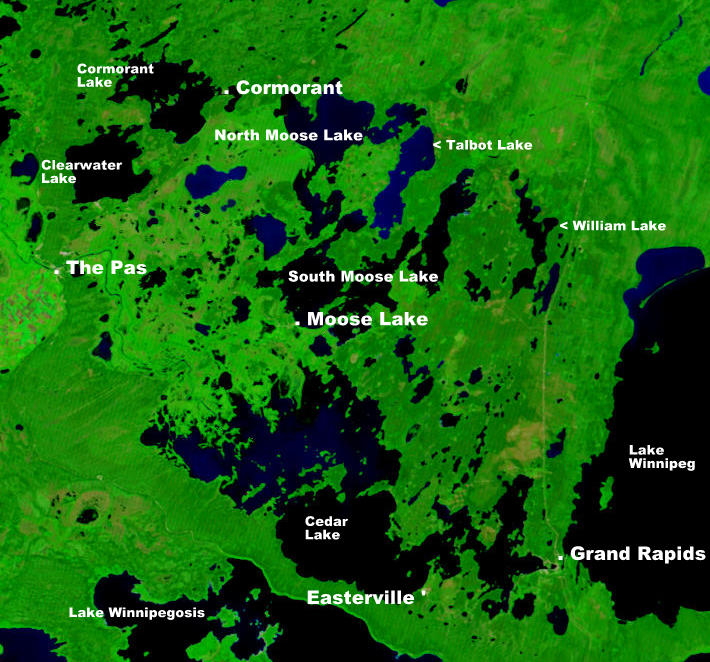
NASA image of Cormorant Lake northeast of The Pas

Cormorant is an unincorporated community in the Canadian province of Manitoba on the east shore of Cormorant Lake about 80 kilometres from The Pas. The community is in the NorMan Region of the province. It has been an Aboriginal and First Nations campsite dating back to the 1900s. The post office in the community was established in July, 1928.

As of 2001, the community had a population of 400 in 139 households. Community services include local water supply, waste disposal, Cormorant School, Community hall, and Cormorant Lodge.

It is governed by a mayor and council.

Fishing, trapping and logging are the primary industries.

Cormorant is served by Via Rail's Winnipeg–Churchill rail line at the Cormorant railway station.

== Demographics ==
In the 2021 Census of Population conducted by Statistics Canada, Cormorant had a population of 307 living in 104 of its 123 total private dwellings, a change of −6.1% from its 2016 population of 327. With a land area of 18.37 km^{2} (7.09 sq mi), it had a population density of 16.7/km^{2} (43.3/sq mi) in 2021.

Canada census – Cormorant, Manitoba community profile

	2011
Population	346 (3.6% from 2006)
Land area	13.79 km^{2} (5.32 sq mi)
Population density	25.1/km^{2} (65/sq mi)
Median age	26.8 (M: 23.8, F: 27.9)
Private dwellings	111 (total)
Median household income

References: 2011
