= The Pas/Grace Lake Airport =

Airport in Manitoba, Canada

- IATA: none; ICAO: none; TC LID: CJR3

Summary
- Airport type: Public
- Operator: Beaver Air Services
- Location: The Pas, Manitoba
- Time zone: CST (UTC−06:00)
  - Summer (DST): CDT (UTC−05:00)
- Elevation AMSL: 873 ft (266 m)
- Coordinates: 53°49′35″N 101°12′19″W

Map
- Location in Manitoba CJR3 (Canada)

Runways
Direction	Length		Surface
Direction	ft	m	Surface
08/26	3,265	995	Gravel
17/35	2,853	870	Gravel
- Source: Canada Flight Supplement

The Pas/Grace Lake Airport (TC LID: CJR3) is an airport adjacent to The Pas, Manitoba, Canada.

== Airlines ==
Missinippi Airways provides a daily schedule to Pukatawagan Airport (CZFG), as well as 24-hour Medivac and charter services.

Airlines	Destinations
Missinippi Airways	Pukatawagan

== See also ==
- List of airports in Manitoba
- The Pas Airport
- The Pas/Grace Lake Water Aerodrome
