= Wanless (surname) =

Wanless is a surname of Scottish and Northeast English origin, derived from the Middle English and Older Scots word "wanles" meaning "luckless", "hopeless", "despairing".

Notable people with this surname include:

- Betty Wanless (1928–1995), American baseball player
- Derek Wanless (1947–2012), English banker
- Elizabeth Wanless (born 1981), American shot putter
- Harold R. "Hal" Wanless (born 1942) American geographer and environmentalist
- Ian Wanless (born 1969), Australian mathematician
- Neville Wanless (1931–2020), English broadcaster
- Paul Wanless (born 1973), English footballer
- Peter Wanless (born 1964), English civil servant
- Robert Wanless O'Gowan (1864–1947), British army officer
- Sarah Wanless, English ornithologist
- William James Wanless (1865–1933), Canadian medical missionary to India
