= Snow Lake, Manitoba =

Town in Manitoba, Canada

Snow Lake
- Town
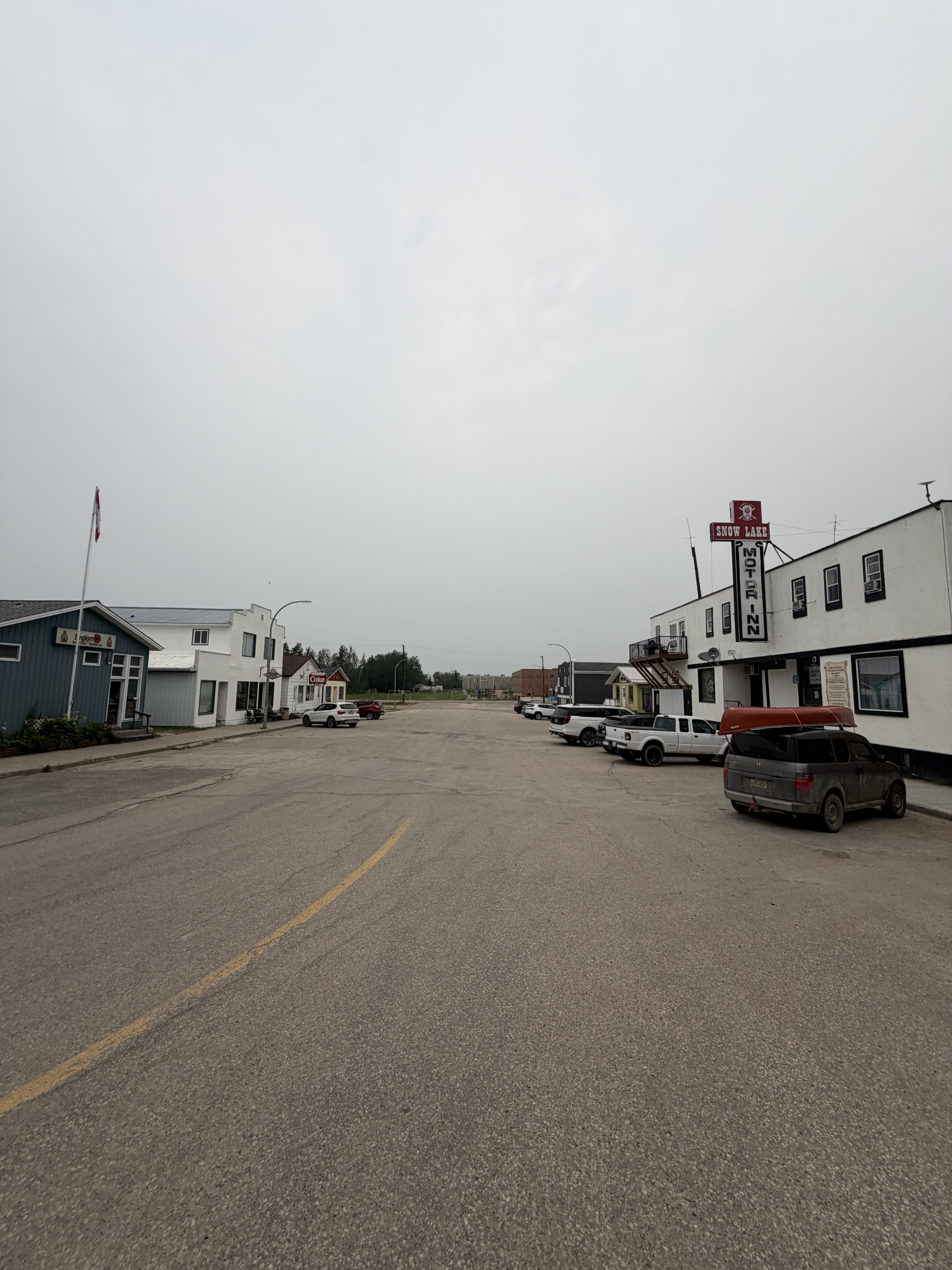
- Downtown Snow Lake

- Location within Manitoba
- Coordinates: 54°52′53.05″N 100°1′21.68″W
- Country: Canada
- Province: Manitoba
- Region: Northern
- Founded: 1947
- Incorporated: 1976

Government
  - Mayor: Ron Scott
  - MLA: Tom Lindsey
- Elevation: 271 m (889 ft)

Population (2021)
  - Total: 1,088
- Time zone: UTC-6 (Central (CST))
  - Summer (DST): UTC-5 (Central (CDT))
- Postal code: R0B 1M0
- Area code: 204
- Website: Town of Snow Lake

Snow Lake is a town in Manitoba, Canada, located 685 km (426 mi) north of Winnipeg at the end of Provincial Road 392. The main industry is, and always has been, mining; currently with one mine producing Zinc, and another lithium. The official Town of Snow Lake is a very large, overwhelmingly rural area that is centered about the urban community of Snow Lake, which lies very near its geographical center. The Town is as large in area as a typical rural municipality in the more southern parts of Manitoba.

Possibly named for a local family (Rudnyckyj) or because early settlers "found the water in the lake as soft as the melted snow" (Files, Manitoba Department of Natural Resources).

== Mining ==
Mining has been Snow Lake's major industry since incorporation. Two separate mining ventures have operated in the community over the past 40 years. TVX/Kinross/High River operated the New Britannia Mine, which closed in January 2005, and HudBay Minerals, which operated 12 area mines. They were/are Lalor Mine, Chisel Lake, Stall Lake, Osborne Lake, Dickstone, Anderson Lake, Ghost Lake, Lost Lake, Spruce Point, Rod Mine, Photo Lake, and Chisel North.

Following a rise in demand, lithium has begun to attract mining companies to the area. Nasdaq listed Snow Lake Lithium ($LITM) are currently (at Jan 2022) preparing to start commercial lithium mining.

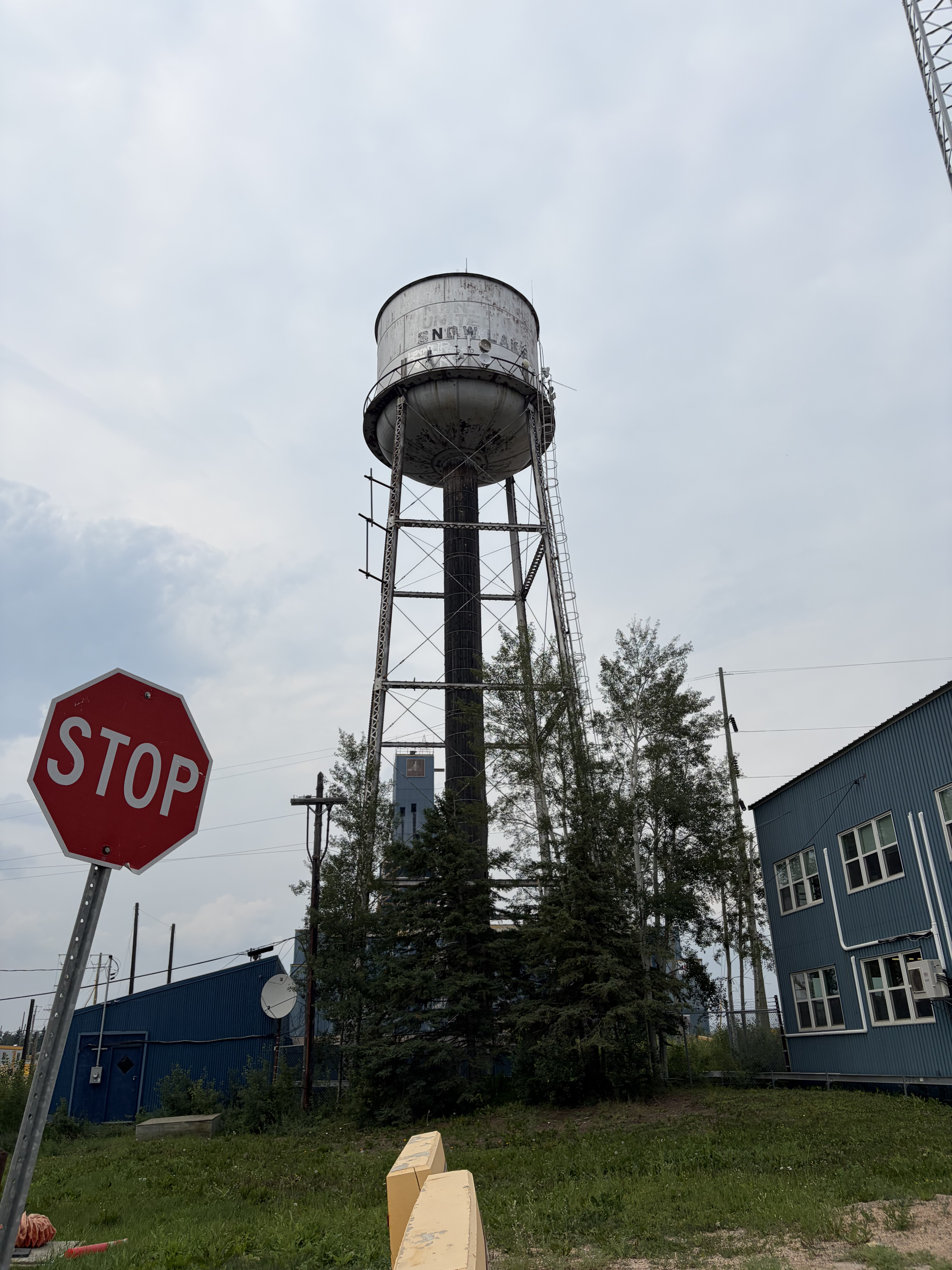
Water tower in Snow Lake

== Demographics ==
In the 2021 Census of Population conducted by Statistics Canada, Snow Lake had a population of 1,088 living in 473 of its 604 total private dwellings, a change of 21% from its 2016 population of 899. With a land area of 1,166.64 km^{2} (450.44 sq mi), it had a population density of 0.9/km^{2} (2.4/sq mi) in 2021.

Canada census – Snow Lake community profile

	2016	2011
Population	899 (24.3% from 2011)	723 (-13.6% from 2006)
Land area	1,211.89 km^{2} (467.91 sq mi)	1,211.89 km^{2} (467.91 sq mi)
Population density	0.7/km^{2} (1.8/sq mi)	0.6/km^{2} (1.6/sq mi)
Median age	47.4 (M: 48.2, F: 44.2)	48.4 (M: 49.0, F: 48.3)
Private dwellings	498 (total)	526 (total)
Median household income	$44,480

References: 2016 2011

== Education ==
Joseph H. Kerr School, the lone educational facility in Snow Lake, is a Kindergarten to Senior Four facility with an enrollment of 145 students for the 2008–2009 school year. It is now part of the Frontier School Division. Prior to a Provincial amalgamation (2003) of school districts, it operated under its own district, the School District of Snow Lake # 2309. The building, under one form or another, has been open for close to fifty years. In 2001, Joseph H. Kerr was named one of the thirty most innovative schools by Canada's Schoolnet.

== Local media and services ==
=== Radio ===
- NCI - 96.3
- CBC - 95.5

=== Television ===
CBWKT connected to the province-wide microwave system on March 1, 1969.

- Shaw Cable Television;
- CBWKT channel 8 (CBC);
- CKYS-TV channel 11 (CTV).
