= Churchill station (Manitoba) =

Railway station in Manitoba, Canada

Churchill
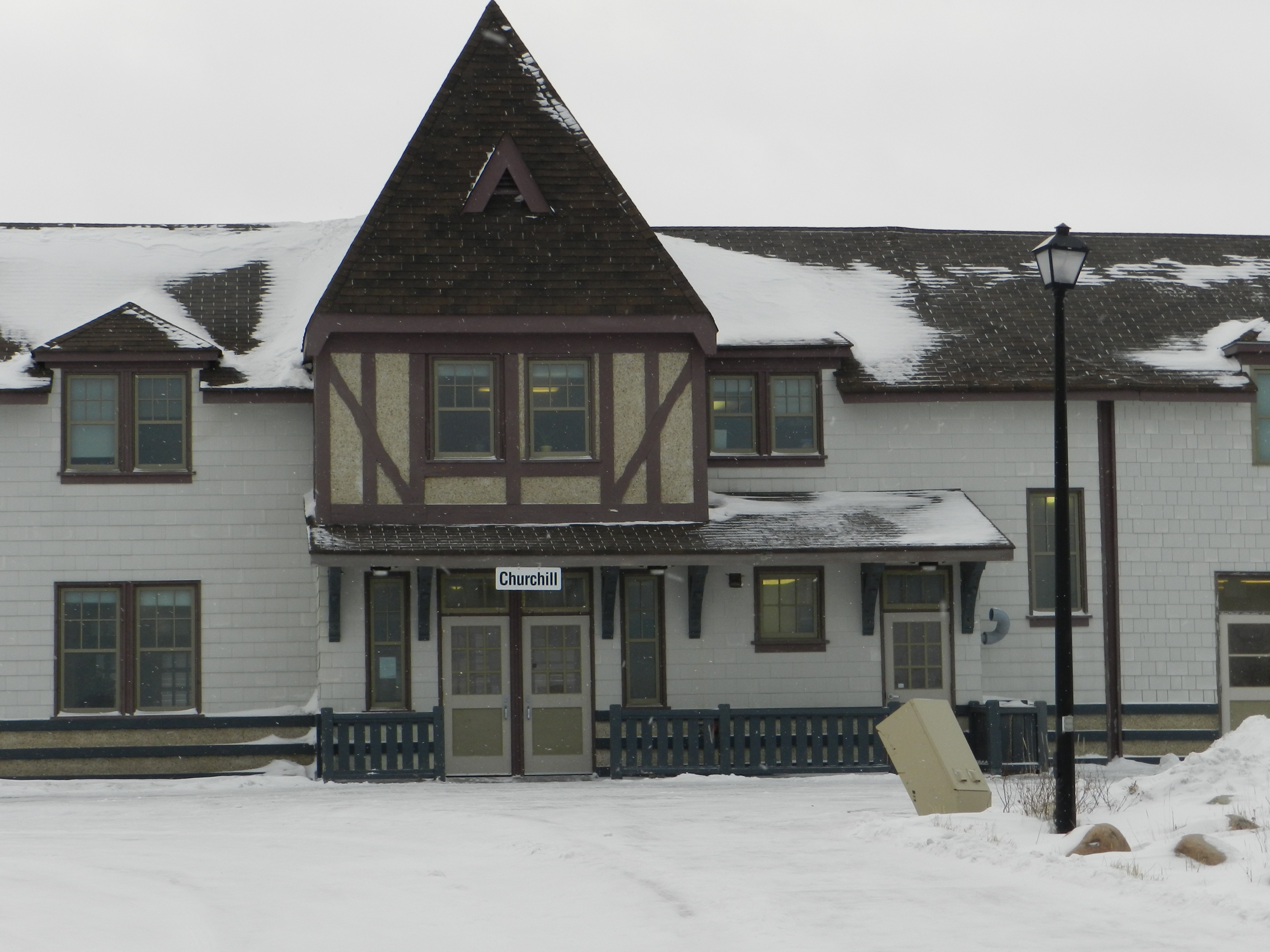

General information
- Location: Kelsey Boulevard; Churchill, Manitoba; Canada
- Coordinates: 58°46′04″N 94°10′28″W
- Owner: Via Rail
- Line: Winnipeg – Churchill train

Construction
- Structure type: 2 storey heritage station building
- Parking: Outdoor parking (short & long term)
- Accessible: Yes
- Architectural style: Queen Anne Revival, Arts and Crafts

Other information
- Status: Staffed station
- IATA code: XAD
- Website: Churchill train station

History
- Opened: 1929; 97 years ago

Services
Preceding station	Via Rail	Following station
Terminus	Winnipeg–Churchill	Tidal toward Winnipeg
Former services
Preceding station	Canadian National Railway	Following station
Terminus	Hudson Bay Railway	Tidal toward The Pas

Heritage Railway Station (Canada)
- Official name: VIA Rail/Canadian National Railways Station
- Designated: 1992
Location
- Location within Manitoba Location within Canada

Churchill station is a railway station in Churchill, Manitoba, Canada. It is served by passenger service Via Rail as well as the Hudson Bay Railway freight carrier. The station is located 820 kilometres (510 mi) northeast from The Pas, Manitoba, on the shore of Hudson Bay. It also has Parks Canada exhibits inside.

The railway to Churchill was originally built by the Canadian National and completed in 1929. The building contains elements of the Queen Anne Revival and the Arts and Crafts styles. The Churchill railway station has been a national heritage railway station since 1992, and has been restored to its former design by the federal government.

The Canadian Government has also recognized the station as a "Recognized Federal Heritage Building" since June 2000. The station building now includes a museum as well as telephones, washrooms and a ticket office which is open one hour prior to departure of the train.

== Service interruption ==
Following extensive flood damage to the Hudson Bay Railway in May 2017, no passenger trains ran to Churchill until December 2018.

== See also ==
- Churchill Airport (IATA: YYQ, ICAO: CYYQ)
- Port of Churchill
- List of designated heritage railway stations of Canada
