= Winnipeg–Churchill train =

Via Rail service in Manitoba, Canada

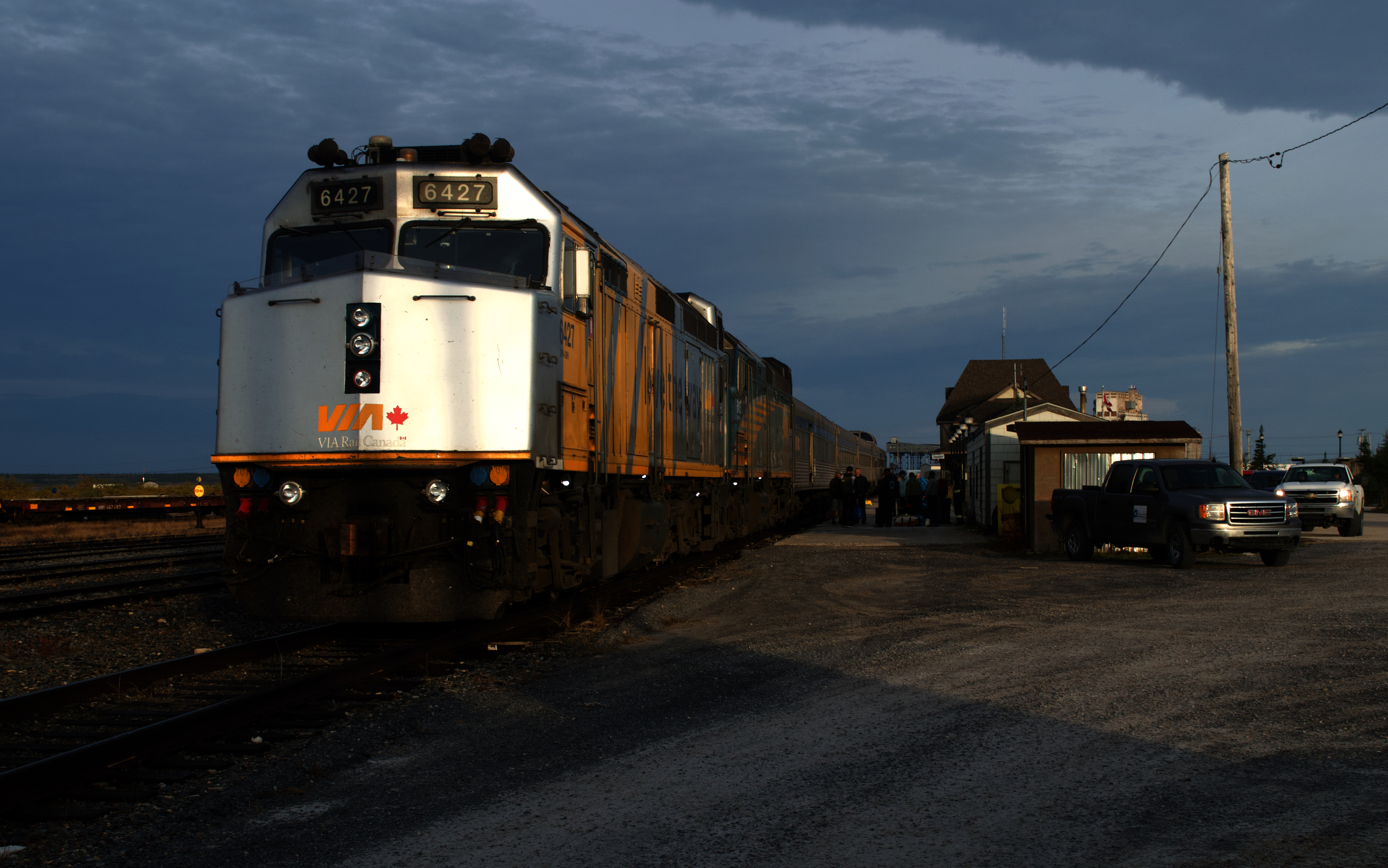
- The Winnipeg–Churchill train at Churchill in 2024

Overview
- Service type: Inter-city rail
- Status: Operating
- Locale: Manitoba, Canada
- Current operator: Via Rail
- Former operator: Canadian National Railway
- Ridership: 500 weekly (FY 2025)
- Annual ridership: 25,989 (FY 2025)
- Website: Winnipeg - Churchill

Route
- Termini: Winnipeg, Manitoba; The Pas, Manitoba; Churchill, Manitoba
- Distance travelled: 1,710 km (1,063 mi)
- Average journey time: 44 h 55 m to Churchill, 45 h 15 m to Winnipeg
- Service frequency: 2 trains per week (entire route), 3 trains per week (The Pas-Churchill)
- Train numbers: 693, 691 (northbound); 692, 690 (southbound)

On-board services
- Classes: Economy and sleeper class
- Seating arrangements: Coach seat
- Sleeping arrangements: Sleepers (offering some "open sections")
- Catering facilities: Dining car

Technical
- Rolling stock: F40PH locomotives; Skyline series
- Track gauge: 1,435 mm (4 ft 8 1/2 in)
- Operating speed: 80 mph (128 km/h)
- Track owners: CN, HBRY, KRC

The Winnipeg–Churchill train (formerly known as the Hudson Bay and, before that, Northern Spirits) is a twice weekly passenger train operated by Via Rail Canada between Winnipeg and Churchill, Manitoba. It is the only dry-land connection between Churchill and the rest of Canada.

The service, which runs through Manitoba and Saskatchewan, travels on the Canadian National Railway line north to The Pas, where it transfers to the Hudson Bay Railway, passing through Wabowden, Manitoba, with a spur from Sipiwesk to Thompson, and Gillam on its way to the Port of Churchill on Hudson Bay.

== Schedule ==
The northbound train leaves Winnipeg at 12:05 on Tuesdays and Sundays and is scheduled to arrive in Churchill two days later at 09:00. The southbound service departs Churchill at 19:30 on Thursday and Saturday evenings and reaches Winnipeg at 16:45 two days later. An additional weekly service operates in each direction between The Pas (departure at 02:30 on Fridays) and Churchill (departure at 19:30 on Tuesdays). The trip takes approximately 45 hours each way.

== History ==
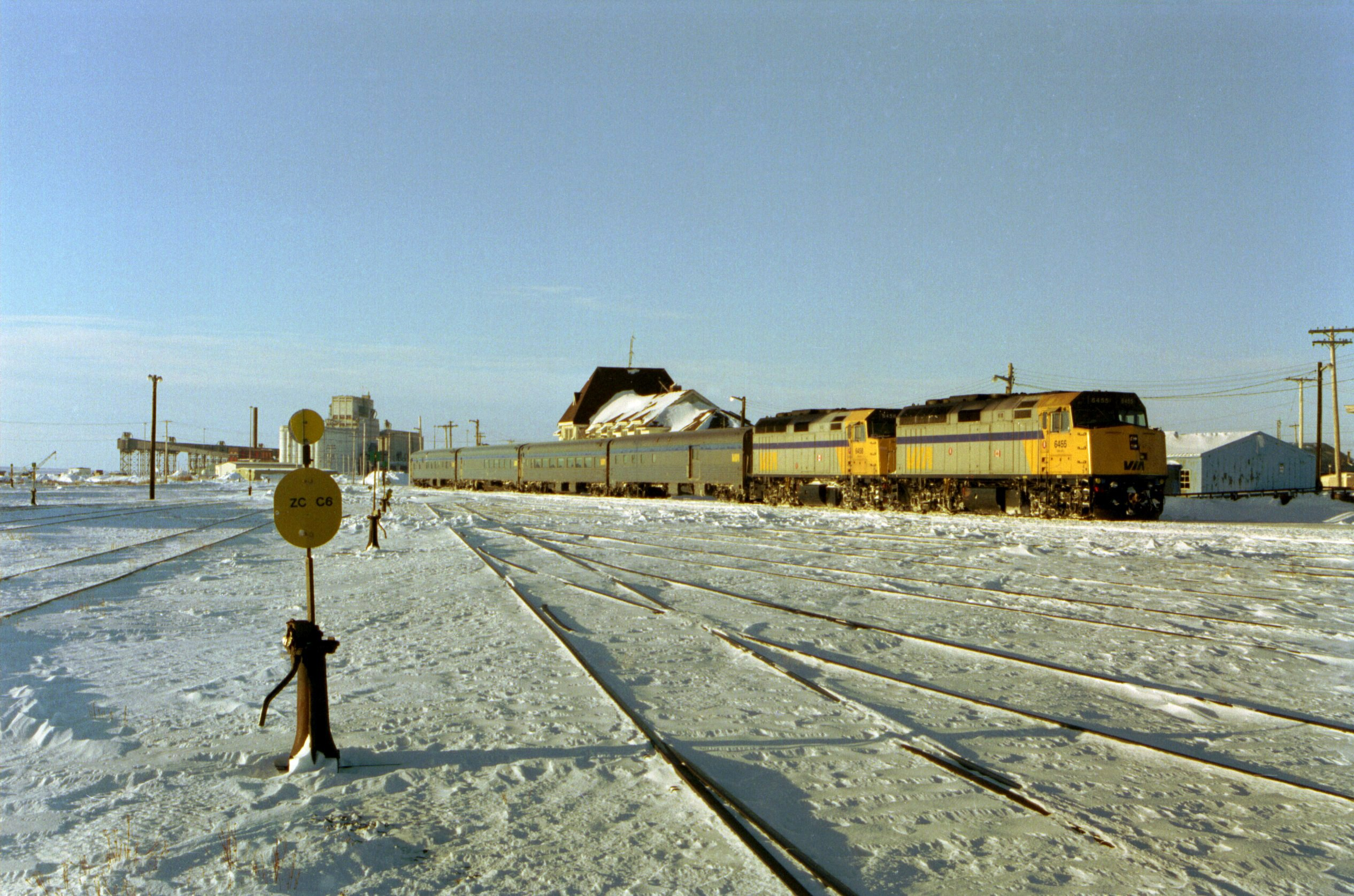
A Winnipeg–Churchill train at Churchill in 1997

An unnamed mixed passenger train connecting with the Winnipeg–Churchill train at The Pas previously served Lynn Lake, but this service was truncated to Pukatawagan in 2003 by the then track owners OmniTRAX citing a loss in freight traffic making the service unprofitable. Via still operates twice weekly service from The Pas to Pukatawagan on behalf of the Keewatin Railway which now owns the Sherridon Subdivision.

=== 2017 flooding ===
Service between Gillam and Churchill was suspended on May 23, 2017, when flooding heavily damaged the track bed and bridges. Because supplies had to be flown in by air when train service was suspended, prices skyrocketed in Churchill.

Repairs of the track began on September 8, 2018. By October 31, 2018, the track was repaired, and passenger services resumed with train 693 on December 2.

== List of stations ==
Name	Province	Coordinates
Winnipeg	MB	49°53′20″N 97°08′03″W
Portage la Prairie	MB	49°58′38″N 98°17′17″W
Gladstone	MB	50°13′31″N 98°56′54″W
Plumas	MB	50°23′05″N 99°05′23″W
Glenella	MB	50°33′24″N 99°11′46″W
McCreary	MB	50°46′25″N 99°29′23″W
Laurier	MB	50°53′17″N 99°33′39″W
Ochre River	MB	51°03′37″N 99°46′48″W
Dauphin	MB	51°09′02″N 100°03′06″W
Gilbert Plains	MB	51°08′52″N 100°29′13″W
Grandview	MB	51°10′18″N 100°41′56″W
Roblin	MB	51°13′48″N 101°21′08″W
Togo	SK	51°24′N 101°35′W
Kamsack	SK	51°34′N 101°54′W
Veregin	SK	51°34′41″N 102°04′40″W
Mikado	SK	51°36′31″N 102°16′16″W
Canora	SK	51°38′15″N 102°26′13″W
Sturgis	SK	51°56′26″N 102°32′38″W
Endeavour	SK	52°09′38″N 102°39′29″W
Reserve	SK	52°28′00″N 102°39′04″W
Hudson Bay	SK	52°51′47″N 102°23′48″W
The Pas	MB	53°49′26″N 101°14′51″W
Tremaudan	MB	53°54′32″N 101°10′16″W
Orok	MB	53°57′28″N 101°03′26″W
Dering	MB	54°15′15″N 100°32′00″W
Finger	MB	54°00′25″N 100°52′26″W
Budd	MB	54°02′56″N 100°48′18″W
Halcrow	MB	54°10′38″N 100°37′29″W
Cormorant	MB	54°13′26″N 100°36′01″W
Dering	MB	54°15′15″N 100°32′00″W
Rawebb	MB	54°18′26″N 100°19′12″W
Dyce	MB	54°22′03″N 100°09′24″W
Paterson	MB	54°25′35″N 99°59′43″W
Wekusko	MB	54°30′12″N 99°45′04″W
Turnbull	MB	54°33′58″N 99°28′37″W
Ponton	MB	54°38′36″N 99°09′32″W
Button	MB	54°40′44″N 98°59′41″W
Dunlop	MB	54°44′39″N 98°51′43″W
Pipun	MB	54°50′19″N 98°45′13″W
Wabowden	MB	54°54′32″N 98°37′47″W
Lyddal	MB	55°01′46″N 98°24′53″W
Odhill	MB	55°06′27″N 98°13′30″W
Earchman	MB	55°09′24″N 98°06′31″W
La Perouse	MB	56°24′35″N 94°31′49″W
Hockin	MB	55°16′35″N 97°49′50″W
Thicket Portage	MB	55°19′05″N 97°41′13″W
Leven	MB	55°22′51″N 97°32′32″W
Thompson	MB	55°44′26″N 97°49′47″W
Sipiwesk	MB	55°27′20″N 97°24′26″W
Pikwitonei	MB	55°35′16″N 97°09′20″W
Bridgar	MB	55°38′13″N 97°03′42″W
Wilde	MB	55°43′35″N 96°48′46″W
Arnot	MB	55°46′02″N 96°41′05″W
Boyd	MB	55°52′40″N 96°28′21″W
Pit Siding	MB	55°54′34″N 96°19′03″W
Munk	MB	55°58′44″N 95°59′34″W
Ilford	MB	56°03′53″N 95°36′25″W
Nonsuch	MB	56°07′35″N 95°22′38″W
Wivenhoe	MB	56°10′35″N 95°12′46″W
Luke	MB	56°17′45″N 94°51′17″W
Gillam	MB	56°20′50″N 94°42′28″W
Bird	MB	56°30′13″N 94°12′38″W
Amery	MB	56°33′54″N 94°03′45″W
Weir River	MB	56°49′04″N 94°05′33″W
Thibaudeau	MB	57°04′26″N 94°08′41″W
Herchmer	MB	57°22′19″N 94°11′14″W
O'Day	MB	57°34′39″N 94°12′14″W
M'Clintock	MB	57°48′06″N 94°12′49″W
Tidal	MB	58°39′47″N 94°07′13″W
Churchill	MB	58°46′04″N 94°10′27″W

VIA Winnipeg-Churchill
