= Keewatin Railway =

Shortline railway in Northern Manitoba, Canada

- Map of the Hudson Bay Railway, with the Sherridon Subdivision (left) in grey.

Overview
- Service type: Mixed
- Locale: Northern Manitoba
- Predecessor: Hudson Bay Railway
- First service: May 25, 2006
- Website: krcrail.ca

Route
- Termini: The Pas; Pukatawagan
- Stops: 4
- Distance travelled: 160 mi (260 km)

Technical
- Track gauge: 4 ft 8 1/2 in (1,435 mm) standard gauge
- Track owners: Mathias Colomb First Nation; Tataskweyak Cree Nation; War Lake First Nation
- Timetable number: 290 / 291

The Keewatin Railway Company (reporting mark KRC) is a rail company that operates a shortline mixed train service in Northern Manitoba between The Pas and the Pukatawagan Indian reserve. The twice-weekly service – branded as 290 for the southbound route and 291 for northbound – utilizes the Sherridon Subdivision, a branch line between Cranberry Portage and Lynn Lake. The company bought the line from the Hudson Bay Railway in 2006, and commenced its service in May. KRC is co-owned by the Mathias Colomb, Tataskweyak, and War Lake First Nations, and is one of two passenger railway operators in Canada owned by First Nations, alongside Tshiuetin Rail Transportation.

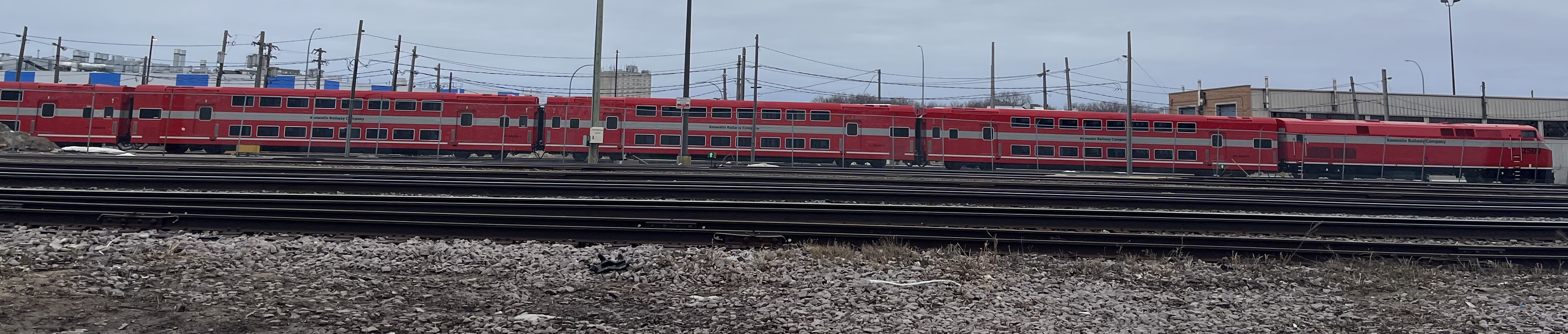
KRC train in Winnipeg, from Scotland Ave - April 2026

== History ==
The rail line was originally the 185-mile (310 km-long) Sherridon Subdivision, between Sheritt Junction and Lynn Lake. This was part of the Hudson Bay Railway (HBRY) system, and Via Rail had operated trains between The Pas and Pukatawagan under an agreement with HBRY, but had suspended them from July 27 and August 2, 2005, because the Hudson Bay Railway line had become unsafe due to recent heavy rains in the area loosening the railbed.

On April 1, 2006, the Hudson Bay Railway sold the Sherridon Subdivision to the three first nations in the area, who now own and operate the railway. The First Nations-owned railway company received $4.9 million dollars in grants from the Government of Canada, $1.25 million from the Government of Manitoba and $500,000 from three First Nations communities (the Mathaias Colomb Indian Band, Tataskweyak Cree Nation, and the War Lake First Nation, who jointly own and operate the railway to this day) for the railway line purchase. The Federal Government has also given the three tribes up to $3.2 million for start-up fees and investments, which include the purchase of locomotives, railway equipment, transitional services, office equipment, and infrastructure work (maintenance) on the rail line. This funding comes from the Regional and Remote Passenger Rail Services Contribution Program administered by Transport Canada.

== Service ==
As of 2026, two weekly round-trips run between Pukatawagan and The Pas. The full trip is scheduled to take 7 1/2 hours in each direction.

List of Keewatin Railway stops
Station	Locale served	Interchange(s)
The Pas	The Pas	Winnipeg–Churchill
Cranberry Portage	Cranberry Portage	
Sherridon	Sherridon	
Pukatawagan	Pukatawagan	
