= Cranberry Portage =

Community in Manitoba, Canada

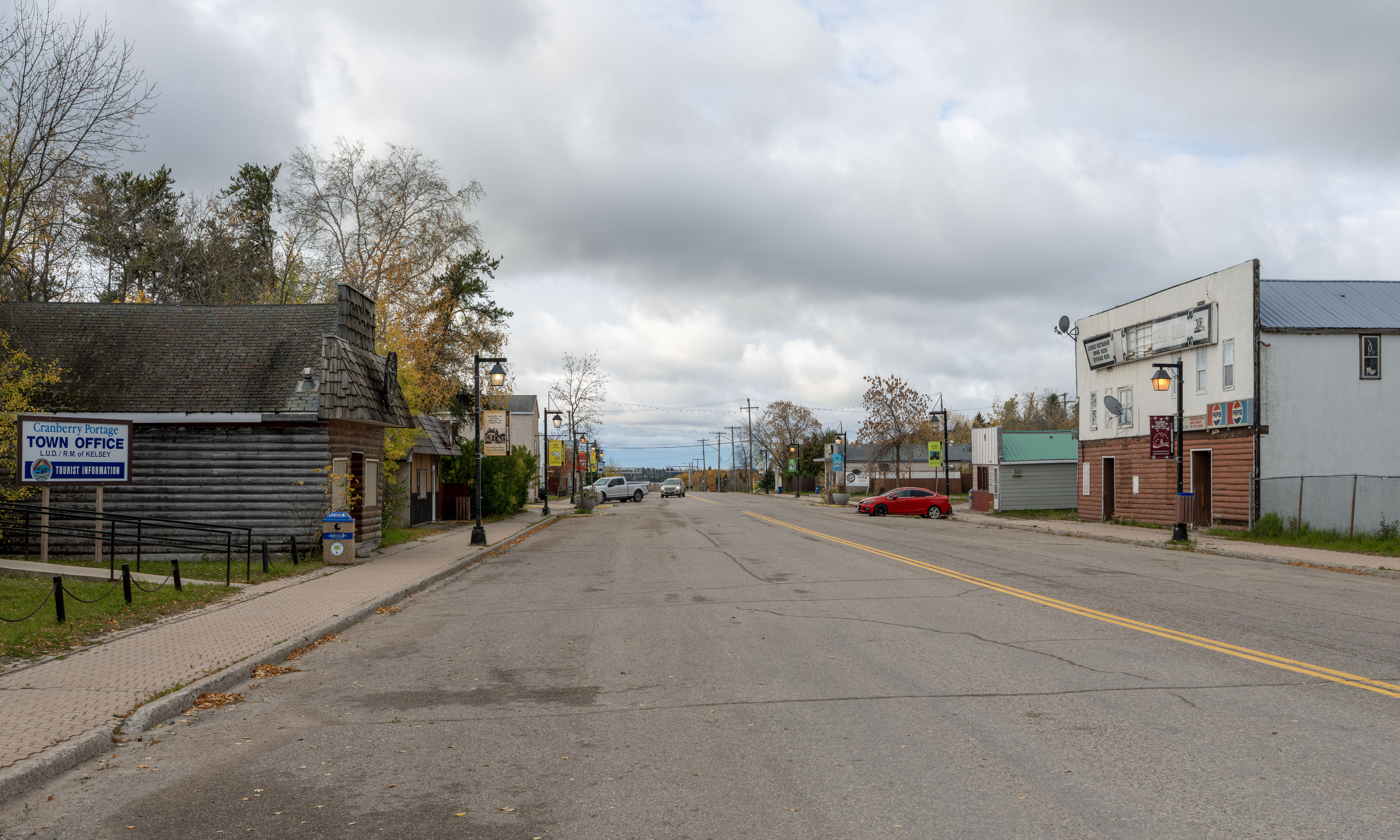
- Portage Road

- Location of Cranberry Portage in Manitoba Cranberry Portage (Canada)
- Coordinates: 54°35′10″N 101°22′38″W
- Country: Canada
- Province: Manitoba
- Rural Municipality: Kelsey

Area
  - Total: 8.31 km^{2} (3.21 sq mi)

Population (2021)
  - Total: 608
  - Density: 83.7/km^{2} (217/sq mi)
- Time zone: UTC-6 (CST)
  - Summer (DST): UTC-5 (CDT)

Cranberry Portage is an unincorporated community recognized as a local urban district located in the Rural Municipality of Kelsey, Manitoba. It was an important part of the pre-European contact trade routes of the Cree and Assiniboine peoples. Long before the fur trade with the Bay and during the Fur Trade, this location was used as a campsite and portage between Grassy River, at the head of a number of well-used routes from Hudson Bay, and Lake Athapapuskow, which connected to the Saskatchewan River system. Once on the Saskatchewan routes were open through the prairies to the foothills of the Rocky Mountains.

== History ==
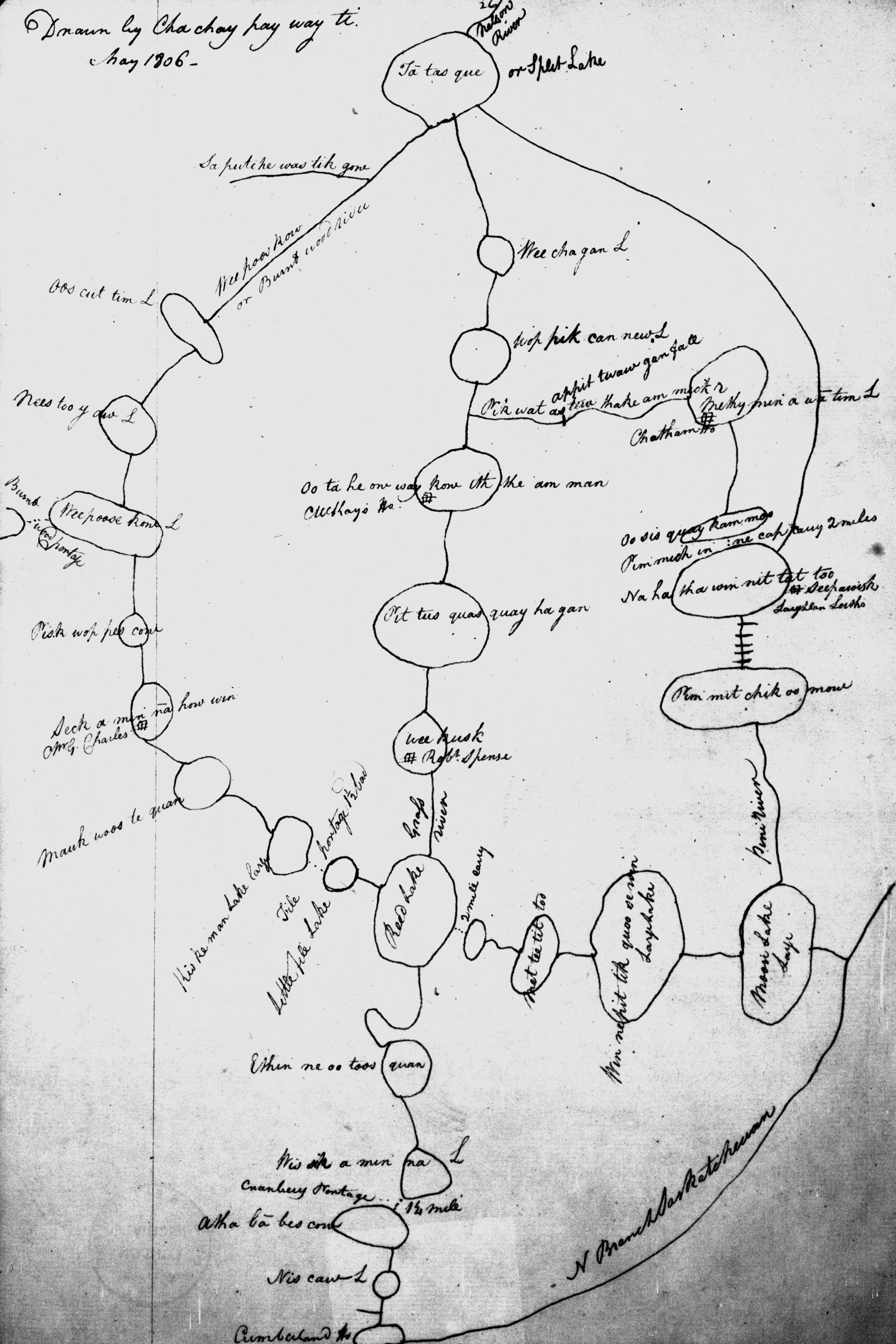
Cha Chay Pay Way Ti's Map of the Waterways of a Part of Northern Manitoba (1806)

The area has been inhabited since prehistoric times. Archaeological digs on Lake Athapapuskow revealed pottery, arrowheads, and other artifacts which were at least 2,500 years old and indicated regular habitation by people of the Shield Archaic tradition, who hunted caribou in the area as far back as 7000 years ago. They were eventually supplanted by the Woodland Cree who were nomadic hunters in this region.

The site of Cranberry Portage has been an important portage route linking the Grass River and Saskatchewan River watersheds for at least 2,000 years. The first European believed to have used that route and reach Lake Athapapuskow was the fur trader Joseph Smith in 1763. In 1774, the explorer Samuel Hearne paddled up the Grass River to Cranberry Portage and into Lake Athapapuskow en route to establishing Cumberland House. This route became an important part of the North American fur trade, known as the "Upper Tract". It was abandoned by 1800 in favour of the Nelson River and Hayes River routes. In 1806, explorer and surveyor Peter Fidler recorded the main waterways of his Cree partners in the notable "Cha Chay Pay Way Ti's Map of the Waterways of a Part of Northern Manitoba", Cranberry Portage is clearly marked on it.

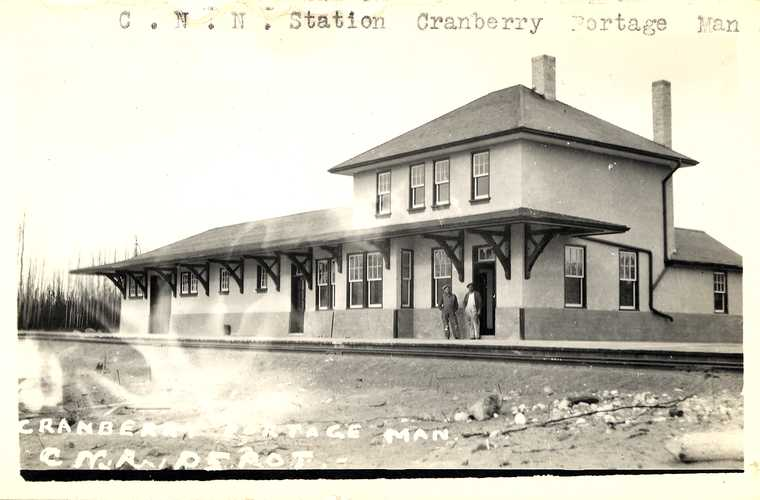
Cranberry Portage railway station c. 1910

In the early 20th century, rich gold, copper, and zinc deposits were discovered nearby in what would soon become the area of Flin Flon, Manitoba. Mining development in the area fueled a great deal of local infrastructure development, beginning with the extension of the rail line and Highway 10 from The Pas, Manitoba to Flin Flon, both of which passed through Cranberry Portage, a requirement of having large lakes lying north and south of the traditional portage.

Following the conclusion of World War II, the Department of National Defence took a decided interest in the location of Cranberry Portage.

With the recent memory of the German V-2 Rocket program, the development of the Russian Nuclear Missile Program, and the subsequent development of the DEW Line (Distant Early Warning System) in the high Arctic in the late 1950s/early 1960s, the Department of National Defence felt it prudent to also construct secondary back-up radar stations further south. Cranberry Portage, with its road and rail access being conveniently located 60 kilometres from a perceived Russian military target like Flin Flon Area mines and smelters, was an ideal location to establish such a back-up system in the interests of national defence, and became one of the locations for a Mid-Canada Line Installation.

In March 1964, the Government of Canada ceased its operations in Cranberry Portage. The entire complex that was Mid Canada Line Sector Control Station 700 was sold to the Government of Manitoba, who in turn sold the facility to the Frontier School Division. By the late 1960s, the former Mid Canada Line Installation became Frontier Collegiate Institute Campus, Frontier Collegiate Residence, and the Area Four Administrative Offices. Most of the base facilities are still in use today although many of their purposes have changed.

Today, the former Mess Hall provides all dietary services to high school students who reside on campus. The Officers Club is utilized primarily as a meeting room and location for large group presentations, and though the bar is still present, it has not been used for its intended purpose since the change of ownership. The helicopter hangar is now the home to the Area Four school buses. Officers houses are now homes provided to teachers at subsidized rents, while the three barracks are used only for storage. The facility-wide mechanical systems are also still operational including an underground freshwater storage tank.

Cranberry Portage is home to the annual Bombardier Rally, where snow machine enthusiasts gather with their Bombardier vehicles.

== Demographics ==
In the 2021 Census of Population conducted by Statistics Canada, Cranberry Portage (Kelsey) had a population of 608 living in 253 of its 338 total private dwellings, a change of −21.1% from its 2016 population of 771. With a land area of 7.26 km^{2} (2.80 sq mi), it had a population density of 83.7/km^{2} (216.9/sq mi) in 2021.

== Notable people ==
- Irvin Head, sculptor
- Duncan Mercredi, poet
