= The Pas station =

Railway station in Manitoba, Canada

The Pas
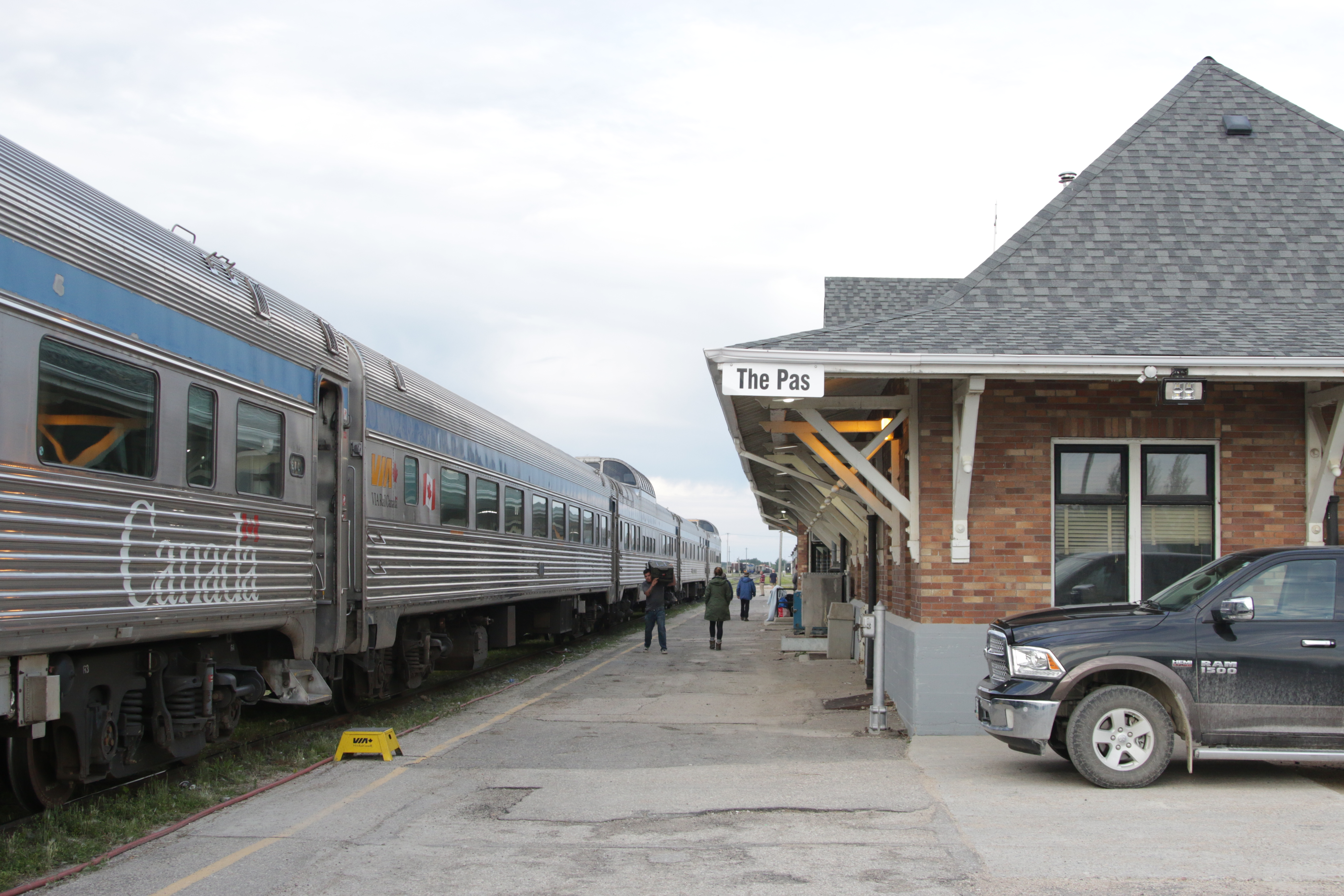
- The Pas Station in 2019

General information
- Location: 380 Hazelwood Avenue; The Pas, MB; Canada
- Coordinates: 53°49′26″N 101°14′52″W
- Lines: Winnipeg-Churchill; The Pas-Pukatawagan
- Platforms: 1
- Tracks: 1

Construction
- Structure type: Unstaffed station

Other information
- Station code: VIA Rail: TPAS; IATA: XDZ

History
- Opened: 1928

Services
Preceding station	Via Rail	Following station
Tremaudan toward Churchill	Winnipeg–Churchill	Hudson Bay toward Winnipeg
Preceding station	Keewatin Railway	Following station
Prospector toward Pukatawagan	The Pas–Pukatawagan	Terminus
Former services
Preceding station	Canadian National Railway	Following station
Prospector toward Flin Flon	Hudson Bay Junction – Flin Flon	Freshford toward Hudson Bay Junction
Tremaudan toward Churchill	Hudson Bay Railway	Terminus
Location

The Pas station is a railway station in The Pas, Manitoba, Canada. The station is served by Via Rail's Winnipeg–Churchill train and the Keewatin Railway train to Pukatawagan, which is also operated by Via.

The multi-coloured 1 1/2-storey brick station building was built in 1928. The railway station was designated a historic site in 1992.

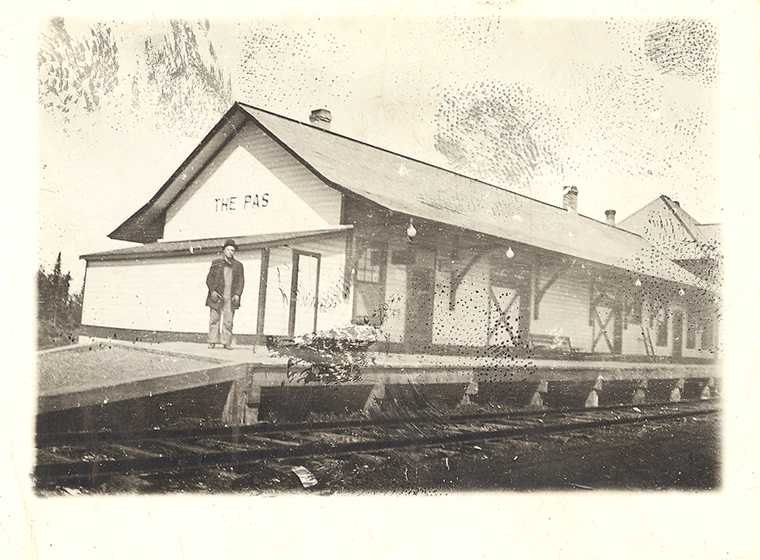
The Pas station as it appeared around 1909
