= Mathias Colomb First Nation =

First Nation in Manitoba, Canada

Mathias Colomb First Nation: ᐸᑲᑕᐚᑲᐣ (Cree); pukatawâkan (Cree); Pukatawagan
- Indian reserve
- Mathias Colomb First Nation Mathias Colomb First Nation (Canada)
- Coordinates: 55°44′43″N 101°17′18″W
- Country: Canada
- Province: Manitoba

Government
  - Type: First Nations Council

Area
  - Land: 18.3 km^{2} (7.1 sq mi)

Population (2016)
  - Total: 1,724
  - Density: 94.2/km^{2} (244/sq mi)
- Time zone: UTC−06:00 (CST)
  - Summer (DST): UTC−05:00 (CDT)
- Postal code span: R0B 1G0
- Area code: 204
- Mathias Colomb First Nation; Pukatawagan/Mathias Colomb Cree Nation
- Treaty: Treaty 6
- Headquarters: Pukatawagan
- Province: Manitoba

Government
- Chief: Gordie Bear
- Council: Gordie Bear; Wanda Bighetty; Moses Castel Sr.; Shirley Castel; Steven Castel; Travis Dumas; Alma Hart; David Hart; Selena Castel; Lorna Bighetty

Tribal Council
- Swampy Cree Tribal Council

The Mathias Colomb Cree Nation (MCCN) (Cree: ᐸᑲᑕᐚᑲᐣ, pukatawâkan)—also known as Mathias Colomb First Nation, Mathias Colomb (Cree) First Nation, and Pukatawagan/Mathias Colomb Cree Nation—is a remote First Nations community in northern Manitoba, located 210 km (130 mi) north of The Pas and 819 km (509 mi) northwest of Winnipeg, Manitoba.

It had two reserves under its jurisdiction, part of Treaty 6. The main community is at Indian Reserve 198 (Pukatawagan 198) in Pukatawagan, consisting of 1,536.6 ha (15.366 km^{2}; 5.933 mi^{2}) on the shore of Pukatawagan Lake, and lying about 210 km (130 mi) north of The Pas. The second reserve, Highrock reserve (Indian Reserve No. 199) (CSD), located on Highrock Lake, 30 km (19 mi) downstream from Pukatawagan, was dissolved by 2006.

== Demographics ==
According to Statistics Canada and based on the 2016 Census the population of Pukatawagan 198 was 1,724, a decrease of 5.6% from 2011. Of the 2016 population 1,680 people were registered or Treaty Indian, 45 identified as neither and 25 people identified non-Aboriginal. No other Indigenous peoples were identified. The First Nations peoples identified as Cree, Ojibway, Saulteaux and Sioux. Besides English people in the community spoke Cree-Montagnais languages, Central Algonquian languages and the Ojibway language

== History ==
The modern day residents of Mathias Colomb Cree Nation are primarily ancestral descendants of indigenous Cree peoples who have populated the Canadian Shield region of northern and central Canada since the retreat of the glaciers about 10,000 years ago. The indigenous people in the area have been known as Rocky Cree or Missinippi Cree (Asiniskaw Īthiniwak or Missinippi Īthiniwak) named after the traditional name for the Churchill River. (Missinippi - meaning large body of water).

The Mathias Colomb Cree Nation was originally part of the Pelican Narrows band, (Note: The First Nation people residing at Lac La Ronge selected James Robert as their Chief and became known for sometime as the James Robert's Band, later known as the Lac La Ronge Indian Band (Stonechild, 1980, pp. 1-2). At the time of the adhesion to Treaty 6 on 11 February 1889, at Montreal Lake in northern Saskatchewan, Lac La Ronge Band Wood Cree Indians under James Roberts numbered two hundred & seventy-eight (278) persons. In 1900 the people at Pelican Narrows, requested that the Chief and Council of the James Roberts Band consent to the separation of the Pelican Narrows people. "In 1907, Pakitawakan people (Pukatawagan people) requested for separate annuity payments to be paid in Pakitawagan (Pukatawagan.)"Bear 2002) Saskatchewan. Pelican Narrows (Note: In the 1890s "future members of the Cree Nation centred at Pelican Narrows entered Treaty Six, paddling to La Rouge to state their case with the Indian Agent of the day. In 1898, Indian Agent Hilton Keith traveled to Pelican Narrows and admitted over 100 more individuals living there into the Lac La Range Indian Band. As Pelican Narrows continued pressing their claim to be recognized as a separate Band, the Department of Indian Affairs finally relented and recognized the Cree Nation as a separate entity apart from the Lac La Ronge Indian Band in August, 1900."PBCN 2009) join Mirond and Pelican Lakes which lie between the Sturgeon-Weir and Churchill River systems. The Mathias Colomb band first settled along the Churchill River or Missinippi (meaning 'big water' in Woodland Cree) at Highrock Lake in the Prayer River area after their separation in 1910 from the Peter Ballantyne band. The Mathias Colomb Indian band, now Mathias Colomb Cree Nation, was formed as a separate reserve in 1910 and officially recognized by the Canadian federal government in 2011. In 1910, the inspector of Indian Affairs recognized Pukatawagan as a separate reserve with Mathias Colomb as the first chief of the reserve. He remained as chief until his death in 1932.

On 29 August 1926, Ayamihi Sippi (Prayer River) was surveyed as a reserve under the jurisdiction of the "Mathias Colomb Indian Band, over 18,000 acres of the 19,000 acre reserves is rock... Pakitawagan, the original fishing place of the people was also selected as one of the reserves." A fire destroyed the Prayer River community in the late 1960s and the band was forced to relocate to the Pukatawagan reserve."

As of 2019 the chief is Lorna Bighetty and the councillors are Gordie Bear, Lorna Bighetty, Shirley Bighetty, Wanda Bighetty, Ralph Caribou, Flora Jean Castel, Shirley Castel, Steven Castel, Darrell Linklater and Valerie Whyte.

The Swampy Cree Tribal Council is the tribal council affiliated with this First Nation. The Swampy Cree Tribal Council lists the Mathias Colomb Cree Nation and the Marcel Colomb First Nation with its head office in Lynn Lake, as Missinippi Cree.

== Housing ==
In 2016, there were 384 private dwellings. In 2007, ten Winnipeg residents visited their first Indian reserve, Pukatawagan, and their essays were published in the Winnipeg Free Press. "They were shocked and appalled at the overcrowded living conditions. A severe housing shortage had as many as 25 people sharing a small house, eating and showering in shifts. The community had few amenities because a diesel spill caused by faulty equipment installed by Indian Affairs and Manitoba Hydro during the 1970s had contaminated the town centre, causing the band hall, nursing station, school and about 100 houses to be torn down. Violence, substance abuse and poverty prevailed in Pukatawagan for decades while the community argued with mainstream officials about who was responsible and who would pay for cleaning up the mess and rebuilding.

In his report, based on his visit to Pukatawagan and other First Nations and Inuit communities in Canada in October 2013, James Anaya, the United Nations special rapporteur on the rights of indigenous peoples, reported that "The well-being gap between aboriginal and non-aboriginal people in Canada has not narrowed over the last several years, treaty and aboriginals claims remain persistently unresolved, and overall there appear to be high levels of distrust among aboriginal peoples toward government at both the federal and provincial levels. Canada consistently ranks near the top among countries with respect to human development standards, and yet amidst this wealth and prosperity, aboriginal people live in conditions akin to those in countries that rank much lower and in which poverty abounds. At least one in five aboriginal Canadians live in homes in need of serious repair, which are often also overcrowded and contaminated with mould." (Note: "One in five aboriginal Canadians lives in a home in need of serious repairs."Commisso 2013)

== Youth suicide ==
James Anaya, the UN's special rapporteur on the rights of indigenous peoples was deeply concerned by the suicide rate in aboriginal communities. He noted particularly that in Pukatawagan there has been a suicide (once) every six weeks since January 2013. Twenty-year-old Shawn Bighetty died by suicide in 2009 and his mother, Lorna Bighetty, a resident of Pukatawagan, "says something must be done to help her community, where poverty is prevalent. Since Shawn's death, there have been as many as 27 more suicides at Pukatawagan, which is home to 2,500 residents." (Note: The "suicide rate among youth on reserves is "alarming" at a rate five times greater than that of all Canadians."Commisso 2013)

== Land claims ==
In May 1997, the Treaty Land Entitlement Committee (TLEC) representing Mathias Colomb and 18 other Entitlement First Nations (EFNs), (Note: Other EFN include Barren Lands, Buffalo Point, Brokenhead Ojibway, Fox Lake, God's Lake, God's River, Mathias Colomb Cree, Nisichawaysihk Cree, Oxford House, Norway House Cree, NortWands, Opaskwayak Cree, Rolling River, Sapotaweyak Cree, Sayisi Dene, Shamattawa, War Lake, Wuskwi Sipihk and York Factory) signed the Framework Agreement Treaty Land Entitlement with the province of Manitoba and the Government of Canada, in which Canada and Manitoba agreed to "fulfil the acknowledged outstanding treaty land entitlement obligations for those 20 First Nations, satisfying the per capita land provisions of treaties signed by Canada and the First Nations between 1871 and 1910."

== Transportation ==
Pukatawagan Airport is located 2.5 nautical miles (4.6 km; 2.9 mi) east of the town and the community-owned Missinippi Airways provides scheduled, charter and medivacs. The temporary winter road (Kississing Lake to Pukatawagan) is open for about three months of the year based on weather. There is an existing pioneer road Provincial Trunk Highway 10 (PTH 10) to Sherridon. Like other small, remote northern communities, Mathias Colomb Cree Nation has no all-weather road access, although studies of its economic viability have been undertaken. The absence of an all-weather road imposes added freight and transportation costs on individuals, communities, government, and industry. The report examined the cost of the construction of an all-weather road from Provincial Trunk Highway 10 (PTH 10) to Pukatawagan and the benefits, if any, to all stakeholders: Pukatawagan First Nations, Sherridon, and Lynn Lake, Hudson Bay Railroad (HBRR), (OmniTRAX), freight haulers, air transporters and Tolko Industries Ltd.

=== Rail ===
On 20 August 1997 the OmniTRAX-owned Hudson Bay Railway (HBRY) began operation, using former Canadian National Railway (CN) lines that HBRY had purchased, covering more than 1,300 km (810 mi) of lines. The branch from The Pas with a branch to Flin Flon, Pukatawagan First Nations, Sherridon and Lynn Lake. Hudbay and Tolko are two of the major customers for HBRY.

The branch to Pukatawagan is currently operated by the First Nations-owned Keewatin Railway, which operates freight and passenger trains to The Pas.

Preceding station	Keewatin Railway	Following station
Terminus	The Pas–Pukatawagan	Pawistik toward The Pas

== Other services ==
Sakastew primary/secondary school, with an annual enrolment of 550 students, is community-operated. About 600 students attend school off the reserve.

Pukatawagan has a nursing station and a child and family services agency field office. Mathias Colomb First Nation Health Authority is affiliated with the Cree Nation Tribal Health Centre in The Pas which delivers culturally relevant health services to First Nations communities in the Swampy Cree Tribal Council Region. (Note: Other First Nations include Opaskwayak Cree Nation, Chemawawin Cree Nation, Grand Rapids First Nation, Sapotaweyak Cree Nation, Marcel Colomb First Nation, Wuskwi Sipihk First Nation and Mosakahiken Cree Nation.)

== Economic development ==
Missinippi Airways, with the official name of Beaver Air Services Limited Partnership, is 100% aboriginal-owned and operates regular flights between The Pas and Pukatawagan. In 1988, the Mathias Colomb Cree Nation created the Missinippi Construction Company Ltd which is 100% aboriginal-owned as well.

Subsistence hunting and fishing is augmented by some trapping and commercial fishing.
