= Riding Mountain =

Riding Mountain may refer to:

- Riding Mountain National Park in Manitoba, Canada
- Riding Mountain Biosphere Reserve in Manitoba, Canada
- Riding Mountain House, a Hudson's Bay Trading post in Manitoba, Canada
- Riding Mountain Airport, near the park
- Riding Mountain (federal electoral district), an electoral district in Manitoba
- Riding Mountain (provincial electoral district), an electoral district in Manitoba
- Riding Mountain (roller coaster), an 18th century roller coaster in Russia
- Rural Municipality of Riding Mountain West, Manitoba
