= George Flett =

Canadian Presbyterian missionary (1817-1897)

- Born: 10 February 1817; Moose Lake on the Saskatchewan River
- Died: 28 October 1897 (aged 80); Strathclair, Manitoba, Canada
- Occupation: Presbyterian missionary
- Spouse(s): Frances Cook (m. 1838; died 1839) Mary Ross (m. 1840)
- Parents: George Flett Snr. (father); Margaret Whitford (mother)

George Flett (10 February 1817 – 28 October 1897) was a Presbyterian missionary in what is now Manitoba, Canada. Flett was of Orkney and Cree descent. As a young man he farmed on the White Horse Plains, led a gold exploration party to Edmonton and then became the first post master for the Hudson's Bay Company at Fort Victoria, Alberta. Flett was an interpreter to the first Presbyterian mission to the northwest between 1866 and 1867. After serving as a delegate in the provisional government of Louis Riel during the Red River Rebellion, he became a missionary among the Ojibwa of Okanese Reserve, serving from 1873 to 1895.

== Early years ==
George Flett's father, George Flett Senior, came from the Orkney Islands, and worked for the Hudson's Bay Company. His mother, Margaret Whitford, was the daughter of an English man and a native woman, probably Cree. Flett was born at Moose Lake, Manitoba, which lies on the Saskatchewan River Delta. He was educated at the parish school and learned to speak English, French, Cree, and Ojibwa.

On August 7, 1838, Flett married Frances Cook. She died while giving birth to their daughter Letitia on August 4, 1839. On November 26, 1840, he married Mary Ross, the daughter of noted fur trader Alexander Ross and Sally Timentwa, daughter of an Okanase chief. In later years, Mary's familiarity with Indian languages and customs was to prove an advantage in their mission work. In 1861 their daughter Letitia married Alexander Murray, who was to be elected to the Manitoba parliament in 1874 and to have a distinguished career in politics.

Flett farmed in the Winnipeg area for several years. He grew wheat and maize successfully, turnips and potatoes with more difficulty. In 1862 he was one of the leaders of a large party that explored for gold in the area around Edmonton, Alberta. In September 1862 Flett wrote from Edmonton that some young men were earning $4 to $5 per day with the rocker, and an old American miner expected to get $10 when he had a sluice built. In May 1863, Flett wrote that after overwintering the party had reached "Mud Fort" about 55 miles (89 km) above Edmonton the previous month, and were finding gold in the river beds worth between 6s and 10s each day. Five hundred miners had crossed the mountains from the west and were said to have found gold in great quantities. There was a shortage of supplies however, and Flett was planning to plough for wheat. He saw a great future for agriculture in the rich soil of the region.

In 1864 Flett was given the job of opening a Hudson's Bay Company trading post in Fort Victoria, in the Edmonton region. Flett and John Norris led the first brigade of Red River ox-carts from Winnipeg to Edmonton, taking three and a half months on the journey. As clerk in charge of the Victoria trading post, Flett had to arrange for construction of the buildings and open up trade with the local Indians. The Clerks Quarters survives, one of the first buildings west of Winnipeg to have glass windows. Flett soon succeeded in obtaining a supply of good-quality furs, which he and his assistants took by horse and dog train to Fort Edmonton. While at Victoria, Flett made friends with both Methodist and Roman Catholic missionaries, and helped them understand the customs and the language of the Cree. He left this post in the spring of 1866.

== Presbyterian missionary ==
The Presbyterian minister James Nisbet had stayed in Flett's house on the White Horse Plains while Flett was in Victoria. In 1866, Nisbett was given permission to open a mission for the Cree in the north of the Saskatchewan River valley. He asked Flett to act as interpreter to the mission, and Flett accepted. The site chosen was about 30 miles (48 km) downstream from Fort Carlton. At first the local Cree were unwilling to grant permission for the mission, which they felt would attract European settlers and drive away the buffalo, but Flett managed to persuade them to accept the missionaries' right to settle there, pointing out that both he and his wife had native relatives.

The Fletts stayed at the Prince Albert mission for only a year. Flett disagreed with Nisbet's plan to found an agricultural settlement, feeling that an itinerant mission would be more useful. The Fletts returned to Red River during a time of political upheaval. He was appointed a delegate in the provisional government of Louis Riel, and was involved in debates over the terms on which Red River should join Canada. He had become a respected man, trusted by Europeans, Indians and Métis. At a convention of English and French Delegates in Council at Fort Garry in 1870 Flett said: "For my part, I am a half-breed, but far be it for me to press any land claim I may have against the poor Indian of the country. We have taken the position, and ask the rights, of civilized men. As to the poor Indian, let him by all means have all he can get. He needs it, and if our assistance will aid him in getting it let us cheerfully give it".

In June 1874 Flett was appointed a Presbyterian missionary for a large territory from Fort Pelly to south of Riding Mountain, 150 miles (240 km) away. He set up his headquarters on the Little Saskatchewan River. The mission, which he called "Okanese" (meaning "Little Bone" in the Ojibwa language), was at the Riding Mountain House Hudson's Bay Company post, near the present town of Elphinstone. At the age of fifty-seven, Flett was ordained on 18 August 1875. The native leader Keeseekoowenin, Flett's cousin, had signed a treaty with the government in 1871, and moved with his family and band to a reserve beside Flett's mission in 1875, where he was baptised as Moses Burns. Keeseekoowenin did not entirely abandon his traditional beliefs, but blended them with Christianity.

In November 1878 Flett wrote the first of a series of letters to the Canadian Woman's Foreign Missionary Society (WFMS) in Toronto, drawing their attention to the work being done in native Indian missions. In later letters he listed educational needs, and by 1884 the society was providing financial and material aid to schools and people in the northwest. By 1890 the Riding Mountain band had 137 people. Some were farmers but most lived by hunting. The school had 21 children. George Flett held services every Sunday on the reserve. Flett worked at the mission for over twenty years. Towards the end of his career he became involved in various squabbles with other church members, finally resigning in 1895. Flett died on 28 October 1897 at the age of 80.

== Sources ==
- Ajzenstat, Janet (2003). Canada's founding debates. University of Toronto Press. ISBN 0-8020-8607-1.
- Block, Alvina (Spring–Summer 1999). "George Flett, Presbyterian Missionary to the Ojibwa at Okanase". Manitoba Historical Society. 37. Winnipeg.
- Bumsted, J. M. (1999). Dictionary of Manitoba biography. Univ. of Manitoba Press. ISBN 0-88755-662-0.
- Canada. Dept. of Indian Affairs (1890). Annual report of the Department of Indian Affairs. Dept. of Indian Affairs.
- "Gold in the Hudson's Bay Territories". Journal of the Society of Arts. 11. The Society. 1863.
- Goyette, Linda; Roemmich, Carolina Jakeway (2005). Edmonton in Our Own Words. University of Alberta. ISBN 0-88864-449-3.
- Herzog, Lawrence (June 13, 2002). "Victoria Settlement at 140". It's Our Heritage. 20 (24).
- Hind, Henry Youle (1860). Narrative of the Canadian Red river exploring expedition of 1857: and of the Assinniboine and Saskatchewan exploring expedition of 1858, Volume 1. Longman, Green, Longman and Roberts.
- McMicking, Thomas (1981). Overland from Canada to British Columbia. UBC Press. ISBN 0-7748-0393-2.
- "Memorable Manitobans: Alexander "Sandy" Murray (1839-1913)". Manitoba Historical Society.
- Muir, Elizabeth Gillan; Whiteley, Marilyn Färdig (1995). Changing roles of women within the Christian church in Canada. University of Toronto Press. ISBN 0-8020-7623-8.
- Peterson, Jacqueline; Brown, Jennifer S. H. (2001). The new peoples: being and becoming métis in North America. Minnesota Historical Society Press. ISBN 0-87351-408-4.
- Robertson, John Palmerston (1887). A political manual of the province of Manitoba and the North-west Territories. Printed by the Call printing company. p. 57.
- The Home and foreign record of the Canada Presbyterian Church, Volumes 1-2. Printed for the Committee by W.C. Chewett. 1862.
- Keeseekoowenin - Dictionary of Canadian Biography Online
