= James Nisbet (missionary) =

Scottish-born missionary to Canada

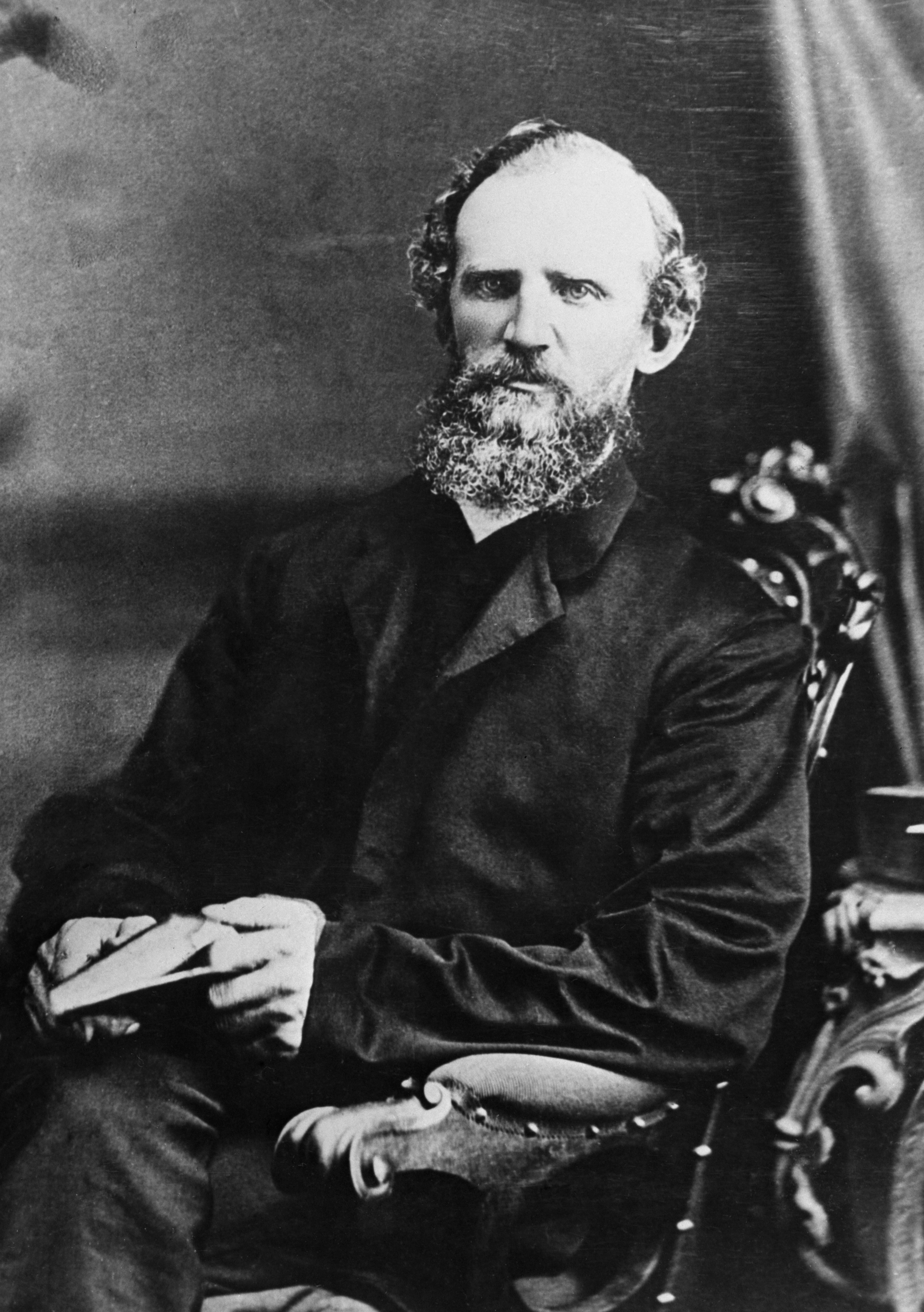
- Born: September 8, 1823; Glasgow, Scotland
- Died: September 30, 1874 (aged 51); Kildonan, Manitoba
- Education: Scottish, Canadian
- Occupations: Missionary, Clergyman, Carpentry
- Spouse: Mary MacBeth
- Relatives: Henry Nisbet

James Nisbet (September 8, 1823 – September 30, 1874) was a Scottish born missionary to Canada.

== Early life ==
He was born near Glasgow in Scotland, the youngest of 10 children. In 1840, he had travelled with his older brother, Henry, to London both seeking to serve as missionaries with the London Mission Society. Henry was accepted, and served in Samoa for 36 years. James returned to Glasgow, but still sensed a "call" to minister elsewhere, and emigrated to the New World in 1844, with his widower father and two sisters.

== Canada ==
Settling in Canada West in the growing city of Toronto, Nisbet studied at the newly established Knox College. He graduated in 1848, and after serving with the Canadian Sabbath School Mission, was Ordained as a Presbyterian Church of Canada (Free Church) minister in January 1850, and Inducted into the Oakville Presbyterian Church and Knox Church "Sixteen" pastoral charge, the latter where the Sixteen Mile Creek crossed Dundas Street. His father and siblings also joined him in Oakville, where his four children (all born in Western Canada) resided, after their parents' death in 1874, although two daughters were living with an aunt there from 1870.

He ministered to the Oakville and Knox 16 congregations (and on special assignments throughout the region, and beyond) for over twelve years, until he was appointed by the new Canada Presbyterian Church Synod, as a "foreign missionary" to assist his Knox College classmate John Black in the Red River Colony in 1862. Working with Black, he helped develop congregations in the area at Little Britain, Headingley and at Fort Garry, (later called Winnipeg). A school was built beside the original Kildonan Presbyterian Church, later named Nisbet Hall. The present University of Winnipeg traces its roots back to that school, where Manitoba College held its first classes in 1871.

After stressing the need for further ministry and mission to the Cree and Metis in Western Canada, the Synod then appointed him to move from Kildonan, further into the North-West.

== Prince Albert community ==
In 1866, he led a party of pioneers that included his wife, (1864) Mary MacBeth, the daughter of one of the Kildonan Church Elders and member of the Council of Assiniboia, to the Prince Albert area of Rupert's Land (later North-West Territories and now Saskatchewan.) George Flett acted as interpreter to the party. They arrived on July 26, 1866 and formed a mission to bring Christianity to the prairie Indian nations. Nisbet named the mission after Prince Albert, Queen Victoria's deceased consort. Gradually the community surrounding the mission adopted the name as well.

James Nisbet was both a clergyman and skilled carpenter. He built the First Presbyterian Church, a log structure that can today be found in nearby Kinsmen Park, Prince Albert. This building served as the Prince Albert Historical Museum, until a larger building (the former firehall) was acquired in 1975.

During the times of smallpox epidemics, he created a crude vaccination which saved hundreds of lives. He planted crops and gardens to help feed the population during several lean years. Two other Red River pioneers assisted him: John McKay and George Flett (related or connected by marriage to Mary MacBeth Nisbet). Both were later ordained and continued to be missionaries in the region for the rest of their lives. Nisbet also continued missionary travels in the North West, and reached as far away as Edmonton, Alberta, as well as making trips back to Oakville, and to important Presbyterian Church meetings.

After living in Prince Albert for almost eight years, Nisbet was forced back east to Kildonan due to ill health, initially with his wife. Both died there in September 1874, she in the arms of her husband and father, and he a few days later. They had four children.

They were buried in simple graves in the Kildonan Churchyard (off Kildonan Highway at John Black Avenue in present-day North Winnipeg), that were upgraded years later. It was noted in an early biographical account for those searching the Kildonan Cemetery to find an early memorial to the Nisbets, to travel far from Kildonan to Prince Albert, the Memorial being the active city and St. Paul's Presbyterian Church.

== Memorials ==
The Prince Albert, a high school, had been established named after Rev. Nisbet with one of the staff members being Lucy Margaret Baker. The Prince Albert mission became a congregation on July 1, 1883. The present St. Paul's Presbyterian Church was built on that site in 1906 and was a continuation of the pioneer congregation sprouting from Nisbet's missionary service. St Paul's can still be found beside the Gabriel Dumont Institute, in downtown Prince Albert, a block away from City Hall. On May 1, 2005, the Moderator of the General Assembly of the Presbyterian Church in Canada, Rev. Dr. Richard Fee, led the congregation, then without a settled pastor, in celebration of the centennial of the Province of Saskatchewan.

James Nisbet School in northwest Winnipeg is also named after him.

There is a James Nisbet Street in Glasgow, Scotland.

== See also ==
- James Isbister
- Nisbet Provincial Forest
- Prince Albert, Saskatchewan
- Red River Colony
