= Keeseekoowenin =

- Born: 1818; Bow River
- Died: 1906 (aged 87–88); Keeseekoowenin Reserve
- Other names: Moses Burns
- Known for: Native American Leader

Keeseekoowenin (c. 1818 – 10 April 1906) was a First Nations leader during the period when Canada was expanding into the prairie provinces of Manitoba, Saskatchewan and Alberta.

== Origins ==
Keeseekoowenin (Giizhigowinin, "Sky-man") was born around 1818 in the Bow River area of what is now the province of Alberta. His father was Chief Okanase (Okanens), meaning "Little Bone", also known as Michael Cardinal, of the Saulteaux branch of the Ojibwe people. His father's band were fur traders who had drifted westwards from Quebec to the Rocky Mountains over several generations. His mother was of mixed Orkney and native American ancestry. Several of Chief Okanase's sons became prominent leaders on the prairies. Some traditions say that Chief Okanase's sister was wife of the Hudson's Bay Company (HBC) trader George Flett. Their son George Flett later became a Presbyterian missionary attached to Keeseekoowenin's band. Certainly Keeseekoowenin and Flett's mother were related.

== Family travels ==
In 1822 Keeseekoowenin's band and family moved to the Riding Mountain area in modern-day Manitoba. Led by Chief Okanase, the band hunted, trapped and traded with the Fort Ellice and Riding Mountain House HBC posts. Chief Okanase died about 1870 and was succeeded by his son Mekis ("Eagle"), Keeseekoowenin's half brother. His band signed Treaty Two with the Canadian federal government in 1871, obtaining land around the Turtle and Valley rivers near Dauphin Lake. They moved their reserve to a location near Elphinstone, Manitoba in 1875. The new reserve was around the Riding Mountain House trading post.

== Chief ==
When parts of the treaty were renegotiated in 1875, Keeseekoowenin and his brother Baptiste Bone were recognised by the government as chiefs of the band, since Mekis had recently died. The band hunted and fished on the federal land around Clear Lake, and in 1896 the Clear Lake Reserve was formally established, with Baptiste Bone as chief. Keeseekoowenin remained chief of the original reserve, although the government considered he was chief of both. Government and church officials praised Keeseekoowenin's group as model Christian farmers, while disparaging the more "primitive" Clear Lake hunters and fishers. In 1935 the Clear Lake group was evicted, in part to make way for tourists but also to encourage the group to assimilate by taking up farming.

Keeseekoowenin's band accepted the Presbyterian mission of his cousin George Flett, and Keeseekoowenin was baptized as Moses Burns. However, he still retained some traditional beliefs and customs. While wanting his people to benefit from education and Christianity, he also wanted to preserve the best of their traditional values and practices. Keeseekoowenin had an imposing physical presence, and was highly skilled as a trapper, buffalo hunter and farmer. He died on 10 April 1906 on Keeseekoowenin Reserve, and was buried there. He was succeeded as chief by his half-brother George Bone. He left three sons and seven daughters. His daughter Harriet Burns married Glenlyon Campbell, who became a legislator in Winnipeg and Ottawa. His son Solomon Burns became a highly respected Presbyterian leader.
