= Riding Mountain Biosphere Reserve =

UNESCO Biosphere Reserve in Manitoba, Canada

- Official Logo of the Riding Mountain Biosphere Reserve.

- Location within Manitoba Location within Canada
- Location: Manitoba, Canada
- Nearest city: Dauphin
- Coordinates: 50°30′0.935″N 99°54′44.686″W
- Area: 15,000 km^{2} (5,800 sq mi)
- Designated: 1986
- Governing body: UNESCO
- Website: http://www.rmbr.ca

Riding Mountain Biosphere Reserve (RMBR) is a UNESCO World Biosphere Reserve designated by the United Nations Educational, Scientific and Cultural Organization (UNESCO) in 1986 as part of its Man and the Biosphere Programme. The RMBR, which encompasses Riding Mountain National Park and twelve surrounding municipalities in the province of Manitoba, is one of 16 Biosphere Reserves in Canada. Ecologically sensitive ecosystems include the grasslands, deciduous forest and boreal forest. Although grasslands occupy only 7,400 of the total 1,331,800 hectares, they are considered of national importance since they exist as discrete units and the rare climax rough fescue community represents the eastern extent of its range. The Biosphere Reserve extends the protection of these ecosystems outside of park boundaries. Municipalities in the Riding Mountain Biosphere Reserve include Clanwilliam – Erickson, Dauphin, Gilbert Plains, Grandview, Harrison Park, Lakeshore, McCreary, Rosedale, St. Rose, Riding Mountain West, Rossburn, and Yellowhead. First Nations in the Biosphere Reserve include Rolling River First Nation, Keeseekoowenin First Nation, Waywayseecappo First Nation, and Tootinaowaziibeeng First Nation. Asessippi Provincial Park and Duck Mountain Provincial Forest also border the Biosphere Reserve.

== History ==
Created in 1986, the Riding Mountain Biosphere Reserve is a non-profit volunteer organization, managed by representatives from the surrounding area. The organization's stated mission is "to foster and encourage, through research, information exchange, education and communication, a sustainable regional economy with high biodiversity and landscape values, with Riding Mountain National Park as a key component." Prior to its creation in 1986, The Riding Mountain Liaison Committee (RMNLC) was entrusted to oversee the integration of this area and surrounding communities, eleven of which participated in a consultation process.

Upon establishment, the Biosphere Reserve included 18 municipalities, several of which were merged in 2015 as a result of the Manitoba Municipal Amalgamation Act enacted in 2013 by the Manitoba provincial government. A Biosphere Reserve Management Committee (BRMC) was created to oversee the area. Biosphere Reserve land situated outside of Riding Mountain National Park is both privately and publicly owned and managed.

Local initiatives hosted by the Biosphere Reserve include a spring market, a native species garden, educational programming and geocaching programs. Public workshops held by the Biosphere Reserve covered topics such as climate change, beaver problems, sustainable agriculture, and the potential of poplar. In 1996 when Louisiana Pacific received hardwood cutting rights, the Biosphere Reserve researched "the impact of timber harvesting on cavity nesting birds and other species found in the corridor between the Ducks and Riding Mountain.".

Other activities undertaken by the Biosphere Reserve include the rehabilitation of fish spawning areas on the Milk River. In December 1998 an elk in Riding Mountain National Park tested positive for bovine tuberculosis. Because beavers, elk and moose freely moved within the boundary of the park and surrounding region, there was a risk of the disease spreading. Some of the areas susceptible included agricultural farmland bordering the park. In 2012 a Water Stewardship Project was launched in association with the Centre for Sustainable Watershed. More recently funding issues have created a challenged for continued programming.

== Geography ==
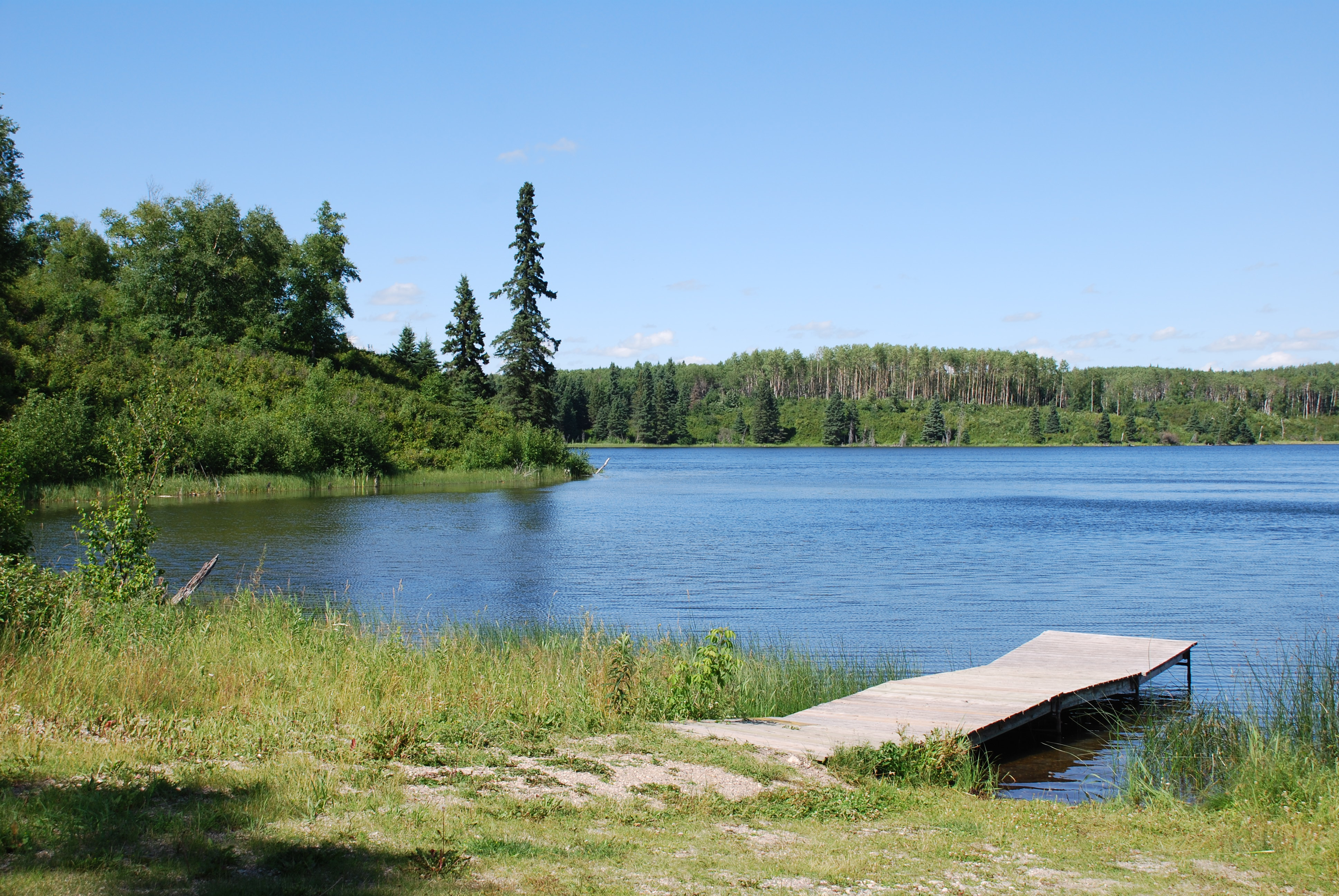
Deep Lake in Riding Mountain National Park

Riding Mountain Biosphere Reserve covers 15,000 square kilometres of land in South-western Manitoba, with the core area, Riding Mountain National Park (RNMP), covering nearly 3,000 square kilometres. It is some 300 km northwest of Winnipeg, Manitoba. The Park, established in 1933 and governed by Parks Canada, predates RMBR by fifty-three years. It has a town site, Wasagaming, several trails, and a wild bison enclosure at Lake Audy.

Significant geographic landmarks in Riding Mountain Biosphere Reserve include the Shell River Valley in the west, Manitoba Escarpment in the East, and Valley River and Wilson River in the North. The local climate is cool and moist due to a higher elevation than the surrounding area. Due to these unique conditions, several different ecosystems are present in the vicinity of the Biosphere Reserve, including the deciduous forest, boreal forest, and grassland. Many small lakes and marshes dot the landscape in the transition zone.

A total of 29, 758 individuals reside in the transition zone of the Biosphere Reserve as of the 2011 census, with an average population of 2.8 persons per square kilometre. When the area under the jurisdiction of Riding Mountain National Park is taken into account, the population density is 2.2 persons per square kilometre.

=== Ecological characteristics ===
Forests cover most of the area, dominated by aspen (Populus tremuloides). Although grasslands occupy only 7,400 of the total 1,331,800 hectares, they are considered of national importance since they exist as discrete units and the rare climax rough fescue community represents the eastern extent of its range. Grasslands once occurred throughout southern Manitoba, but have been transformed since European settlement in the late nineteenth century. The biosphere reserve also includes agricultural areas that used to be forests or grasslands. The forest ecosystem maintains many larger mammals, such as black bear (Ursus americanus), American bison (Bison bison), gray wolf (Canis lupus) and coyote (Canis latrans).

=== Socio-economic characteristics ===
Descendants of the Ojibwa First Nations live in four relatively small Indian Reserves within the transition zone. The rest of the area is settled mainly by people of Ukrainian, English, French or Scandinavian descent.

The region supports a rural agricultural economy supplemented by tourism associated principally with the national park. The national park also maintains a well-developed interpretive centre with a wide variety of public information materials.

In terms of the human population, a small number of permanent residents live within the core area in the form of resident park wardens and their families at warden stations along the periphery of the National Park. However, since 2000 most of these stations have been closed. A large, seasonal population of cabin owners occupies a site in Wasagaming town in Riding Mountain National Park during the summer months, with up to 15,000 people occupying the site during peak periods.

== Events ==
- Sandy Lake Western Days

Held one weekend each summer in Sandy Lake, Manitoba, in the Rural Municipality of Harrison Park, this family festival includes bed races, a pancake breakfast, fireworks display, and an interdenominational hymn.

- Clear Lake Chamber Music Festival

The Clear Lake Chamber Music Festival is a classical live music festival in Manitoba. The first Festival, held in 2006, featured pianist Alexander Tselyakov, cellist Yuri Hooker, violinists Daniel Scholz, and Philippe and Mark Djokic.

- Harvest Sun Music Festival

This Canadian prairie music festival, held in Kelwood, Manitoba, features local musicians and was first held in 2006. It has featured musicians such as Fred Penner, Sierra Noble, Old Bones Buffalo, Burnt Project, Don Amero, Al Simmons, Carly Dow Band, and Scott Nolan Band.

- DUKE Fest

DUKE Fest is a music festival held annually in Rossburn, Manitoba since 2014. It has featured musicians such as Ryan Keown Band, Jake Boreskewich, Sonny and the Hurricanes, In Too Deep, and Tom Dowden.

- Manitoba Maple Syrup Festival

This winter festival, held annually in McCreary, Manitoba since 2013, is based out of McCreary Community Centre and McCreary Golf and Country Cub as of 2016. Events held in the municipality include a Maple Syrup trivia night, performances by local musicians, horse-drawn wagon rides, and sampling of maple taffy.

- Dauphin's Countryfest

Held for over 30 years each Canada Day long weekend, Dauphin's Countryfest is Canada's longest running country music festival with over 15,000 attendees on-site and up to 45,000 visitors over the 4 day event. The festival has featured world famous acts including the Zach Brown Band, Terri Clark, and Toby Keith.

== Recreation ==
- Riding Mountain Trans Canada Trail Network
  - Onanole Trail The Onanole Trail, opened after three years of planning, links the town of Onanole in the Rural Municipality of Harrison Park to the town site of Wasagaming in Riding Mountain National Park. The multi-use trail is five kilometres, and can be accessed by cyclists and pedestrians during the summer, and skiers and snowshoers during the winter. The trail covers both private and public land.
  - Elk Link Recreation Trail The Elk Link Recreation Trail, which opened on Friday, July 31, 2015, links Elk Park in Onanole, Manitoba to the town of Erickson, Manitoba. Animals such as moose, bears, elk, squirrels, and coyotes can be seen on the trail.”
- Trans Canada Trail Network The non-profit Trans Canada Trail organization is constructing a recreation trail that reaches both the West Coast and East Coast of Canada. The segment of the Trail in Riding Mountain Biosphere Reserve, over 175 kilometers in length, connects the towns of Russell, Manitoba and Neepawa, Manitoba, and runs parallel to Riding Mountain National Park, at varying distances. It also connects to the Elk Link Recreation Trail in Erickson, Manitoba.” The two trails meets at the junctions of Highways 45 & 10.
- Curling There are curling clubs in Dauphin, Gilbert Plains, Grandview, Newdale, Russell, and Shoal Lake, registered as members of CurlManitoba.
- Golf There are golf clubs in Dauphin, Gilbert Plains, and Russell, registered as members of Golf Manitoba.

== See also ==
- Biosphere Reserves of Canada
- Riding Mountain National Park

== Sources ==
This article incorporates text from a free content work (license statement/permission). Text taken from UNESCO - MAB Biosphere Reserves Directory, UNESCO, UNESCO.
