= Riding Mountain Park East Gate Registration Complex =

Coordinates: 50°40′58″N 99°33′20″W

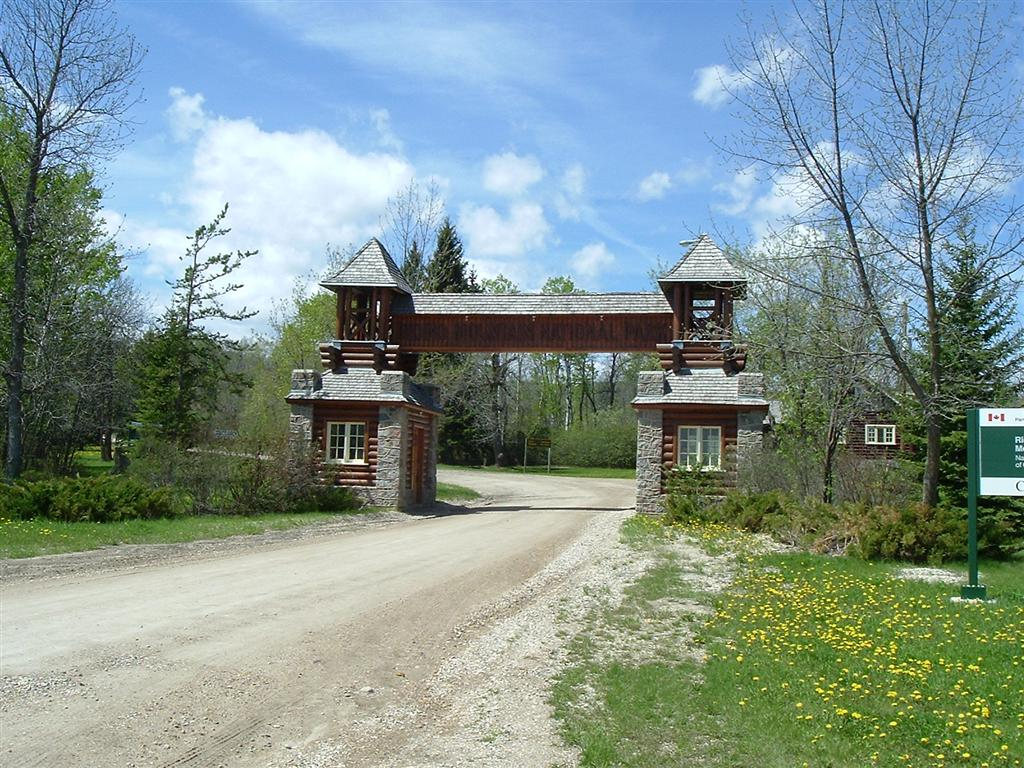
- East Entrance Gate
- Location: Riding Mountain National Park, Manitoba
- Built: 1933
- Architectural style: Rustic
- Governing body: Parks Canada
- Website: National Historic Site page

National Historic Site of Canada
- Designated: 1992

The Riding Mountain Park East Gate Registration Complex north of Brandon, Manitoba, is the only surviving gate structure of the three built at the entrances to Canada's Riding Mountain National Park. Three gate complexes were built: the South Entrance (1931), the East Entrance (1933) and the North Entrance (1936), in the rustic style prevailing at the time in North American national parks.

The main entrance gate, located along PTH 19, comprises two log and stone pavilions, one on each side of the road, topped by cupolas from which a roofed sign spans the highway between them. The construction of the gate and what was then called Norgate Road was carried out by local workers hired through the government's Depression Relief Program. Besides the gate structure, the designated area includes the Whirlpool Warden's Station and a gatekeeper's residence. Entry into the park at this gate is from the Rural Municipality of McCreary.

The complex was designated a National Historic Site in 1992.
