= Riding Mountain House =

- Village
- Location of Riding Mountain House in Manitoba
- Coordinates: 50.644355°N 99.986737°W
- Country: Canada
- Province: Manitoba
- Region: Westman
- Time zone: UTC-6 (Central (CST))
  - Summer (DST): UTC-5 (Central (CDT))

Riding Mountain House was a Hudson's Bay Company trading post set up to the south of what is now the Riding Mountain National Park, on the Little Saskatchewan River. It was built in 1860 and maintained until 1895, by which time there was little remaining trade in furs. It was near modern-day Elphinstone, Manitoba.

The Hudson's Bay Company established the post for the purpose of trading with the Ojibwe people led by Chief Okanase and then by Chief Keeseekoowenin. The Keeseekooweenin First Nation owns the reserve where Riding Mountain House once stood. In 1875, the band was offered the choice of staying at Riding Mountain House or moving to Dauphin Lake, with fourteen heads of families voting to stay and nine to move to Dauphin Lake. The advantage of Dauphin Lake was that it had better hunting and fishing, and was more isolated from European settlement. However, those who wanted to stay had built houses, cleared and fenced land and were raising good crops of potatoes, wheat, barley and garden vegetables. A Presbyterian Mission under the Rev. George Flett was set up nearby.

The trading post lies on or very near to land currently owned by the Nature Conservancy of Canada.
