= Knox Presbyterian Church (Oakville, Ontario) =

Coordinates: 43.4464°N 79.6666°W

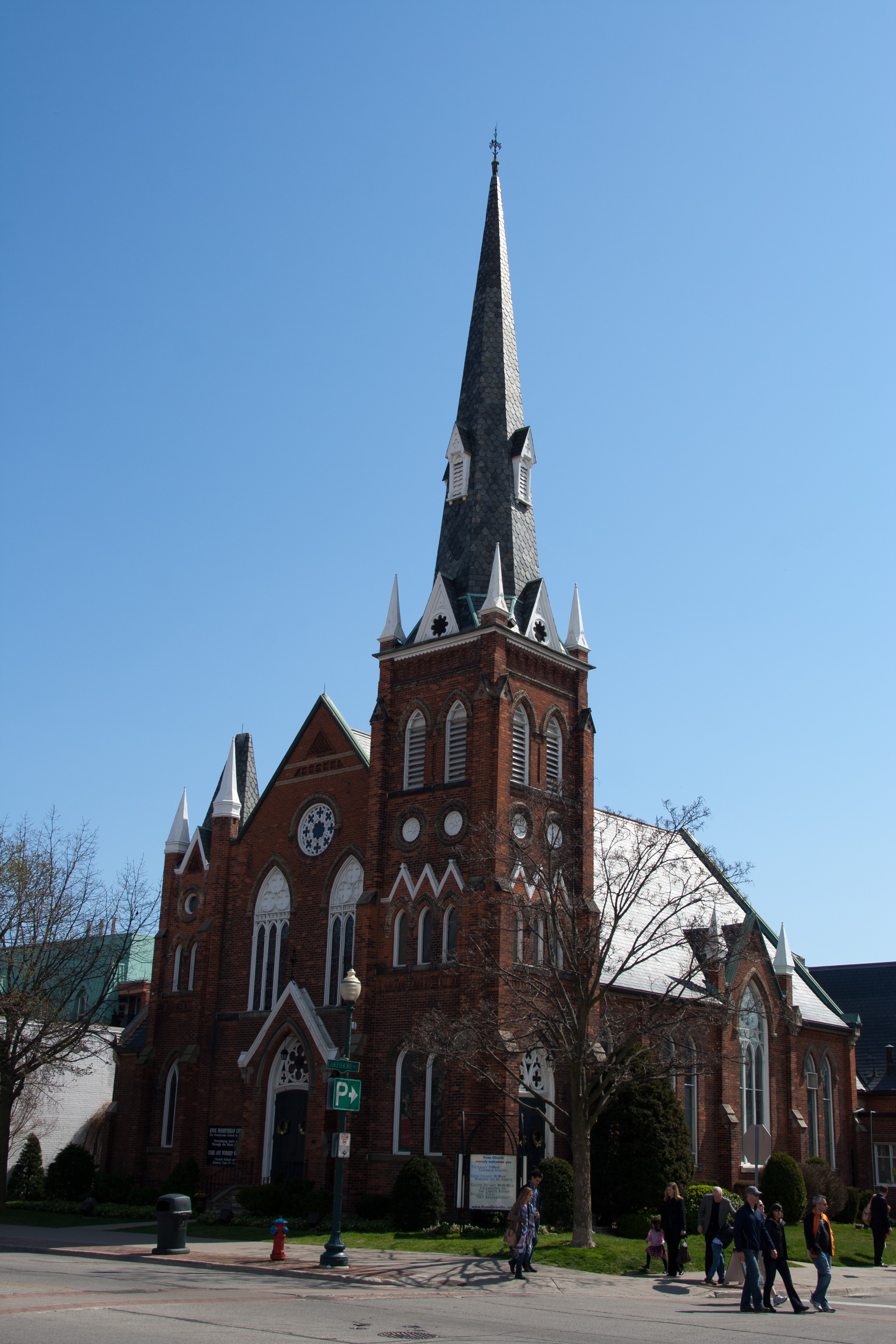

- Location within Southern Ontario
- Location: 89 Dunn Street; Oakville, Ontario; L6J 3C8
- Country: Canada
- Denomination: Presbyterian
- Website: knoxoakville.com

History
- Former name: Oakville Presbyterian Church
- Founded: 1833

Knox Presbyterian Church, Oakville is a Presbyterian Church in Canada congregation, and located at 89 Dunn Street at Lakeshore Road (Highway 2) in downtown Oakville, Ontario, Canada.

== Overview ==
The church was created in 1833 by Americans and Scottish Presbyterians. After the 1837 Rebellion the influence of the American church faded and was replaced by the rise of the Scotch Kirk (Free Church of Scotland) and the Church of Scotland took over until 1844. James Nisbet became the first settled minister and remained until 1862, when he was appointed as a missionary, first to the Red River Colony, and later to Prince Albert, Saskatchewan. From 1844 to 1883, it was linked with Knox Church "Sixteen", whose building was upstream at Dundas Street. The congregation voted to remain Presbyterian in 1925.

== Name ==
Originally named Oakville Presbyterian Church, or The Presbyterian Church, Oakville. In 1888 the building was renamed Knox after John Knox.

== History ==
Knox Presbyterian Church Oakville began with a simple service in 1833 attended by 11 worshippers in a wooden frame building on the east bank of the 16 Mile Creek. The settlement, on land surrendered by the Mississauga Indians, was in the midst of the last great virgin forest remaining between York and Hamilton Bay. Early services in the pioneer shipbuilding port, with its nearby stands of highly prized white oak trees, were held in such places as a cabinet maker's shop. This led in 1850 to the building of a white framed church on William Street.

The current red-brick Gothic style building was dedicated May 20, 1888. It replaced the old frame church, called Oakville Presbyterian Church. The new church had taken a year to build and cost $16,000, a huge amount in those days. To build it, 60 members of the congregation signed a promissory note and the church purchased the White Oak Hotel at the corner of Dunn Street and Colborne Street, later to become Lakeshore Road. The hotel had once been a wild drinking place called O'Reilly's Tavern and a later owner took to keeping a live bear chained up to amuse customers; Oakville residents voted the town dry in 1881 and by 1887 the owner was willing to sell it to the Presbyterians for $1,600. The old hotel was cut into three sections and moved off the site - one section is still downtown today at 152 Lakeshore Road. A church bell was installed several years later - the exact date is in dispute - cast in New York State. By 1894, a "pedal organ" had been approved, to the consternation of the more conservative members of the church who regarded it as "the devil's instrument."

By 1919, the church was ready to expand again, and the sanctuary was renovated to assume the form that exists today. The old organ was replaced with a new $6,625 three-manual Casavant Organ, the chancel was extended through the arch and the stained glass window of the Last Supper was installed in memory of the men in the congregation who died in the Great War, including the son of the minister. The window was donated by Cecil Marlatt, owner of a great family tannery, who died 8 years later bankrupt. These renovations, which cost $20,300, also saw the addition of what is now R.G. MacMillan Hall. The 1925 Union crisis and the creation of the United Church of Canada, along with the Great Depression, brought about a period of hard times for the church and it wasn't until 1949 that the congregation could hold a mortgage-burning ceremony.

In 1955 the boom following the arrival of the Ford Motor Company was being felt and the church expanded again. Completed in 1956, the new section along Dunn Street now includes the parlour the library, counting room, office, and the nursery. In 1965, a hall was built under the church at a cost of $80,000, to provide additional space for the church school. It was named for C.K. McNicoll, the minister who guided Knox from its centennial in 1933 to 1961.

== Ministers ==
- Edwards Marsh (American) 1833
- Samuel Sessions (American) 1834-1835
- Joseph Marr (American) 1835-1837
- Robert Murray (Church of Scotland) 1836-1862
- James Nisbet (Free Church-Canada Presbyterian Church) 1850-1862
- Robert Scott (CPC) 1863-1867
- William Meikle (CPC, Presbyterian Church in Canada) 1867-1890
- S.S. Craig 1890-1898
- John McNair 1899-1909
- James E. Munro (Minister left to join United Church of Canada) 1909-1925
- William Wallis 1925-1927
- J. F. Weddereburn 1927-1932
- C.K. Nichol 1933-1961
- Robert G. MacMillan 1961-1975
- Helen Goggin (Deaconess, Assistant Minister, became professor at Ewart College) 1965-1984
- R. Cam Taylor 1976-1984
- Harry McWilliams 1985-2006
- Michael J. Marsden 2001-2015
- Jacquelyn C. C. B. Foxall 2009-present
