= Riding Mountain National Park Film Festival =

Canadian film festival

- Location: Riding Mountain National Park, Wasagaming, Manitoba, Canada
- Started: 2012
- Website: rmnpfilmfest.ca

Riding Mountain National Park Film Festival is a Canadian film festival held in Wasagaming, Manitoba, inside Riding Mountain National Park. Held in July each year, the event screens both short and feature films, concentrating especially on themes of environmentalism, agriculture, food and regional films from Canada's Prairie provinces.

Founded by Manitoba filmmaker and activist Steve Langston, the event was staged for the first time in 2012.
