= Lucy Margaret Baker =

Baker, Lucy Margaret

Personal details
- Born: 1836
- Died: 30 May 1909 (aged 72–73)
- Profession: Teacher, missionary

Lucy Baker (1836 – 30 May 1909) was the first female teacher and missionary in present-day Prince Albert, Saskatchewan in Canada. She pioneered the development of the western Canadian settlement.

== Life and career ==
Baker was born in Summertown, Glengarry County, Ontario, and raised from a young age by her aunt. She became a teacher shortly after finishing school in Fort Covington, New York.

Her teaching career was as varied as it was wide-ranging. She first worked in Dundee, then held classes in New Jersey for a women's school. She moved to New Orleans not long afterwards to co-own another women's school just before the American Civil War. In 1878, she returned to Glengarry County to teach a private school.

In 1879, minister Donald Ross asked Baker to teach at a missionary school in Prince Albert, on behalf of the Presbyterian church. She accepted the offer, and trekked cross-country to arrive at the western territory in 1879. She earned a permanent teaching grant at the mission school in 1880.

In 1890, Baker relocated to the Makoce Washte reserves in present-day South Dakota, where she served as chief instructor at a school for Sioux refugees. She learned to speak Sioux, and regularly spoke Mass in the refugees' native language. She remained teaching at Makoce Washte until her retirement in 1905.
