= James Isbister =

Canadian politician (1833–1915)

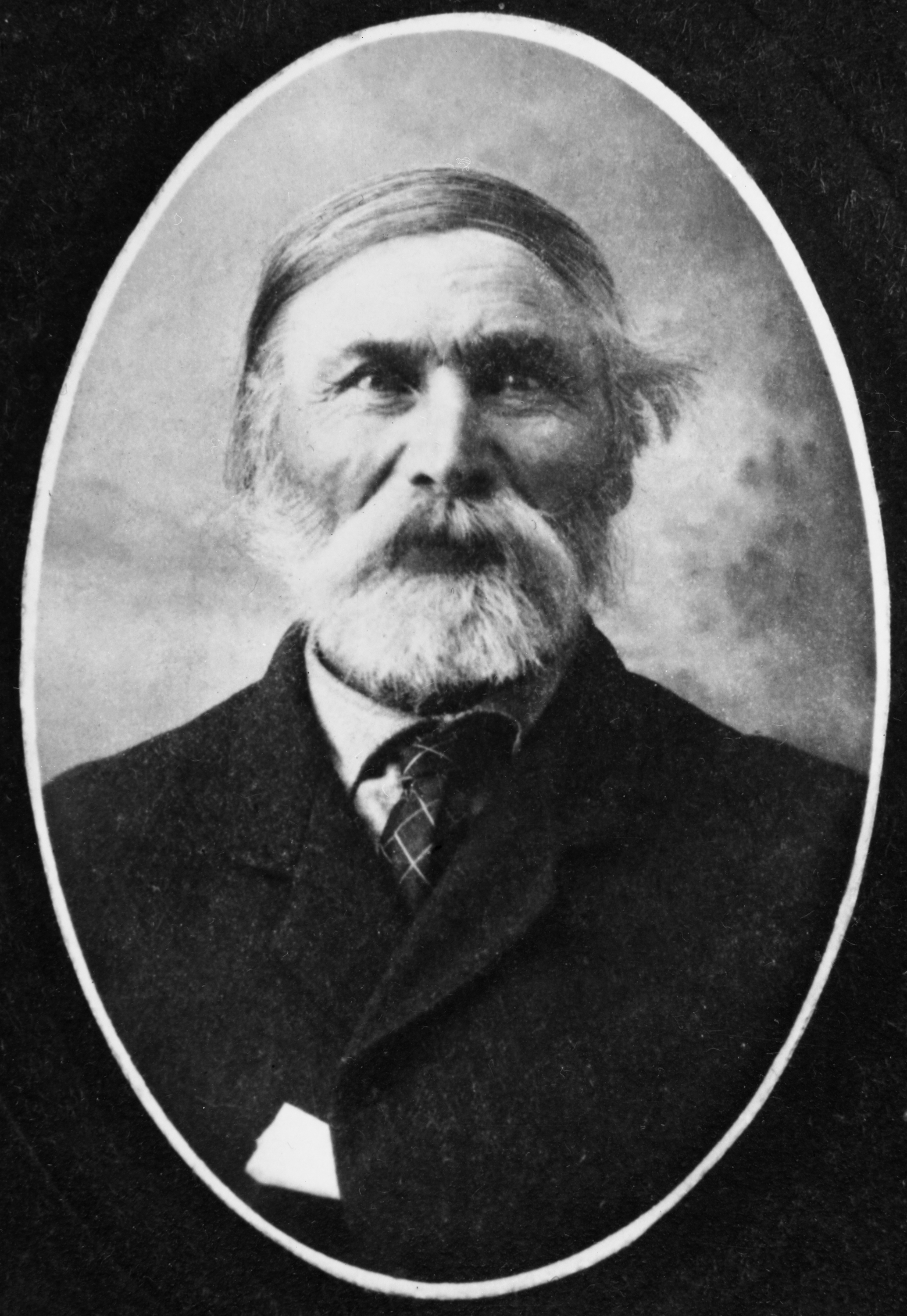
James Isbister, Canadian Metis leader, founder of Prince Albert, Saskatchewan

James Isbister (November 29, 1833 – October 16, 1915) was a Canadian Métis leader of the 19th century. Prominent among the Anglo-Métis of the area, he is considered to be the founder of the city of Prince Albert, Saskatchewan.

== Life ==
An interpreter for the Hudson's Bay Company for many years, Isbister was talented linguistically, speaking English, Gaelic, Cree, Dene, and Michif.

Isbister began farming in the summer of 1862 one mile east of the present day federal penitentiary at Prince Albert. The area he farmed is close to present day 17 Avenue and 14 Street West. Isbister was probably the first man in what is now known as Saskatchewan to grow wheat on his own farm. He also worked on the John Smith Reserve (currently the Muskoday First Nation) as a farm instructor. By 1866, when Isbister moved a short distance away, several families were living in the district, which was known as Isbister's Settlement.

By 1884, both settler and Métis discontent was growing rapidly due to poor agricultural conditions and unresolved land issues in the Saskatchewan Valley region. As a community leader, Isbister was selected as one of the four delegates (along with Gabriel Dumont) sent to recall Louis Riel from Montana to lead the people in seeking government action to address the situation. Local settlers' perception of government inaction culminated in the North-West Rebellion of the following year (1885).

Like most other Anglo-Métis of the area, Isbister disassociated himself from the movement led by Riel when tensions ultimately erupted into violence. Despite this, he was denounced by the Conservative press in Prince Albert.

Following the North-West Rebellion, Isbister was active in the Anglican Church of Canada in the Prince Albert area, and lived out his last days in that community. He is buried in the Anglican St. Mary's Cemetery just west of the Penitentiary not far from where he farmed initially.

== See also ==
- Gabriel Dumont (Métis leader)
- James Nisbet
- Lawrence Clarke
- Thomas McKay (N.W.T. politician)
- Louis Riel
- Prince Albert, Saskatchewan
- North-West Rebellion
