= Makoce Washte =

Coordinates: 43°33′10″N 96°58′3″W

Makoce Washte is a 40-acre plot of native prairie owned by The Nature Conservancy about 10 miles west of Sioux Falls, South Dakota. The name means 'Beautiful Earth'.
