= Wasagaming =

Coordinates: 50°39′30″N 99°58′07″W

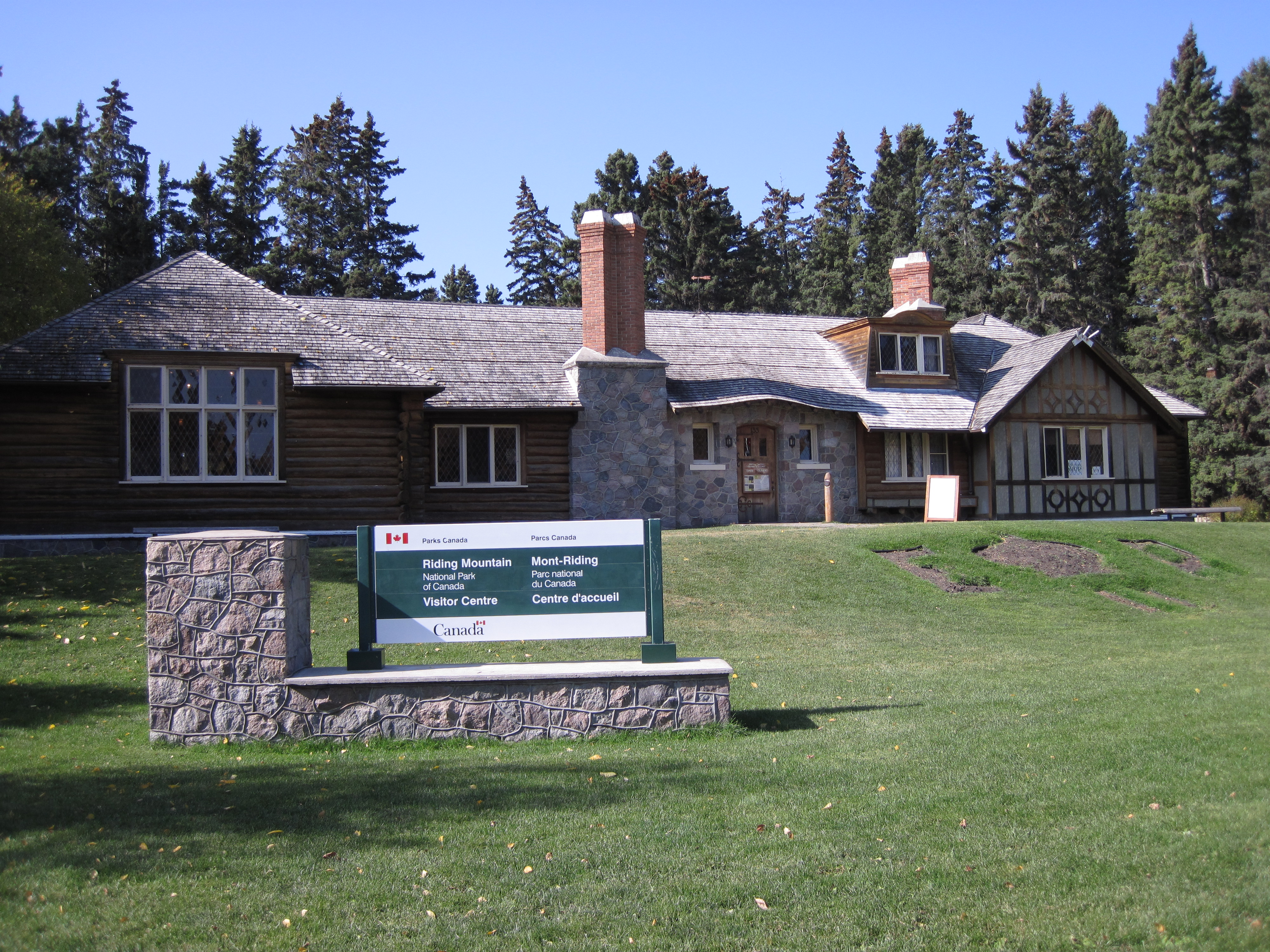
- The Parks Canada Interpretive Centre in Wasagaming.
- Interactive map of Wasagaming
- Country: Canada
- Province: Manitoba
- Region: Riding Mountain National Park
- Established: 1933 (National Parks of Canada)

Government
  - Administration: Parks Canada
- Elevation: 626 m (2,054 ft)

Population (2011)
  - Total: 33
- Time zone: UTC−06:00 (CST)
  - Summer (DST): UTC−05:00 (CDT)
- Postal code: R0J
- Area codes: 204 & 431

Wasagaming (also known as Clear Lake) is the main townsite in the popular tourist destination Riding Mountain National Park in Manitoba, Canada. It is located at the south gate of Riding Mountain National Park along Highway 10. This townsite is 99 kilometres (62 mi) north of Brandon. It lies on the south shores of Clear Lake which is the largest lake in Riding Mountain National Park.

== Overview ==
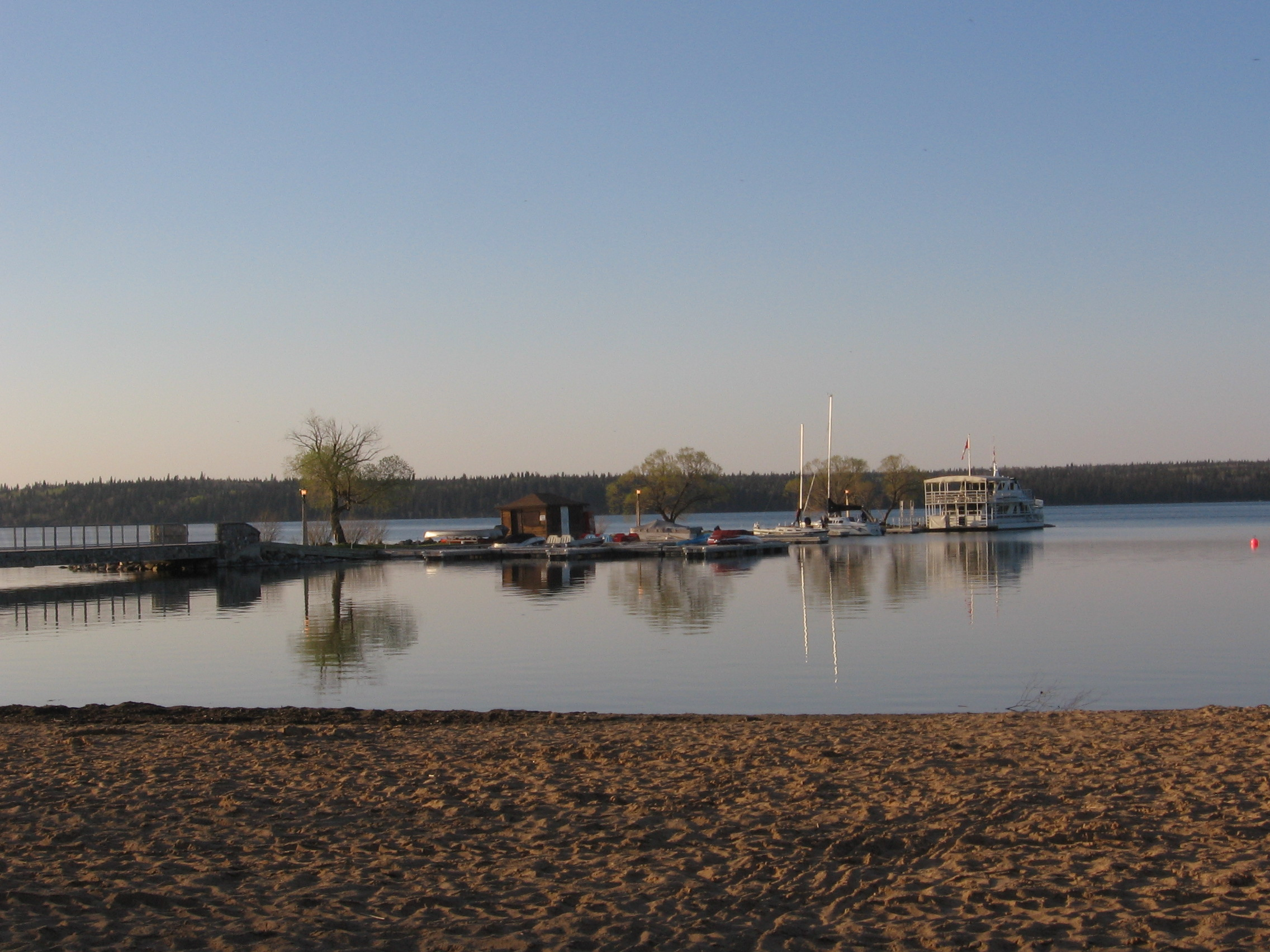
Clear Lake Main Beach

Wasagaming is an unincorporated townsite. Because it is located within a National Park, the population is seasonal and fluctuates drastically throughout the year. The only permanent year-round residents are mostly Parks Canada employees and their family members.

During the summer season, which generally runs from 18 May to 8 October, Riding Mountain National Park is a very popular tourist destination and in the past has seen well over 300,000 visitors in a season. In Wasagaming there are many restaurants, hotels, and other businesses and services which cater to the high number of visitors. There is a large, full service campground as well as 525 private cabins and 254 private cottages, almost all of which are only used in the summer months. Including the many cottage and cabin areas located outside of the National Park directly adjacent to park boundaries, the Wasagaming area is home to roughly 40,000 cottagers during the summer.

The community is also home to the annual Riding Mountain National Park Film Festival.

Wasagaming is the only commercial centre within the Riding Mountain National Park boundaries, and all Parks Canada offices are located there.

== Demographics ==
In 2011, Wasagaming had a population of 33 year-round residents.

== Climate ==
Wasagaming has a subarctic climate (Dfc) due to its northerly location and high elevation. Winters are extremely cold and relatively dry with little chance of a mid-winter thaw. The average annual temperature is 0.7 °C (33.3 °F). Annual precipitation is 488 mm (19.2 in).

Climate data for Wasagaming
Month	Jan	Feb	Mar	Apr	May	Jun	Jul	Aug	Sep	Oct	Nov	Dec	Year
Record high °C (°F)	6.7 (44.1)	10.1 (50.2)	15.6 (60.1)	33.3 (91.9)	35.6 (96.1)	34.0 (93.2)	36.1 (97.0)	36.5 (97.7)	35.6 (96.1)	25.6 (78.1)	18.9 (66.0)	8.1 (46.6)	36.5 (97.7)
Mean daily maximum °C (°F)	−10.9 (12.4)	−7.1 (19.2)	−1.3 (29.7)	8.9 (48.0)	15.6 (60.1)	20.2 (68.4)	23.9 (75.0)	22.7 (72.9)	16.1 (61.0)	8.4 (47.1)	−1.8 (28.8)	−8.2 (17.2)	7.2 (45.0)
Daily mean °C (°F)	−17.5 (0.5)	−14.1 (6.6)	−8.1 (17.4)	1.9 (35.4)	8.5 (47.3)	13.6 (56.5)	17.0 (62.6)	15.6 (60.1)	9.6 (49.3)	2.7 (36.9)	−6.9 (19.6)	−14.2 (6.4)	0.7 (33.3)
Mean daily minimum °C (°F)	−24.1 (−11.4)	−21.0 (−5.8)	−14.9 (5.2)	−5.2 (22.6)	1.3 (34.3)	6.9 (44.4)	10.0 (50.0)	8.5 (47.3)	3.0 (37.4)	−3.1 (26.4)	−12.0 (10.4)	−20.1 (−4.2)	−5.9 (21.4)
Record low °C (°F)	−46.4 (−51.5)	−47.6 (−53.7)	−41.7 (−43.1)	−32.2 (−26.0)	−16.0 (3.2)	−8.0 (17.6)	−2.8 (27.0)	−3.5 (25.7)	−11.7 (10.9)	−22.0 (−7.6)	−41.0 (−41.8)	−47.8 (−54.0)	−47.8 (−54.0)
Average precipitation mm (inches)	18.6 (0.73)	15.7 (0.62)	28.6 (1.13)	25.0 (0.98)	57.4 (2.26)	80.1 (3.15)	66.7 (2.63)	59.2 (2.33)	51.7 (2.04)	38.7 (1.52)	26.0 (1.02)	20.3 (0.80)	488.0 (19.21)
Average rainfall mm (inches)	0.1 (0.00)	0.2 (0.01)	7.5 (0.30)	15.1 (0.59)	55.5 (2.19)	80.1 (3.15)	66.7 (2.63)	59.2 (2.33)	50.8 (2.00)	32.3 (1.27)	4.6 (0.18)	0.0 (0.0)	372.1 (14.65)
Average snowfall cm (inches)	19.0 (7.5)	15.2 (6.0)	21.0 (8.3)	9.6 (3.8)	1.6 (0.6)	0.0 (0.0)	0.0 (0.0)	0.0 (0.0)	0.9 (0.4)	6.5 (2.6)	21.5 (8.5)	20.0 (7.9)	115.2 (45.4)
Source: Environment Canada
