= Keeseekoowenin Ojibway First Nation =

Keeseekoowenin 61
- Indian reserve
- Indian Reserve 61
- Location of Keeseekoowenin Ojibway First Nation in Manitoba
- Coordinates: 50.552598°N 100.301743°W
- Country: Canada
- Province: Manitoba
- Region: Westman

Area
  - Land: 57.2 km^{2} (22.08 sq mi)

Population (2016)
  - Total: 386
  - Density: 17.5/km^{2} (45/sq mi)
- Time zone: UTC-6 (Central (CST))
  - Summer (DST): UTC-5 (Central (CDT))
- Keeseekoowenin Ojibway First Nation
- Giizhigowininiing
- People: Anishinabe / Ojibway
- Treaty: Treaty 2
- Province: Manitoba

Land
- Main reserve: Keeseekoowenin 61
- Reserves: IR 61A and IR 61B

Tribal Council
- West Region Tribal Council

Website
- keeseekoowenin.ca

Keeseekoowenin Ojibway First Nation (KOFN; also known as Riding Mountain Band, Ojibwe: Giizhigowininiing) is a First Nations community primarily located on Keeseekoowenin 61 (Indian Reserve 61A), situated near Elphinstone, Manitoba, south of Riding Mountain National Park.

The reserve is surrounded by territory of the Rural Municipality of Yellowhead, in whose northeastern portion it lies. The KOFN also two smaller reserves: IR 61A, which is located within Riding Mountain National Park, on the northwest shore of Clear Lake; and IR 61B, which is located between the two other reserves by Bottle Lake.

== Origins ==
The reserve was established around Riding Mountain House, a trading post of the Hudson's Bay Company that operated from 1860 until 1895. The Keeseekoowenin Ojibway, also known as Riding Mountain Band, signed Treaty 2 with the Government of Canada on 21 August 1871.

The group takes their name from Keeseekoowenin, who was Chief when they moved to the reserve in 1875.

In 1935, the Sovereign Okanase Indian Nation, known as the Clear Water Lake Indian Tribe, were burned out of the Clear Water Lake Indian Territory of current-day Riding Mountain National Park and relocated within the Indian Reserve (IR) 61. In 1994, a land claim settlement awarded Keeseekoowenin Ojibway First Nation the IR 61A to the location on the boundaries of the National Park.

== Reserves ==
The Keeseekoowenin Ojibway First Nation has 3 separate reserve lands.

The main reserve, Keeseekoowenin 61 (IR 61A), is situated south of Riding Mountain National Park, in a valley setting with the Little Saskatchewan River flowing through it. The second reserve (IR 61A) is located within the park, on the northwest shore of Clear Lake. The third, called Bottle Lake 61B, is located in between the two other reserves.
