= Riding Mountain National Park =

National park in Manitoba, Canada

- Parc national du Mont-Riding
- IUCN category II (national park)
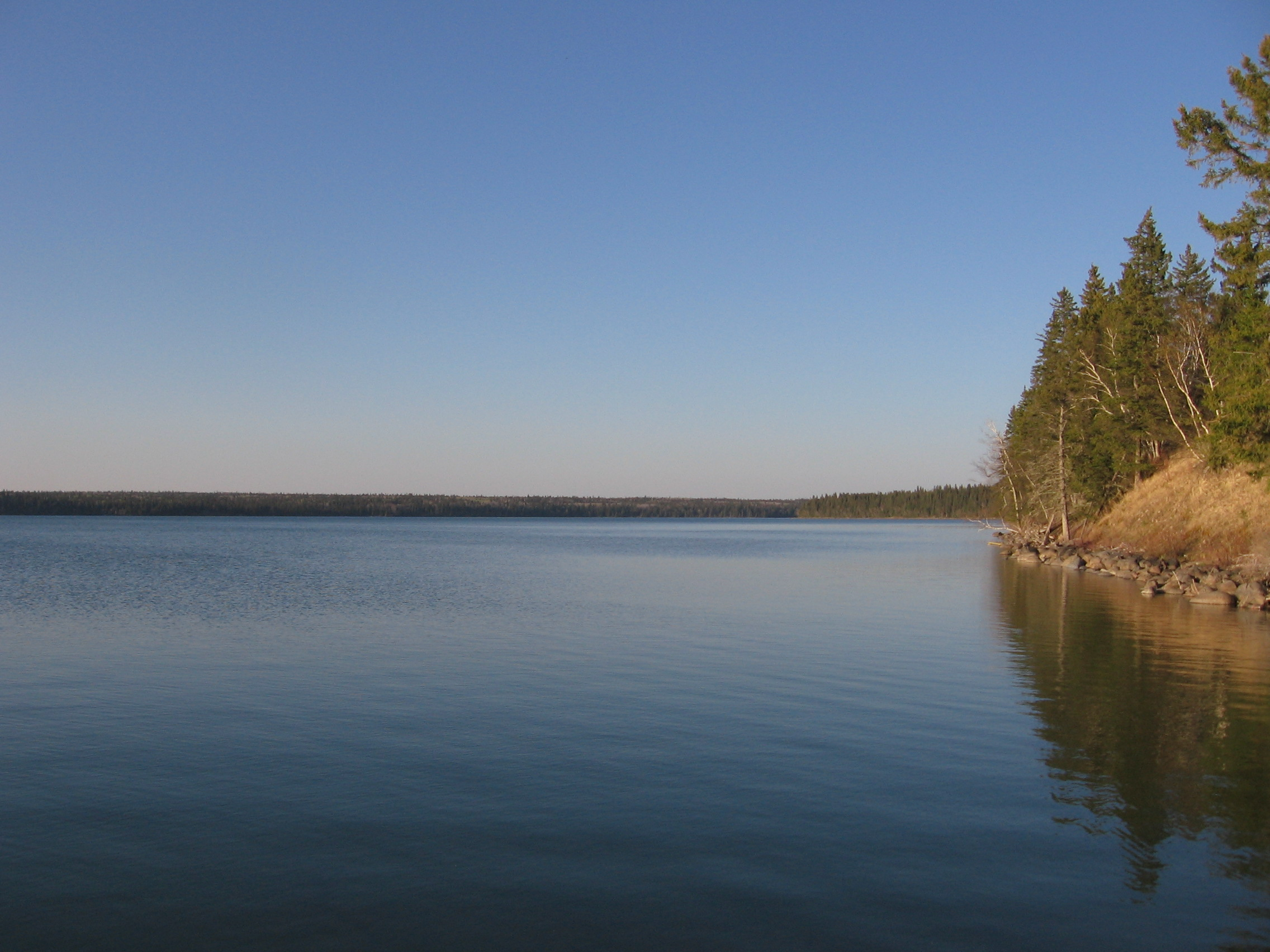
- Clear Lake, Riding Mountain National Park

- Location within Canada Location within Manitoba
- Interactive map of Riding Mountain National Park
- Location: Manitoba, Canada
- Nearest city: Dauphin
- Coordinates: 50°51′50″N 100°02′10″W
- Area: 2,969 km^{2} (1,146 sq mi)
- Established: 1933 (National park); 1986 (Biosphere reserve)
- Visitors: 336,560 (in 2022–23)
- Governing body: Parks Canada

Riding Mountain National Park is a national park in Manitoba, Canada, that sits atop Riding Mountain of the Manitoba Escarpment. Consisting of a protected area of 2,969 km^{2} (1,146 sq mi), the forested parkland stands in sharp contrast to the surrounding prairie farmland. It was designated a national park because it protects three different ecosystems that converge in the area; grasslands, upland boreal and eastern deciduous forests. It is most easily reached by Highway 10 which passes through the park. The south entrance is at the townsite of Wasagaming, which is the only commercial centre within the park boundaries.

== History ==
=== Indigenous peoples ===
For several thousand years, First Nations peoples have lived in the region. It has been home to the Cree, the Assiniboines, and later to the Ojibwe, the latter of whom still live in the area today.

The Okanese Band, now called the Keeseekoowenin Ojibway First Nation, lived in the area around Wasagaming, in the valley of the Little Saskatchewan River. The band hunted and fished on the land surrounding Clear Lake. They also used the land south-west of the mountain for the buffalo chase and making of pemmican.

The park is located within Treaty 2 Territory.

=== Fur trade and European explorers ===
A trading post was first established on Lake Dauphin north of present-day Riding Mountain National Park by the Hudson Bay Company in 1741. Pierre de la Verendrye and sons explored the region and traded with First Nations, who hunted and fished in the area for many years. The Ojibway participated in the fur trade at Riding Mountain House and Fort Ellice. The Hudson's Bay Company established Riding Mountain House for trading with the Ojibwe people led by Chief Okanase and then by Chief Keeseekoowenin. After Chief Okanese's death in 1870, his son Mekis became chief. In 1871, Mekis signed Treaty Number 2.

In 1858 Henry Youle Hind, a professor of biology and chemistry at the University of Toronto, became one of the first Canadian explorers to reach the area now encompassed by Riding Mountain National Park during his surveying of present-day Manitoba and Saskatchewan, with the aid of several assistants and First Nations peoples.

=== Park creation ===
In 1895, 3,975 square kilometres (1,535 mi^{2}) of land in Riding Mountain was designated as a timber reserve by the Department of the Interior. The Dominion Forest Reserve Act, passed in 1906, and the Dominion Forest Reserve and Parks Act, passed in 1911, were among the first legally binding protection of the area. In 1906 the superintendent of forestry monitored permits for cutting timber, which were issued only to settlers of the region.

On October 27, 1927, a meeting of representatives from the surrounding communities were called to the Court House in Neepawa, Manitoba to discuss a proposal to designate the Riding Mountain Forest Reserve a national park. Led by J. N. McFadden, the meeting aimed to highlight to residents the differences between a forest reserve and national park. Although some wanted a national park to be located in the Whiteshell, a majority voted in favour of locating it in Riding Mountain. As a consequence of designating the area a national park, logging operations were halted.

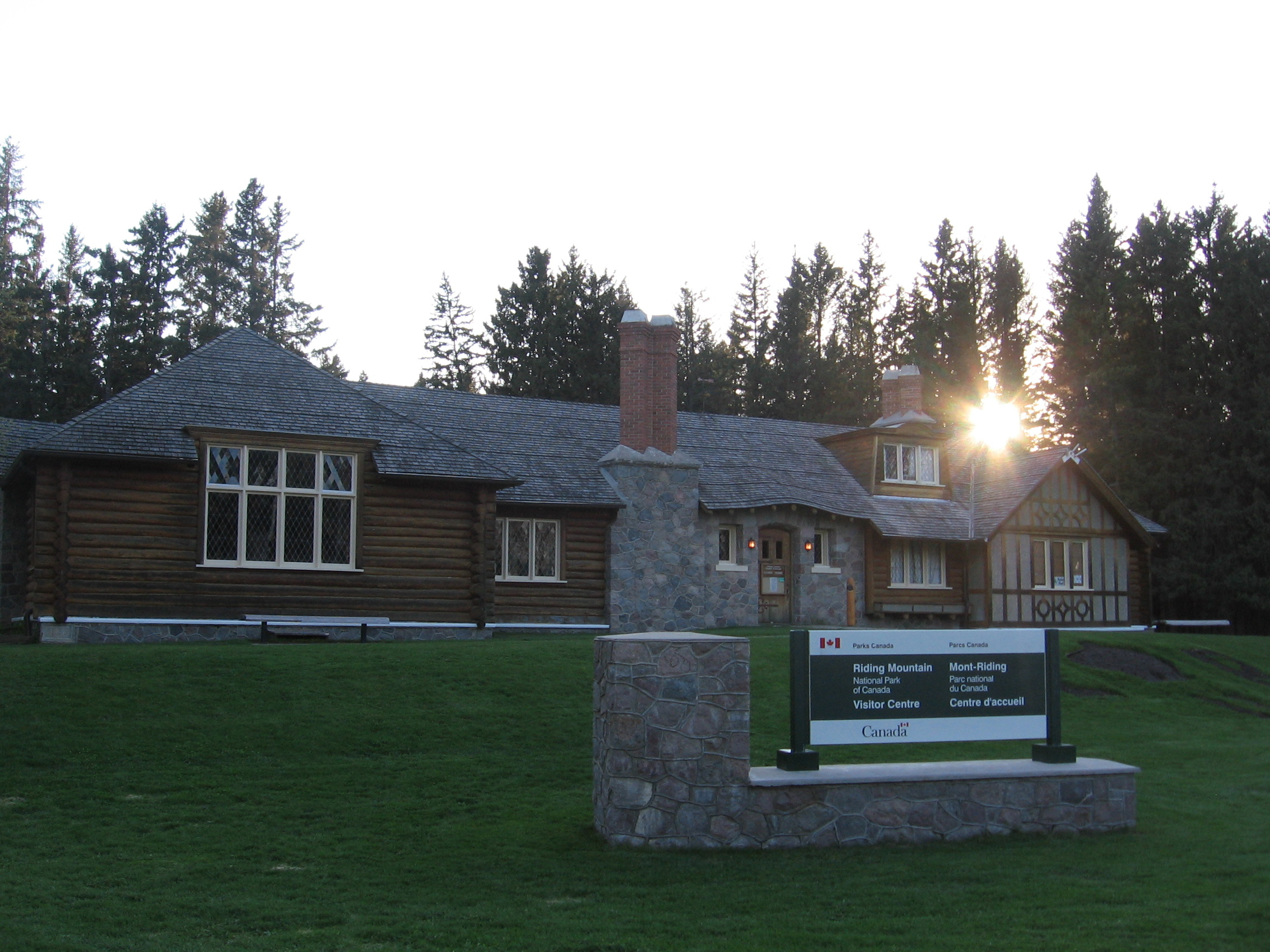
Riding Mountain National Park Interpretive Centre in Wasagaming, built in 1933.

The forest reserve was set aside as a national park in 1929, officially declared Riding Mountain National Park on May 30, 1933. The park opened to visitors on July 26 of that year, with Manitoba Lieutenant-Governor James D. McGregor unveiling a cairn and giving a speech at a dedication ceremony. In attendance were Manitoba Premier John Bracken, Minister of Natural Resources J. S. McDiarmid, and Thomas G. Murphy, Minister of the Interior. The Clear Lake site was designated Wasagaming. Much of the public infrastructure in Riding Mountain National Park was created during the 1930s by labourers participating in Canada's Great Depression relief programs. Ten relief camps were supervised by James Wardle. Funding for these relief programs was provided by the 1930 Unemployment Relief Act and the 1934 Public Works Construction Act. In 1932 most relief workers were British and over half were from Winnipeg. At this time the 1 1/2-storey interpretive centre and several other buildings were built of log, many featuring a rustic architectural style. A lot of this early construction survives.

In 1936, the Keeseekoowenin Ojibway Band was forced to leave the park area. The Department of Indian Affairs agreed because living in the rich wilderness was contrary to its concept of assimilation through farm labor. The Keeseekoowenin were forced to watch as park employees burned their homes.

=== Grey Owl ===
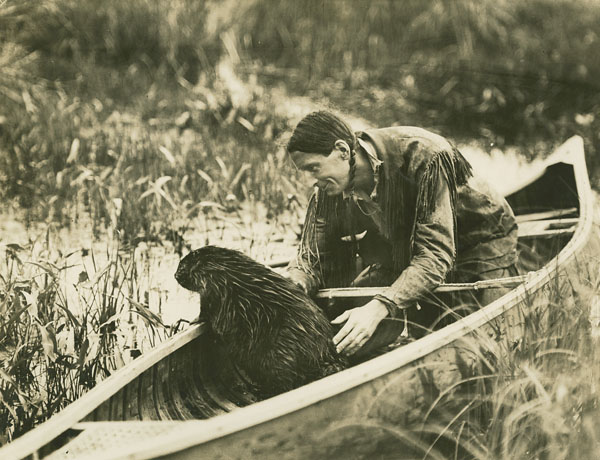
Grey Owl in a canoe

In the early days of Riding Mountain National Park, Parks Branch Commissioner James Harkin offered Archibald Belaney (September 18, 1888 – April 13, 1938) a job in the region. Belaney, who adopted the name Grey Owl when he took upon a First Nations identity as an adult, was a writer and became one of Canada's first conservationists. On April 17, 1931, Grey Owl arrived with his two beavers at a secluded lake several kilometres north of Wasagaming which had been selected by the park staff. He spent six months living in a cabin in Riding Mountain National park studying and working with wildlife, including two beavers named Jelly Roll and Rawhide. His main goal in the park was to re-establish beaver colonies in areas where they were exterminated. Riding Mountain National Park was found to be an unsuitable habitat for the beavers, as a summer drought resulted in the lake water level sinking, and becoming stagnant. Both the beavers and Belaney were unhappy with the situation, causing Belaney to search, with the support of the Dominion Parks Branch, for better living conditions. He later relocated to Prince Albert National Park, where there was a greater sized waterway and a lower risk of the lakes freezing to the bottom in the winter. Despite his eventual departure, the park now has an abundant beaver population partially because of his efforts. His former living quarters, now known as "Grey Owl's Cabin", are reachable via a park trail.

=== Whitewater POW camp ===
During World War II Riding Mountain National Park was home to the Whitewater labour camp for German prisoners-of-war. Operating from 1943 to 1945, the camp was built on the northeast shore of Whitewater Lake, approximately 300 kilometres (190 mi) north-west of Winnipeg. The camp consisted of fifteen buildings and housed 440 to 450 prisoners of war. The decision to have a prisoner of war labour project in Riding Mountain National Park was the result of a fuelwood shortage in the winter of 1942 and 1943. To free up men for the war effort it was decided that prisoners of war would be employed. Following the end of the war and the achievement of a fuelwood surplus, the camp closed in late 1945. In 1945 an advertisement appeared in the Tribune soliciting the sale of the government-owned buildings. The camp has since been dismantled.

=== Land claims settlement ===
In 1896, land adjacent to Clear Lake known as IR 61A was given to the Keeseekoowenin Ojibway First Nation by the Canadian government to protect from encroaching settlement. In 1935, this land was expropriated by the government for the creation of the park. The government evicted Ojibway who were living on the land from within the park boundary and forcibly removed them to the main reserve, IR 61, which was outside of the park boundary. In the Report On The Mediation Of The Keeseekoowenin First Nation 1906 Land Claim Negotiation a study by Stuart Davies of North/South Consultants Inc. is referenced to describe the experience of elders who were evicted. Elders accounts stated that their houses were burnt to the ground and that undue force was used during the eviction. Davies noted that "Several Elders stated that one woman died of a heart attack during the eviction". In 1994 after the resolution of a specific land claim with The Department of Indian and Northern Affairs Canada, the land was returned to the Keeseekoowenin First Nation and a settlement of $4.9 million dollars was made under the Specific Claims Policy.

In a separate claim case, the construction of a rail line in 1904 through the main reserve, IR 61, by Canadian National (CN), permanently cut off a section of land from IR 61. The First Nation voluntarily surrendered this portion of land so the government could sell it, with an understanding that the proceeds would be used to purchase another piece of land adjacent to the existing IR 61A reservation. While the affected piece of land from IR 61 was surrendered and sold, and the land adjacent to IR 61A was purchased by the government, it was not added officially to the IR 61A reserve. A settlement in 2005 provided compensation for the lost use of the land, providing $6,999,900 in monetary compensation, and returned the land to the First Nation.

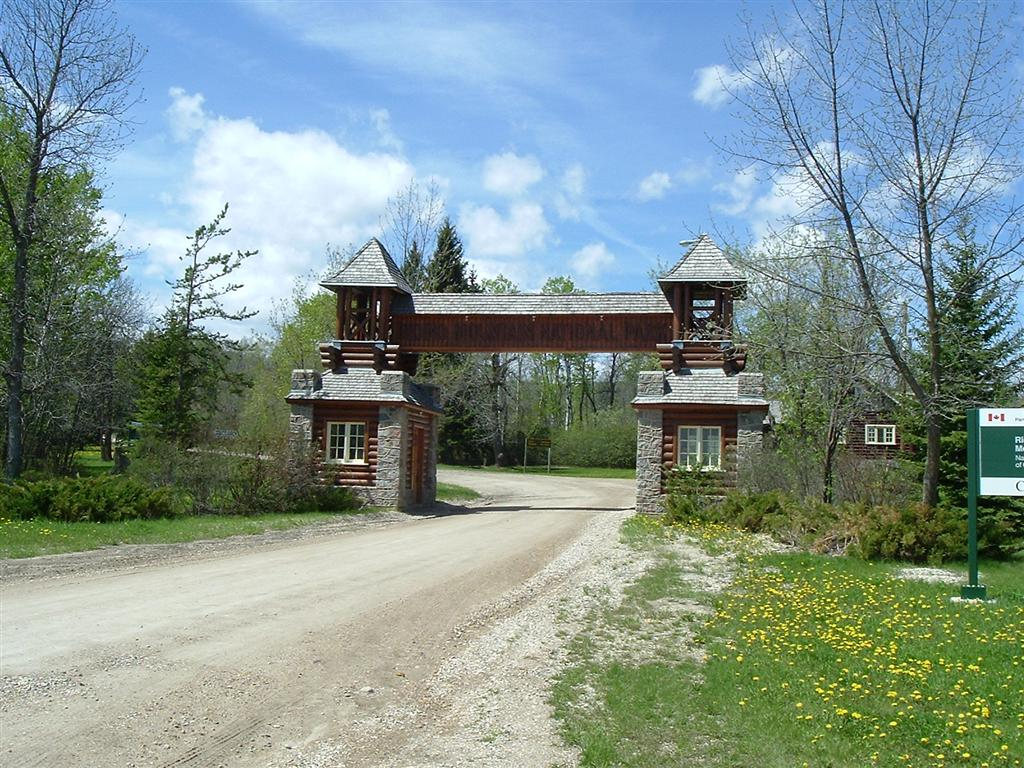
Riding Mountain East Gate registration complex

=== Later years ===
In 1965 the Winnipeg Tribune reported half a million visitors were entering the park annually. In 1970 Queen Elizabeth II, Prince Philip, Prince Charles and Princess Anne visited the park during their tour of Manitoba. In 1983 on the fiftieth anniversary of the park's opening a monument was erected south of the interpretive centre. In the 1990s land removed from the Keeseekoowenin Objiway First Nation in 1930 by the Department of the Interior was returned to them after a land claim. In 2013, Riding Mountain National Park celebrated the 80th anniversary of the creation and opening of the park. It was the first National Park in Manitoba, and one of the first in western Canada. Anniversary celebrations included a re-enactment of the official park opening ceremony, along with year-long arts, culture and wildlife programs.

== Geography ==
Riding Mountain National Park rises more than 457 metres (1,499 ft) over the surrounding Manitoba farmland. Riding Mountain is the highest point in the region, bordered by the Manitoba Escarpment in the east, the Valley River and Wilson River in the North, and a valley in the west. Further to the west is the Saskatchewan Plain.

Riding Mountain Biosphere Reserve covers 15,000 square kilometers of land in South-western Manitoba, with the core area, Riding Mountain National Park (RMNP), covering nearly 3,000 square kilometers. It is some 300 km northwest of Winnipeg, Manitoba. The local climate is cool and moist due to a higher elevation than the surrounding area. Due to these unique conditions, several different ecosystems are present in the vicinity of the park, including the deciduous forest, boreal forest, and grassland.

== Geology ==
During the last ice age most of the vegetation in the Riding Mountain region was eliminated, and it remained this way after the retreat of the glaciers 12,500 years ago. The Riding Mountain upland and surrounding plains and Manitoba Escarpment were mostly carved in the Tertiary era, but the ice sheets of the Pleistocene period modified the drainage and appearance of the land. Only the movement of the last ice sheet in this period left a visible effect on the features of the region. About 11,500 years ago a spruce dominated forest began to emerge in its place, with some of the vegetation being ash, juniper, sedges, buffaloberry, and trembling aspen. After this time the climate was dry, and the percentage of spruce decreased. During the Holocene climatic optimum up until 6500 years ago the amount of herbs, shrubs and grasses in the park increased. At the end of this time beaked hazelnut appeared and the amount of bur oak increased, with the climate becoming cooler and moister. Up to 2,500 years ago the amount of grassland species in general decreased and boreal forests migrated into the Riding Mountain region. It was at this moment that ecosystems began to resemble those of today, with species such as tamarack, fir, alder, pine and spruce becoming more common. Several streams that run through the park have headwaters in Riding Mountain's lakes. Clear Lake's water comes from underground springs rather than from streams.

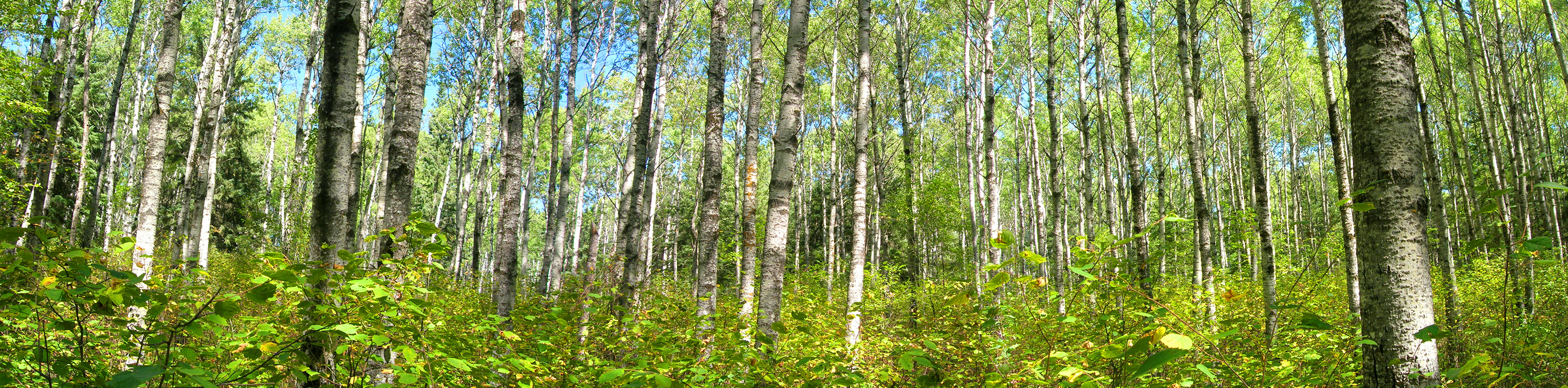
A panorama of poplars on the Loon Island trail in Riding Mountain National Park.

== Climate ==
The climate in the Riding Mountain region is similar to that of other regions of southwestern Manitoba. Under the Köppen classification it has a continental climate. It includes grasslands, upland boreal and eastern deciduous forest ecosystems. The park has hot summers and cold winters, with annual rainfall ranging from 40.6 to 50.8 cm. Around 80 percent of rainfall occurs between the months of April and October, with June being the wettest month of the year. The increased precipitation during the summer months is due to the large number of lakes and wetlands within the region as well as turbulence caused by the surrounding Manitoba escarpment. During the winter at an elevation of about 732 meters the mean snowfall is 127 centimetres. At a lower altitude of about 335 meters the snowfall drops to 25.4 centimetres. The town site Wasagaming has an average July temperature of 16.5 °C and an average January temperature of -19.7 °C. In general there is a lower amount of humid days within the park than in the surrounding prairie region. Wasagaming has lighter winds than the rest of the park due to the surrounding forest cover.

== Wildlife ==
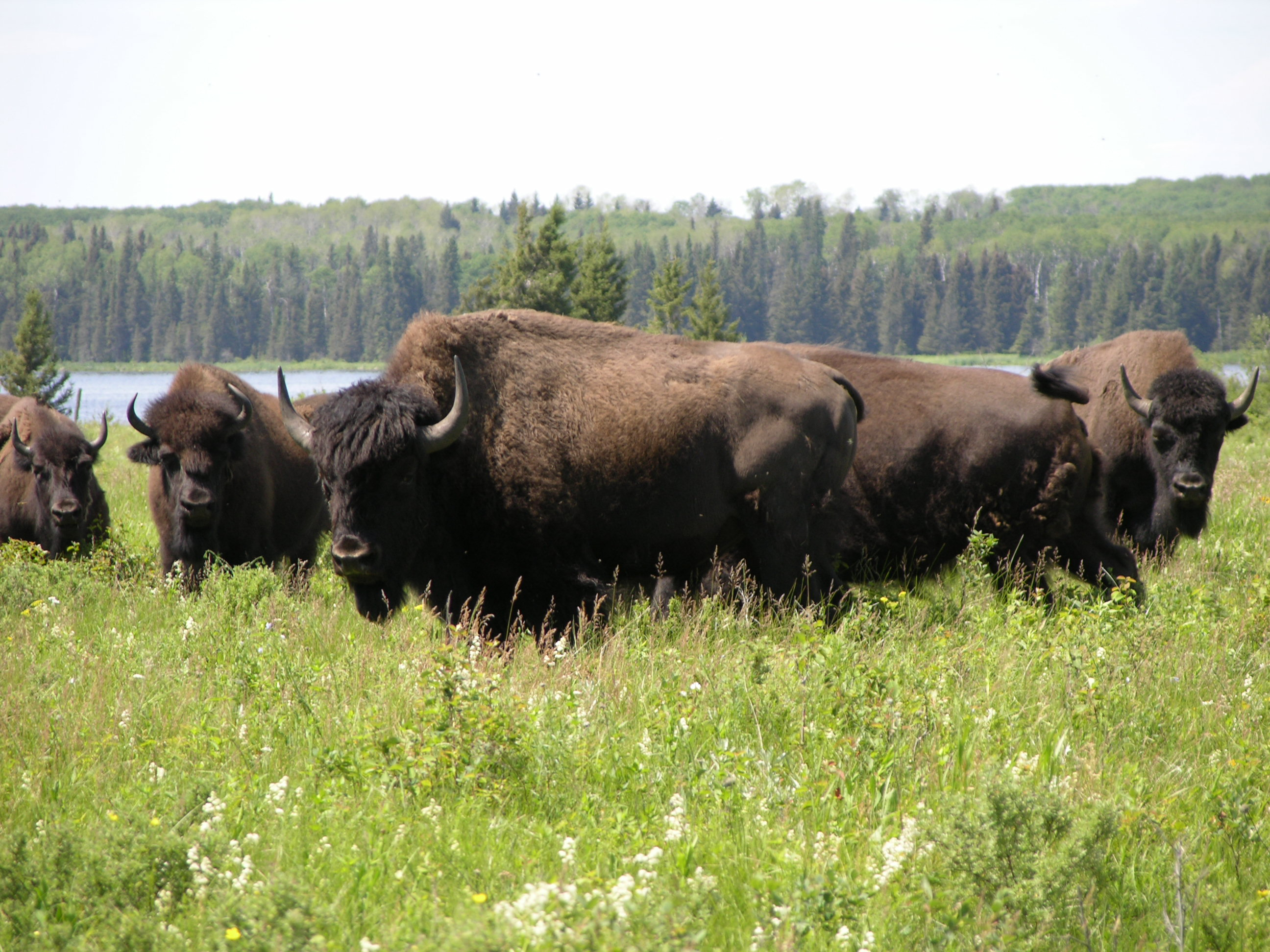
A bison herd near Lake Audy

=== Fauna ===
Elk, porcupines, coyotes, western moose, Northwestern wolves, beavers, Canada lynxes, white-tailed deer, snowshoe hares, and cougars are among the animals that roam around this park. Common loons and Canada geese are some of Clear Lake's bird inhabitants. In total there have been 233 bird species observed by visitors in this park. The park also boasts one of the largest populations of black bears in North America. The black bear is one of sixty species of mammals inhabiting the forest within this park.

The Lake Audy Bison Enclosure has a herd of about forty bison. Twenty bison were originally reintroduced from Alberta in 1931.

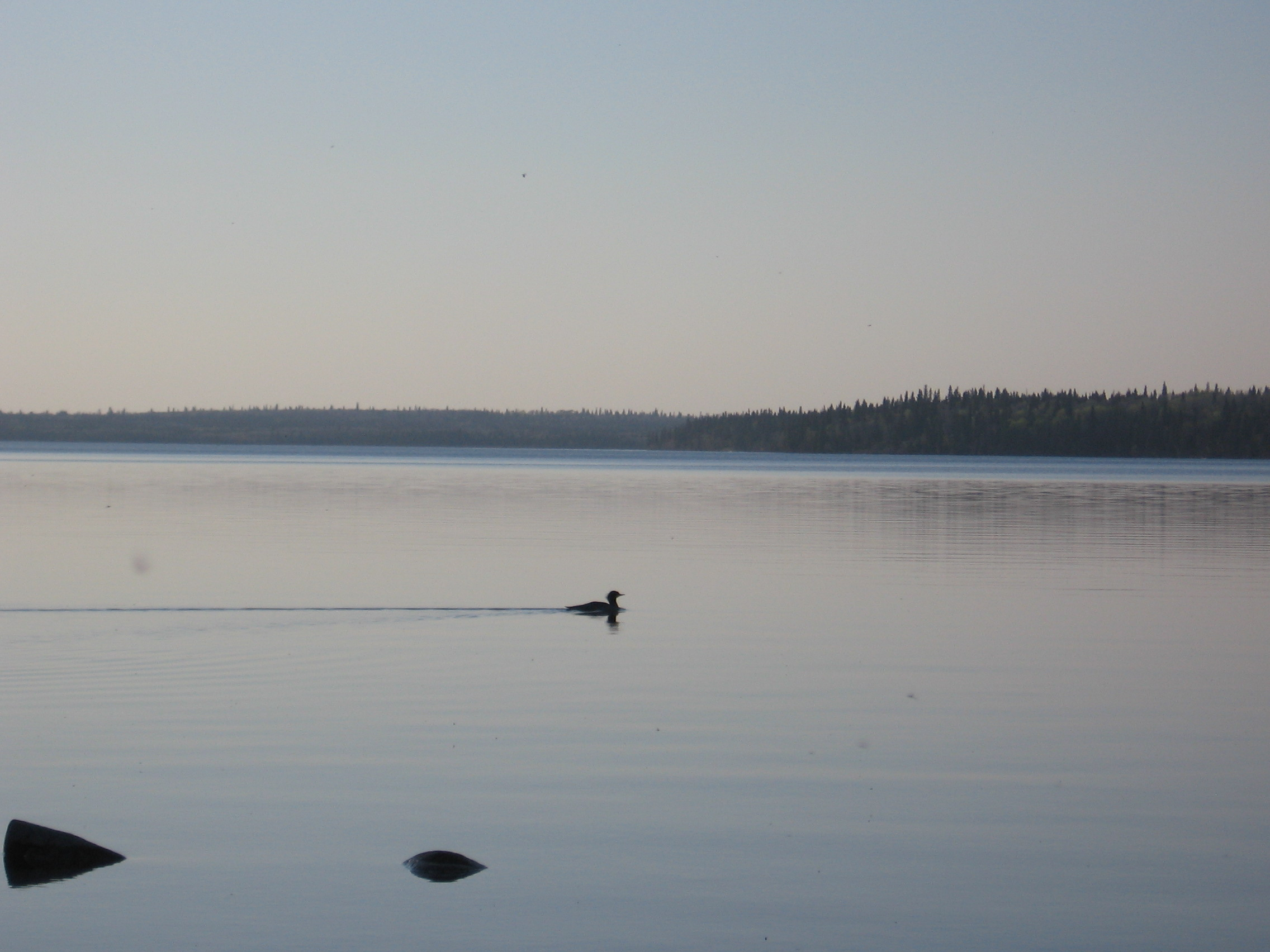
A duck in Clear Lake

Freshwater lakes within the park including Clear Lake, Lake Audy, Moon Lake and Whirlpool Lake among others. Walleye, white fish and perch are found in Clear Lake, and a limited number of rainbow and brook trout can be found in Lake Katherine and Deep Lake.

=== Flora ===
Riding Mountain National Park is also well known for its wildflowers and wide range of unique vegetation, most of which is not seen anywhere else in the prairie regions of Canada. There are 669 species of plants in the park. Vegetation common to the region includes aspen poplar, balsam poplar, white birch or paper birch, white spruce, balsam fir, jack pine, black spruce, tamarack, American elm, Manitoba maple, and bur oak.

== Tourism ==
Riding Mountain National Park is accessible by car and bus from two municipalities. Dauphin lies 13 kilometres to the north and Brandon lies 95 kilometres to the south, connected by Manitoba Highway 10 with Wasagaming. Both of these cities have commercial airports, as does the community of Erickson. Manitoba Highway 19 enters the park through the escarpment region from the east. A permit is needed to enter Riding Mountain National Park by vehicle, and can be purchased at the park gates. In 1992 the East Entrance was designated a National Historic Site of Canada in recognition of its historic and rustic architectural design. The gate was designed by Canadian architect Shamus Marshall.

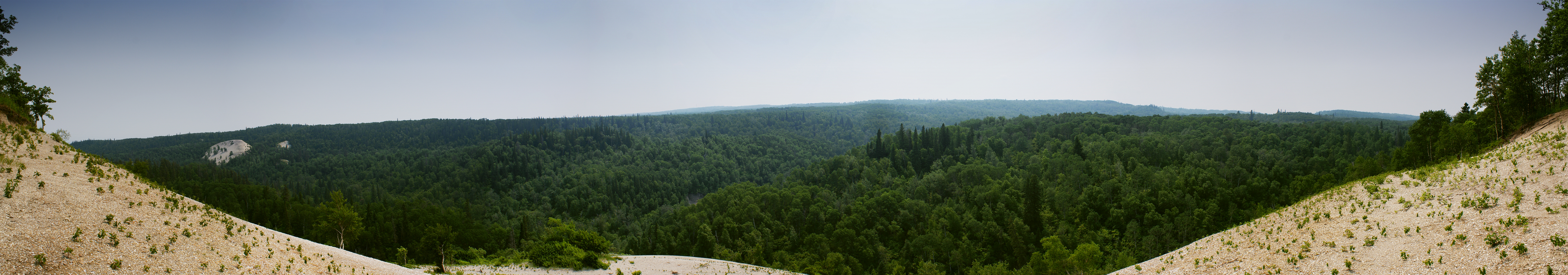
The Manitoba Escarpment in Riding Mountain National Park, with surrounding topography and vegetation. View from the J.E.T. trail.

=== Cultural events ===
Community events held in Wasagaming include the Riding Mountain National Park Film Festival and an annual LGBTQ Pride weekend.

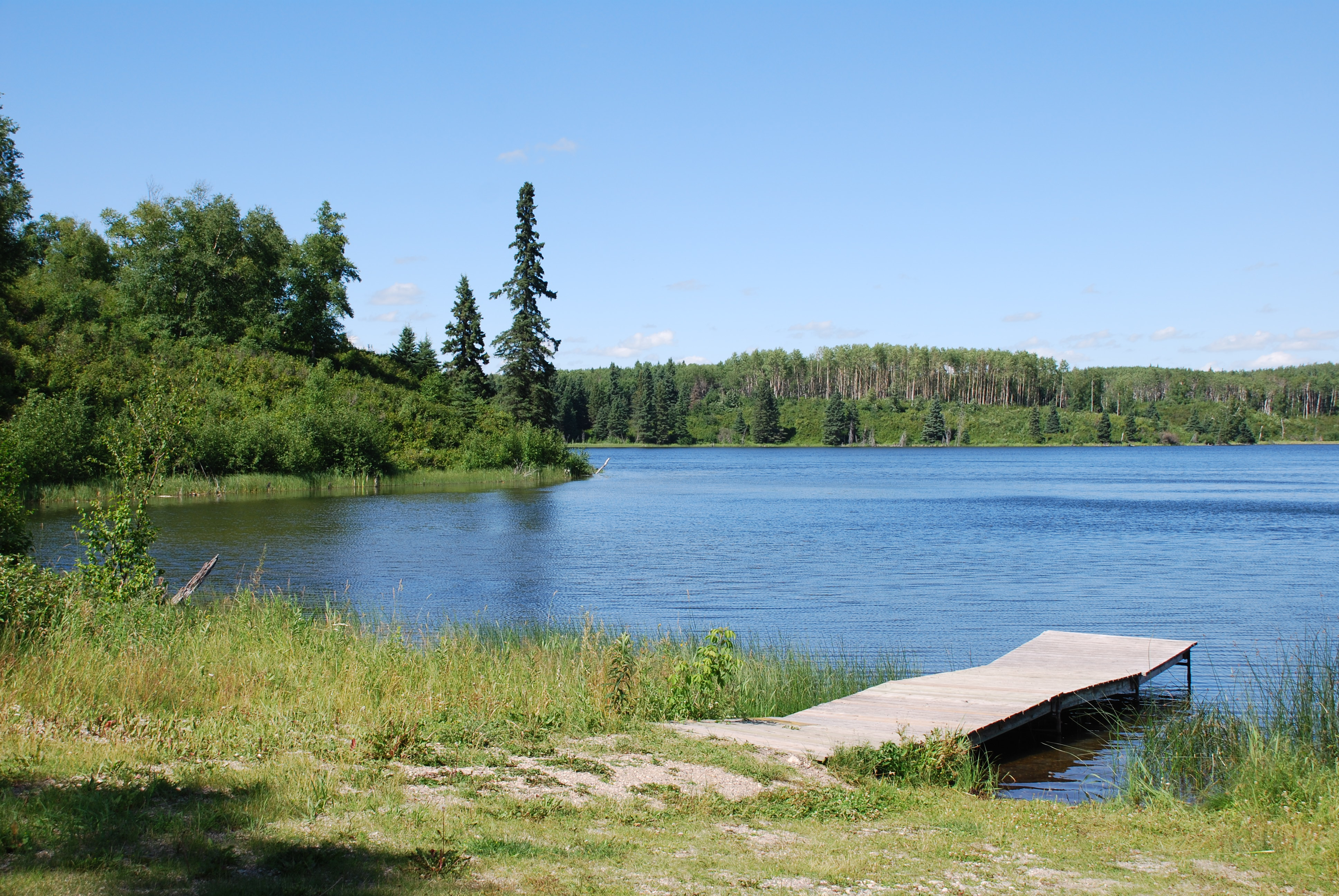
Deep Lake

=== Trails ===
Riding Mountain National Park has over 400 km (250 mi) of trails, with surfaces ranging from being grassy to gravelled. Backpacking trails include Ochre River Trail, South Escarpment Trail, and the Tilson Lake Trail. The Central, Baldy Lake and Strathclair trails are easy cycling trails while the Packhorse, Jet and Baldy Hill trails are more difficult On most back-country trails horse use is allowed, equipment being provided by local outfitters. During the winter months trails are open to cross-country skiing, which are not patrolled daily.

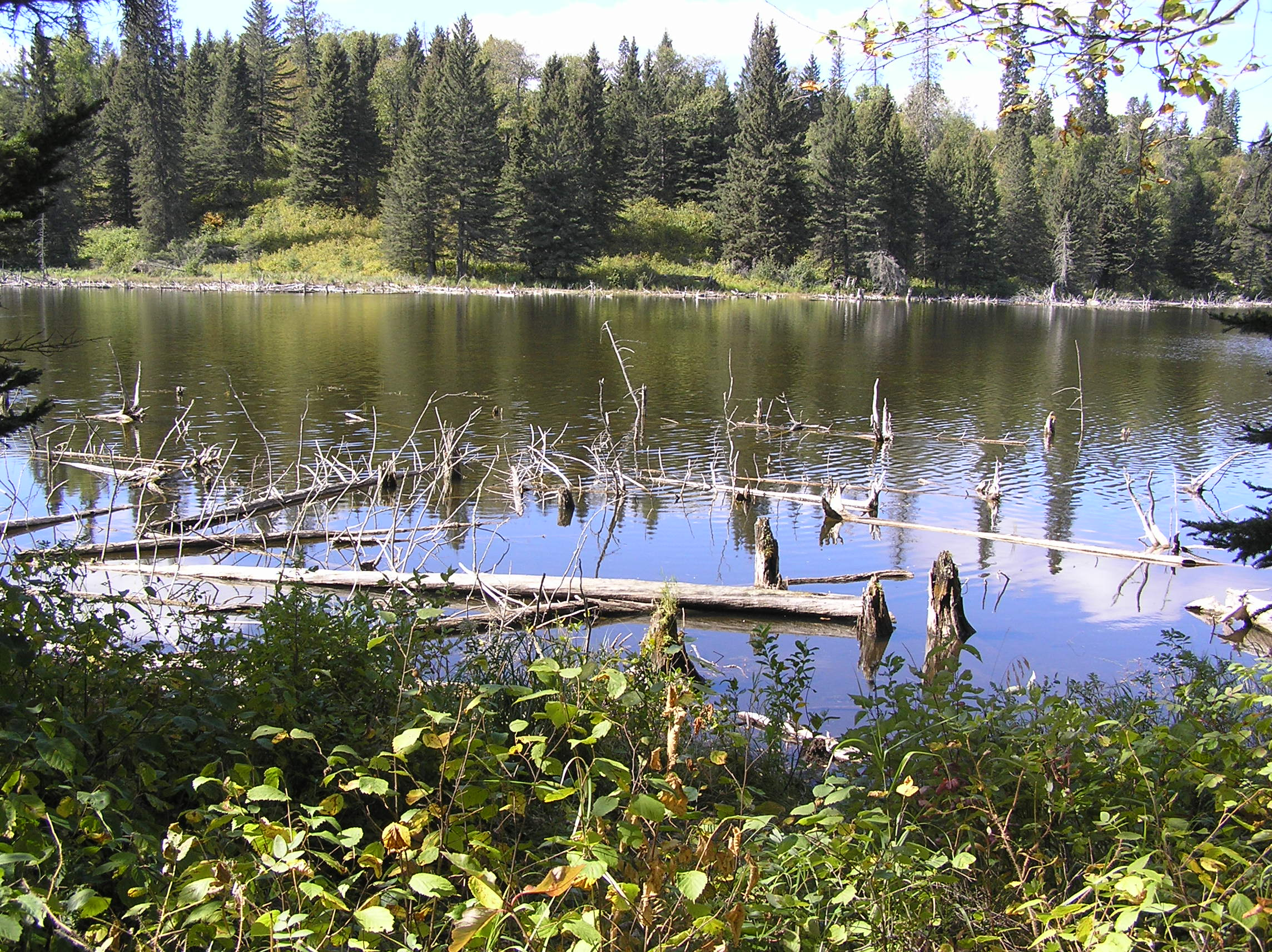
Riding Mountain National Park Back Country

=== Activities ===
Lakes suitable for swimming include Clear Lake, Lake Katherine, Lake Audy and Moon Lake. Most of the other lakes in the park have muddy bottoms, so swimming is difficult but possible.

Wasagaming campground is a full service campground located near the Wasagaming townsite and Clear Lake. All sites in the Wasagaming campground contain a fire box, picnic table, and access to washrooms at the unserviced camp sites, and full service sites are equipped with all modern amenities including sewer, electricity, water, picnic table, and fire box. Other campgrounds suitable for car camping are located at Lake Audy, Moon Lake and Deep Lake.

Tent camping is available at all campgrounds within the park. Whirlpool Lake campground is designated as a tenting only campground. There are also 22 wilderness campsites located in the back country of the park. These sites are equipped with firewood, pit privies, picnic tables and food storage containers.

There are 15 picnic sites in the park, usually along major roads and trails, such as Wasgaming, Lake Audy, and Moon Lake. These sites are equipped with barbecue pits, pit privies, and most have access to drinking water.

Clear Lake Golf Course is within park boundaries along the shores of Clear Lake. The course has received recognition in several North American golf publications. There are six professional tennis courts in the park at the Wasagaming townsite.

== Management ==
=== National park ===
Riding Mountain National Park is managed by the Parks Canada Agency, a branch of the Government of Canada. Over the years an increased emphasis was placed on wilderness conservation and commercial expansion within Riding Mountain National Park was limited. Any construction in the park is subject to an environmental impact assessment under the Impact Assessment Act. Ongoing research in the park is done concerning predator and ungulate populations, endangered species and invasive species, the water basin, fire reintroduction, and grassland ecology.

Motorized boating is permitted on Clear Lake and Lake Audy. Moon Lake can also be used for boating though equipment must be carried 300 metres. On Whirlpool Lake, Deep Lake, Lake Katherine, and back-country lakes, only non-motorized boats can be used. All personal water crafts are banned within Riding Mountain National Park. Only four-stroke and direct injected two-stroke equipped motor boats are permitted on Clear Lake. Boats equipped with other motors are not permitted to use the lake for environmental reasons. The ban is enforced by Parks Canada and the RCMP.

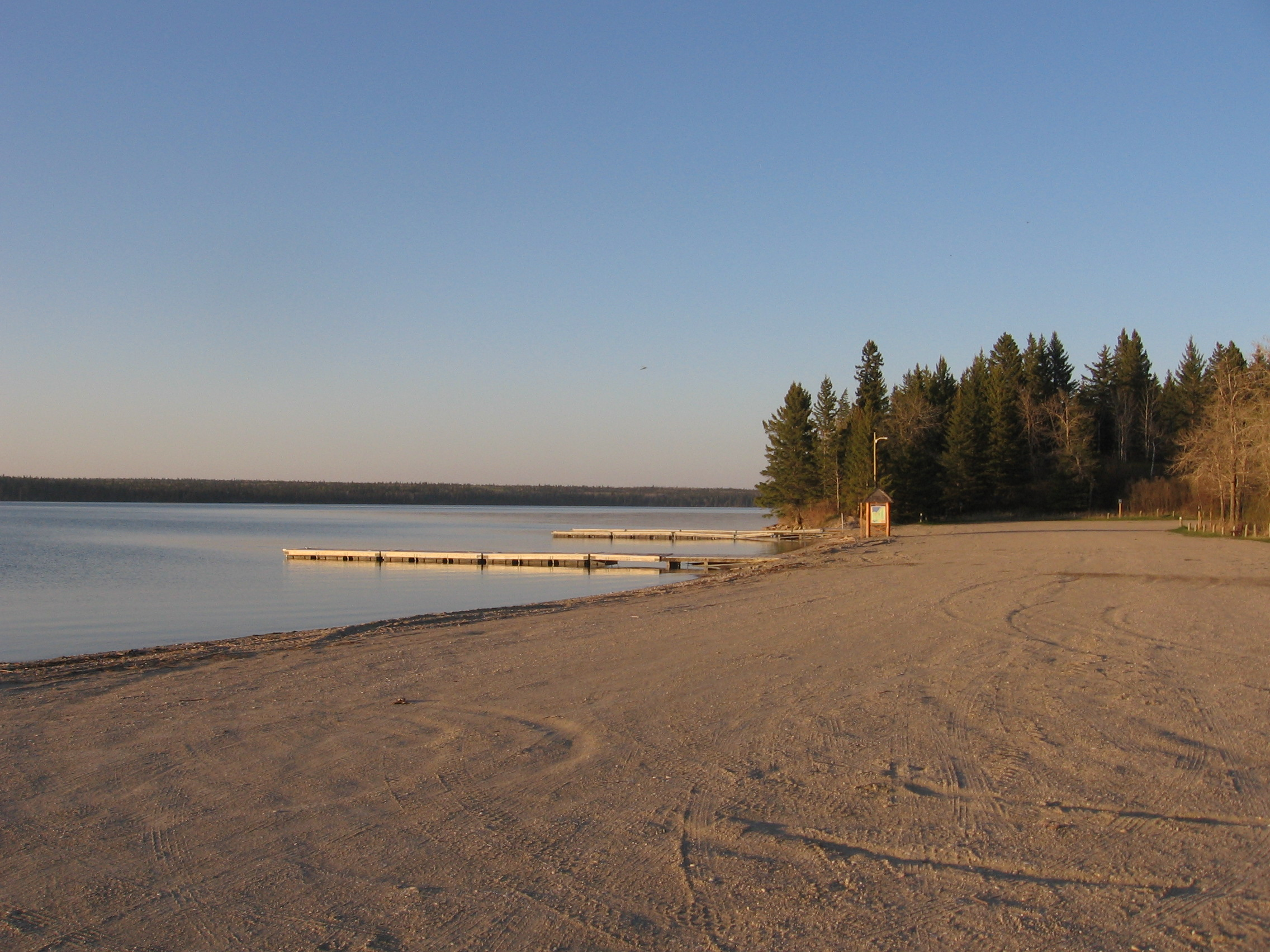
Boat Cove near Wasagaming in Riding Mountain National Park

Canoeing and kayaking are permitted in the park.

Ice fishing is allowed on Clear Lake during the winter months. Snowmobiling is allowed on Clear Lake for the aforementioned activity only.

All watercraft within the park must undergo inspection for aquatic invasive species. Of particular concern within Riding Mountain National Park is preventing the introduction of zebra mussels to Clear Lake.

=== Biosphere reserve ===
In 1986 the United Nations Educational, Scientific and Cultural Organization (UNESCO) designated Riding Mountain National Park and the surrounding area Riding Mountain Biosphere Reserve, as part of its Man and the Biosphere Programme. A non-profit volunteer organization was created and is managed by representatives from the surrounding area. Eleven communities participated in a consultation process via The Riding Mountain Liaison Committee (RMNLC) prior to the UNESCO designation. Upon establishment, the Biosphere Reserve included 18 municipalities, several of which were merged in 2015 as a result of the Manitoba Municipal Amalgamation Act enacted in 2013 by the Manitoba provincial government. A Biosphere Reserve Management Committee (BRMC) was created to oversee the area. Biosphere Reserve land outside of Riding Mountain National Park is both privately and publicly owned and managed.

=== Indigenous partnership ===
In 1998 the Senior Officials Forum Agreement between Keeseekoowenin Ojibway First Nation and Parks Canada Agency was signed. The Coalition of First Nations with Interest in Riding Mountain National Park was established later for dialogue with all First Nations adjacent to the park, consisting of members of treaties 2, 4, and 1. These include Keeseekoowenin Ojibway First Nation, Ebb and Flow First Nation, Waywayseecappo First Nation, Rolling River First Nation, Tootinaowaziibeeng First Nation, Gambler First Nation, and Sandy Bay Ojibway First Nation. The coalition entered into an agreement with Parks Canada to share and put ideas into action, creating in 2006 the Riding Mountain Forum.

== See also ==
- Wasagaming - town-site in Riding Mountain National Park
- National Parks of Canada
- List of National Parks of Canada
- List of Manitoba parks
- Riding Mountain Biosphere Reserve
- Riding Mountain Park East Gate Registration Complex

== Sources ==
This article incorporates text from a free content work (license statement/permission). Text taken from UNESCO - MAB Biosphere Reserves Directory, UNESCO, UNESCO.
