= Manitoba Provincial Road 204 =

Provincial road in Manitoba, Canada

Provincial Road 204
- Henderson Highway; La Vérendrye Trail; Eaton Ave; W Rd; River Rd
- PR 204 highlighted in red

Route information
- Maintained by Manitoba Infrastructure
- Length: 30.9 km (19.2 mi)
- Existed: 1966–present

Major junctions
- South end: PTH 101 / Route 42 north of Winnipeg
- PTH 44 in Lockport
- North end: PTH 9A / PR 320 in Selkirk

Location
- Country: Canada
- Province: Manitoba
- Rural municipalities: East St. Paul; St. Clements
- Major cities: Selkirk; Winnipeg

Highway system
- Provincial highways in Manitoba; Winnipeg City Routes
← PR 203	→ PR 205

Provincial Road 204 (PR 204) is a provincial road in the Canadian province of Manitoba. PR 204 stretches from the province's capital, Winnipeg, to Selkirk, running under the name Henderson Highway between Winnipeg and PR 509. It has a short concurrency with PTH 44 in Lockport. PR 204 is part of the La Vérendrye Trail between Winnipeg and PR 212 in East Selkirk.

== Route description ==
Provincial Road 204 begins just north of Winnipeg at Route 42. It moves north, crossing the Perimeter Highway. Route 204 continuously stays near the Red River, crossing several side streets and passing Hyland Park. PR 204 crosses PR 202 and enters Lockport, coming to a concurrency with PTH 44. This concurrency crosses the Red River Floodway before PR 204 continues northward and crosses other streets. The road crosses the Red River on the Selkirk Lift Bridge originally completed as a toll crossing in 1937. It then enters Selkirk along Eaton Avenue, ending at PTH 9A (Main Street).

== History ==
PR 204 was the original route of PTH 9 between Winnipeg and Lockport. When the Provincial Secondary Highway system was implemented in 1966, PR 204's southern terminus was with Trans Provincial Highway 4 (now PTH 44) near Lockport. PR 204 was extended to Winnipeg when PTH 9 was reconfigured to the old PTH 4 in 1968.

== Major intersections ==
Division	Location	km	mi	Destinations	Notes
City of Winnipeg		0.0	0.0	Henderson Highway (Route 42 south) / Glenway Avenue – Downtown Winnipeg	PR 204 southern terminus; south end of Route 42 unsigned concurrency
City of Winnipeg		0.0	0.0	Winnipeg city limits	
East St. Paul		0.7– 0.9	0.43– 0.56	Perimeter Highway (PTH 101)	Grade separated; PTH 101 exit 72; north end of Route 42 unsigned concurrency
East St. Paul		3.8	2.4	Hoddinott Road	
St. Clements		13.0	8.1	Ludwick Road	Former PR 407
St. Clements	Lockport	17.7	11.0	PR 202 east (Birds Hill Road)	
St. Clements	Lockport	18.3	11.4	PTH 44 west – Selkirk	PR 204 branches east; south end of PTH 44 concurrency
St. Clements		18.6– 18.9	11.6– 11.7	Crosses the Red River Floodway	
St. Clements		18.9– 19.3	11.7– 12.0	PTH 44 east – Beausejour	Interchange; PR 204 branches north; north end of PTH 44 concurrency
St. Clements		27.7	17.2	PR 509 east (CIL Road) to PTH 59	North end of Henderson Highway
St. Clements	East Selkirk	29.3	18.2	PR 212 north (Ferry Road)	La Vérendrye Trail follows PR 212
↑ / ↓	↑ / ↓	30.3– 30.6	18.8– 19.0	Crosses the Selkirk Lift Bridge over the Red River	
City of Selkirk		30.9	19.2	Main Street (PTH 9A) to PR 320 north – Winnipeg, Gimli	PR 204 northern terminus
1.000 mi = 1.609 km; 1.000 km = 0.621 mi: Concurrency terminus; Route transition
