= Manitoba Highway 9A =

Highway in Manitoba

Provincial Trunk Highway 9A
- Manitoba Ave; Main St; Easton Dr
- PTH 9A highlighted in red

Route information
- Auxiliary route of PTH 9
- Maintained by Manitoba Infrastructure
- Length: 7.4 km (4.6 mi)
- Existed: 1960–present

Major junctions
- South end: PTH 9 southwest of Selkirk
- PR 204 east (Eaton Avenue ) PR 320 north (Main Street)
- North end: PTH 9 / PTH 4 northwest of Selkirk

Location
- Country: Canada
- Province: Manitoba
- Major cities: Selkirk

Highway system
- Provincial highways in Manitoba; Winnipeg City Routes
← PTH 9	→ PTH 10

Provincial Trunk Highway 9A (PTH 9A) is a provincial primary highway located in the Canadian province of Manitoba. The route is an alternate route of PTH 9 through Selkirk, Manitoba for those that are travelling to and from or want to go through Selkirk itself, instead of taking the bypass. The length of this highway is 7.4 kilometres (4.6 mi).

== Route description ==
PTH 9A begins in the Rural Municipality of St. Andrews in the hamlet of Old England at an intersection with PTH 9 (Main Street / Selkirk Bypass). The road heads northeast, paralleling the western banks of the Red River as a 4-lane divided highway to travel through the community before entering the city of Selkirk as it passes by a steel mill. It travels through neighborhoods and a business district before entering downtown, having an intersection with PR 204 (Eaton Avenue) before making a left onto 2-lane Manitoba Avenue, with Main Street continuing north as PR 320. PTH 9A leaves downtown and travels through more neighborhoods, where it makes a right onto Easton Drive, passing by a hospital as it enters a more rural area before coming to an end at an intersection between PTH 9 and PTH 4 (Selkirk Bypass), with the road continuing north as PTH 9 northbound.

== Major intersections ==
Location	km	mi	Destinations	Notes
R.M. St. Andrews	0.0	0.0	PTH 9 – Winnipeg	Through traffic follows PTH 9 south (Main Street)
Selkirk	4.2	2.6	Eaton Avenue (PR 204 south) – East Selkirk	
Selkirk	4.4	2.7	Main Street (PR 320 north) / Manitoba Avenue	PTH 9A branches east onto Manitoba Avenue
Selkirk	5.3	3.3	Manitoba Avenue, Easton Drive	PTH 9A branches northeast onto Easton Drive
Selkirk	7.4	4.6	PTH 9 / PTH 4 north to PTH 59 – Gimli	Through traffic follows PTH 9 north
1.000 mi = 1.609 km; 1.000 km = 0.621 mi
