= Alan Lagimodiere =

Canadian politician

Minister of Indigenous Reconciliation and Northern Relations
- In office July 15, 2021 – January 30, 2023
- Premier: Brian Pallister; Kelvin Goertzen; Heather Stefanson
- Preceded by: Eileen Clarke
- Succeeded by: Eileen Clarke

Minister of Natural Resources and Northern Development
- In office June 6, 2022 – June 9, 2022
- Premier: Heather Stefanson
- Preceded by: Scott Fielding
- Succeeded by: Greg Nesbitt

Member of the Legislative Assembly of Manitoba for Selkirk
- In office April 19, 2016 – September 5, 2023
- Preceded by: Greg Dewar
- Succeeded by: Richard Perchotte

Personal details
- Born: 1957 (age 68–69) The Pas, Manitoba
- Party: Progressive Conservative
- Education: University of Manitoba (BS, MBA); University of Saskatchewan (DVM)
- Occupation: Veterinarian; Hotelier

Alan Dean Lagimodiere is a Canadian provincial politician who served as the representative for the Legislative Assembly of Manitoba for Selkirk. Prior to his run for the Manitoba Legislature he was a hotelier and veterinarian. Soon after his election to a second term he was named the Minister of Indigenous Reconciliation and Northern Relations, though upon his appointment he was criticized for his vocal defense of the Canadian residential school system.

== Early life ==
Lagmodiere was born and raised in Northern Manitoba in the community of The Pas. He is Métis and a member of Manitoba's Metis Nation. Lagmodiere holds a Bachelor of Science degree in agriculture from the University of Manitoba, and later both a Master of Business Administration and a Doctorate in Veterinary Medicine from the University of Saskatchewan.

== Business career ==
Lagmodiere began his career in Selkirk, Manitoba as a veterinarian and businessperson. He has been a member of the Canadian Veterinary Medical Association, the Manitoba Veterinary Medical Association, and the Manitoba Hotel Association through his co-ownership of a group of local hotels.

== Electoral career ==
Lagmodiere who was elected as the Member of the Legislative Assembly of Manitoba for the riding of Selkirk in the 2016 election. He had previously run for the PC nomination in 2014 against fellow candidate David Horbas, whom he replaced at the last minute in the 2016 after Horbas was dismissed from running an additional time (Horbas claimed he was not informed of the decision mid-campaign). He is a member of the Progressive Conservative party, and defeated NDP incumbent and long-term MLA Greg Dewar in the election. He was re-elected in the 2019 provincial election. In 2021 Lagimodiere was appointed to the position of Minister of Indigenous Reconciliation and Northern Relations.

=== Defence of the Canadian residential school system ===
In the minutes following his appointment as the minister in charge of Indigenous Reconciliation and Northern Relations, Lagimodiere made comments defending the Canadian residential school system, and was criticized for his support of this tool of genocide. In a confrontation, Lagimodiere was corrected by NDP Leader Wab Kinew, who informed him that, "it was the express intent of residential schools to kill the Indian in the child—it is not cultural relativism, it is not revisionist history for us to say that that was wrong."

President of the Manitoba Métis Federation (MMF), David Chartrand, (of which Lagimodiere is a member of the MMF), later stated:

It is very disappointing for me to see one of my Metis citizens really bow down to somebody else's (way of) how they see the world. That is completely opposite of what we see, and for Lagimodiere to give up on his people, abandon his people, sit silent all these years hoping he is going to be appointed to minister, shutting down his principles, and definitely shutting down his nation.

Lagimodiere later stated he felt his claim for the virtuousness of the residential schools was misunderstood and chose not to apologize for the fourteen minute introductory speech that he had provided on his views. In response, Chief Sheldon Kent of Black River First Nation stated that the minister's, "comments were harmful, retriggering anger and discontent among our people. There was no good intention at Indian residential schools to promote and it is catastrophically irresponsible to suggest otherwise," while calling for his resignation.

== Personal life ==
Lagimodiere is married to his wife Judy Lagimodiere, with whom he has four children.

== Electoral record ==
2019 Manitoba general election: Selkirk
Party	Candidate	Votes	%	±%	Expenditures
Progressive Conservative	Alan Lagimodiere	4,872	51.84	-4.5	$26,525.81
New Democratic	Mitch Obach	3,329	35.42	+8.1	$23,914.53
Green	Tony Hill	716	7.62	+1.2	$256.70
Liberal	Philip Olcen	482	5.13	-2.9	$0.00
Total valid votes		9,399	99.38	+0.72	
Total rejected and declined ballots		59	0.62		
Turnout		9,458	59.25	+0.53	
Eligible voters		15,964			
Progressive Conservative hold		Swing		-6.3	
Source(s) Source: Manitoba. Chief Electoral Officer (2019). Statement of Votes for the 42nd Provincial General Election, September 10, 2019 (PDF) (Report). Winnipeg: Elections Manitoba. "Candidate Election Returns". Elections Manitoba. Elections Manitoba.

2016 Manitoba general election: Selkirk
Party	Candidate	Votes	%	±%	Expenditures
Progressive Conservative	Alan Lagimodiere	4,686	55.51	+16.13	$53,655.73
New Democratic	Greg Dewar	2,366	28.03	-28.00	$37,793.36
Liberal	Stefan Jones	1,390	16.47	+11.87	$14,356.00
Total valid votes		8,442	98.66	-0.57	
Total rejected and declined ballots		114	1.35		
Eligible voters / turnout		14,570	58.72	+3.95	
Source(s) Source: Manitoba. Chief Electoral Officer (2016). Statement of Votes for the 41st Provincial General Election, April 19, 2016 (PDF) (Report). Winnipeg: Elections Manitoba. "Election Returns: 41st General Election". Elections Manitoba. 2016.
