= Manitoba Provincial Road 320 =

Provincial Road in Manitoba, Canada

Provincial Road 320
- Main Street, Breezy Point Road
- PR 320 highlighted in red

Route information
- Maintained by Department of Infrastructure
- Length: 18.0 km (11.2 mi)
- Existed: 1966–present

Major junctions
- South end: PTH 9A in Selkirk
- PTH 4 near Selkirk
- North end: Netley Creek Provincial Park

Location
- Country: Canada
- Province: Manitoba
- Rural municipalities: St. Andrews
- Major cities: Selkirk

Highway system
- Provincial highways in Manitoba; Winnipeg City Routes
| ← PR 319 | → PR 321 |

Provincial Road 320 (PR 320) is an 18.0-kilometre-long (11.2 mi) north–south highway in the Winnipeg Capital Region of Manitoba, Canada. It connects the city of Selkirk with Netley Creek Provincial Park.

== Route description ==
PR 320 begins in the city of Selkirk at an intersection with PTH 9A (Main Street / Manitoba Avenue) in downtown. It heads north along Main Street as a four-lane divided highway for several blocks through neighbourhoods before narrowing to a two-lane road at an intersection with Lake Avenue. The highway leaves Selkirk, becoming known as Breezy Point Road as it passes by Selkirk Airport before winding its way along the left bank of the Red River for several kilometres to an interchange with PTH 4. PR 320 continues along the banks of the Red River as it passes through suburban areas for the next several kilometres, with pavement ending at the Clandeboye Road intersection, where it transitions to a gravel road. The highway travels through more remote areas as it crosses Whiskey Ditch and passes through Peguis 1F and 1E reserves of the Peguis First Nation. PR 320 finally enters Netley Creek Provincial Park, coming to a dead end at a boat ramp, located at the mouth of Netley Creek on the Netley Marsh of Lake Winnipeg.

== Major intersections ==
| Division | Location | km | mi | Destinations | Notes |
|---|---|---|---|---|---|
| City of Selkirk | | 0.0 | 0.0 | PTH 9A (Main Street / Manitoba Avenue) | Southern terminus; begins as divided highway |
| City of Selkirk | | 1.1 | 0.68 | Lake Avenue | Divided highway ends |
| St. Andrews | | 2.1 | 1.3 | Selkirk Airport | |
| St. Andrews | | 6.0 | 3.7 | PTH 4 to PTH 59 – Winnipeg | Interchange via access road |
| St. Andrews | | 9.9 | 6.2 | Clandeboye Road – Clandeboye | Pavement ends |
| St. Andrews | Peguis First Nation | 16.7 | 10.4 | Bridge over Whiskey Ditch | |
| St. Andrews | Netley Creek Provincial Park | 18.0 | 11.2 | Boat ramp | Dead end; northern terminus |
1.000 mi = 1.609 km; 1.000 km = 0.621 mi
