= Manitoba Highway 4 =

Highway in Manitoba

Provincial Trunk Highway 4
- PTH 3 highlighted in red.

Route information
- Maintained by Manitoba Infrastructure
- Length: 8.9 km (5.5 mi)
- Existed: 1988–present

Major junctions
- West end: PTH 9 / PTH 9A at Selkirk
- East end: PTH 59 near East Selkirk

Location
- Country: Canada
- Province: Manitoba
- Rural municipalities: St. Andrews; St. Clements
- Major cities: Selkirk

Highway system
- Provincial highways in Manitoba; Winnipeg City Routes
← PTH 3A	→ PTH 5

Provincial Trunk Highway 4 (PTH 4) is a provincial highway in the Canadian province of Manitoba. The highway connects the city of Selkirk to PTH 59, the main route to Grand Beach and cottage country on the east side of Lake Winnipeg.

== Route description ==
PTH 4 begins in Selkirk at an intersection between PTH 9 and PTH 9A, just northwest of the city center. The highway heads northeast for a few kilometers to leave Selkirk and enter Rural Municipality of St. Andrews. Passing through rural areas, it curves eastward to an interchange (via access road) with PR 320 and crosses the St. Peters Dynevor Bridge over the Red River, entering the Rural Municipality of St. Clements. PTH 4 is just to the north of East Selkirk, and has an intersection with PR 508 (La Vérendrye Trail), then continues south east for a few kilometers, ending at an intersection with PTH 59.

The entire length of Manitoba Provincial Trunk Highway 4 is a paved, rural, two-lane highway.

== History ==
The current PTH 4 first appeared on the 1989–90 Manitoba Highway Map. The current route has no relation to the previous PTH 4, which was a major transportation route in the province.

Originally, PTH 4 (which first appeared on the 1928 Manitoba Highway Map) started its course in Portage la Prairie at a junction with PTH 1. From Portage la Prairie, the road traveled north following the current Provincial Road (PR) 240 to Mile 71N (formerly PR 249). The highway would then turn west and rejoin its current configuration just south of Macdonald. The junction was moved to its current location eight miles west of Portage la Prairie in 1950, where PTH 4 would make a right turn on what is now PTH 16, the Yellowhead Highway. At the Saskatchewan border, PTH 4 became Highway 14. The original section between Portage la Prairie and Macdonald was designated as PTH 4A between 1953 and 1965.

PTH 4 became a trans-provincial highway in 1958 when PTH 1 was reconfigured to its current route to become part of the Trans-Canada Highway system four years later. Former sections of PTH 1 were redesignated as PTH 4. At this point, PTH 4 began near the Ontario border, passing through Whitemouth and Beausejour to Lockport. From Lockport, the highway traveled south, entering Winnipeg as Main St and sharing the highway's course with Route 52 (then known as Route 50). At Portage Ave the highway turned right, sharing the highway's course with Route 85. PTH 1 merged on to Portage Ave from Broadway and the two highways continued along the same course out of Winnipeg.

Eight miles west of the Winnipeg city limits, PTH 4 branched off to the right through St. Francois Xavier and Poplar Point. It would then rejoin PTH 1 just east of Portage la Prairie. The two highways would once again share the road through Portage la Prairie to the previous eastern terminus.

In 1968, PTH 4's eastern terminus was returned to its previous location with the Trans-Canada Highway eight miles west of Portage la Prairie. The segments of the former trans-provincial PTH 4 east of this junction were redesignated as follows:

- PTH 44 between the Ontario border and Lockport
- PTH 9 between Lockport and Winnipeg
- PTH 26 between St. Francois Xavier and Portage la Prairie

The original section of PTH 4, which became part of the Yellowhead Highway system in 1970, was renumbered PTH 16 in 1977 to allow the route to retain the number 16 designation across all provinces in Western Canada.

In 1988, PTH 4 was revived as a connector route to PTH 59 to serve the needs of those travelling to and from Grand Beach and Selkirk. The speed limit on the route is 90 kilometres per hour (56 miles per hour).

== Major intersections ==
A list of major intersections on PTH 4's current course:

Division	Location	km	mi	Destinations	Notes
City of Selkirk		0	0.0	PTH 9 / PTH 9A – Gimli, Winnipeg	Western terminus
St. Andrews		3.2	2.0	To PR 320 – Selkirk	Interchange via access road
↑ / ↓		5.1	3.2	Crosses the Red River	
St. Clements		6.2	3.9	PR 508 (La Vérendrye Trail) – East Selkirk	
St. Clements		8.9	5.5	PTH 59 – Grand Beach, Winnipeg	Eastern terminus
1.000 mi = 1.609 km; 1.000 km = 0.621 mi
