= Gwen Charles =

Canadian politician

Member of the Legislative Assembly of Manitoba for Selkirk
- In office April 26, 1988 – September 11, 1990
- Preceded by: Howard Pawley
- Succeeded by: Greg Dewar

Personal details
- Born: June 19, 1949 (age 76) Lindsay, Ontario, Canada

Gwen Charles (born July 19, 1949, in Lindsay, Ontario) is a politician in Manitoba, Canada. She was a member of the Legislative Assembly of Manitoba from 1988 to 1990, representing the riding of Selkirk for the Manitoba Liberal Party.

The daughter of Allen Glover, she grew up in Belleville Ontario and began her career at the municipal level, serving as a councillor in the town of Selkirk. She married Garry James Gordon Charles in 1969. Charles first ran for provincial office in the election of 1986, finishing third in the Selkirk riding with 1,023 votes. At the time, the riding's MLA was New Democrat Howard Pawley, the provincial Premier.

In early 1988, Pawley's government was unexpectedly defeated when disgruntled backbencher Jim Walding voted against his party's annual budget in an evenly divided legislature. Pawley stepped down as premier and did not run in the election which followed. With the riding open, Charles was able to defeat NDP candidate Terry Sargeant by just 184 votes.

The Liberals increased their parliamentary representation from one to twenty in this election, and Charles spent the next two years in the official opposition. In 1990, she supported Paul Martin for the leadership of the Liberal Party of Canada.

Like many of her Liberal colleagues, she was defeated in the 1990 election amid a general decline in support for her party (once again, she placed third behind the NDP and Progressive Conservative candidates).

Gwen moved back to Ontario and built one of the first social enterprises, Pivotal Services of London, winning the Peter F. Drucker Award for Innovation.

== Elections ==
1986 Manitoba general election: Selkirk
Party	Candidate	Votes	%	±%
New Democratic	Howard Pawley	5,135	54.93	-9.17
Progressive Conservative	Eugene Kinaschuk	3,119	33.36	-1.05
Liberal	Gwen Charles	1,023	10.94	–
Progressive	Raye Porhownik	72	0.77	-0.72
Total valid votes		9,349	–	–
Rejected		19	–	
Eligible voters / Turnout		12,502	74.93	-0.10
New Democratic hold		Swing		-4.06
Source(s) Source: Manitoba. Chief Electoral Officer (1999). Statement of Votes for the 37th Provincial General Election, September 21, 1999 (PDF) (Report). Winnipeg: Elections Manitoba.

1988 Manitoba general election: Selkirk
Party	Candidate	Votes	%	±%
Liberal	Gwen Charles	3,821	35.35	24.40
New Democratic	Terry Sargeant	3,637	33.64	-21.28
Progressive Conservative	Eugene Kinaschuk	3,138	29.03	-4.33
Western Independence	Ruth Van Koeveringe	214	1.98	–
Total valid votes		10,810	–	–
Rejected		10	–	
Eligible voters / turnout		13,448	80.46	5.53
Liberal gain from New Democratic		Swing		+22.85
Source(s) Source: Manitoba. Chief Electoral Officer (1999). Statement of Votes for the 37th Provincial General Election, September 21, 1999 (PDF) (Report). Winnipeg: Elections Manitoba.

1990 Manitoba general election: Selkirk
Party	Candidate	Votes	%	±%
New Democratic	Greg Dewar	3,735	36.58	2.93
Progressive Conservative	Russ Farrell	3,467	33.95	4.92
Liberal	Gwen Charles	3,009	29.47	-5.88
Total valid votes		10,211	–	–
Rejected		31	–	
Eligible voters / turnout		13,758	74.44	-6.01
New Democratic gain from Liberal		Swing		+4.41
Source(s) Source: Manitoba. Chief Electoral Officer (1999). Statement of Votes for the 37th Provincial General Election, September 21, 1999 (PDF) (Report). Winnipeg: Elections Manitoba.
