= Felix Holtmann =

Canadian politician

Felix Holtmann (born December 5, 1944) is a former Canadian politician. He served in the House of Commons of Canada from 1984 to 1993, as a member of the Progressive Conservative Party.

Holtmann was born in Rosser, Manitoba, and educated at the University of Manitoba, Warren College and Jessups School of Advanced Dairy Science. He received a diploma in agriculture and worked as a farmer. Before entering political life, he was a member of various hog marketing and advisory boards.

He was first elected to the House of Commons in the 1984 federal election, defeating New Democratic Party incumbent Terry Sargeant by 662 votes in Selkirk—Interlake amid a national landslide victory for the PC Party under Brian Mulroney. He was re-elected by an increased plurality in the 1988 election, for the redistributed riding of Portage—Interlake. During his time as a parliamentarian, Holtmann served as a backbench supporter of the Mulroney and Kim Campbell governments.

He was defeated in the 1993 election, finishing third against Liberal candidate Jon Gerrard. He attempted a comeback in the 1997 election, but lost to Liberal John Harvard in Charleswood—Assiniboine. He also sought the nomination of the Canadian Alliance party in the new riding of Portage—Lisgar for the 2000 election but lost to Brian Pallister who went on to win the seat in the general election.

Holtmann was arrested on drunk driving charges in 2002. Although he admitted drinking that night, he denied being impaired. He was acquitted by the courts on April 26, 2007, with the judge saying that although there was some evidence of impairment, there was still room for reasonable doubt. On the evening of June 4, 2015, Holtmann was arrested for drunk driving. He went to court on September 3, 2015. The judge in the case Lynne Stannard told Holtmann, "I don’t see a lot of 70-year-old people in court because they have figured it out, at your age, you should know better and shame on you for not." Stannard fined Holtmann $1,600 and prohibited him from driving for one year.

== Election results ==
1984 Canadian federal election: Selkirk—Interlake
Party	Candidate	Votes	%	±%
Progressive Conservative	Felix Holtmann	13,750	40.7	+4.7
New Democratic	Terry Sargeant	13,088	38.7	-7.0
Liberal	Ed Anderson	3,510	10.4	-7.7
Confederation of Regions	Doug Stefanson	3,301	9.8	
Libertarian	Bob Quenett	163	0.5	
Total valid votes		33,812		
History of Federal Ridings since 1867: SELKIRK--INTERLAKE, Manitoba (1976 - 1987), Library of Parliament, Parliament of Canada. Retrieved 26 January 2010.

1988 Canadian federal election: Portage—Interlake
Party	Candidate	Votes
Progressive Conservative	Felix Holtmann	13,307
Liberal	R. Harvey Harland	10,381
New Democratic	Gerry Follows	6,372
Reform	Alan Beachell	4,054
Libertarian	Dennis Rice	229
History of Federal Ridings since 1867: PORTAGE--INTERLAKE, Manitoba (1987 - 1996), Library of Parliament, Parliament of Canada. Retrieved 26 January 2010.

1993 Canadian federal election: Portage—Interlake
Party	Candidate	Votes	%	Expenditures
Liberal	Jon Gerrard	14,506	40.68	$48,438
Reform	Don Sawatsky	9,801	27.48	$40,040
Progressive Conservative	Felix Holtmann	7,036	19.73	$67,866
New Democratic	Connie Gretsinger	3,029	8.49	$6,976
National	Mel Christian	935	2.62	$2,756
Natural Law	Gary Schwartz	179	0.50	$0
Libertarian	Dennis Rice	92	0.26	$275
Canada Party	Hans C. Kjear	83	0.23	$0
Total valid votes		35,661	100.00	
Total rejected ballots		119		
Turnout		35,780	69.10	
Electors on the lists		51,779		
Source: Thirty-fifth General Election, 1993: Official Voting Results, Published by the Chief Electoral Officer of Canada. Financial figures taken from official contributions and expenses provided by Elections Canada.

1997 Canadian federal election: Charleswood—Assiniboine
Party	Candidate	Votes	%	Expenditures
Liberal	John Harvard	15,925	43.0	$37,585
Progressive Conservative	Felix Holtmann	8,664	23.4	$51,089
Reform	Cyril McFate	8,398	22.7	$21,501
New Democratic	Rupert Forde	3,923	10.6	$1,850
Marxist–Leninist	Mary Stanley	154	0.4	$11
Total valid votes		37,064	100.0	
Total rejected ballots		262	0.4	
Turnout		37,326	67.6	
History of Federal Ridings since 1867: CHARLESWOOD--ASSINIBOINE, Manitoba (1996 - 1998), Library of Parliament, Parliament of Canada. Retrieved 26 January 2010.
