= Richard Perchotte =

Canadian politician

Richard Perchotte MLA

Member of the Legislative Assembly of Manitoba for Selkirk
- Incumbent
- Assumed office October 3, 2023
- Preceded by: Alan Lagimodiere

Personal details
- Born: December 15, 1968 (age 57) Selkirk, Manitoba, Canada
- Party: Progressive Conservative
- Education: Red River College Polytechnic

Richard Perchotte is a Canadian politician, who was elected to the Legislative Assembly of Manitoba in the 2023 Manitoba general election. He represents the district of Selkirk as a member of the Manitoba Progressive Conservative Party.

Prior to being elected, Perchotte was the president of Janice Manufacturing, a business in Selkirk, Manitoba.

On October 24, 2023, he was appointed as the Shadow Minister for Advanced Education and Training.

== Electoral record ==
2023 Manitoba general election: Selkirk
Party	Candidate	Votes	%	±%	Expenditures
Progressive Conservative	Richard Perchotte	4,963	52.49	+0.65	$41,623.05
New Democratic	Mitch Obach	4,493	47.51	+12.10	$33,125.31
Total valid votes/expense limit		9,456	98.13	–1.25	$66,931.00
Total rejected and declined ballots		180	1.87	–	
Turnout		9,636	56.29	-2.96	
Eligible voters		17,120			
Progressive Conservative hold		Swing		-5.72	
Source(s) Source: Elections Manitoba
