= Selkirk Lift Bridge =

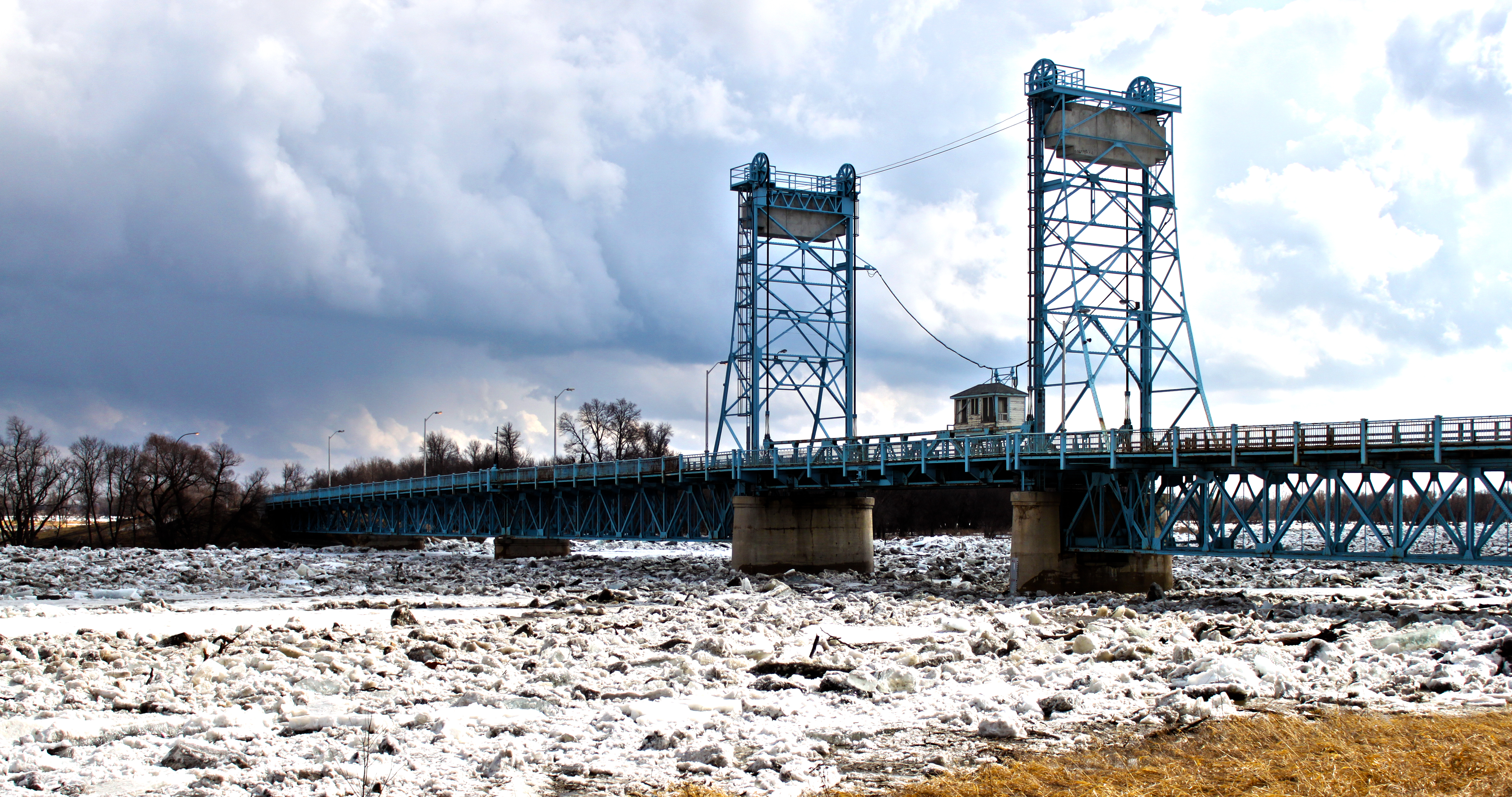
- Coordinates: 50°8′29″N 96°52′9″W
- Carries: Two lanes of PR 204, Pedestrians
- Crosses: The Red River
- Locale: Selkirk, Manitoba, Canada
- Owner: Province of Manitoba

Characteristics
- Design: Vertical-lift bridge

History
- Designer: Arthur J. Taunton
- Constructed by: Macaw and Macdonalds, Dominion Bridge of Montreal
- Construction cost: $250,000

Location
- Interactive map of Selkirk Lift Bridge

Selkirk Lift Bridge is a Vertical-Lift Bridge in Selkirk, Manitoba spanning the Red River. The Canadian government built the bridge as a work relief project during the Great Depression.

== History ==
=== Necessity for the bridge ===
Before 1934, the residents of Selkirk, and the nearby rural municipality of St. Clements wished to have a bridge connecting the two towns, instead of relying on a busy ferry service to traverse the Red River. However, in 1934, the Canadian government allotted $40 million to a national infrastructure program to uplift workers unemployed due to the Great Depression. Arthur J. Taunton, an assistant engineer for the Federal Department of Public Works of Winnipeg placed the location of the bridge in Eaton Avenue, in Selkirk. However, the Province of Manitoba refused to fund the project, forcing the bridge to act as a toll bridge, and a petition against the formation of a toll bridge was sent to the government on June 16, 1936.

=== Ownership and construction ===
Macaw and Macdonalds were chosen as the contractors for the project, the superstructure was awarded to Dominion Bridge of Winnipeg, and on March 31, 1935, the bridge was constructed at a cost of $250,000. As the bridge was being built, no government entity wished to take ownership of the bridge, as that would mean purchasing for its cost and maintenance. Due to confusion and unwillingness to own and operate the bridge, the bridge was raised above its deck to deter any crossing, and timbers were placed across the bridge. A local man named Ed Maloney lowered the bridge, and opened it to traffic. Later, the bridge was raised by a bit allowing only pedestrians to cross and disabling vehicles to go through the bridge, but was later lowered again. The bridge was administered by the Rural Municipality of St. Clements, Selkirk, but ownership was transferred to the Province of Manitoba when the bridge was converted into Manitoba Provincial Road 204.

=== Closure and reopening ===
During the 1970s, due to the age of the bridge, multiple repairs were completed on the bridge. In the year 1990, an official of the Provincial Highways Department described the bridge's condition as being in a "disgraceful condition". On January 6, 1992, the bridge closed for repairs worth $2.8 million, and was reopened on September 12, 1992.

== Image gallery ==
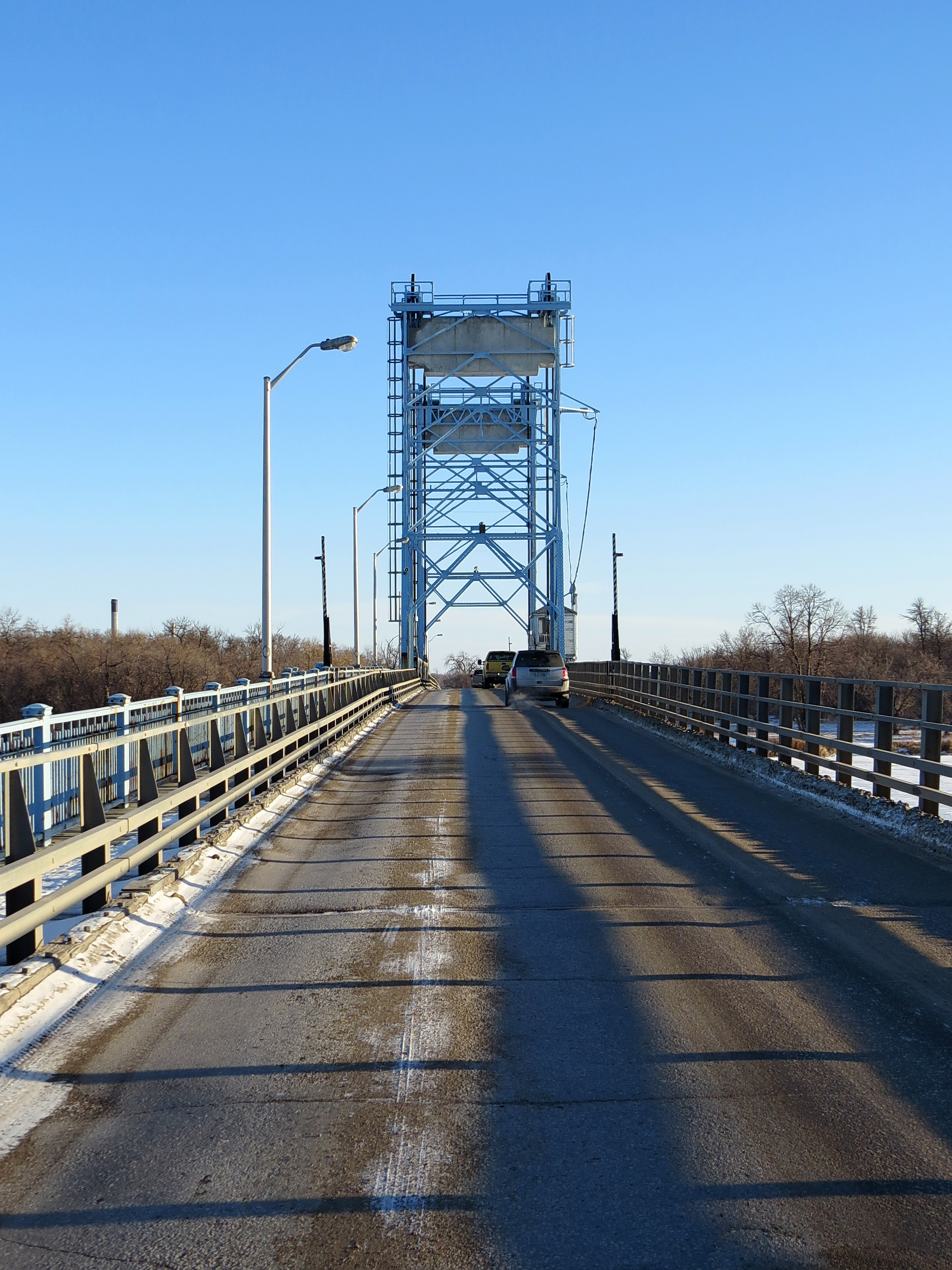
The deck of the bridge

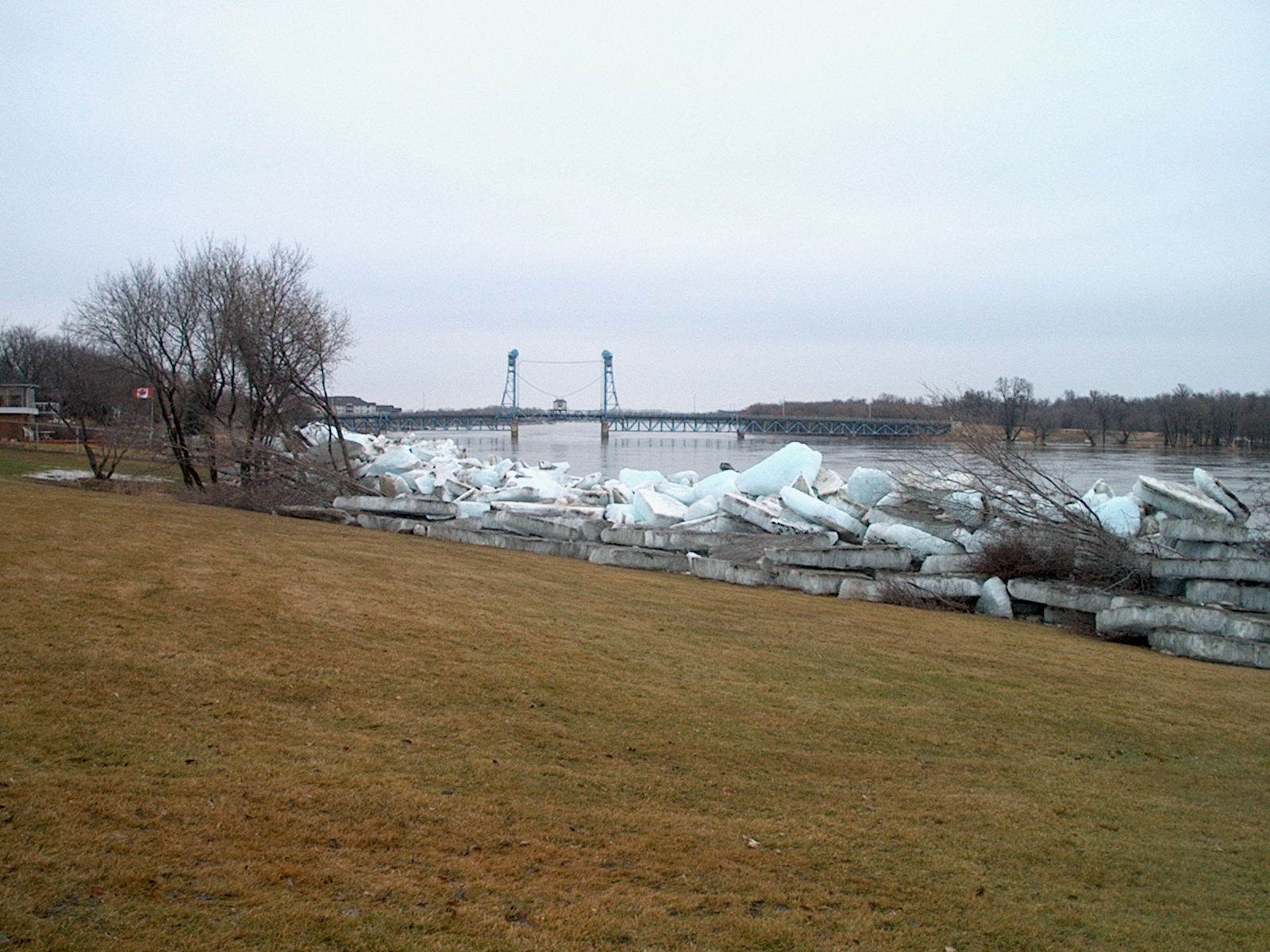
The Selkirk Lift Bridge during the 2009 Red River Flood

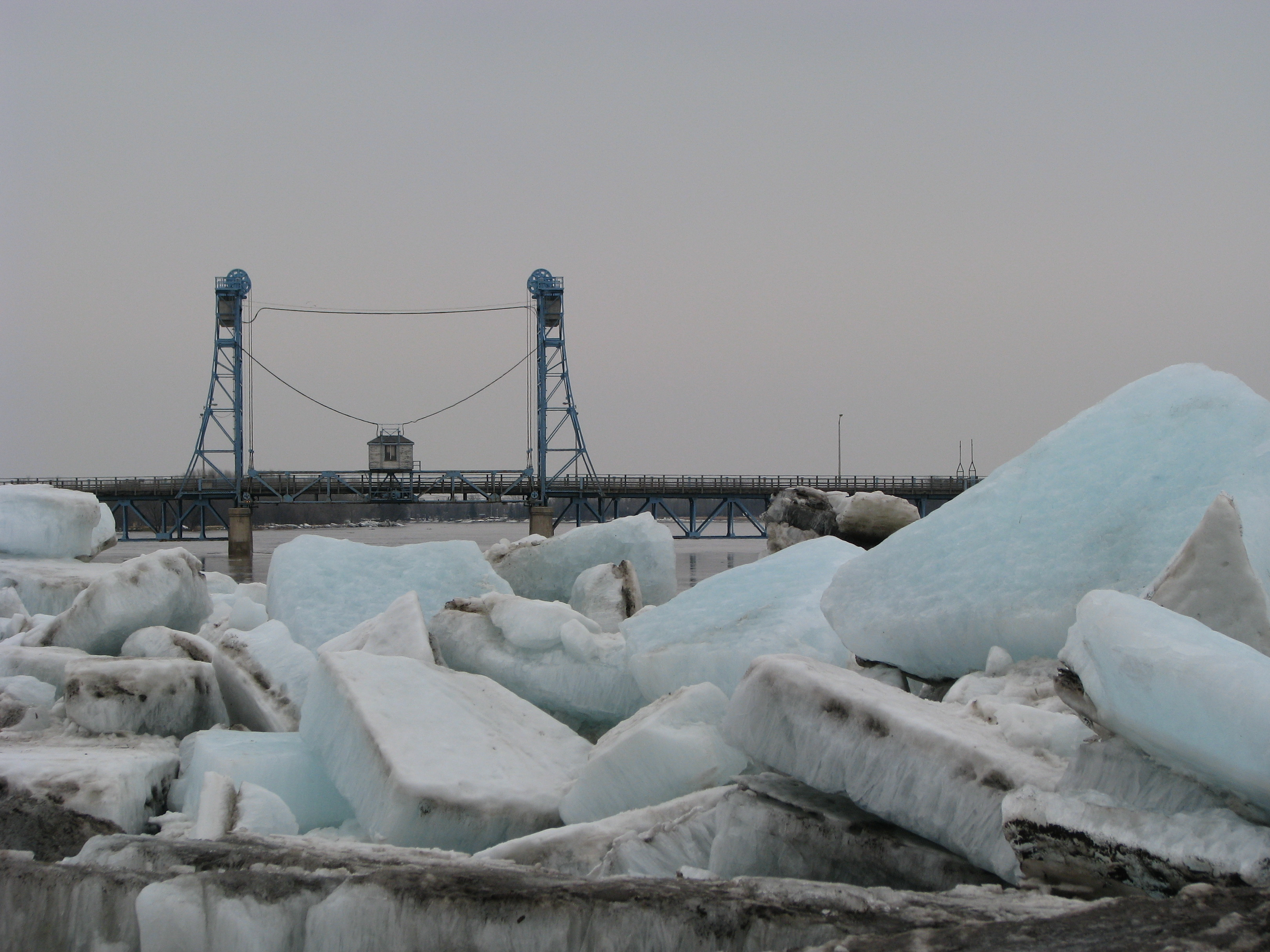
The view of the bridge from Veterans Memorial Park, at Selkirk

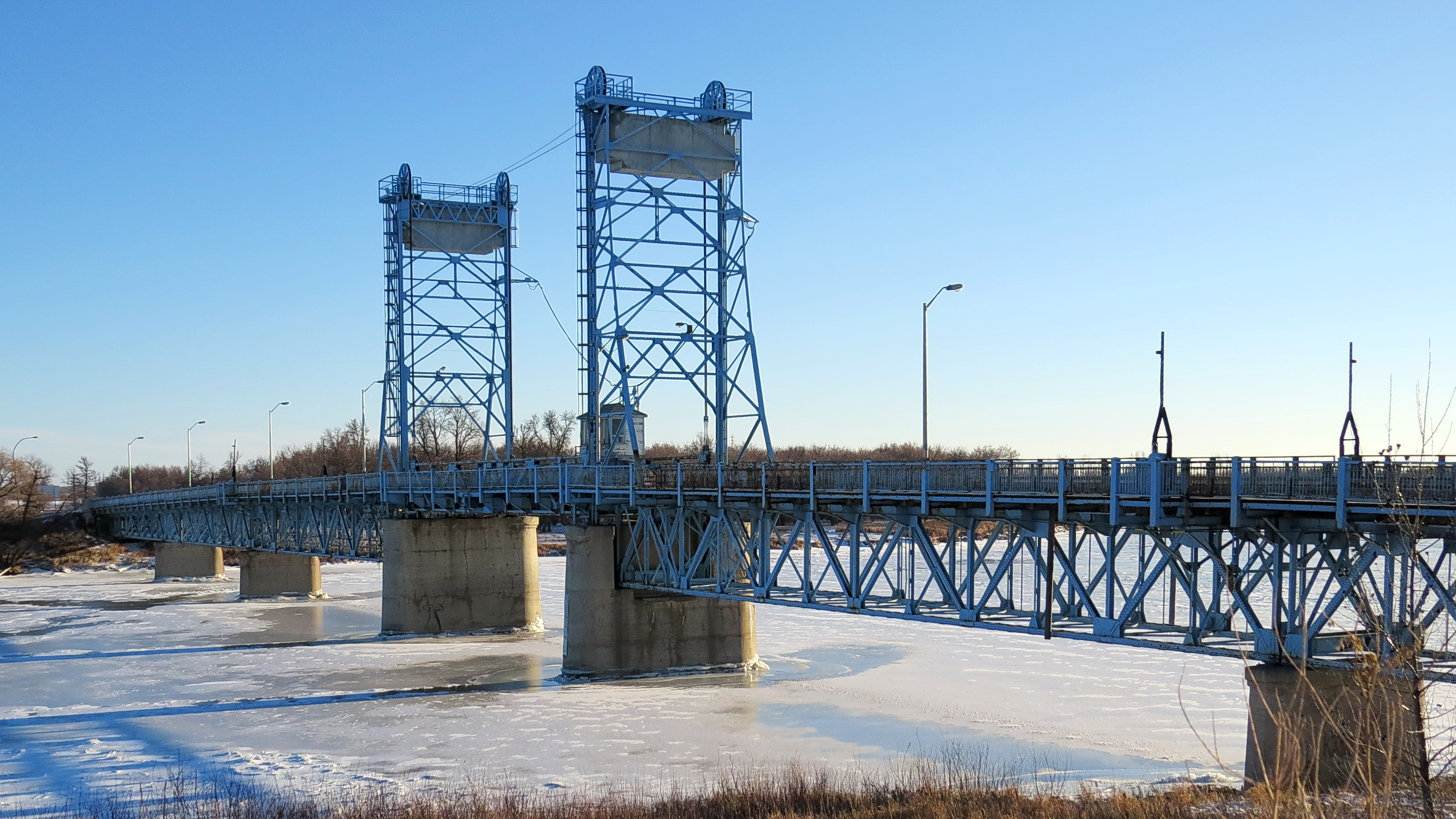
Side view of the bridge

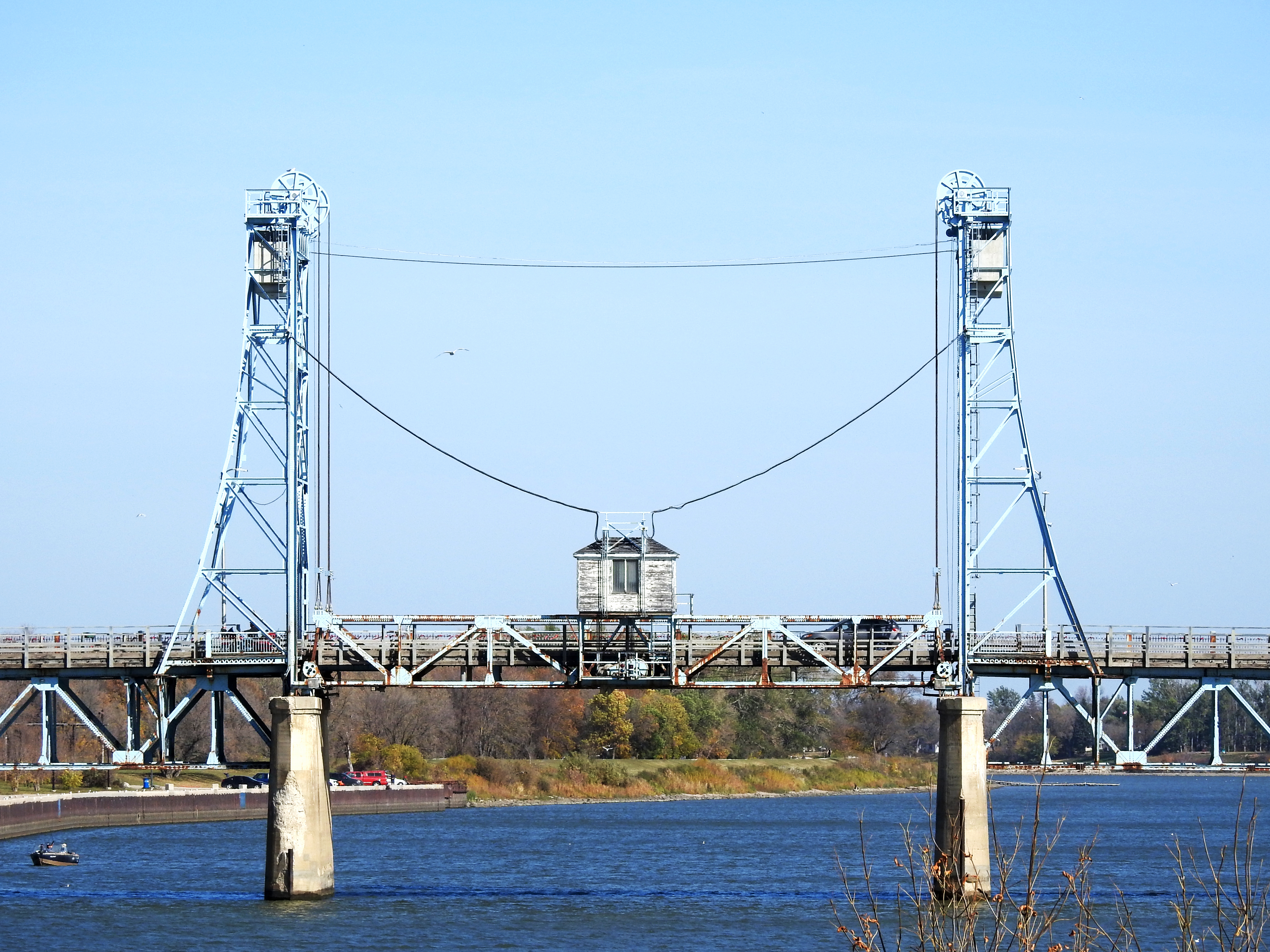
View of the lift span

== See also ==
- List of vertical-lift bridges
- Vertical-lift bridge
- Moveable bridge
