= The Farrell Bros. =

- Origin: Selkirk, Manitoba, Canada
- Genres: Psychobilly
- Years active: 1999–present
- Labels: Stumble records Raucous Records; Teen Rampage Records; Transistor 66
- Members: Gordie Farrell; Shawn Farrell; Nuke Norval

The Farrell Brothers are a rockabilly group from Selkirk, Manitoba, Canada. Their stage show was noted for being professional and high energy.

== History ==
The Farrell Brothers have released six CDs, beginning with 1999's The Ballad of Jackpine Slash. Two of the band's independent albums were re-released in England by Raucous Records, and in 2006 The Farrell Bros. completed a 30-stop tour in Europe in support of them. They then set out on a tour in Canada to support their contribution to the Zombie Night in Canada compilation album.

The band's 2003 album, Rumble @ The Opry!, released on the Teenage Rampage label, received positive reviews for its songwriting. It was reissued in 2011 by the Transistor 66 label, and appeared on campus radio charts.

In 2002, the Farrell Bros. performed at the Dawson City Music Festival. They have performed in clubs, bars and small concert venues in various Canadian cities, including Vancouver, Toronto, and Winnipeg.

The sound on band's 2005 album, This is a Riot, was compared to that of The Clash, and The Farrell Bros. contributed a track to the 2002 Clash tribute album This is Rockabilly Clash. A later release was Dead End Boys in 2007.

Although no albums have been released since 2007, in September 2021, the band reported on its Facebook page that it is still together.

== Current members ==
- Gordie Farrell - upright bass, vocals, guitar
- Shawn Farrell - guitar, vocals
- Nuke Norval - drums

== Discography ==
=== Main albums ===
- 1999: Ballad of Jackpine Slash, Independent
- 2000: Go to Hell, Independent
- 2003: Rumble @ The Opry!, Teen Rampage Records
- 2004: Curbstomp Boogie, Raucous Records
- 2005: This is a Riot, Stumble Records
- 2007: Dead End Boys, Raucous Records

=== Compilations ===
- 2005: Zombie Night in Canada Vol. 2, Stumble Records

== See also ==
- List of bands from Canada
- List of psychobilly bands
