= Portage—Interlake =

Former federal electoral district in Manitoba, Canada

Portage—Interlake was a federal electoral district in the province of Manitoba, Canada, that was represented in the House of Commons of Canada from 1988 to 1997.

This riding was created in 1987 from parts of Lisgar, Portage—Marquette and Selkirk—Interlake ridings. Portage—Interlake consisted of an area south of Lake Winnipeg.

The electoral district was abolished in 1996 when it was redistributed between Portage—Lisgar and Selkirk—Interlake ridings.

== Electoral history ==
1988 Canadian federal election
Party	Candidate	Votes
Progressive Conservative	Felix Holtmann	13,307
Liberal	R. Harvey Harland	10,381
New Democratic	Gerry Follows	6,372
Reform	Alan Beachell	4,054
Libertarian	Dennis Rice	229
History of Federal Ridings since 1867: PORTAGE--INTERLAKE, Manitoba (1987 - 1996), Library of Parliament, Parliament of Canada. Retrieved 26 January 2010.

1993 Canadian federal election
Party	Candidate	Votes	%	Expenditures
Liberal	Jon Gerrard	14,506	40.68	$48,438
Reform	Don Sawatsky	9,801	27.48	$40,040
Progressive Conservative	Felix Holtmann	7,036	19.73	$67,866
New Democratic	Connie Gretsinger	3,029	8.49	$6,976
National	Mel Christian	935	2.62	$2,756
Natural Law	Gary Schwartz	179	0.50	$0
Libertarian	Dennis Rice	92	0.26	$275
Canada Party	Hans C. Kjear	83	0.23	$0
Total valid votes		35,661	100.00	
Total rejected ballots		119		
Turnout		35,780	69.10	
Electors on the lists		51,779		
Source: Thirty-fifth General Election, 1993: Official Voting Results, Published by the Chief Electoral Officer of Canada. Financial figures taken from official contributions and expenses provided by Elections Canada.

== See also ==
- List of Canadian electoral districts
- Historical federal electoral districts of Canada
