= Greg Dewar =

Canadian politician

Manitoba Minister of Finance
- In office November 3, 2014 – May 3, 2016
- Premier: Greg Selinger
- Preceded by: Jennifer Howard
- Succeeded by: Cameron Friesen

Manitoba Government Whip
- In office before 2011 – November 3, 2014
- Premier: Greg Selinger

Member of the Legislative Assembly of Manitoba for Selkirk
- In office September 11, 1990 – April 19, 2016
- Preceded by: Gwen Charles
- Succeeded by: Alan Lagimodiere

Personal details
- Born: January 9, 1956 (age 70) Selkirk, Manitoba
- Party: New Democratic Party
- Education: University of Winnipeg
- Website: gregdewar.ca

Gregory Dewar, MLA (born January 9, 1956) is a politician in Manitoba, Canada. He is a former member of the Legislative Assembly of Manitoba.

Dewar was born in Selkirk, Manitoba, the grandson of former mayor Ben Massey. He was educated at the University of Winnipeg, and worked as a steelworker and as a small businessman prior to entering political life. Dewar served as treasurer of the Selkirk local of the Manitoba Metis Federation, and was a founding director of the Maurepas Village Housing Cooperative. He was also involved in the Selkirk Restitution and Reconciliation Committee, a program which assists young offenders.

Dewar was first elected to the Manitoba legislature in the provincial election of 1990, running as a New Democrat in the riding of Selkirk. He received 3735 votes, against 3467 for Progressive Conservative Russ Farrell (incumbent Liberal Gwen Charles was third with 3009). Dewar was re-elected by a wider margin in the 1995 election, and by a comfortable margin in 1999. The NDP formed government following the 1999 election, and Dewar was appointed Government Whip.

Dewar supported Lorne Nystrom's bid to become leader of the federal New Democratic Party in 1995. In 2003, he supported Bill Blaikie.

Dewar was easily re-elected in the provincial election of 2003, receiving more than 60% of the vote in his riding.

He was re-elected in the 2007 provincial election and in the 2011 provincial election. Dewar was the legislative assistant to the Minister of Finance. He resumed the role of Government Whip following the 2011 election and held that position until 2014.

On November 3, 2014, Dewar was appointed as Minister of Finance after then-Minister Jennifer Howard, along with four other ministers, resigned from cabinet over concerns about Premier Selinger's leadership.
