= Selkirk (provincial electoral district) =

Provincial electoral district in Manitoba, Canada

Coordinates: 50.247°N 96.858°W

Manitoba electoral district

Provincial electoral district
- Legislature: Legislative Assembly of Manitoba
MLA
Richard Perchotte
Progressive Conservative
- District created: 1957
- First contested: 1958
- Last contested: 2023

Demographics
- Population (2016): 22,030
- Electors (2019): 15,964
- Area (km²): 827
- Pop. density (per km²): 26.6

Selkirk is a provincial electoral district of Manitoba, Canada. It was created by redistribution in 1957 from part of St. Andrews, and has formally existed since the provincial election of 1958. It is named after the city of Selkirk, which in turn was named for Thomas Douglas, 5th Earl of Selkirk, who set up the Red River Colony colonization project in 1811.

== Division profile ==
Selkirk is bordered to the east by Lac Du Bonnet, to the south by Springfield, to the west by Gimli, and to the north by Lake Winnipeg. Most of the riding's population is located in the city of Selkirk. Other communities in the riding include Belair and Grand Marais, and there is a significant amount of agricultural land in the riding as well.

=== Demographics ===
The riding's population in 1996 was 19,409. In 1999, the average family income was $51,605, and the unemployment rate was 8.30%. Health and social services account for 16% of all industry in the riding.

Thirteen per cent of Selkirk's residents are aboriginal, while 8% are Ukrainian and 6% German.

=== Political history ===
The riding was safe for the New Democratic Party from 1969 to 2016, although the Liberal Party held the seat from 1988 to 1990. Former Premier of Manitoba Howard Pawley represented Selkirk from 1969 to 1988.

Current MLA Alan Lagimodiere, a Progressive Conservative, became the first member of his party to win the district when he won in 2016, defeating NDP MLA Greg Dewar. He did not seek reelection in the 2023 Manitoba general election.

== Members of the Legislative Assembly ==
Name	Party	Took office	Left office
Thomas Hillhouse	Lib-Prog	1958	1961
	Lib	1961	1969
Howard Pawley	NDP	1969	1988
Gwen Charles	Lib	1988	1990
Greg Dewar	NDP	1990	2016
Alan Lagimodiere	PC	2016	2023
Richard Perchotte	PC	2023	Incumbent

== Electoral results ==
2023 Manitoba general election
Party	Candidate	Votes	%	±%	Expenditures
Progressive Conservative	Richard Perchotte	4,963	52.49	+0.65	$41,623.05
New Democratic	Mitch Obach	4,493	47.51	+12.10	$33,125.31
Total valid votes/expense limit		9,456	98.13	–1.25	$66,931.00
Total rejected and declined ballots		180	1.87	–	
Turnout		9,636	56.29	-2.96	
Eligible voters		17,120			
Progressive Conservative hold		Swing		-5.72	
Source(s) Source: Elections Manitoba

2019 Manitoba general election
Party	Candidate	Votes	%	±%	Expenditures
Progressive Conservative	Alan Lagimodiere	4,872	51.84	-4.5	$26,525.81
New Democratic	Mitch Obach	3,329	35.42	+8.1	$23,914.53
Green	Tony Hill	716	7.62	+1.2	$256.70
Liberal	Philip Olcen	482	5.13	-2.9	$0.00
Total valid votes		9,399	99.38	+0.72	
Total rejected and declined ballots		59	0.62		
Turnout		9,458	59.25	+0.53	
Eligible voters		15,964			
Progressive Conservative hold		Swing		-6.3	
Source(s) Source: Manitoba. Chief Electoral Officer (2019). Statement of Votes for the 42nd Provincial General Election, September 10, 2019 (PDF) (Report). Winnipeg: Elections Manitoba. "Candidate Election Returns". Elections Manitoba. Elections Manitoba.

2016 provincial election redistributed results
Party	%
Progressive Conservative	56.3
New Democratic	27.3
Liberal	8.0
Green	6.4
Manitoba	2.1

2016 Manitoba general election
Party	Candidate	Votes	%	±%	Expenditures
Progressive Conservative	Alan Lagimodiere	4,686	55.51	+16.13	$53,655.73
New Democratic	Greg Dewar	2,366	28.03	-28.00	$37,793.36
Liberal	Stefan Jones	1,390	16.47	+11.87	$14,356.00
Total valid votes		8,442	98.66	-0.57	
Total rejected and declined ballots		114	1.35		
Eligible voters / turnout		14,570	58.72	+3.95	
Source(s) Source: Manitoba. Chief Electoral Officer (2016). Statement of Votes for the 41st Provincial General Election, April 19, 2016 (PDF) (Report). Winnipeg: Elections Manitoba. "Election Returns: 41st General Election". Elections Manitoba. 2016.

2011 Manitoba general election
Party	Candidate	Votes	%	±%	Expenditures
New Democratic	Greg Dewar	4,279	56.02	+0.38	$23,425.03
Progressive Conservative	David K. Bell	3,008	39.38	+3.56	$23,284.05
Liberal	Marilyn Courchene	351	4.60	-3.95	$356.19
Total valid votes		7,638	99.23	-0.08	
Rejected		59	0.77		
Eligible voters / turnout		14,053	54.77	-4.41	
Source(s) Source: Manitoba. Chief Electoral Officer (2011). Statement of Votes for the 40th Provincial General Election, October 4, 2011 (PDF) (Report). Winnipeg: Elections Manitoba. "Election Returns: 40th General Election". Elections Manitoba. 2011.

2007 Manitoba general election
Party	Candidate	Votes	%	±%	Expenditures
New Democratic	Greg Dewar	4,584	55.64	-7.05	$16,897.63
Progressive Conservative	Gordie Dehn	2,951	35.82	+18.61	$20,947.84
Liberal	Karen Keppler	704	8.54	-11.56	$10,032.84
Total valid votes		8,239	99.31	+0.10	
Rejected		57	0.69		
Eligible voters / turnout		14,018	59.18	+4.98	
Source(s) Source: Manitoba. Chief Electoral Officer (2007). Statement of Votes for the 39th Provincial General Election, May 22, 2007 (PDF) (Report). Winnipeg: Elections Manitoba.

2003 Manitoba general election
Party	Candidate	Votes	%	±%
New Democratic	Greg Dewar	4,580	62.69	8.34
Liberal	Jack Jonasson	1,469	20.11	8.36
Progressive Conservative	Doug Neal	1,257	17.21	-16.69
Total valid votes		7,306	99.21	+0.01
Rejected		58	0.79	
Eligible voters / Turnout		13,512	54.50	-18.88
Source(s) Source: Manitoba. Chief Electoral Officer (2003). Statement of Votes for the 38th Provincial General Election, June 3, 2003 (PDF) (Report). Winnipeg: Elections Manitoba.

1999 Manitoba general election
Party	Candidate	Votes	%	±%	Expenditures
New Democratic	Greg Dewar	5,376	54.35	+10.58	$645.00
Progressive Conservative	Barry Uskiw	3,353	33.90	-1.42	$30,085.86
Liberal	Joe Smolinski	1,162	11.75	-9.16	$10,422.27
Total valid votes		9,891	99.20	-0.43	
Rejected		80	0.80		
Eligible voters / turnout		13,589	73.38	-3.87	
Source(s) Source: Manitoba. Chief Electoral Officer (1999). Statement of Votes for the 37th Provincial General Election, September 21, 1999 (PDF) (Report). Winnipeg: Elections Manitoba.

1995 Manitoba general election
Party	Candidate	Votes	%	±%
New Democratic	Greg Dewar	4,758	43.77	+7.19
Progressive Conservative	Brian Ketcheson	3,839	35.32	+1.37
Liberal	Elmer Keryluk	2,273	20.91	-8.56
Total valid votes		10,870	99.63	-0.07
Rejected		40	0.37	
Eligible voters / Turnout		14,123	77.25	2.81
Source(s) Source: Manitoba. Chief Electoral Officer (1999). Statement of Votes for the 37th Provincial General Election, September 21, 1999 (PDF) (Report). Winnipeg: Elections Manitoba.

1990 Manitoba general election
Party	Candidate	Votes	%	±%
New Democratic	Greg Dewar	3,735	36.58	+2.93
Progressive Conservative	Russ Farrell	3,467	33.95	+4.92
Liberal	Gwen Charles	3,009	29.47	-5.88
Total valid votes		10,211	99.70	-0.21
Rejected		31	0.30	
Eligible voters / turnout		13,758	74.44	-6.01
New Democratic gain from Liberal		Swing		+4.41
Source(s) Source: Manitoba. Chief Electoral Officer (1999). Statement of Votes for the 37th Provincial General Election, September 21, 1999 (PDF) (Report). Winnipeg: Elections Manitoba.

1988 Manitoba general election
Party	Candidate	Votes	%	±%
Liberal	Gwen Charles	3,821	35.35	+24.40
New Democratic	Terry Sargeant	3,637	33.64	-21.28
Progressive Conservative	Eugene Kinaschuk	3,138	29.03	-4.33
Western Independence	Ruth Van Koeveringe	214	1.98	–
Total valid votes		10,810	99.91	+0.11
Rejected		10	0.09	
Eligible voters / turnout		13,448	80.46	+5.53
Liberal gain from New Democratic		Swing		+22.85
Source(s) Source: Manitoba. Chief Electoral Officer (1999). Statement of Votes for the 37th Provincial General Election, September 21, 1999 (PDF) (Report). Winnipeg: Elections Manitoba.

1986 Manitoba general election
Party	Candidate	Votes	%	±%
New Democratic	Howard Pawley	5,135	54.93	-9.17
Progressive Conservative	Eugene Kinaschuk	3,119	33.36	-1.05
Liberal	Gwen Charles	1,023	10.94	–
Progressive	Raye Porhownik	72	0.77	-0.72
Total valid votes		9,349	99.80	+0.07
Rejected		19	0.20	
Eligible voters / Turnout		12,502	74.93	-0.10
New Democratic hold		Swing		-4.06
Source(s) Source: Manitoba. Chief Electoral Officer (1999). Statement of Votes for the 37th Provincial General Election, September 21, 1999 (PDF) (Report). Winnipeg: Elections Manitoba.

1981 Manitoba general election
Party	Candidate	Votes	%	±%
New Democratic	Howard Pawley	5,626	64.10	13.44
Progressive Conservative	Eugene Kinaschuk	3,020	34.41	-9.31
Progressive	Max Hofford	131	1.49	–
Total valid votes		8,777	99.73	-0.10
Rejected		24	0.27	
Eligible voters / Turnout		11,730	75.03	-7.91
Source(s) Source: Manitoba. Chief Electoral Officer (1999). Statement of Votes for the 37th Provincial General Election, September 21, 1999 (PDF) (Report). Winnipeg: Elections Manitoba.

1977 Manitoba general election
Party	Candidate	Votes	%	±%
New Democratic	Howard Pawley	5,159	50.66	-7.39
Progressive Conservative	Tom Denton	4,452	43.72	+1.77
Liberal	Ed Motkaluk	573	5.63	–
Total valid votes		10,184	99.83	+0.64
Rejected		17	0.17	
Eligible voters / Turnout		12,299	82.94	+4.55
Source(s) Source: Manitoba. Chief Electoral Officer (1999). Statement of Votes for the 37th Provincial General Election, September 21, 1999 (PDF) (Report). Winnipeg: Elections Manitoba.

1973 Manitoba general election
Party	Candidate	Votes	%	±%
New Democratic	Howard Pawley	4,745	58.05	+4.66
Progressive Conservative	John Linney	3,429	41.95	+9.45
Total valid votes		8,174	99.19	-0.31
Rejected		67	0.81	
Eligible voters / Turnout		10,513	78.39	+5.07
Source(s) Source: Manitoba. Chief Electoral Officer (1999). Statement of Votes for the 37th Provincial General Election, September 21, 1999 (PDF) (Report). Winnipeg: Elections Manitoba.

1969 Manitoba general election
Party	Candidate	Votes	%	±%
New Democratic	Howard Pawley	3,374	53.39	34.85
Progressive Conservative	Robert Stefan "Bud" Oliver	2,054	32.50	-5.41
Liberal	George S. Sigurdson	835	13.21	-25.54
Independent	Thomas Norquay	57	0.90	–
Total valid votes		6,320	99.50	+0.05
Rejected		32	0.50	
Eligible voters / Turnout		8,663	73.32	+5.18
Source(s) Source: Manitoba. Chief Electoral Officer (1999). Statement of Votes for the 37th Provincial General Election, September 21, 1999 (PDF) (Report). Winnipeg: Elections Manitoba.

1966 Manitoba general election
Party	Candidate	Votes	%	±%
Liberal	Thomas P. Hillhouse	1,832	38.76	-11.22
Progressive Conservative	Sydney S. Sarbit	1,792	37.91	1.64
New Democratic	Alan Bruce Cooper	876	18.53	–
Social Credit	Jens H. Magnusson	227	4.80	-8.95
Total valid votes		4,727	99.45	+1.32
Rejected		26	0.55	
Eligible voters / Turnout		6,975	68.14	+0.31
Source(s) Source: Manitoba. Chief Electoral Officer (1999). Statement of Votes for the 37th Provincial General Election, September 21, 1999 (PDF) (Report). Winnipeg: Elections Manitoba.

1962 Manitoba general election
Party	Candidate	Votes	%	±%
Liberal	Thomas P. Hillhouse	2,104	49.98	8.92
Progressive Conservative	Ben Massey	1,527	36.27	-2.93
Social Credit	Robert Luining	579	13.75	–
Total valid votes		4,210	98.13	-1.22
Rejected		80	1.87	
Eligible voters / Turnout		6,324	67.84	-8.19
Source(s) Source: Manitoba. Chief Electoral Officer (1999). Statement of Votes for the 37th Provincial General Election, September 21, 1999 (PDF) (Report). Winnipeg: Elections Manitoba.

1959 Manitoba general election
Party	Candidate	Votes	%	±%
Liberal–Progressive	Thomas P. Hillhouse	1,814	41.06	-3.99
Progressive Conservative	Ed Foster	1,732	39.20	2.85
Co-operative Commonwealth	William Bryce	872	19.74	5.35
Total valid votes		4,418	99.35	-0.21
Rejected		29	0.65	
Eligible voters / Turnout		5,849	76.03	+4.33
Source(s) Source: Manitoba. Chief Electoral Officer (1999). Statement of Votes for the 37th Provincial General Election, September 21, 1999 (PDF) (Report). Winnipeg: Elections Manitoba.

1958 Manitoba general election
Party	Candidate	Votes	%
Liberal–Progressive	Thomas P. Hillhouse	1,850	45.05
Progressive Conservative	David B. Veitch	1,493	36.35
Co-operative Commonwealth	Frank Kuzanski	591	14.39
Social Credit	Fred L. Luining	173	4.21
Total valid votes		4,107	99.56
Rejected		18	0.44
Eligible voters / Turnout		5,753	71.70
Source(s) Source: Manitoba. Chief Electoral Officer (1999). Statement of Votes for the 37th Provincial General Election, September 21, 1999 (PDF) (Report). Winnipeg: Elections Manitoba.

== Previous boundaries ==
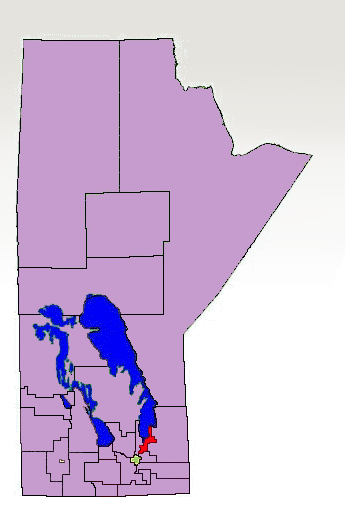
The 1998–2011 boundaries for Selkirk highlighted in red.

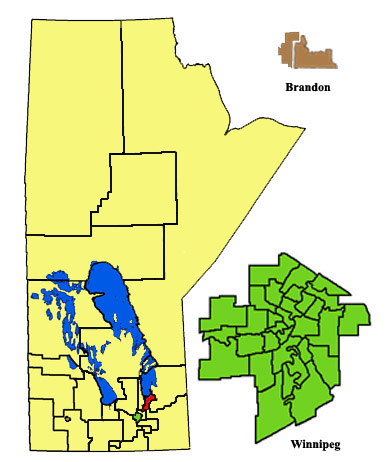
The 2011–2019 boundaries for Selkirk highlighted in red.

== See also ==
- List of Manitoba provincial electoral districts
- Canadian provincial electoral districts
