= Paul Boyd (journalist) =

American-based Canadian television journalist

- Born: Paul Graham Boyd; November 7, 1976 (age 49); Selkirk, Manitoba, Canada
- Education: Mount Royal College
- Occupation: Television journalist
- Years active: 1995–present
- Notable credit(s): Inside Edition correspondent (2001-2014); Inside Edition Weekend co-anchor (2003-2014)

Paul Graham Boyd (born November 7, 1976) is an American television journalist. Born in Canada, he moved to New York City in 2001 to work for the syndicated news magazine Inside Edition and became a U.S. citizen in 2010. He served as a co-anchor of Inside Edition Weekend until May 2014.

== Early life ==
Boyd was born in Selkirk, Manitoba. His family moved to Port Alberni, British Columbia, in the early 1980s where he and his two brothers were raised. He graduated as class valedictorian from Alberni District Secondary School in 1994.

Boyd has credited his high school media production program for sparking his interest in journalism when he was 16 years old. He appeared on a daily morning television show produced by students and broadcast throughout the school via closed-circuit television. One of his high school video segments was called "Fire Marshall Paul", an adaptation of the Jim Carrey character Fire Marshall Bill from the television show, In Living Color.

While a senior in high school, Boyd placed 2nd in a national video contest promoting safe driving. He was named top male vocalist at the West Coast Vocal Jazz Festival when he was 18 years old.

== Career ==
Boyd began his broadcasting career in 1995 working as a reporter with the CKUA Radio Network while attending Mount Royal College in Calgary, Alberta. He worked for his college radio and television stations.

In 1997, he graduated from Mount Royal College with a diploma in Broadcasting and received the prestigious Toby Towbridge Award as a top broadcasting student in his class. Shortly after graduation he was hired as a part-time sports reporter and fill-in anchor at CICT-TV, Calgary. Later that year he joined The Movie Show, an internationally syndicated entertainment program produced by Pyramid Productions.

In 1998 he was hired as a reporter for Calgary's 24-hour news channel Now-TV operated by Shaw Communications. He returned to his native Manitoba in 1999 to work as a reporter for CHMI-TV Winnipeg and was later promoted to co-anchor of the 10:00 pm newscast.

=== Inside Edition ===
Boyd joined Inside Edition as a correspondent in August 2001 and moved to New York City to start the job three weeks before the September 11 attacks, and investigated the terrorism links in Florida where several of the hijackers spent time in the days leading up to 9/11.

In the early stages of the war in Afghanistan, Boyd gained access to the dangerous tribal region on the border of Pakistan and Afghanistan, known as Waziristan, where he documented the hunt for Osama bin Laden in early 2002. Boyd was reporting for Inside Edition from Pakistan when journalist Daniel Pearl was kidnapped.

During his coverage of the 2003 invasion of Iraq, Boyd was interviewed live on CNN after discovering hand-written messages from Saddam Hussein in an abandoned Iraqi government office building. The most significant message uncovered by Inside Edition was written by Hussein on March 20, 2003, immediately following the first missile attack in Iraq at Dora Farms and read, "The frivolous criminal Bush and his missiles didn't hit my house. God has protected us." Hussein was captured nine months later.

Inside Edition dispatched Boyd to the scene of the London bombings on July 7, 2005. Later that year, he spent weeks documenting the human tragedy and destruction of Hurricane Katrina. In 2007, he reported from the campus of the Virginia Tech massacre the day 32 people were killed by a student gunman. In 2009, he reported from Texas on the day of the Fort Hood shooting that left 13 people dead. He covered the Casey Anthony Trial in 2011 and the trial of George Zimmerman in 2012. He also reported from the scene of the Boston Marathon Bombing in 2013.

Boyd reported extensively for Inside Edition during the U.S. presidential elections and national conventions in 2004, 2008 and 2012.

He was named co-anchor of Inside Edition Weekend in July 2003, succeeding Don Criqui. Boyd left Inside Edition in May 2014, after 13 years.

In 2016, Boyd joined WSOC-TV in Charlotte, North Carolina, as a reporter.

== Personal life ==
Paul Boyd became a U.S. citizen in 2010 and currently lives in Charlotte, North Carolina, with his family.
