= Terry Sargeant =

Canadian politician (born 1946)

Member of Parliament for Selkirk—Interlake
- In office May 22, 1979 – September 4, 1984
- Preceded by: riding created
- Succeeded by: Felix Holtmann

Personal details
- Born: May 19, 1946 (age 80) Melbourne, Australia
- Party: New Democratic Party
- Education: University of Manitoba
- Profession: Administrator, consultant, manager

Terence James Sargeant (born May 19, 1946) is a former Canadian politician and administrator. He served as a New Democratic Party member of the House of Commons of Canada for the riding of Selkirk—Interlake from 1979 to 1984.

== Early life and career ==
Born in Melbourne, Australia, Sargeant was a public policy consultant, personnel administrator, and office manager by career. He graduated from the University of Manitoba with a Bachelor of Arts in 1967.

== Political career ==
He represented the Manitoba riding of Selkirk—Interlake at which he was elected in the 1979 federal election and he was re-elected in the 1980 election. He lost his seat in the 1984 election to Felix Holtmann of the Progressive Conservative Party.

Following his defeat, Sargeant left national politics. In 1985, he became the director of research, planning, and development services for Manitoba's Northern Affairs Department.

In 1988, he sought to replace Howard Pawley as the MLA for Selkirk in the general election that year but was defeated by Liberal Candidate Gwen Charles by 184 votes.

== Later life ==
Sargeant earned a Bachelor of Laws from the University of Manitoba and was called to the Manitoba Bar in June 2000. He served on the university's board of governors for nine years.

Sargeant was the chair of the Manitoba Clean Environment Commission and the Appeal Commission of the Workers' Compensation Board. He also served as Chair of the Board of Governors of the University of Manitoba and he served on the board of the Winnipeg Folk Festival.

== Awards and recognition ==
In 2011, Sargeant was awarded an LL.D. (honoris causa) from the University of Manitoba.
