= Netley Creek Provincial Park =

Provincial park in Manitoba

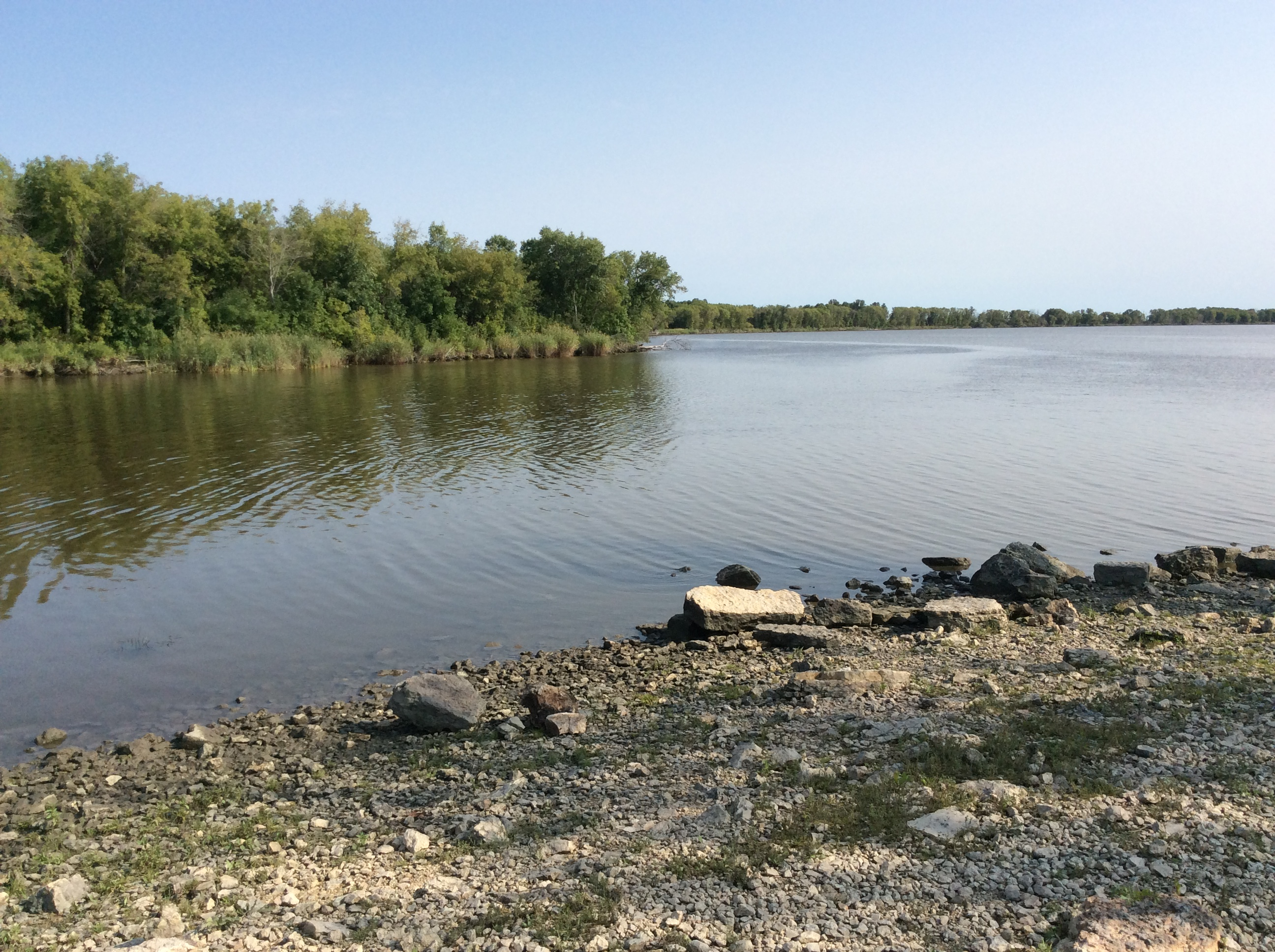
- Netley Creek and Red River

- Location within Manitoba
- Interactive map of Netley Creek Provincial Park
- Location: Interlake Region, Manitoba
- Nearest city: Selkirk, Manitoba
- Coordinates: 50°17′17″N 96°51′50″W
- Area: 1.524 ha (3.77 acres)
- Created: 1974

Netley Creek Provincial Park is a Manitoba provincial park on the west shore of the Red River north of Selkirk, Manitoba at the mouth of Netley Creek. It provides visitors with access to these waterways and adjacent Netley-Libau Marsh.

The area was declared a provincial park in 1974. It is 1.524 ha (3.77 acres) in size.

The park is in the Gimli ecodistrict of the Interlake Plain ecoregion part of the Boreal Plains ecozone.

The Red River is prone to flooding in the spring. The increasing severity of the impact of high water on the park infrastructure and neighbouring cottage leases resulted in a policy to allow much of the park to return to natural vegetation.

== See also ==
- List of protected areas of Manitoba
- List of provincial parks in Manitoba
