= East Selkirk =

Community in Manitoba

- Village
- Location within Manitoba
- Coordinates: 50°08′15″N 96°49′59″W
- Country: Canada
- Province: Manitoba
- Region: Interlake
- Incorporated: February 13, 1883
- Amalgamation: February 8, 1904
- Elevation: 227 m (745 ft)

Population (2016)
  - Total: 675
- Time zone: UTC-6 (Central Standard Time)
- Postal Code: R0E 0M0
- Area codes: 204, 431

East Selkirk is a community of 675 (2016 Census) in the Rural Municipality (RM) of St. Clements in the Canadian province of Manitoba. It is directly across the Red River from Selkirk.

The village of East Selkirk is connected to Winnipeg, about 41 kilometres (25 mi) away, via Highway 59 or Provincial Road 204

== History ==
The Town of East Selkirk was incorporated in 1883 and its first reeve was Francis Hay. East Selkirk saw a huge immigration boom in the latter part of the 19th century and the early part of the 20th century. The Round House, a large building made of Tyndall limestone, was situated next to the railway tracks and not only served as an immigration hall but also as the church, school and hospital. Many immigrants from Poland, Ukraine and other eastern-European countries passed through its doors and onward to their homesteads throughout the Interlake, but some remained to settle in the local area.

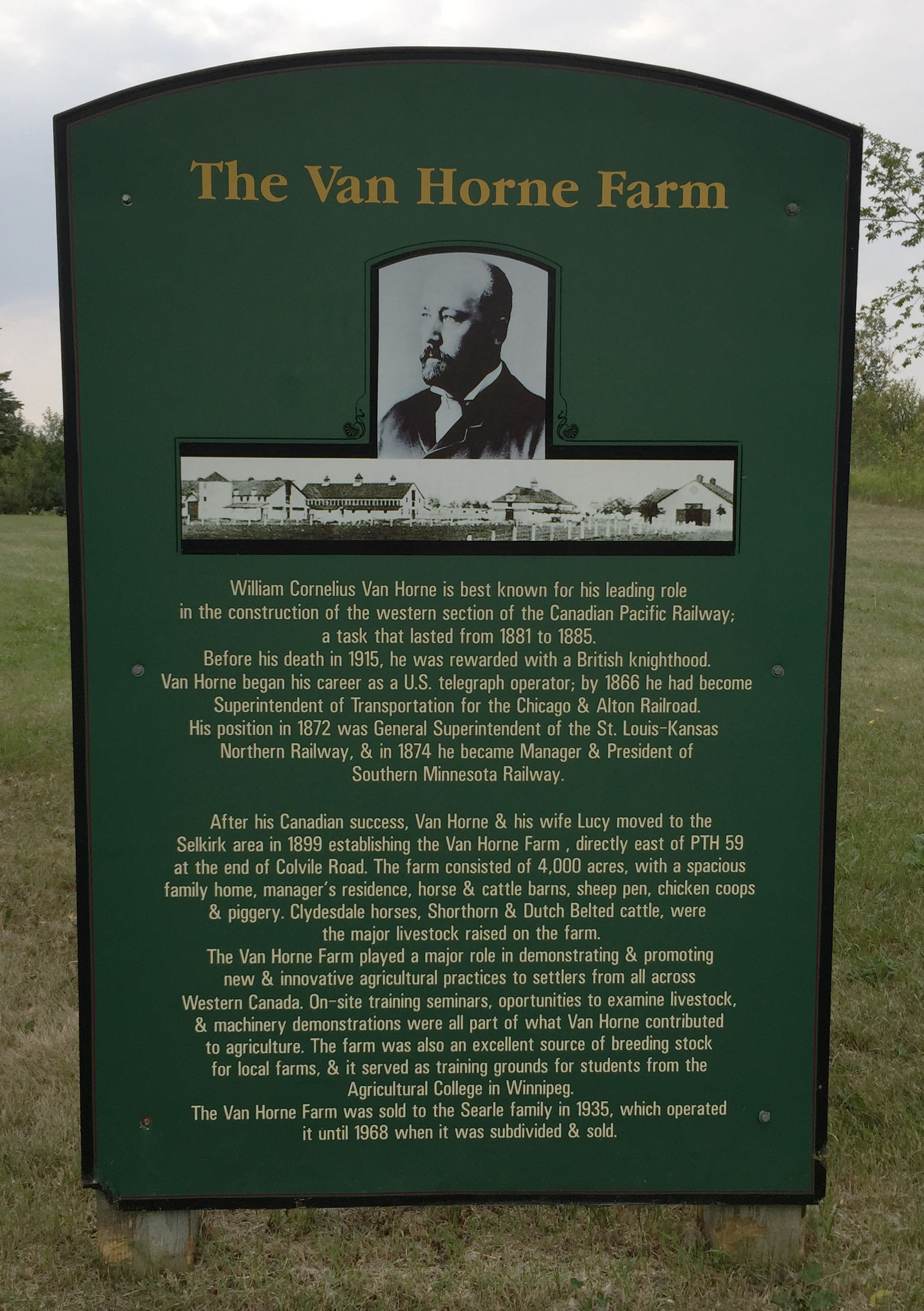
A photograph of a sign providing information about the Van Horne Farm and its place in the history of East Selkirk

East Selkirk was also home to the St. Peter's Reservation. It was here that Chief Peguis led his Saulteaux tribe in the early 19th century. Beginning in the late 1890s, the village of East Selkirk, as well as the town of Selkirk, Manitoba, Rural Municipality of St. Clements and St. Andrew's, Manitoba slowly began incorporating the lands of the Reservation and taxing the British-European occupants who held patents to river lots. This began a dispute that ultimately led the Federal Department of Indian Affairs to force the Saulteaux people out to clear way for the British-European settlers. Federal Agents came to the Reserve, bribed the Chief and Band Council, got them drunk and gave the entire tribe only one day to decide on the surrender agreement. In 1907, the surrender took place and the Saulteaux were moved to a remote corner of Lake Winnipeg to join the Peguis Reserve. This surrender was, and still is, considered illegal. Peguis First Nation finalized a land claim in 2008 that originated from this incident.

A bridge connecting the two communities was planned for construction in 1931, but the Depression delayed the project. In the fall of 1936 the bridge connecting the village of East Selkirk to the City of Selkirk was opened. At the time it cost more than C$300,000 to build.

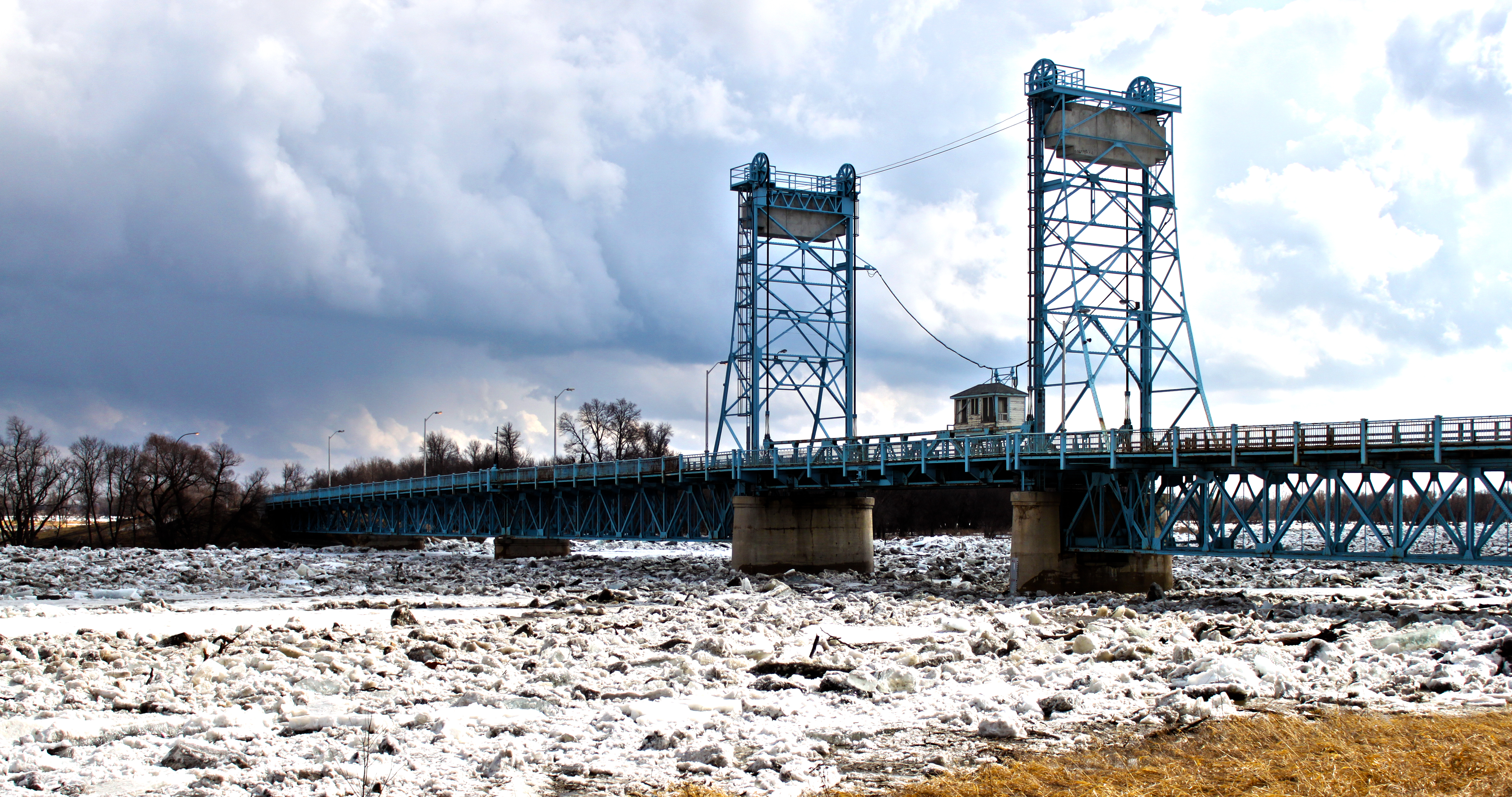
Selkirk Bridge connecting the City of Selkirk with Village of East Selkirk

The Town of East Selkirk was dissolved in 1904 and the community absorbed by the neighboring RM of St. Clements. The RM celebrated its centennial anniversary in 1884.

== Amenities ==
The village is home to an elementary school, Happy Thought School and a junior high, East Selkirk Middle School. The mascot of Happy Thought School is a husky and the mascot of East Selkirk Middle School is a hawk. The village is also home to the East Selkirk Recreation Association, a post office, gas station, and also two churches: St. Stanislaus Roman Catholic Church and the Blessed Virgin Mary Ukrainian Catholic Church.

The Central Manitoba Railway (CEMR), owned by Cando Rail Services Ltd. of Brandon, operates a 108 kilometres (67 mi) short line between East Selkirk and Carman, In 2018 they were given C$5.6 million to improve rail service between the two communities.

== Water ==
In the early 2000s, concerns about drinking water quality from existing underground aquifers in the East Selkirk area led to the village issuing boil water advisories. As the Water Treatment Plant and distribution pipes were upgraded, the boil water advisory was lifted in January 2016.

Source water serving the R.M. of St. Clements comes from a deep underground carbonate aquifer in operation since 2012. Two water pumps bring in water at the rate of 13 L/sec. A Water Treatment Plant is located within the village of East Selkirk at 1043 Kittson Rd. The underground Reservoir can store 600 m^{3} at a time. Eleven point eight kilometres of water distribution pipe serve 275 households.

A further C$1 million upgrade of the Water Treatment Plant in late 2017 meant that residents would not have to soften their water at their homes.

A 2017 study on the condition of the 30-year old Lockport Wastewater Treatment Plant indicated the best solution would be to connect Lockport to the East Selkirk Wastewater Treatment Plant via pipes along Henderson Hwy. between the two communities. This would allow for an additional 850 homes that could handle outflow from the East Selkirk Sewage Lagoon.
