= Selkirk, Manitoba =

City in Manitoba, Canada

Selkirk
- City
- City of Selkirk
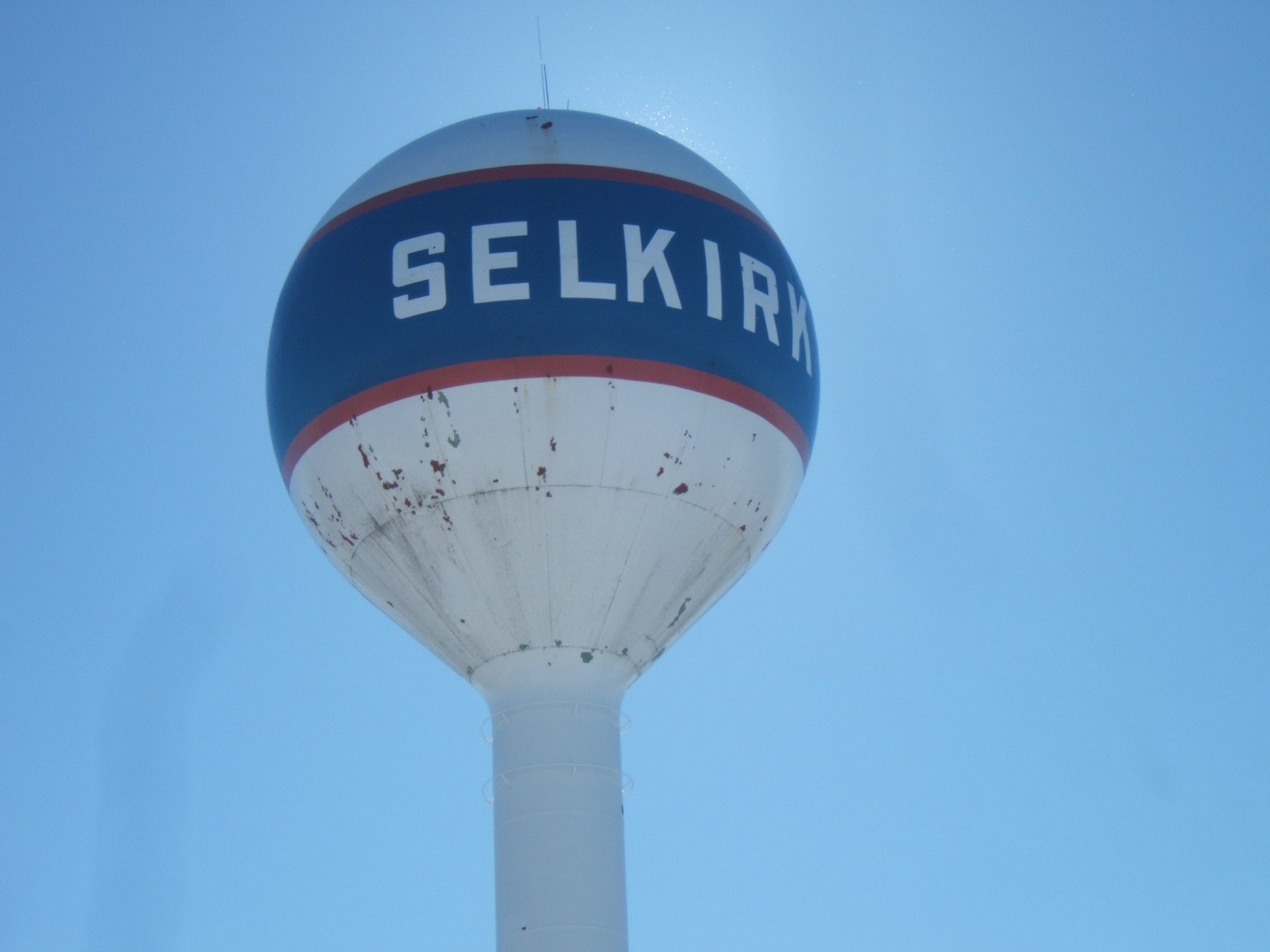
- Selkirk water tower

- Flag
- Nickname: Catfish Capital of the World
- City boundaries

- Location in Manitoba Selkirk (Canada)
- Coordinates: 50°08′37″N 96°53′02″W
- Country: Canada
- Province: Manitoba
- Region: Interlake and Winnipeg Metro
- Settled: 1813; 213 years ago
- Town: June 5, 1882; 144 years ago
- City: 1998; 28 years ago
- Named for: Thomas Douglas, 5th Earl of Selkirk

Government
  - City Mayor: Larry Johansson
  - Governing Body: Selkirk City Council
  - MP: James Bezan
  - MLA: Richard Perchotte

Area
  - City: 24.47 km^{2} (9.45 sq mi)
- Elevation: 225 m (738 ft)

Population (2021 Census)
  - City: 10,504 (7th)
  - Density: 429.3/km^{2} (1,112/sq mi)
  - Urban: 9,761
  - Urban density: 1,646.4/km^{2} (4,264/sq mi)
- Time zone: UTC−6 (CST)
  - Summer (DST): UTC−5 (CDT)
- Forward sortation area: R1A
- Area codes: 204, 431
- Website: www.myselkirk.ca

Selkirk is a city in the western Canadian province of Manitoba, located on the Red River about 22 kilometres (14 mi) northeast of Winnipeg, the provincial capital. It has a population of 10,504 as of the 2021 census.

The mainstays of the local economy are tourism, a steel mill, and a psychiatric hospital. A vertical lift bridge over the Red River connects Selkirk with the smaller town of East Selkirk. The city is connected to Winnipeg via Highway 9 and is served by the Canadian Pacific Railway.

The city was named in honour of the Scotsman Thomas Douglas, 5th Earl of Selkirk, who obtained the grant to establish a colony in the Red River area in 1813.

== History ==
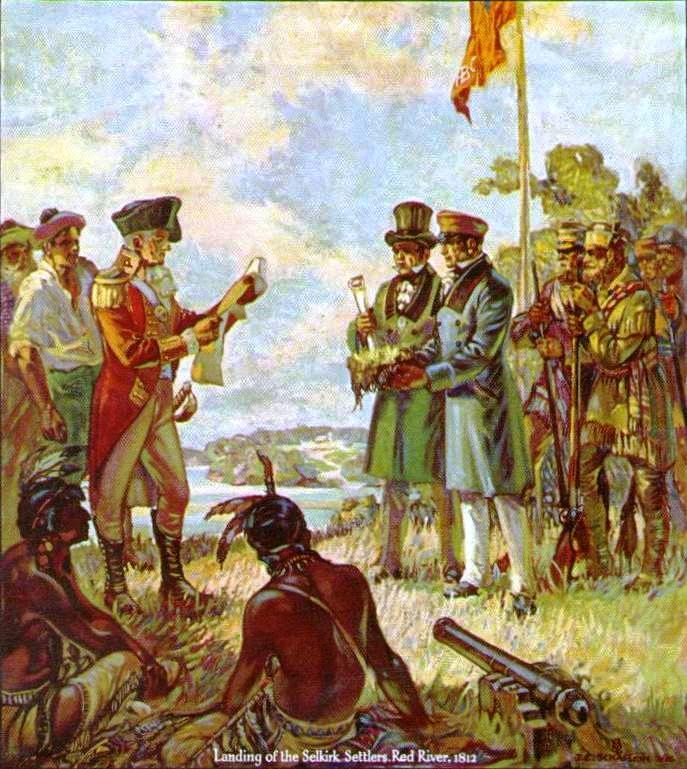
Landing of the Selkirk Settlers, Red River, 1812

The present-day city is near the centre of the 160,000-square-mile (410,000 km^{2}) area purchased by the Earl of Selkirk from the Hudson's Bay Company. The first settlers of the Red River Colony arrived in 1813. Although the settlers negotiated a treaty with the Saulteaux Indians of the area, the commercial rivalry between the Hudson's Bay Company and the North West Company gave rise to violent confrontations between the settlers and the trading companies. In recognition of the Earl's importance in bringing settlers to the region, the town was named Selkirk and incorporated in 1882.

== Economy ==
=== Entertainment ===
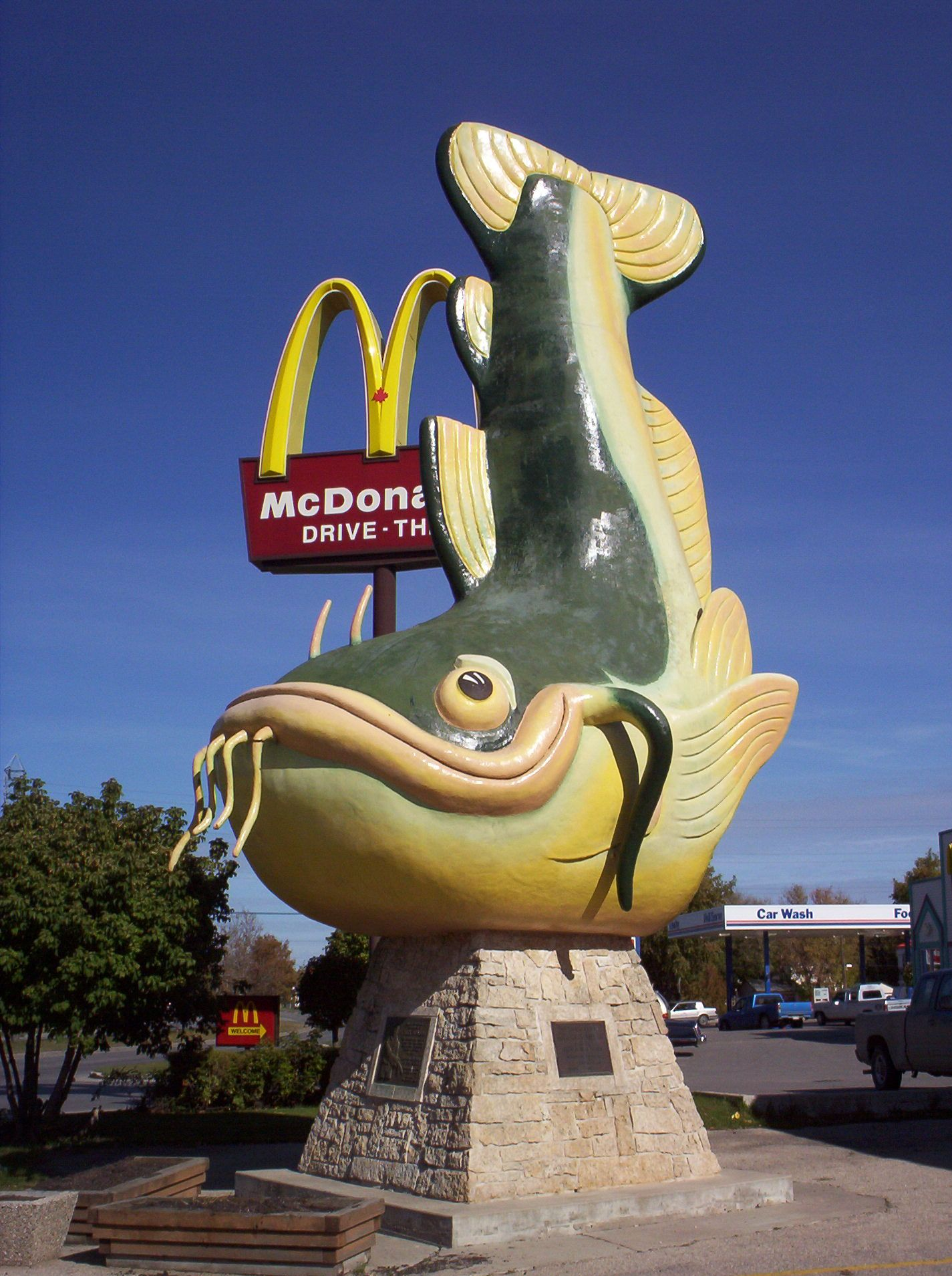
Chuck The Channel Cat

Selkirk is advertised as the Catfish Capital of the World due to the large amounts of catfish in the nearby Red River. This nickname was part of an advertising campaign to attract American anglers to fish for trophy-sized catfish. Selkirk is also home to Chuck the Channel Cat, a fiberglass statue of a catfish that measures 25 feet (7.6 m) long. The catfish was named after local sport fisherman Chuck Norquay, who drowned while doing what he loved most: fishing in the Red River. After Chuck was built in 1986, the town council decided to place Chuck in front of Smitty's Restaurant on Main Street.

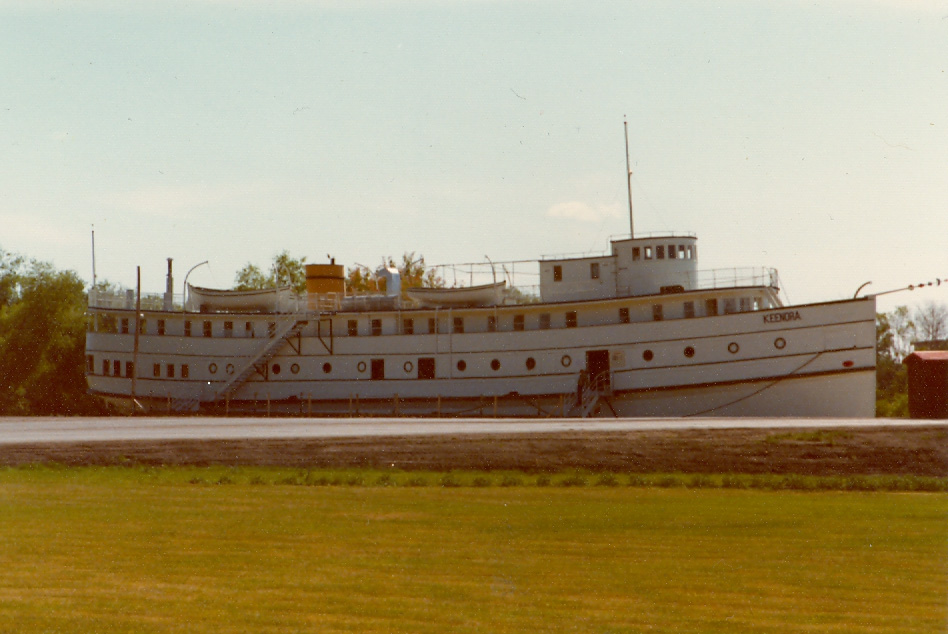
The Keenora in the Marine Museum of Manitoba

The Marine Museum of Manitoba, a collection of historical marine artifacts of Lake Winnipeg and the Red River area, is located in Selkirk. Selkirk is also the site of a Canadian Coast Guard base.

The yearly Selkirk Fair and Rodeo is held to celebrate the area's agricultural history. It celebrated its 130th anniversary in 2008.

=== Employment ===
The Selkirk Mental Health Centre, the largest mental health facility in the province, is a major employer in the city. It is surrounded by a park-like campus on the outskirts of the city.

Gerdau, owned by Gerdau S.A. of Porto Alegre, Brazil, operates a steel minimill in Selkirk. This steel mill (known locally as MRM or "The Manitoba Rolling Mills") is another major employer.

Selkirk has three community newspapers: The Interlake Enterprise, The Selkirk Record, and The Selkirk Journal.

== Sports ==
Selkirk is home to the Selkirk Steelers of the Manitoba Junior Hockey League, who play in the Selkirk Recreation Complex. Selkirk is also home to the Selkirk Fishermen of the Capital Region Junior Hockey League.

Selkirk has hosted major events in conjunction with the city of Winnipeg, such as select games of the 2007 Women's World Ice Hockey Championships. In 2009, Selkirk was host to the Telus Cup, Canada's national midget hockey championship, with the Winnipeg Thrashers as the host team. The Notre Dame Hounds defeated the Calgary Buffaloes 4–0 in the gold medal game, which was broadcast live from Selkirk on TSN.

Selkirk is also the home of the Selkirk Curling Club which has hosted numerous curling events, including the Masters Grand Slam of Curling in 2014, Canadian Junior Curling Championships in 1997 and the Viterra/Safeway Select Manitoba Men's Provincial Curling Championships.

== Government and politics ==
Selkirk is governed by a mayor and six councillors who are elected by residents. As of the 2022 election the current mayor of Selkirk is Larry Johannson. The current Selkirk city councillors are Lorie Fiddler (deputy mayor), Kelly Cook, April Smith, Darlene Swiderski, and Doug Poirier.

Selkirk is represented in the Legislative Assembly of Manitoba (as the Selkirk provincial electoral district) by Progressive Conservative MLA, Richard Perchotte, and in the House of Commons of Canada (as part of the Selkirk-Interlake-Eastman riding) by Conservative MP, James Bezan.

== Geography ==
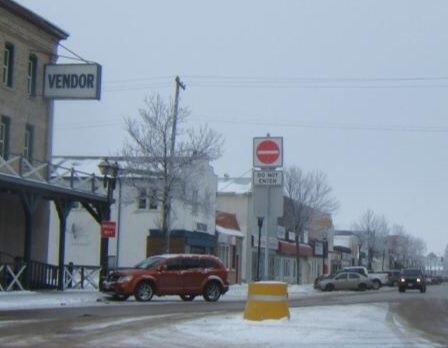
Downtown Selkirk

Selkirk is located in the Interlake Region of Manitoba, about 22 km northeast of the provincial capital Winnipeg on the Red River. A vertical lift bridge over the Red River connects Selkirk with the smaller town of East Selkirk. The city mostly borders the Rural Municipality of St. Andrews, except to the east, where it borders the Rural Municipality of St. Clements across the Red River. The terrain is extremely flat with fields of wheat and canola surrounding the city.

=== Climate ===
Due to Selkirk's position on the edge of the Canadian Prairies, there is a moderate 510.4 mm (20.1 inches) of precipitation annually. Selkirk has a climate with four very distinct seasons. A general year will include warm (sometimes hot) summers, cold winters, and a comfortable spring and autumn. Selkirk has recorded a temperature as high as 38.5 °C (101.3 °F) in June 1995 and a temperature as low as −45.6 °C (−50.1 °F) in February 1966. Selkirk has 21 days with snowfall per year, from about November (sometimes as early as September or October) to around April (sometimes as late as May).

Climate data for Selkirk, Manitoba (1971–2000 data)
Month	Jan	Feb	Mar	Apr	May	Jun	Jul	Aug	Sep	Oct	Nov	Dec	Year
Record high °C (°F)	6.1 (43.0)	8.5 (47.3)	17.5 (63.5)	34 (93)	36.5 (97.7)	38.5 (101.3)	36.1 (97.0)	38 (100)	37.5 (99.5)	28 (82)	22.2 (72.0)	9 (48)	38.5 (101.3)
Mean daily maximum °C (°F)	−12.8 (9.0)	−8.4 (16.9)	−1.1 (30.0)	9.7 (49.5)	18.5 (65.3)	22.9 (73.2)	25.5 (77.9)	24.6 (76.3)	18 (64)	10.3 (50.5)	−1.2 (29.8)	−9.8 (14.4)	8 (46)
Daily mean °C (°F)	−17.5 (0.5)	−13.3 (8.1)	−5.9 (21.4)	4.1 (39.4)	12.4 (54.3)	17.3 (63.1)	19.3 (66.7)	18.7 (65.7)	12.5 (54.5)	5.5 (41.9)	−4.9 (23.2)	−14.1 (6.6)	2.9 (37.2)
Mean daily minimum °C (°F)	−22.1 (−7.8)	−18.2 (−0.8)	−10.7 (12.7)	−1.5 (29.3)	6.2 (43.2)	11.6 (52.9)	14.1 (57.4)	12.8 (55.0)	7 (45)	0.7 (33.3)	−8.5 (16.7)	−18.5 (−1.3)	−2.3 (27.9)
Record low °C (°F)	−41.1 (−42.0)	−45.6 (−50.1)	−33.3 (−27.9)	−23.9 (−11.0)	−10 (14)	−2.2 (28.0)	2.8 (37.0)	2 (36)	−6.7 (19.9)	−18 (0)	−35 (−31)	−37.8 (−36.0)	−45.6 (−50.1)
Average precipitation mm (inches)	16 (0.6)	11.3 (0.44)	21.8 (0.86)	26 (1.0)	56.6 (2.23)	93 (3.7)	79.6 (3.13)	74.5 (2.93)	57.5 (2.26)	35.6 (1.40)	23.7 (0.93)	14.7 (0.58)	510.4 (20.09)
Source: Environment Canada

== Water ==
The city of Selkirk gets its water from four carbonate aquifer wells in the city and two in the RM of St. Andrews. Water is then cleaned at the Selkirk Water Treatment Plant before being sent out to distribution lines. Five of the six wells are deep, while the Tower well is shallower. Because of this water from the Tower well needs more maintenance. McLean Well (drilled in 1959), Christie Well 1 (drilled in 1968. used only in emergencies), Rosser Well (drilled in 1987), Tower Well (1997), Christie Well 2 (drilled in 2015), Render Well North (drilled in 2017), Render Well South (drilled in 2017).

The Selkirk Water Tower is a prominent feature of the area. It was constructed in 1961 as a replacement for a previous tank built in 1909. The current water tower has a maximum storage capacity of 946,000 litres. In March 2020, the city announced a local design competition that would see the repainting of the 40 m (130 ft) structure.

In August 2016, the city of Selkirk partnered with the provincial and federal governments to cost share upgrades to its water treatment and distribution infrastructure. The Selkirk project was estimated to cost C$35.2 million and would include a new water treatment plant. The expanded system would be large enough to serve St. Andrews and the Lower Fort Garry Historic Park.

Construction began in August 2018 to replace the aging wastewater facility built in 1976. The new one would cost C$35.9 million, the largest capital works project in the City's history, with construction expected to be completed by January 2020.

== Demographics ==
Historical population
Year	Pop.	±%
1901	2,188	—
1911	2,977	+36.1%
1921	3,726	+25.2%
1931	4,486	+20.4%
1941	4,915	+9.6%
1951	6,218	+26.5%
1961	8,576	+37.9%
1981	10,037	+17.0%
1986	10,013	−0.2%
1996	9,881	−1.3%
2001	9,752	−1.3%
2006	9,515	−2.4%
2011	9,834	+3.4%
2016	10,278	+4.5%
2021	10,504	+2.2%

In the 2021 Census of Population conducted by Statistics Canada, Selkirk had a population of 10,504 living in 4,417 of its 4,643 total private dwellings, a change of 2.2% from its 2016 population of 10,278. With a land area of 24.47 km^{2} (9.45 sq mi), it had a population density of 429.3/km^{2} (1,111.8/sq mi) in 2021.

The median household income in 2005 for Selkirk was $42,502, which is below the Manitoba provincial average of $47,875.

Panethnic groups in the City of Selkirk (2001−2021)
Panethnic group	2021		2016		2011		2006		2001	
Panethnic group	Pop.	%	Pop.	%	Pop.	%	Pop.	%	Pop.	%
European (Note: Statistic includes all persons that did not make up part of a visible minority or an indigenous identity.)	5,745	57.83%	5,995	62.77%	5,910	63.93%	6,345	70.42%	7,090	77.15%
Indigenous	3,490	35.13%	3,315	34.71%	3,175	34.34%	2,465	27.36%	1,970	21.44%
South Asian	390	3.93%	60	0.63%	0	0%	30	0.33%	40	0.44%
Southeast Asian (Note: Statistic includes total responses of "Filipino" and "Southeast Asian" under visible minority section on census.)	135	1.36%	95	0.99%	10	0.11%	65	0.72%	35	0.38%
African	95	0.96%	10	0.1%	70	0.76%	55	0.61%	0	0%
East Asian (Note: Statistic includes total responses of "Chinese", "Korean", and "Japanese" under visible minority section on census.)	0	0%	40	0.42%	10	0.11%	10	0.11%	15	0.16%
Latin American	0	0%	15	0.16%	0	0%	15	0.17%	0	0%
Middle Eastern (Note: Statistic includes total responses of "West Asian" and "Arab" under visible minority section on census.)	0	0%	10	0.1%	30	0.32%	10	0.11%	0	0%
Other/multiracial (Note: Statistic includes total responses of "Visible minority, n.i.e." and "Multiple visible minorities" under visible minority section on census.)	20	0.2%	15	0.16%	0	0%	10	0.11%	0	0%
Total responses	9,935	94.58%	9,550	92.92%	9,245	94.01%	9,010	94.69%	9,190	94.24%
Total population	10,504	100%	10,278	100%	9,834	100%	9,515	100%	9,752	100%
Note: Totals greater than 100% due to multiple origin responses

== Places of interest ==
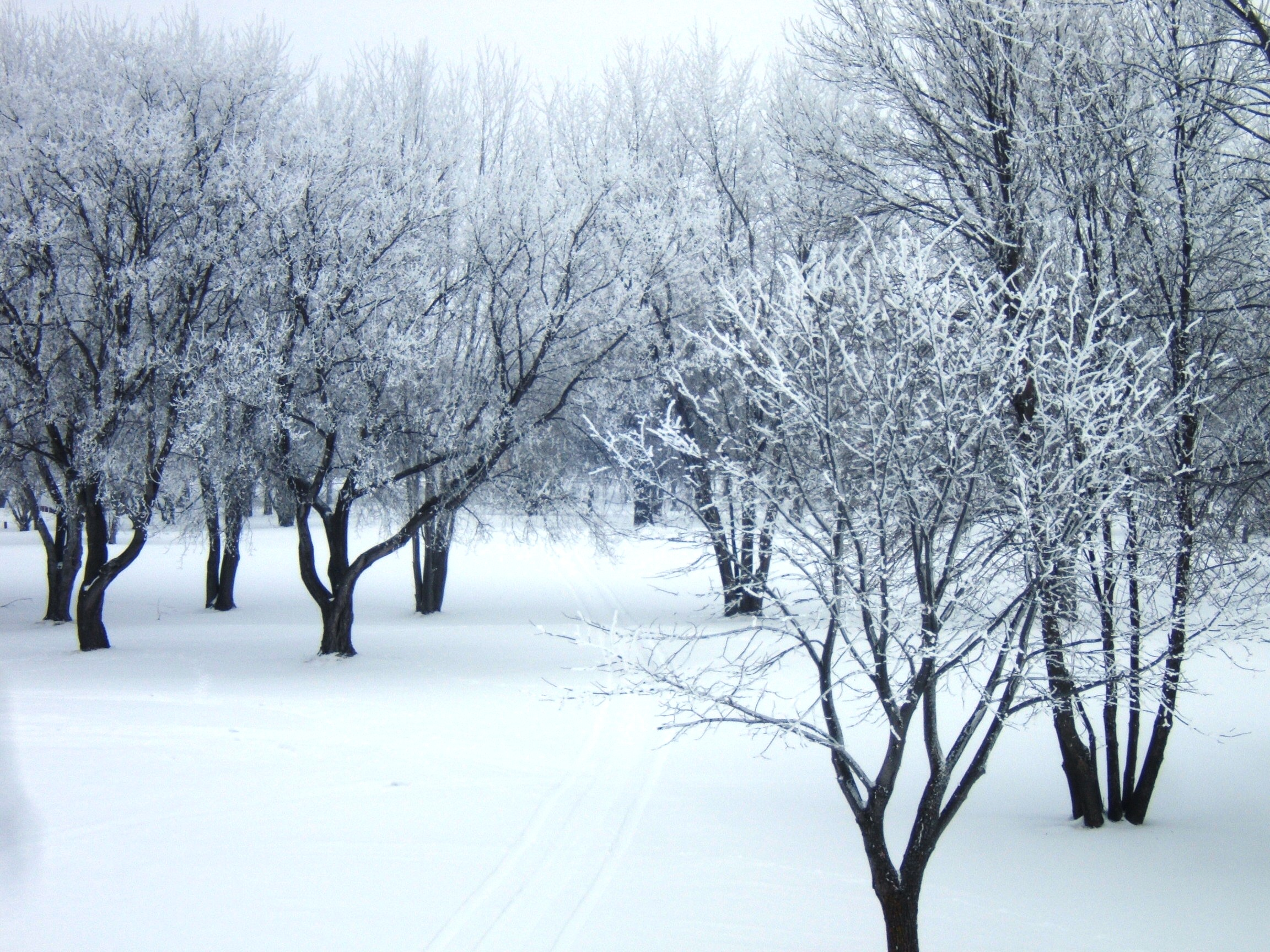
Selkirk Park in February 2012

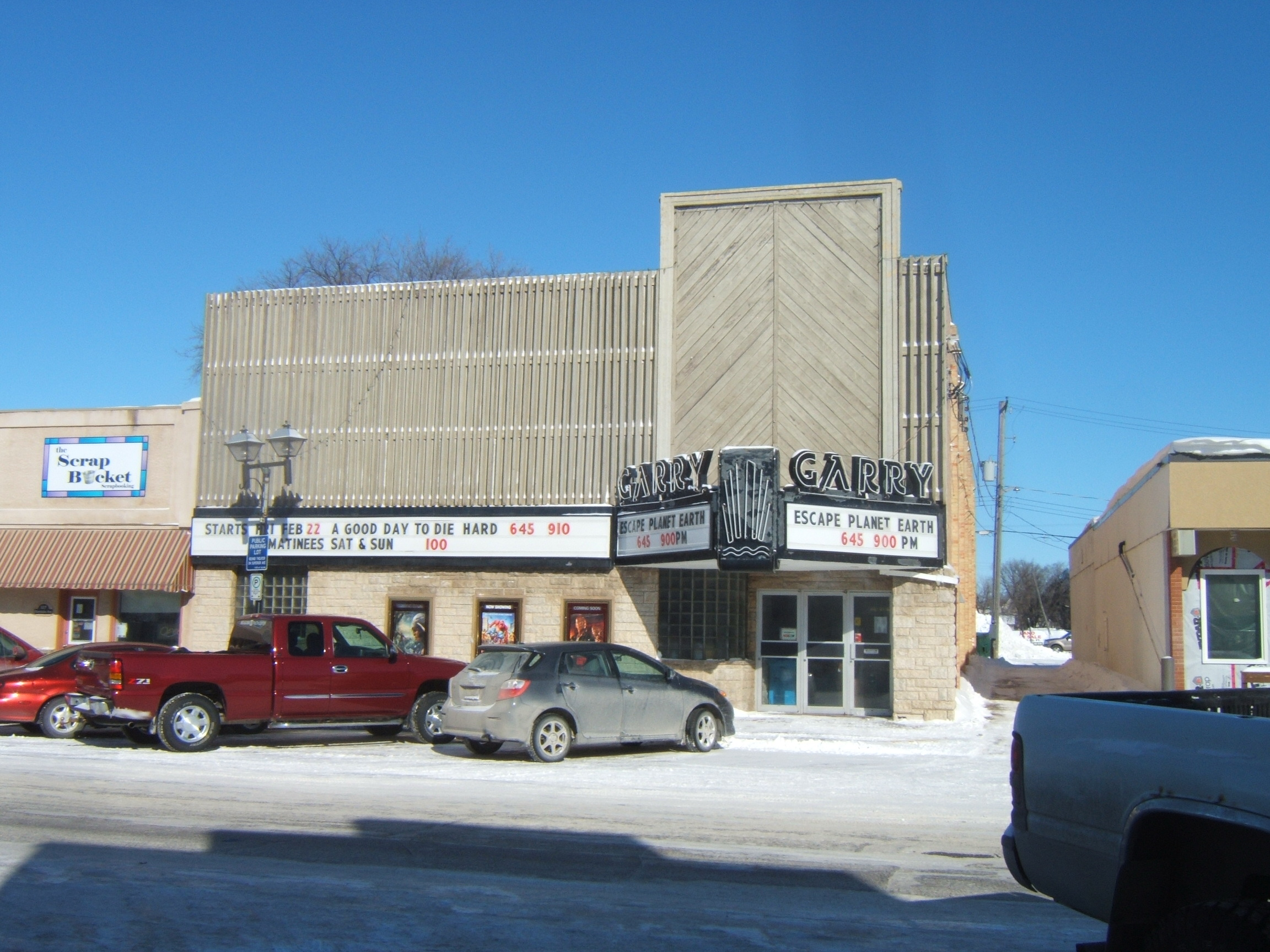
Garry Theatre

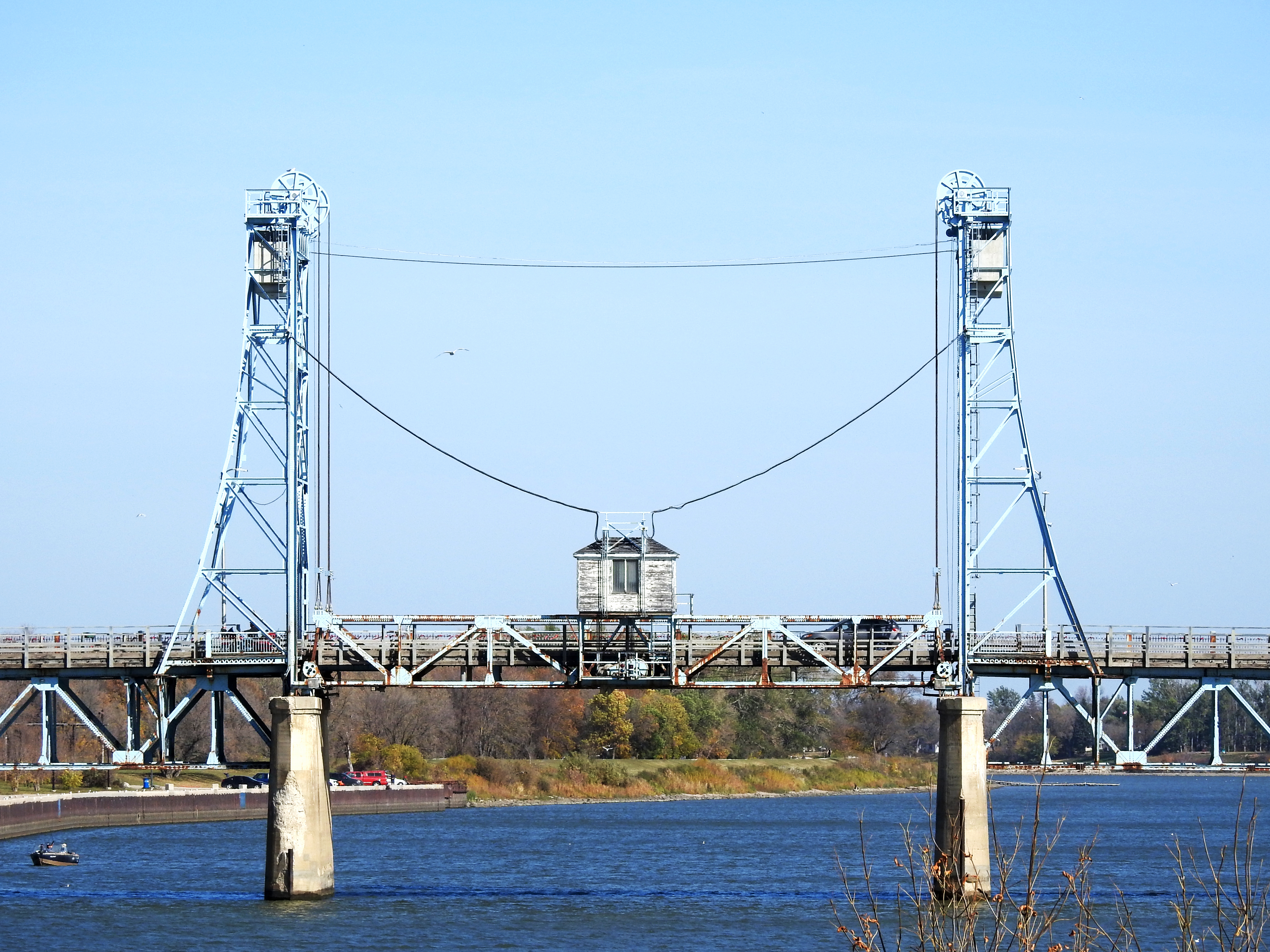
Lift span of the Selkirk Lift Bridge, October 2021

- Selkirk—Red River former federal electoral district
- Selkirk Water Aerodrome
- Selkirk Airport
- Red River Trails
- Fort Maurepas (Canada) fur trading post built 1734 near the present town
- Selkirk Lift Bridge
- Lower Fort Garry national historic site, five kilometres south of Selkirk

== Notable people ==
=== Sports ===
- Terry Ball – hockey player
- Rich Chernomaz – hockey player
- Kerri Einarson – curler
- Paul Goodman – hockey player
- Alfie Michaud – hockey player (goaltender)
- Andrew Murray – hockey player
- Harry Oliver – hockey player
- Bullet Joe Simpson – soldier, hockey player and coach who was flag bearer for Canada at 1932 Olympics
- Jimmy Skinner – hockey coach
- Neil Wilkinson – hockey player

=== Politicians ===
- David Bjornson – Member of Parliament 1988–1993
- Greg Dewar – Manitoba provincial politician
- Ron Fewchuk – Member of Parliament 1993–1997
- Ed Helwer – member of the Manitoba legislature 1988–2003
- Hugh McFadyen – Manitoba politician, MLA
- Howard Pawley – MLA Selkirk 1969–1988; Premier of Manitoba 1981–1988
- Sam Uskiw – Manitoba politician, born in East Selkirk

=== Other ===
- Trevor Boris – comedian
- Paul Boyd – currently broadcasting journalistic reporter for WSOC-TV
- Robert Atkinson Davis – businessman and politician, supported running the railway through Winnipeg instead of Selkirk
- The Farrell Bros. – rockabilly (music) group
- Goody Grace – singer and musician
- Sherisse Laurence – singer and entertainer
- Kevin Patterson – doctor, writer, grew up in Selkirk
- William Prince – musician
- Ellen Reid – keyboard player for the Canadian rock band Crash Test Dummies
- Michael Rowe – Canadian author and journalist, attended St. John's Cathedral Boys' School in Selkirk 1977–1981
- Niigaanwewidam James Sinclair, scholar
- Murray Sinclair, jurist, Senator and head of Truth and Reconciliation Commission of Canada
- John Tanner – explorer, guide, worked for the Selkirk colony
- Paul Thorlakson – soldier, surgeon, Order of Canada, co-founder of the Winnipeg Clinic
