= List of vertical-lift bridges =

This is a list of vertical-lift bridges.

== Australia ==
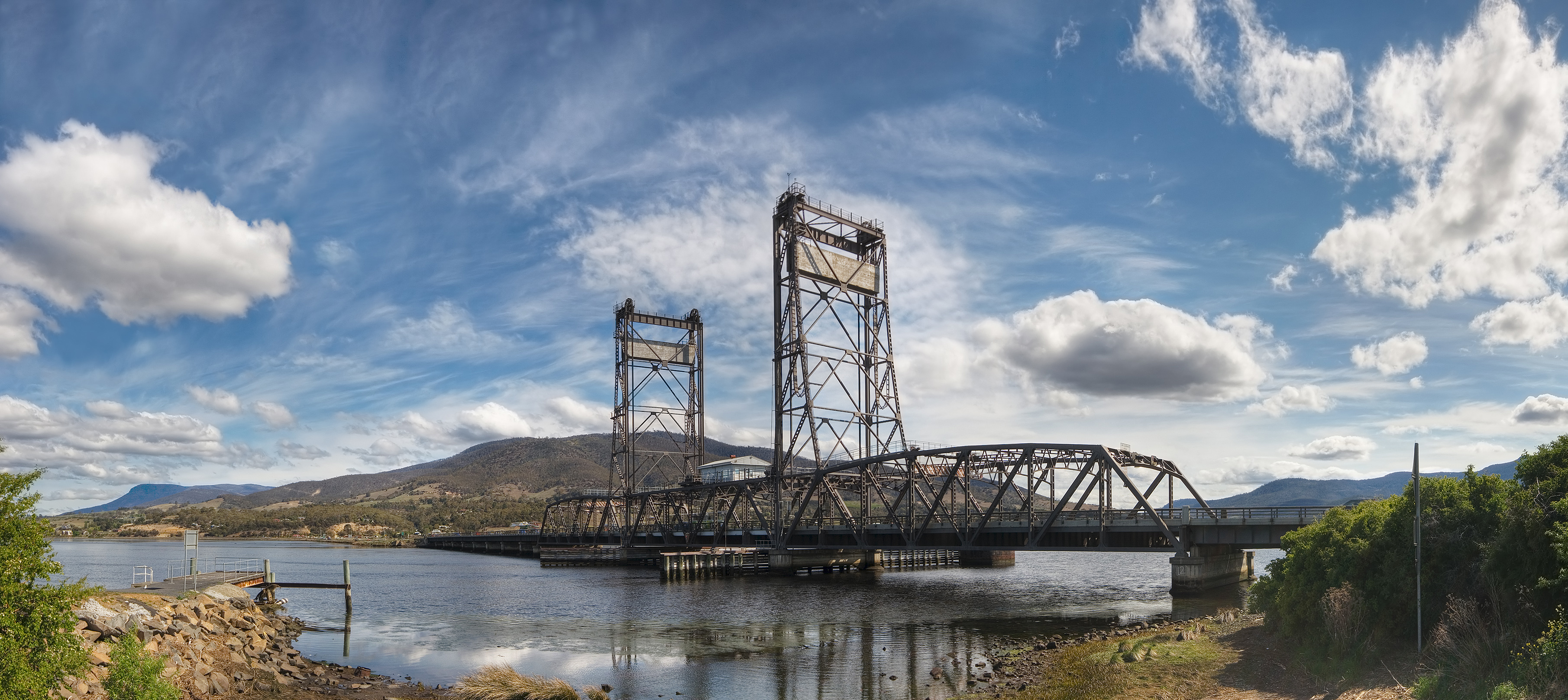
The Bridgewater Bridge, closed in 2025

- Abbotsford Bridge - road - Curlwaa, New South Wales and Yelta, Victoria- opened 1928
- Batemans Bay Bridge – road – Batemans Bay, New South Wales – opened 1956, demolished 2022
- Bridgewater Bridge – road & rail – Bridgewater, Tasmania – opened 1946, closed 2025
- Harwood Bridge – road – Harwood Island, New South Wales – opened 1966
- Hexham Bridge – road – Hexham, New South Wales – opened 1952
- Hobart Bridge – road – Hobart, Tasmania – opened 1943, closed 1964 and demolished afterwards
- Paringa Bridge - road & rail - Paringa, South Australia - opened 1927
- Ryde Bridge – road – Ryde, New South Wales – opened 1935, still used by road traffic but no longer lifts

== Belgium ==
- Budabrug^{NL} – road – zeekanaal Brussel-Schelde – opened 1955
- Europabrug^{NL} – road – zeekanaal Brussel-Schelde – opened 1972
- Verbrandebrug^{NL} – road – zeekanaal Brussel-Schelde – opened 1968
- Humbeekbrug^{NL} – road – zeekanaal Brussel-Willebroek – opened 1968
- Brielenbrug^{NL} – road – zeekanaal Brussel-Schelde – opened 1968
- Ringbrug^{NL} – road – zeekanaal Brussel-Willebroek – opened 1986
- Vredesbrug^{NL} – road – zeekanaal Brussel-Schelde – opened 1952

== Brazil ==
- Guaíba Bridge - road - Porto Alegre, Rio Grande do Sul - opened 1958

== Canada ==
- Bridges 5 (Glendale Avenue Bridge), 11 (Allanburg Bridge) and 21 (Clarence Street Bridge) on the Welland Canal, all built during the late 1920s as part of the Fourth Canal expansion project (1913–1932). In addition, there are also Bridges 13 (Main Street Bridge) and 17 (Dain City Railway Bridge) on the Welland Recreational Waterway (a former channel of the Welland Canal). However, these bridges have not been operational since 1973. Bridges 13 has had its counterweights removed while the machinery for Bridge 17 has been dismantled.
- Burlington Canal Lift Bridge, over the Burlington Canal, Burlington, Ontario. Information is available from Built 1962.
- Pretoria Bridge over the Rideau Canal in Ottawa, Ontario
- Selkirk Lift Bridge over the Red River in Selkirk, Manitoba
- Victoria Bridge over the Saint Lawrence River connecting Saint-Lambert and Montreal, Quebec.
- Second Narrows Bridge Vancouver, BC over Burrard Inlet (rail bridge).
- Okanagan Lake Bridge in Kelowna, BC across Okanagan Lake – replaced in 2008.
- Shippagan Bridge Shippagan, NB over Shippagan Bay.
- Sir Ambrose Shea Bridge, Placentia, NL. Built 1961.

== China ==
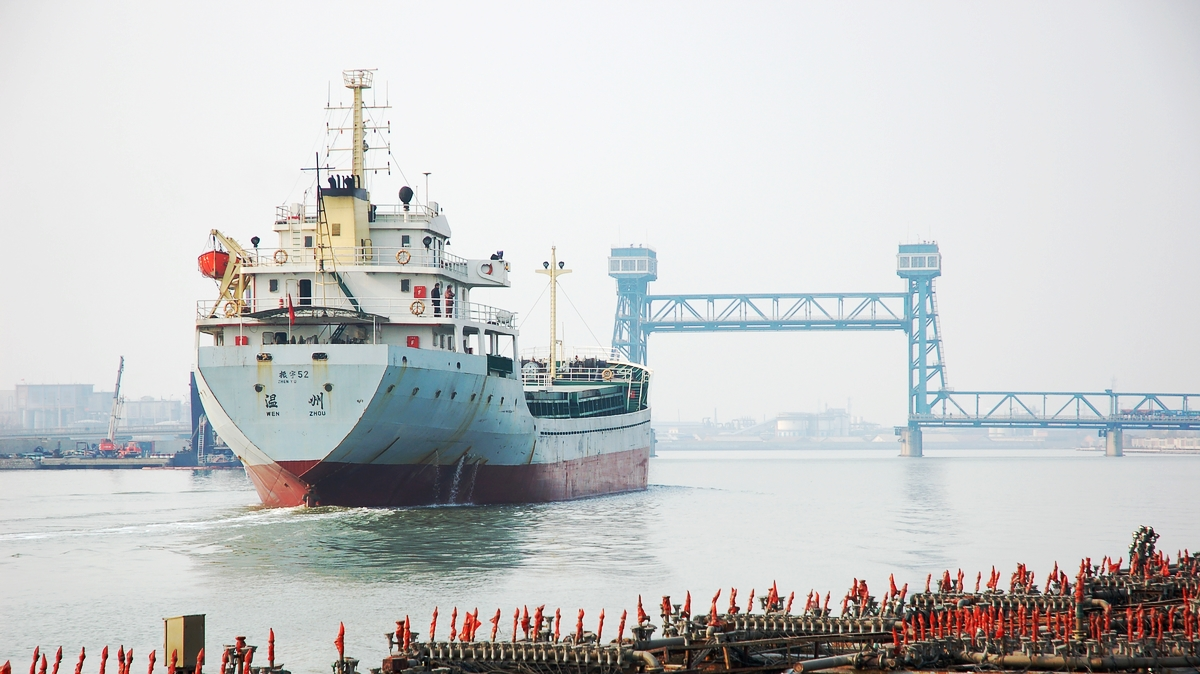
A ferry is crossing the lifted Haimen Bridge

- Haimen Bridge, across Hai River in Tianjin
- Ounan Bridge, across Ao River in Wenzhou (stopped lift function since 2016)
- Guangming Bridge, across Pearl River in Guangzhou

== France ==
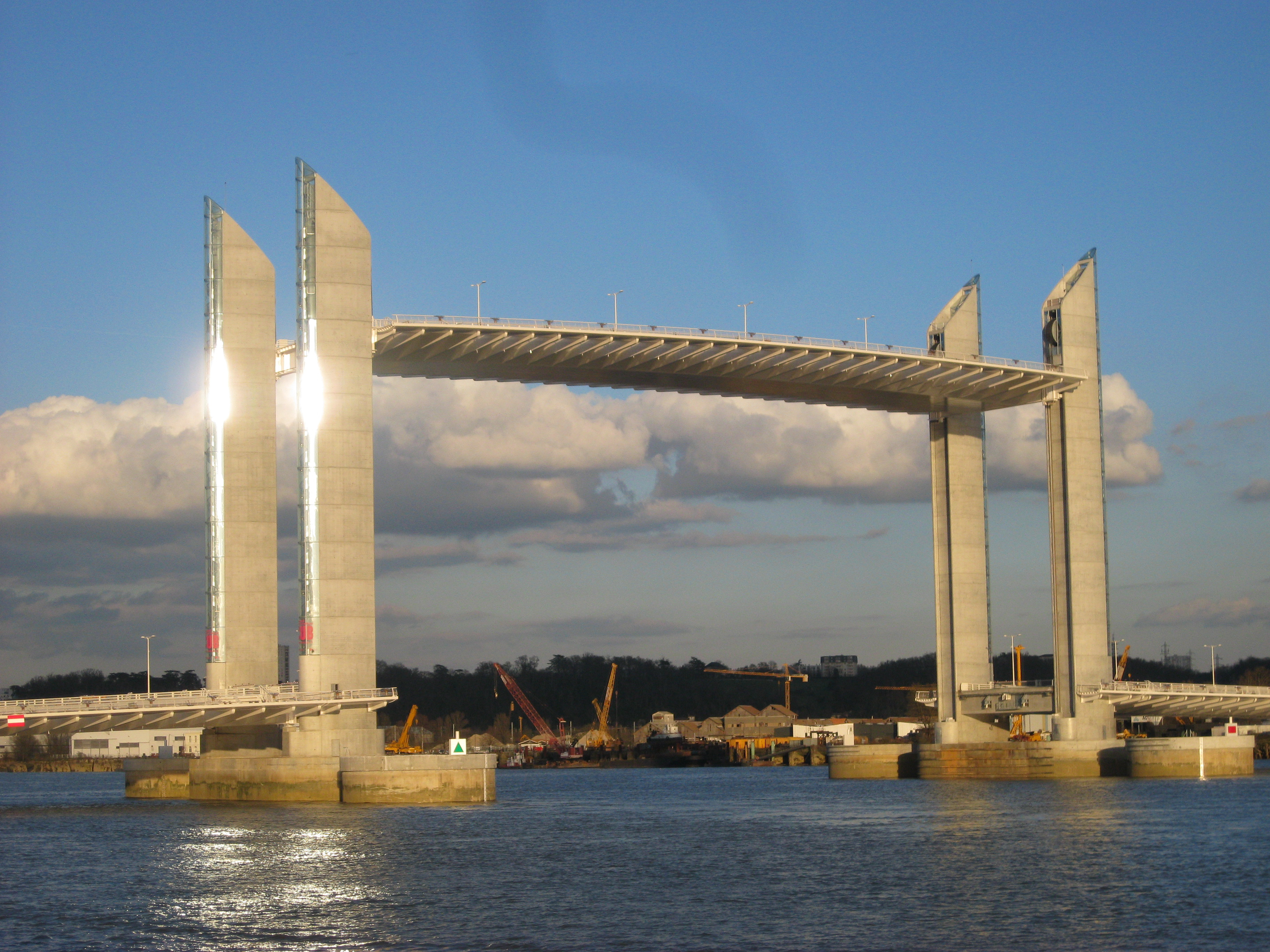
The Pont Jacques Chaban-Delmas's approx. 110-metre (360 ft) lift span is likely the longest in Europe, but that of the Pont Gustave-Flaubert is very nearly as long.

- Pont Gustave-Flaubert – crossing the Seine at Rouen, this lift bridge is the highest vertical-lift bridge in Europe, allowing ships up to 55 m tall to pass under it. It is 670 m long, with a span of 116 metres (Note: Structurae gives a length of 100 m). A striking design feature, the two road sections are mounted outside the central towers. The bridge was designed by François Gillard and Aymeric Zublena and opened to road traffic on 25 September 2008. It is named after the author Gustave Flaubert who was born in Rouen.
- Pont de Recouvrance – over the river Penfeld in Brest – road & tramway
- Pont Levant de Crimée^{FR} – over the Ourcq Canal; the last surviving vertical-lift bridge in Paris
- The Pont Jacques Chaban-Delmas, spanning the River Garonne in Bordeaux, was opened in March 2013. The central lift span is 117m long and can be lifted vertically up to 53m to let tall ships pass underneath. The bridge is 575m long with the central lift span weighing around 2,600 tonnes. Its width varies from 32 to 45m and it will be used by cars, trams, cyclists and pedestrians. It can handle 43,000 vehicles a day and will reduce traffic congestion in Bordeaux. Structurae gives a length of 110 m for the lift span, making it probably the longest vertical-lift span in Europe.

== Germany ==
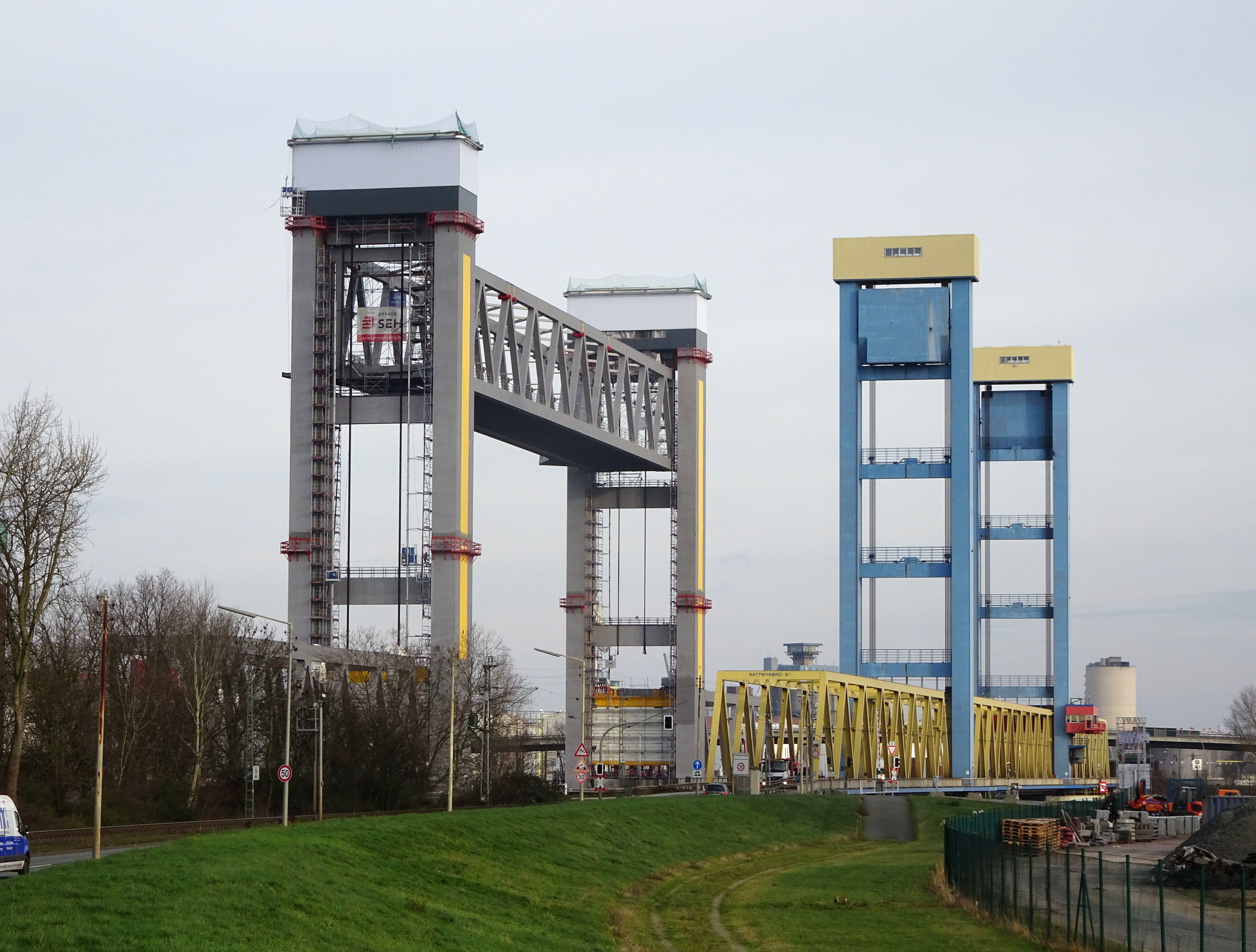
Kattwyk Bridges, in Hamburg, Germany, left bridge with its lift span raised

- Rethe Lift Bridge in Hamburg, from 1934, demolished in 2018
- Karnin Lift Bridge, Mecklenburg-Vorpommern
- Kattwyk Bridge, a pair of vertical-lift bridges in Hamburg, have a lift span 100 m long, one of the longest in Europe It's opened in a regular schedule every two hours.

== India ==
New Pamban Bridge – This railway bridge on Pamban channel opened in 2025, is located in the Indian state Tamil Nadu, and will connect mainland India with Rameshwaram town on Pamban Island. It spans a length of 2.07 kilometres (1.29 mi) and includes a 72 metres (236 ft) vertical lifting section. It is the first vertical lift sea bridge in all of South Asia.

== Indonesia ==
- Ampera Bridge – an automobile lift bridge located in Palembang that cross the Musi River. This bridge is still used by road vehicles but since 1970 never lift its road deck again. Eventually its counterweights removed in 1990.

== Italy ==
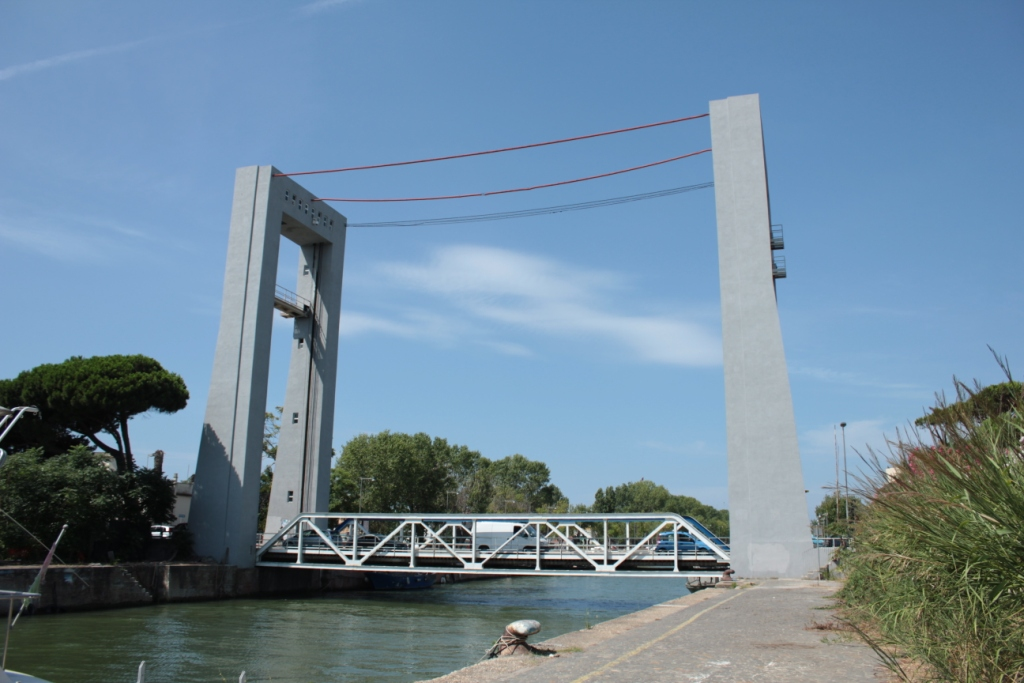
Ponte Due Giugno in Fiumicino, Italy

- Ponte Due Giugno^{ES} – road – Fiumicino, Rome– rebuilt in 1945

== Japan ==
- Chikugo River Lift Bridge – connecting Ōkawa, Fukuoka and Saga, Saga. Constructed as a railway bridge in 1935, it is 507 m long, with a central span 24 m long that weighs 48 t and rises 23 m. The railway closed in 1987, but the bridge reopened to pedestrians in 1996 and was designated an important cultural property in 2003.

== The Netherlands ==
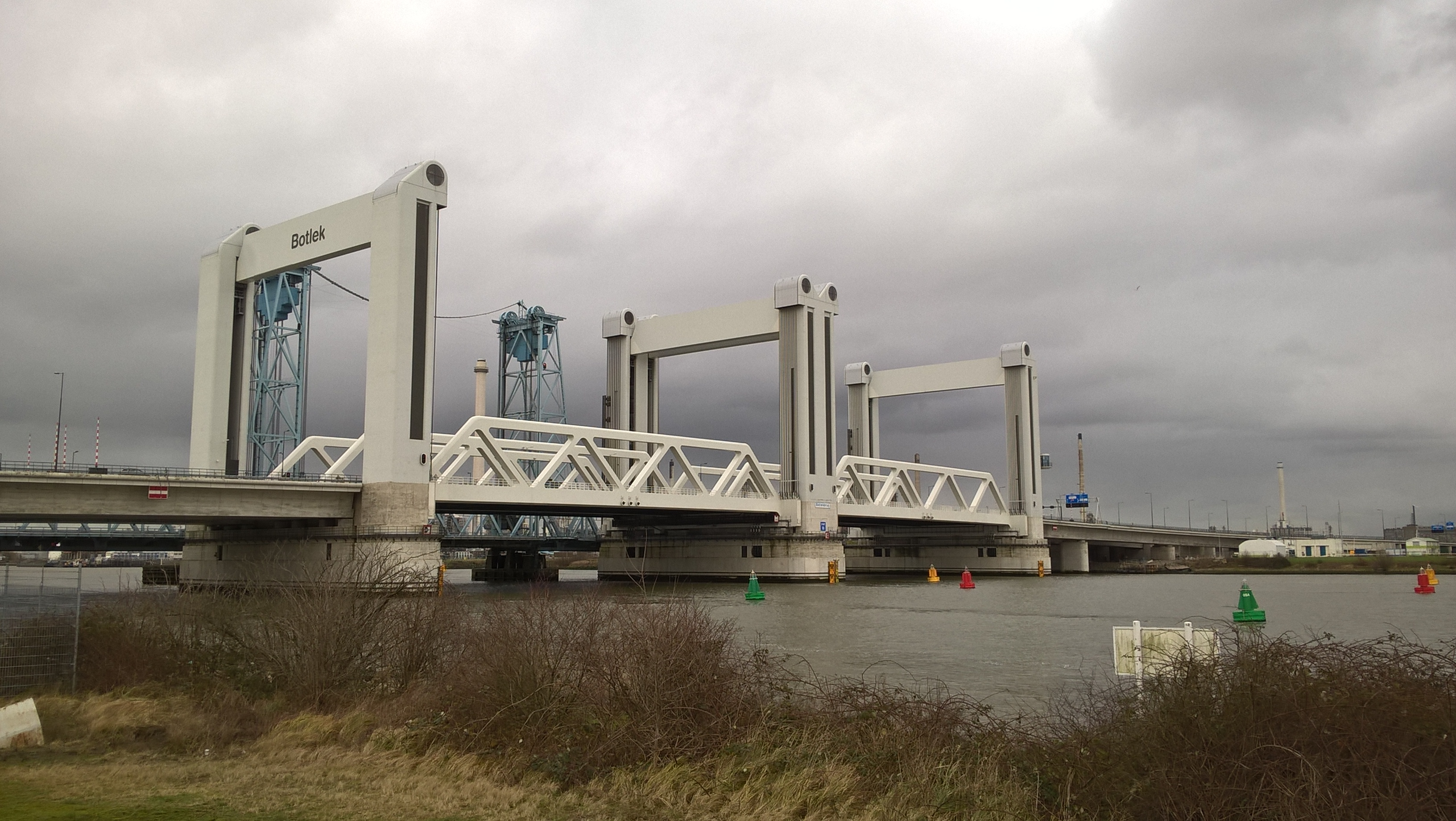
The Botlek bridge in Rotterdam has two lifting spans of 87×50 m (95×55 yd), each with a surface area approaching a football field.

- Botlek Bridge^{NL} – in Rotterdam
- Rotterdam - De Hef (The Lift), designed by Pieter Joosting, opened October 31, 1927
- Gouwe – three identical lift bridges crossing the Gouwe river at Alphen aan den Rijn, Boskoop and Waddinxveen, built in 1930.

== Romania/Bulgaria ==
- Danube Bridge, connecting both countries over Danube, between Giurgiu and Russe. Opened on 20 June 1954, the bridge is 2,223.52 m (7,295.0 ft) long and has a central lift-bridge (85 m) to allow the free-passing oversized boats passage.

== Russia ==
- Finland Railway Bridge, in Saint-Petersburg
- Rostov-on-Don Railway Bridge, in Rostov-on-Don
- The two-storey bridge Reichsbahnbrücke in Kaliningrad

== Sweden ==
- Train bridge in Södertälje, southwest of Stockholm.
- Hisingsbron in Gothenburg, Västra Götaland.

== Ukraine ==
- Bridge over the mouth of Dniester in Zatoka, built in 1953–1955.
- The Kryukov Bridge, over the Dnieper River in Kremenchuk, built in 1949

== United Kingdom ==
- Leamington Lift Bridge – a pedestrian bridge in Edinburgh crossing the Union Canal. Built in 1906.
- Kingsferry Bridge – a road/rail bridge built in Kent in 1960.
- Turnbridge Lift Bridge – highly unusual road bridge at Turnbridge in Huddersfield that crosses the Huddersfield Broad Canal.
- Salford Quays lift bridge – carries pedestrians across the Manchester Ship Canal.
- Tees Newport Bridge – 82m span, first major lift bridge in the UK, built in 1934, still used by road traffic but no longer lifts since 1990.
- Salford Centenary Bridge – road bridge across the Manchester Ship Canal, opened in December 1994.
- Deptford Creek Lifting Bridge – rail bridge, in regular use, but no longer lifts on London and Greenwich Railway.
- Poole Town Bridge - road/pedestrian bridge built in 1927.

== United States ==
=== Alabama ===
- Florence Bridge - a vertical-lift bridge that spanned the Tennessee River between Florence, and Sheffield, Alabama, built in 1840 and closed in 1976
- Naheola Bridge – Built in 1934, a steel lift bridge spanning the Tombigbee River between Choctaw and Marengo counties, notable for rail and automotive traffic sharing the same surface until its closure to automotive traffic in 2001.

=== Arkansas ===
- St. Francis River Bridge (Lake City, Arkansas) – Built in 1934, demolished except for vertical-lift span.
- Yancopin Bridge – A former railroad bridge over the Arkansas River converted to a rail trail. Built in 1903, bridge contains both a lift and a swing span; river channel under lift span now high and dry due to diversion of water through the Arkansas Post Canal.

=== California ===
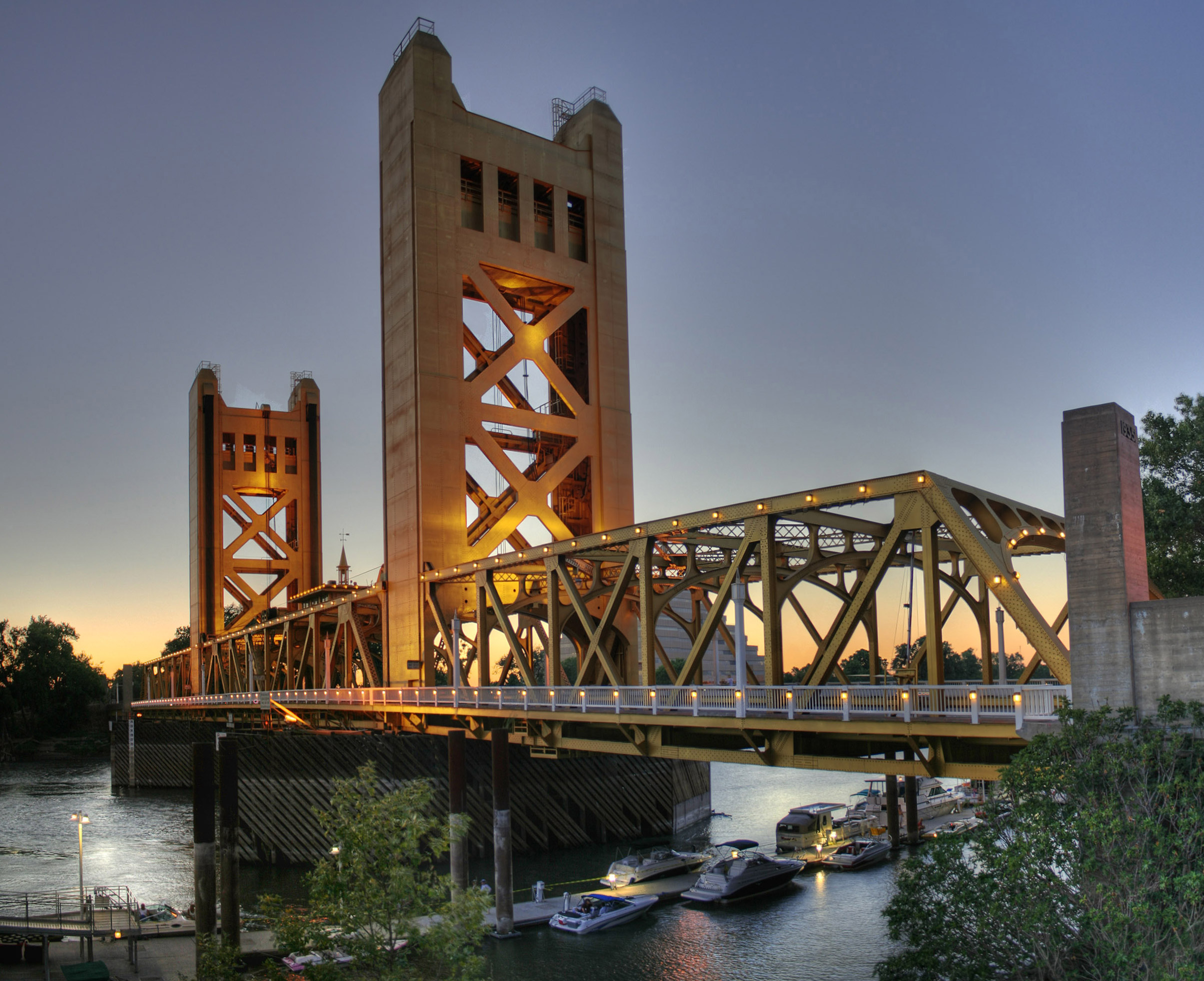
Tower Bridge in Sacramento, California

- Commodore Schuyler F. Heim Bridge – Roadway bridge and directly adjacent Henry Ford Bridge (railroad bridge), at the Port of Los Angeles.
- Fruitvale Bridge – A vertical-lift Warren through truss railroad bridge between Oakland and Alameda, unused since 2000.
- Helen Madere Memorial Bridge, called the "Rio Vista bridge" locally, which carries SR12 across the Sacramento River in Rio Vista.

- Mare Island Causeway Bridge – Built in 1934, carries California State Route 37 over the Napa River in Vallejo.
- Mossdale Railroad Bridge – Originally built swing bridge in 1869 as the first bridge to span the San Joaquin River as well as the final link in the First Transcontinental Railroad, it was rebuilt as a Warren through truss lift bridge in 1942. It is at Lathrop.

- Napa River Railroad Lift Bridge – Vallejo.
- Tower Bridge – A four-lane bridge over the Sacramento River between Sacramento and West Sacramento.

=== Connecticut ===
- Thames River Bridge (Amtrak) – Two-track rail bridge in New London, carrying Amtrak's Northeast Corridor over the Thames River. Built in 1919, a new vertical lift span was erected in place of the original bascule span in 2008.

=== Delaware ===
- Chesapeake & Delaware Canal Lift Bridge – A single-track railroad bridge over the Chesapeake and Delaware Canal that was built in 1966 for the Pennsylvania Railroad and replaced an earlier structure when the U.S. Army Corps of Engineers widened the canal in the mid-1960s. It is the only bridge of its type along the canal, with earlier highway lift or swing bridges being replaced by high-level crossings.

=== Florida ===
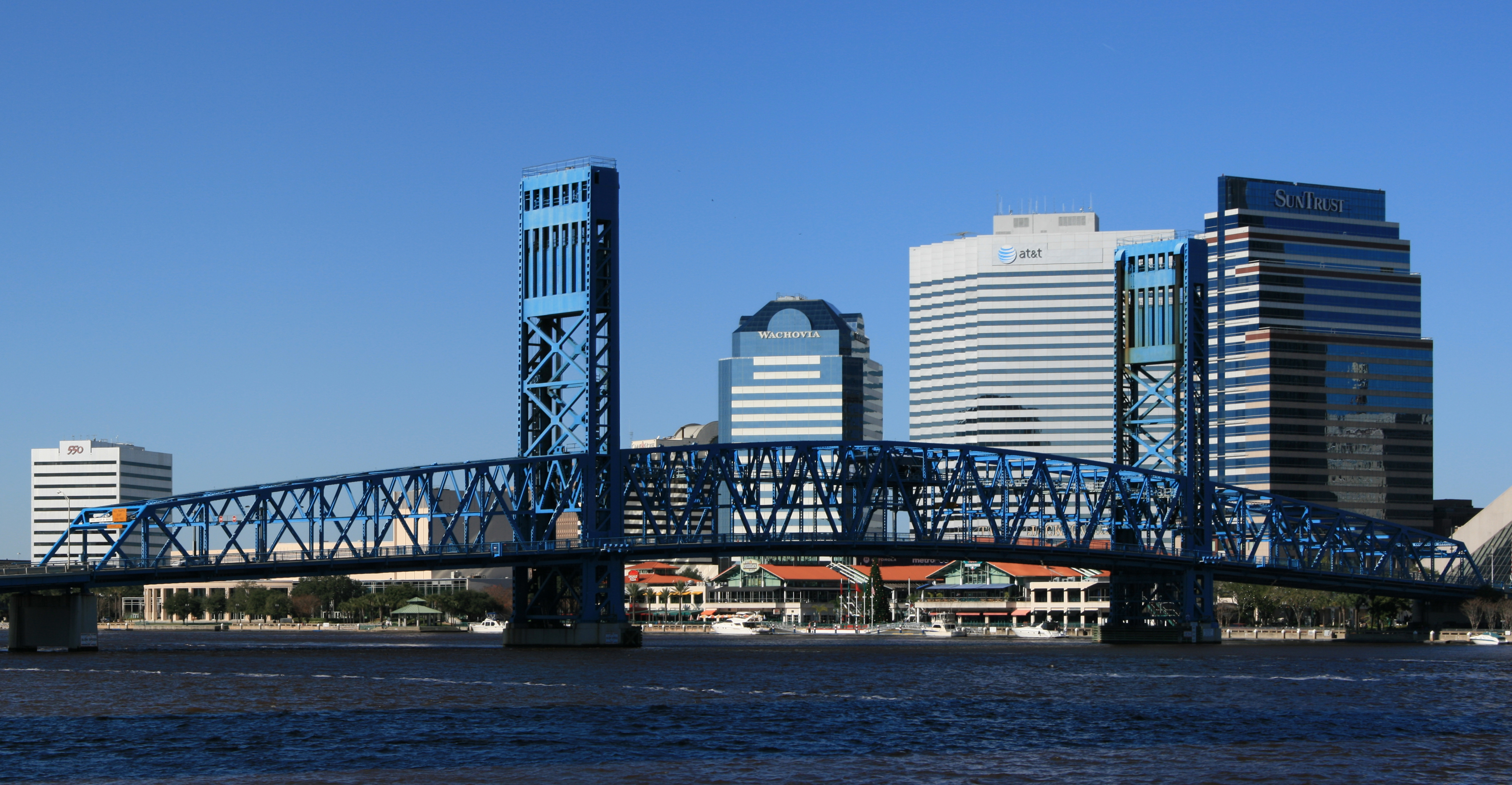
The Main Street Bridge in downtown Jacksonville, Florida.

- Main Street Bridge – A four-lane bridge over the St. Johns River in downtown Jacksonville.

=== Georgia ===
- Sidney Lanier Bridge – Carried US 17 over the Brunswick River in Brunswick, built 1956, replaced 2003.

=== Illinois ===
- Bridge 710 – A single-track railroad bridge over the Calumet River in Chicago that served U.S. Steel's South Works. Formerly owned by EJ&E and now owned by Canadian National since their purchase of EJ&E.
- Canal Street railroad bridge – Over the South Branch of the Chicago River in Chicago, built 1914.
- Florence Bridge – Carries Illinois Route 100 and Illinois Route 106 over the Illinois River just east of Florence.
- Joe Page Bridge – Along the Great River Road and Illinois Route 100, connecting Greene and Calhoun counties over the Illinois River at Hardin, with a lift span of 308 feet 9 inches (94.11 m).
- Lake Shore and Michigan Southern Railway, Bridge No. 6 – Together with the adjacent Pittsburgh, Fort Wayne and Chicago Railway bridge, once carried eight tracks across the Calumet River in Chicago; two tracks of the latter remain in service.
- Ottawa Rail Bridge – Carries Illinois Railway over the Illinois River at Ottawa, built 1898.
- Shippingsport Bridge – Carried Illinois Route 351 over the Illinois River between LaSalle and Oglesby, built 1929, replaced 2003.
- Torrence Avenue and four railroad bridges across the Calumet River shipping channel in Chicago.

=== Kentucky ===
- Fourteenth Street Bridge (Ohio River) – A single-track railroad bridge over the Ohio River at its widest point, Louisville.
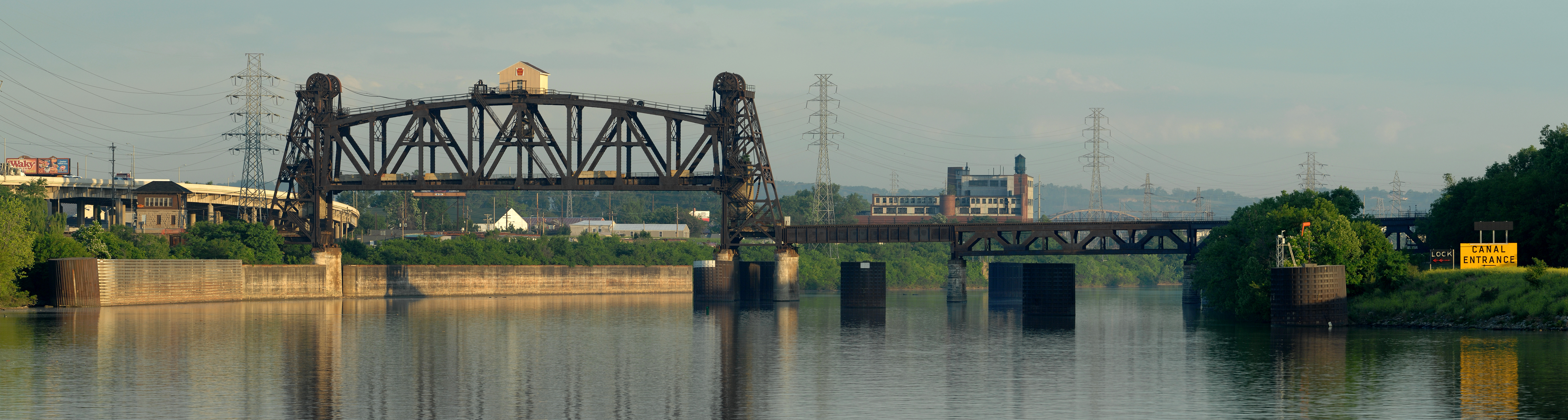
The vertical-lift section of the Fourteenth Street Bridge at the east entrance to the Portland Canal in Louisville, Kentucky.

=== Louisiana ===
- Claiborne Avenue Bridge – A four-lane bridge carrying LA 39 over the Industrial Canal in New Orleans.
- Danziger Bridge – The world's widest vertical-lift movable bridge, at seven lanes, over the Industrial Canal in New Orleans.
- White Kitchen (West Pearl River) Bridge - Built in 1925, carries U.S. Highway 90 traffic over the West Pearl River toward the Louisiana–Mississippi state line.

=== Maine and New Hampshire ===
- Carlton Bridge – Road and single-track rail bridge in Bath, Maine, built in 1927, repaired 1976. Road was bypassed in 2000 with new Route 1 bridge, now only used by the Rockland Branch railroad. Crosses the Kennebec River near Bath Iron Works.
- Sarah Mildred Long Bridge and Memorial Bridge – Two lift bridges (out of 3 bridges) over the Piscataqua River between Kittery, Maine, and Portsmouth, New Hampshire.

=== Massachusetts ===
- Cape Cod Canal Railroad Bridge – A single-track railroad bridge over the Cape Cod Canal in Bourne.
- Chelsea Street Bridge – A four-lane bridge over the Chelsea Creek, opened in 2012, between East Boston and Chelsea.
- Fore River Bridge – Replacement bridge carrying Route 3A over Fore River between Quincy and Weymouth, opened 2015.

=== Michigan ===
- Portage Lake Lift Bridge – A bridge between Hancock and Houghton.
- Sault Ste. Marie International Railroad Bridge – A bridge system with 9 camelback spans, one of which is a lift bridge.

=== Minnesota and Wisconsin ===
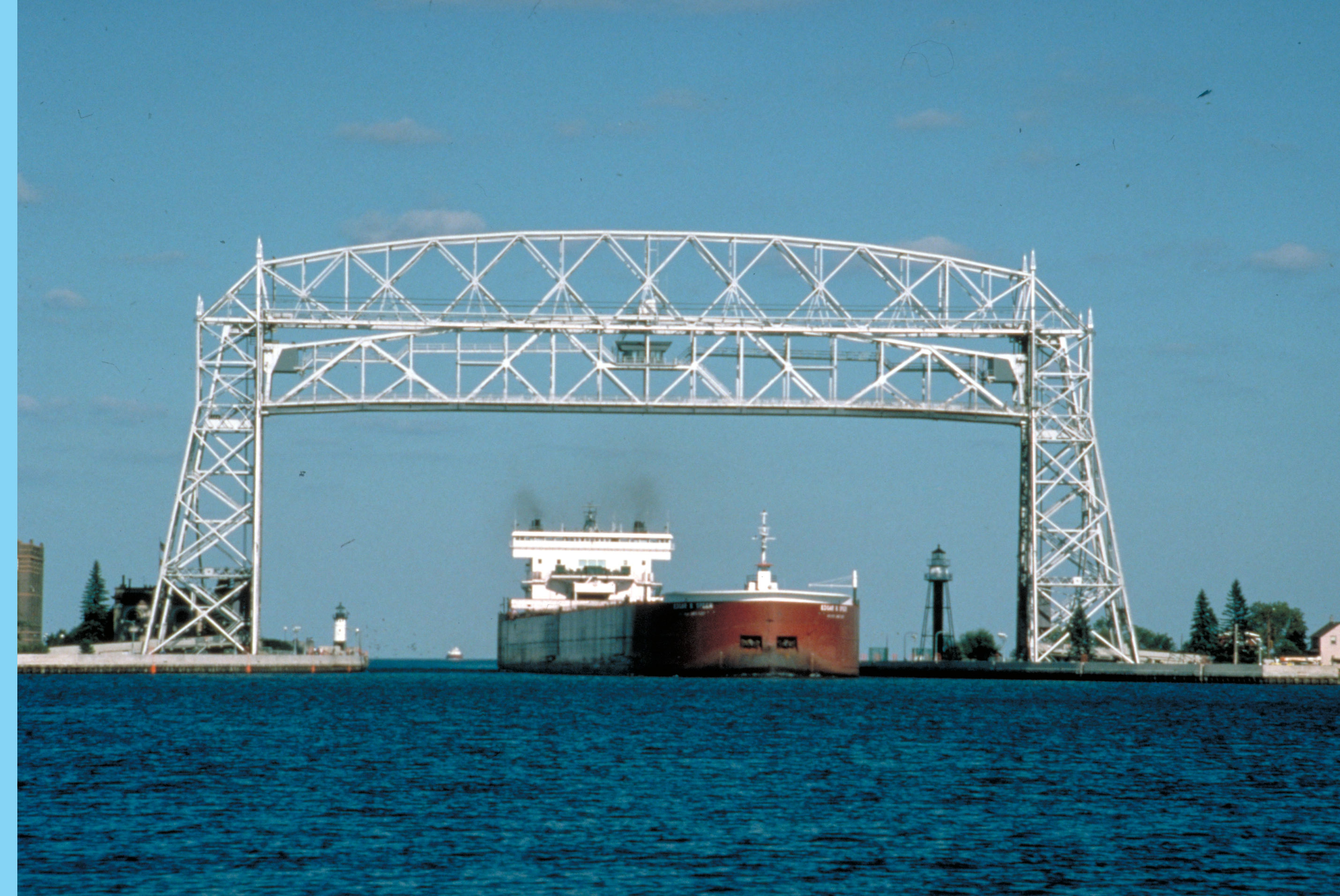
Aerial Lift Bridge in Duluth, Minnesota

- Aerial Lift Bridge – A roadway bridge in Duluth, Minnesota that began life as an aerial transfer or ferry bridge.
- Hastings Rail Bridge – A single-track railroad bridge over the Mississippi River at Hastings, Minnesota.
- Prescott Drawbridge – Carries US 10 over the St. Croix River between Point Douglas, Minnesota, and Prescott, Wisconsin.
- St. Paul Union Pacific Vertical-lift Rail Bridge – A single-track railroad bridge over the Mississippi River in downtown St. Paul, Minnesota.
- Stillwater Lift Bridge – A highway bridge over the St. Croix River between Stillwater, Minnesota, and Houlton, Wisconsin.

=== Missouri ===
- ASB Bridge – A two-deck bridge over the Missouri River in Kansas City. From 1911 to 1987, handled both trains and cars, on separate decks, and still carries railroad traffic.
- Harry S. Truman Bridge – Opened in 1945, a single-track railroad bridge over the Missouri River, in Kansas City.

=== Montana ===
- Snowden Bridge – Carries BNSF Railway over Missouri River, built 1913; also carried a roadway until 1985.

=== New York City and northern New Jersey ===
- Arthur Kill Vertical Lift Bridge – Connecting Elizabeth, New Jersey, and Staten Island, New York, with a 559-foot (170 m) span, the longest lift span in the world.
- Broadway Bridge – A bridge spanning the Harlem River and carrying both road traffic and trains of the New York City Subway's No. 1 line.
- CRRNJ Newark Bay Bridge – Carried Central Railroad of New Jersey over Newark Bay between Elizabeth and Bayonne, New Jersey; demolished by 1988.
- Dock Bridge – A six-track rail bridge in New Jersey carrying Amtrak, New Jersey Transit, and PATH trains over the Passaic River, consisting of three parallel vertical lift spans carrying one, two, and three tracks respectively from south to north, with both tracks of the two-track span at a higher level than all the others.
- Lehigh Valley Railroad Bridge – Over Newark Bay, used by freight rail within Conrail's North Jersey Shared Assets Area.
- Lower Hack Lift – Carries NJ Transit Morristown Line tracks over Hackensack River between Kearny and Jersey City, New Jersey, built in 1927.
- Marine Parkway–Gil Hodges Memorial Bridge – Carries Flatbush Avenue over Rockaway Inlet between Brooklyn and Queens; designed in 1937 by David Steinman.
- Park Avenue Bridge – New York City bridge with twin 340-foot (100 m) spans, which replaced a swing bridge in 1956, carrying all Metro-North lines operating out of Grand Central Terminal.
- PATH Lift Bridge – Carries Port Authority Trans-Hudson (PATH) tracks over Hackensack River between Kearny and Jersey City, New Jersey, built in 1900.
- William A. Stickel Memorial Bridge – A six-lane bridge that crosses the Passaic River between Newark and Harrison, New Jersey.
- Triborough Bridge Manhattan Span – A six-lane bridge between the New York City boroughs of Queens and Manhattan, built in 1934.

=== New York (upstate) ===
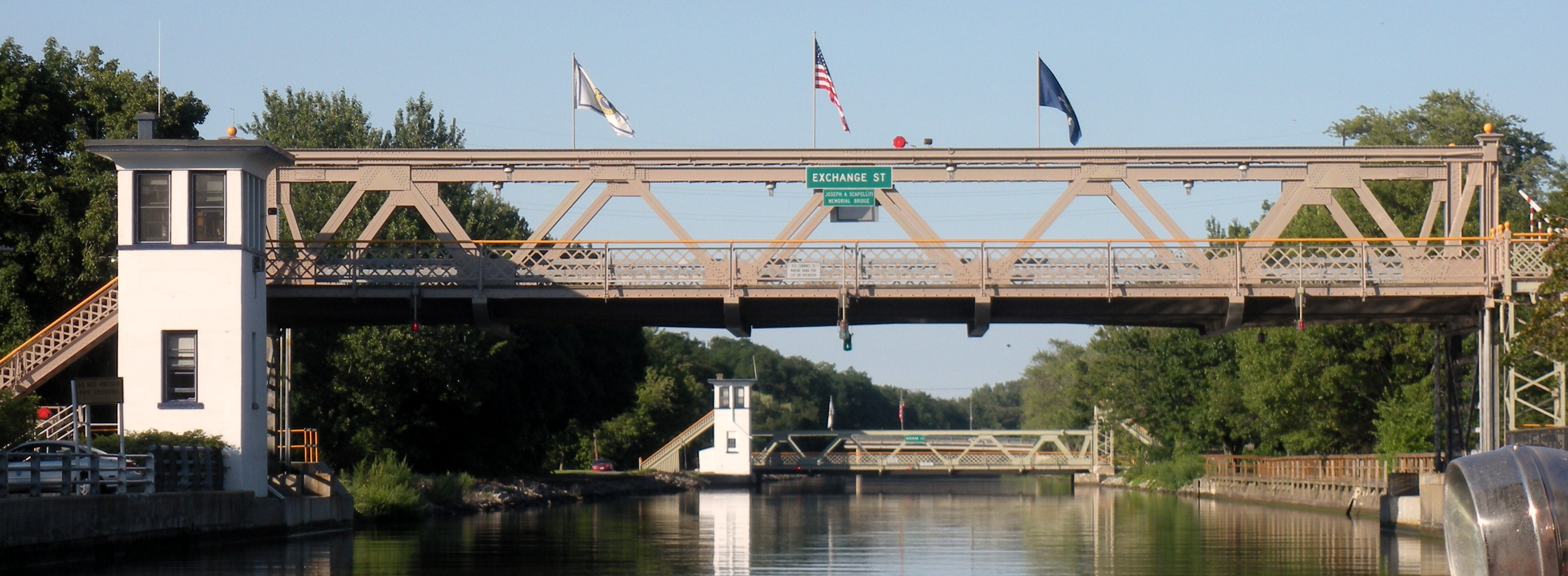
Two Erie Canal lift bridges in Lockport, New York, the nearest one shown raised for canal traffic (and closed to road traffic). The pedestrian stairs allow foot traffic to cross the raised span. Initially these bridges normally remained open for canal traffic and closed on demand for the sparse road traffic of the early 20th century. In 2011, the Adam Street Lift Bridge (in the background) was closed and left in the raised position. This image was taken in July 2010.

- Adam Street Lift Bridge – A two-lane vehicle and pedestrian bridge spanning the Erie Canal in Lockport. Built in 1917, it has a span of 130 feet (40 m). It was closed in 2011 and left in the raised position.
- Adams Basin Lift Bridge, also called the Washington Street Lift Bridge – A two-lane vehicle and pedestrian bridge spanning the Erie Canal in Adams Basin, near Spencerport, built in 1912, with a span of 145 feet (44 m).
- Eagle Harbor Lift Bridge – A two-lane vehicle and pedestrian bridge spanning the Erie Canal near Albion, built in 1910, with a span of 145 feet (44 m).
- Exchange Street Lift Bridge – A two-lane vehicle and pedestrian bridge spanning the Erie Canal in Lockport, built in 1915, with a span of 133 feet (41 m).
- Fairport Lift Bridge, also called the Main Street Lift Bridge – A two-lane vehicle and pedestrian bridge spanning the Erie Canal in Fairport, built in 1914, and notable due to its irregular, ten-sided structure, as well as the 32-degree angle at which it crosses the canal. The bridge has a span of 139 feet (42 m).
- Gasport Lift Bridge, also called the Hartland Road Lift Bridge – A two-lane vehicle and pedestrian bridge spanning the Erie Canal in Gasport, built in 1913, with a span of 139 feet (42 m).
- Green Island Bridge – Opened in 1981, with a simply supported plate girder bridge span supported by a cross member.
- Holley Lift Bridge, also called the East Avenue Lift Bridge – A two-lane vehicle and pedestrian bridge spanning the Erie Canal in Holley, built in 1911, with a span of 141 feet (43 m).
- Hulberton Road Lift Bridge – A two-lane vehicle and pedestrian bridge spanning the Erie Canal in Hulberton, built in 1913, with a span of 145 feet (44 m).
- Ingersoll Street Lift Bridge – A two-lane vehicle and pedestrian bridge spanning the Erie Canal in Albion, built in 1911, with a span of 135 feet (41 m).
- Knowlesville Lift Bridge – A two-lane vehicle and pedestrian bridge spanning the Erie Canal in Ridgeway, near Medina, built in 1910, with a span of 145 feet (44 m).
- Main Street Lift Bridge (Albion, New York) – A two-lane vehicle and pedestrian bridge spanning the Erie Canal in Albion, built in 1914, with a span of 138 feet (42 m).
- Main Street Lift Bridge (Brockport, New York) – A two-lane vehicle and pedestrian bridge spanning the Erie Canal in Brockport, built in 1915, with a span of 156 feet (48 m).
- Medina Lift Bridge, also called the Prospect Avenue Lift Bridge – A two-lane vehicle and pedestrian bridge spanning the Erie Canal in Medina, built in 1914, with a span of 130 feet (40 m).
- Middleport Lift Bridge, also called the Main Street Lift Bridge – A two-lane vehicle and pedestrian bridge spanning the Erie Canal in Middleport, built in 1915, with a span of 142 feet (43 m).
- Park Avenue Lift Bridge – A two-lane vehicle and pedestrian bridge spanning the Erie Canal in Brockport, built in 1914, with a span of 156 feet (48 m).
- Spencerport Lift Bridge, also called the Union Street Lift Bridge – A two-lane vehicle and pedestrian bridge spanning the Erie Canal in Spencerport, built in 1913, with a span of 141 feet (43 m).

=== North Carolina ===
- Cape Fear Memorial Bridge – A four-lane bridge over the Cape Fear River between Wilmington and Brunswick County.

=== Ohio ===
- Columbus Road Bridge – Over the Cuyahoga River in Cleveland, built in 1940
- Cuyahoga River Bridge 1 – A single-track railroad bridge over the mouth of the Cuyahoga River in Cleveland, one of nine railroad and automobile lift bridges, and three bascule bridges, allowing ore boats to service the Flats.

=== Oregon and Washington (state) ===
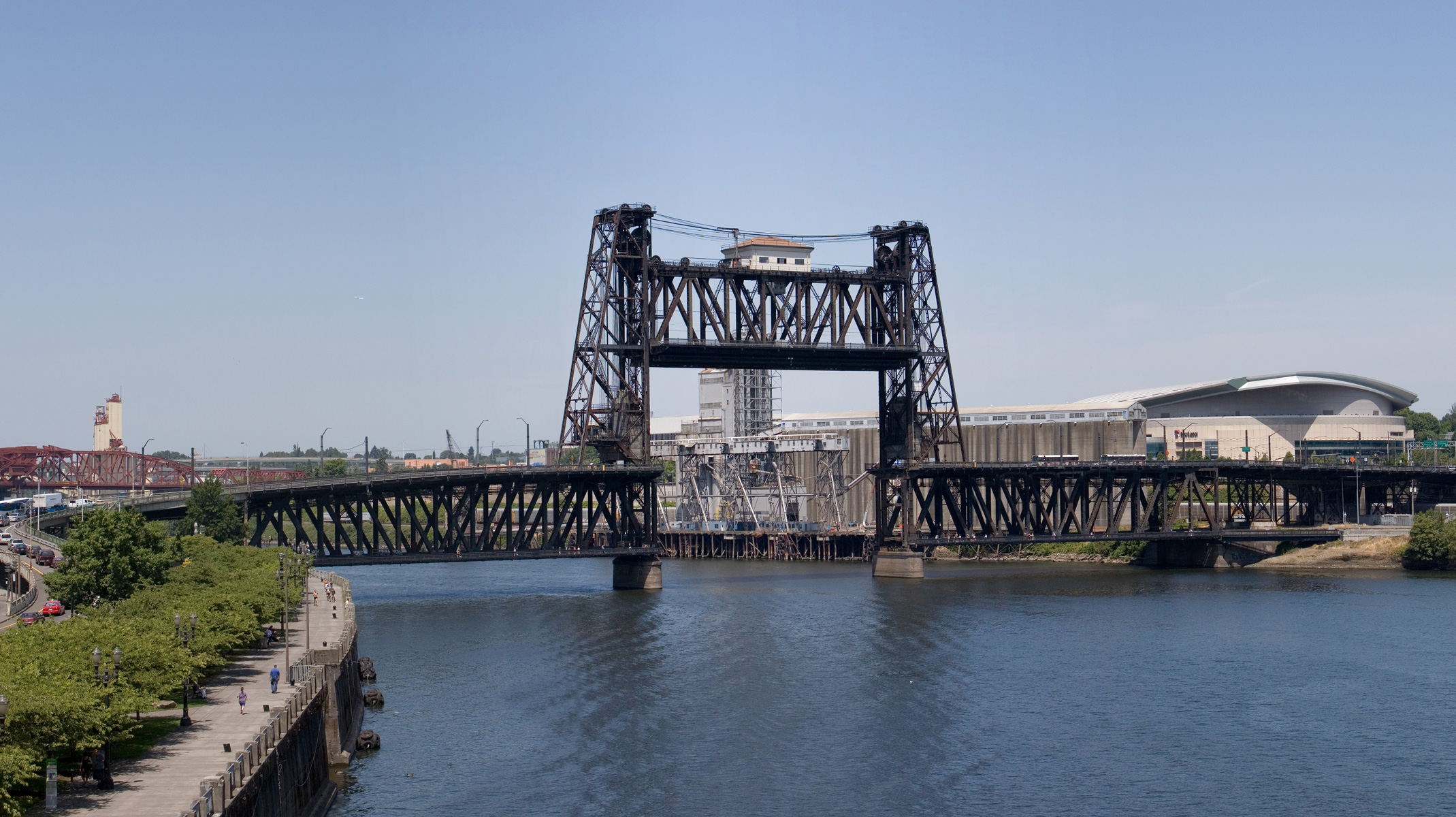
Steel Bridge in Portland, Oregon

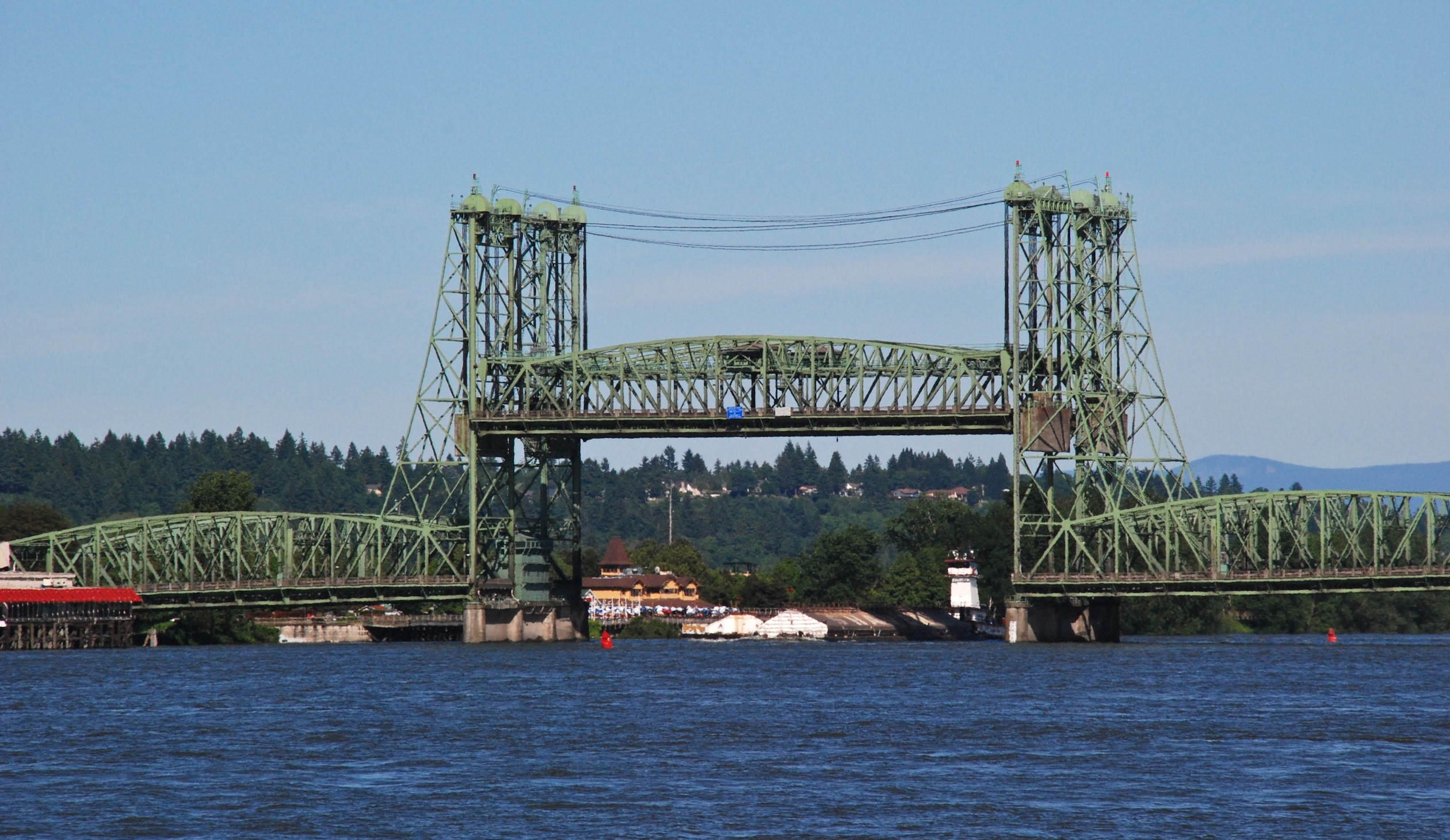
The Interstate Bridge, on Interstate 5 between Oregon and Washington, is one of only very few opening bridges on the national Interstate Highway System.

- The BNSF Railroad Bridge across the Willamette River, in Portland, Oregon. The 516-foot (157 m) lift span replaced a swing span in 1989 and, with 200 ft (61 m) of clearance underneath when raised, it is one of the highest vertical-lift bridges in the world.
- Hawthorne Bridge – A four-lane bridge over the Willamette River in Portland, Oregon, opened in 1910, and the oldest operating vertical-lift bridge in the United States.
- Hood River Bridge – Over the Columbia River, between Hood River, Oregon, and White Salmon, Washington.
- Interstate Bridge – Carries Interstate 5 over the Columbia River between Portland, Oregon, and Vancouver, Washington, with towers 190 feet (58 m) tall above the roadway.
- Oregon Trunk Rail Bridge – Built in 1912, crossing the Columbia River and still in use by BNSF freight trains.
- Steel Bridge – A double-lift bridge over the Willamette River in Portland, Oregon. Its lower deck carries railroad tracks and a bike lane and can be lifted independently of the upper deck with a road and light rail tracks. It is the only double-deck bridge with independent lifts in the world.
- Murray Morgan Bridge – Steel lift bridge in Tacoma, Washington, notable for its height above water, sloping span, and overhead span to carry a water pipe; closed October 23, 2007. It has since reopened and is raised on an as-needed basis.

=== Pennsylvania and southern New Jersey ===
- Burlington–Bristol Bridge – A two-lane bridge over the Delaware River between Burlington, New Jersey, and Bristol, Pennsylvania, near Philadelphia.
- Delair Bridge – A two-track rail bridge carrying New Jersey Transit Atlantic City Line passenger trains and Conrail freight trains over the Delaware River; built 1896, lift span inserted in 1960 over a relocated and widened shipping channel to replace the original swing span, which was immobilized.
- Lovelandtown Bridge – a four-lane bridge spanning the Intracoastal Waterway in Point Pleasant, New Jersey, built between 1970 and 1972.
- Philadelphia Naval Shipyard – A bridge that connects 26th Street with the west end of the shipyard over a waterway between the Schuylkill River and Reserve Basin.

=== Texas ===
- Rio Hondo Bridge – Built in 1953, Texas's only lift bridge built between 1945 and 1960 still operating. Considered a prime gateway of the Rio Grande Valley, the bridge remains critical to the region's economy. Every year, its spans open about 250 times to make room for barges hauling fuel, fertilizer, sand and cement to the Port of Harlingen.

=== Virginia ===
- James River Bridge – A four-lane vehicle bridge crossing the James River between Isle of Wight County and Newport News, originally built in 1928, before being replaced between 1975 and 1982, with a span of 415 feet (126 m).

=== Wisconsin ===
- Veterans Memorial Bridge (Kaukauna, Wisconsin) - A steel bridge built in 1984 crossing the Fox River in Kaukauna, Wisconsin. A restoration was completed in 2022.
