= Knowlesville Lift Bridge =

- Coordinates: 43°14′34″N 78°18′38″W
- Crosses: Erie Canal
- Locale: Knowlesville Road, Ridgeway, Orleans County, New York

History
- Constructed by: Thomas Crimmins Contracting Company; New York, New York
- Built: 1910

The Knowlesville Lift Bridge is a Warren truss vertical-lift bridge on the New York State Canal System.

== Structure and location ==
The Knowlesville Lift Bridge is located on Knowlesville Road in Ridgeway, New York, and is a part of the New York State Canal System (formerly known as the New York State Barge Canal). The vertical-lift bridge is a Warren truss with a length of 145 feet (44 m) sitting on concrete abutments, and has an open grate deck. The east side of the bridge has a truss erected in 1964 used to carry a gas pipeline across the Erie Canal. It has a normal water surface elevation of 514 feet (157 m), and a normal overhead clearance of 16.57 feet (5.05 m). According to the New York State Department of Transportation, 1,100 vehicles use the bridge daily.

== History ==
The contract for building the bridge was awarded to the Thomas Crimmins Contracting Company of New York, and machinery operating the bridge was installed in 1910. The bridge was rehabilitated, and a new control building was built, in 1975. In 1985, the bridge's electrical systems were rehabilitated. The bridge was closed for steel repairs in November 2017 and reopened the following year in June 2018.

== See also ==
- List of bridges documented by the Historic American Engineering Record in New York
- List of Vertical-lift bridges
- Vertical-lift bridge
- Warren truss
