= I Street Bridge =

Bridge in Sacramento, California

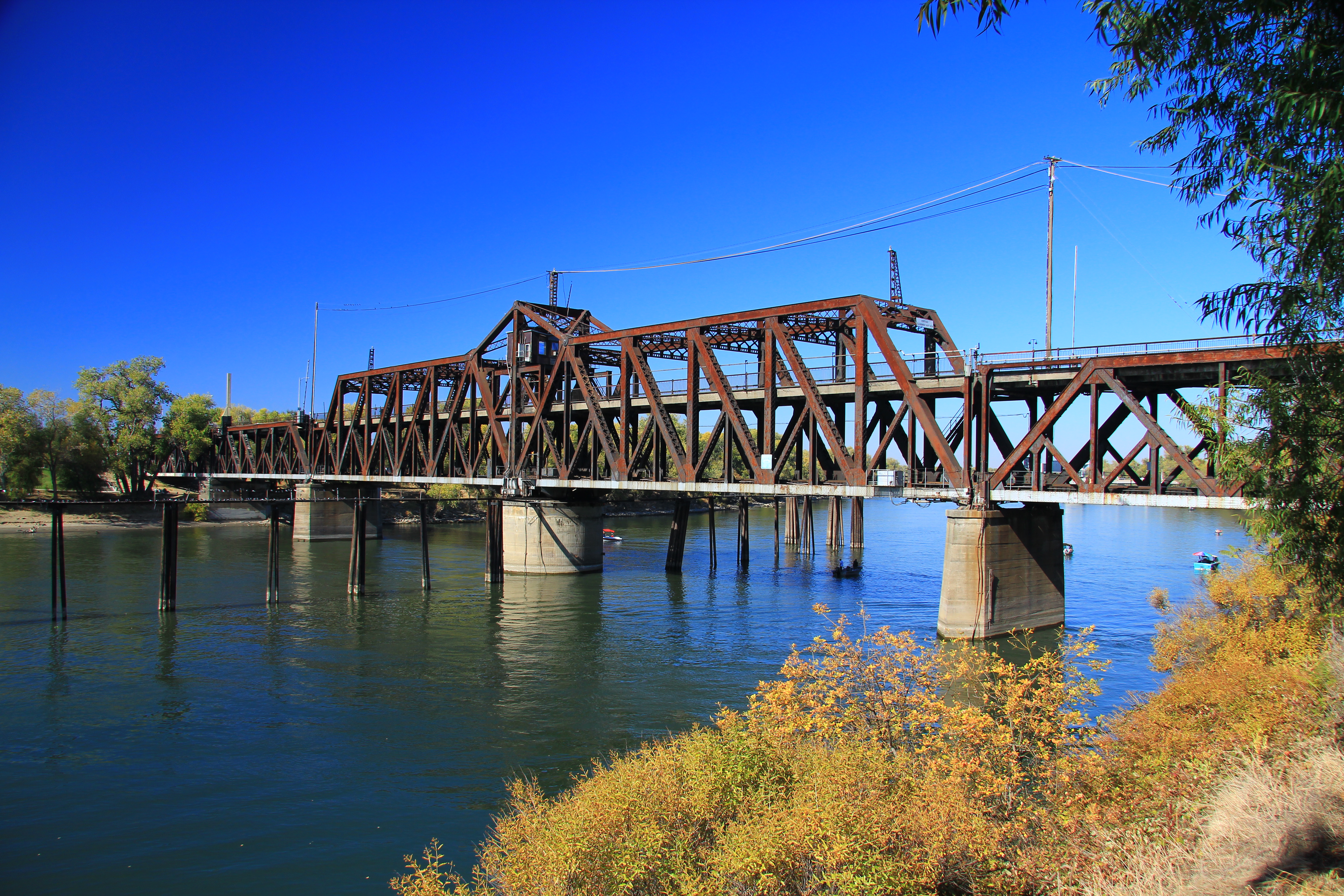
- Coordinates: 38°35′10″N 121°30′23″W
- Carries: State Route 16; Union Pacific Railroad Martinez Subdivision
- Crosses: Sacramento River
- Locale: Sacramento, California
- Official name: I Street Bridge
- Named for: I Street (Sacramento)
- Maintained by: Union Pacific Railroad

Characteristics
- Design: double-deck through truss swing bridge
- Total length: 400 ft (120 m)

History
- Constructed by: American Bridge Company
- I Street Bridge
- U.S. National Register of Historic Places
- Location within California Location within the United States
- Location: Sacramento, California
- Coordinates: 38°35′11″N 121°30′25″W
- Area: less than one acre
- Built: 1912
- Architectural style: Double-Deck Steel Truss
- NRHP reference No.: 82002233
- Added to NRHP: April 22, 1982

Location
- Interactive map of I Street Bridge

The I Street Bridge is a historic metal truss double-deck swing bridge that crosses the Sacramento River to link the capital city of Sacramento, California, with Yolo County to the west.

== History ==
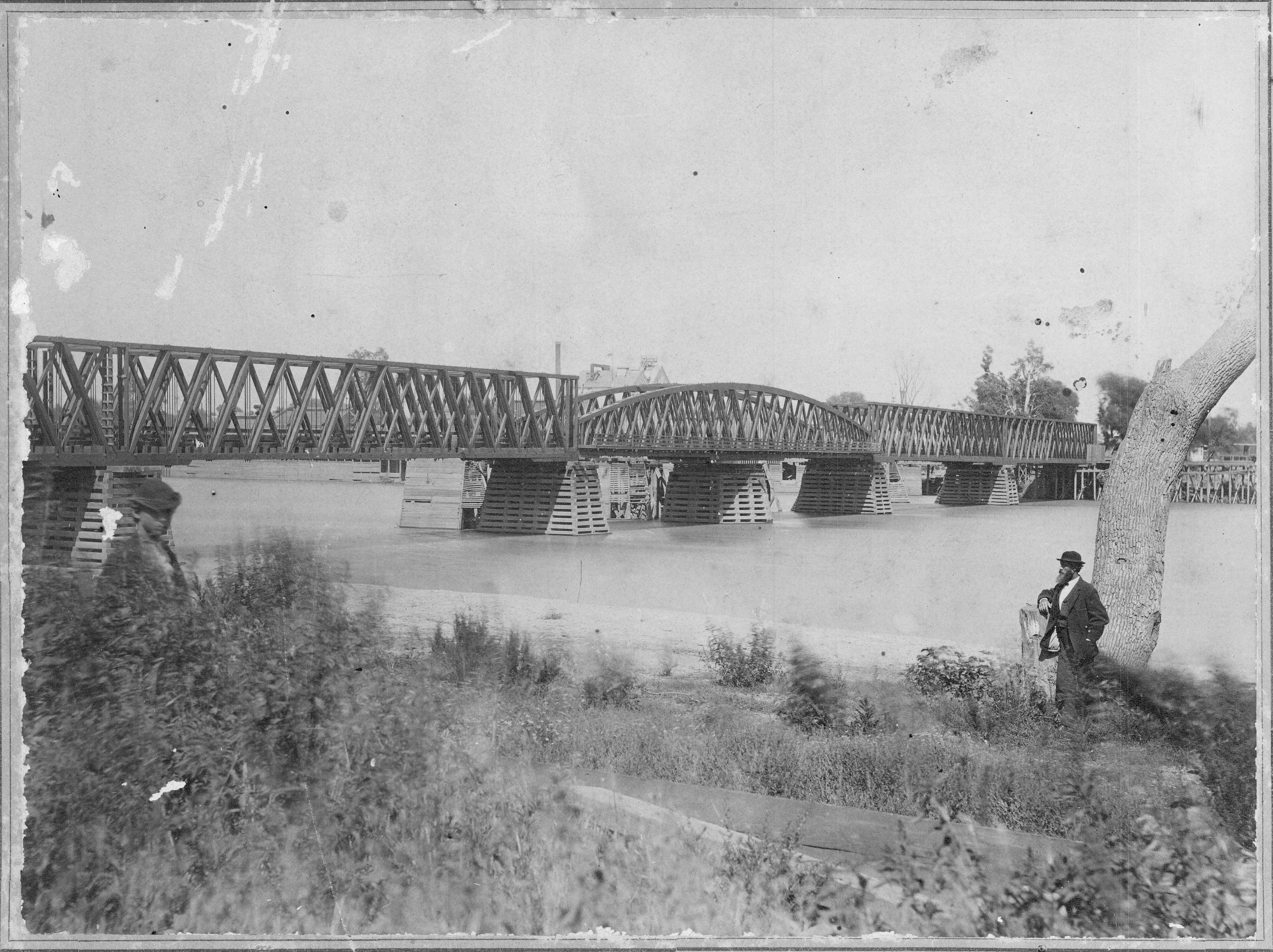
California Pacific Railroad bridge, first Sacramento River crossing (1870-1878). Swing span: Bowstring truss; Fixed spans: Howe truss

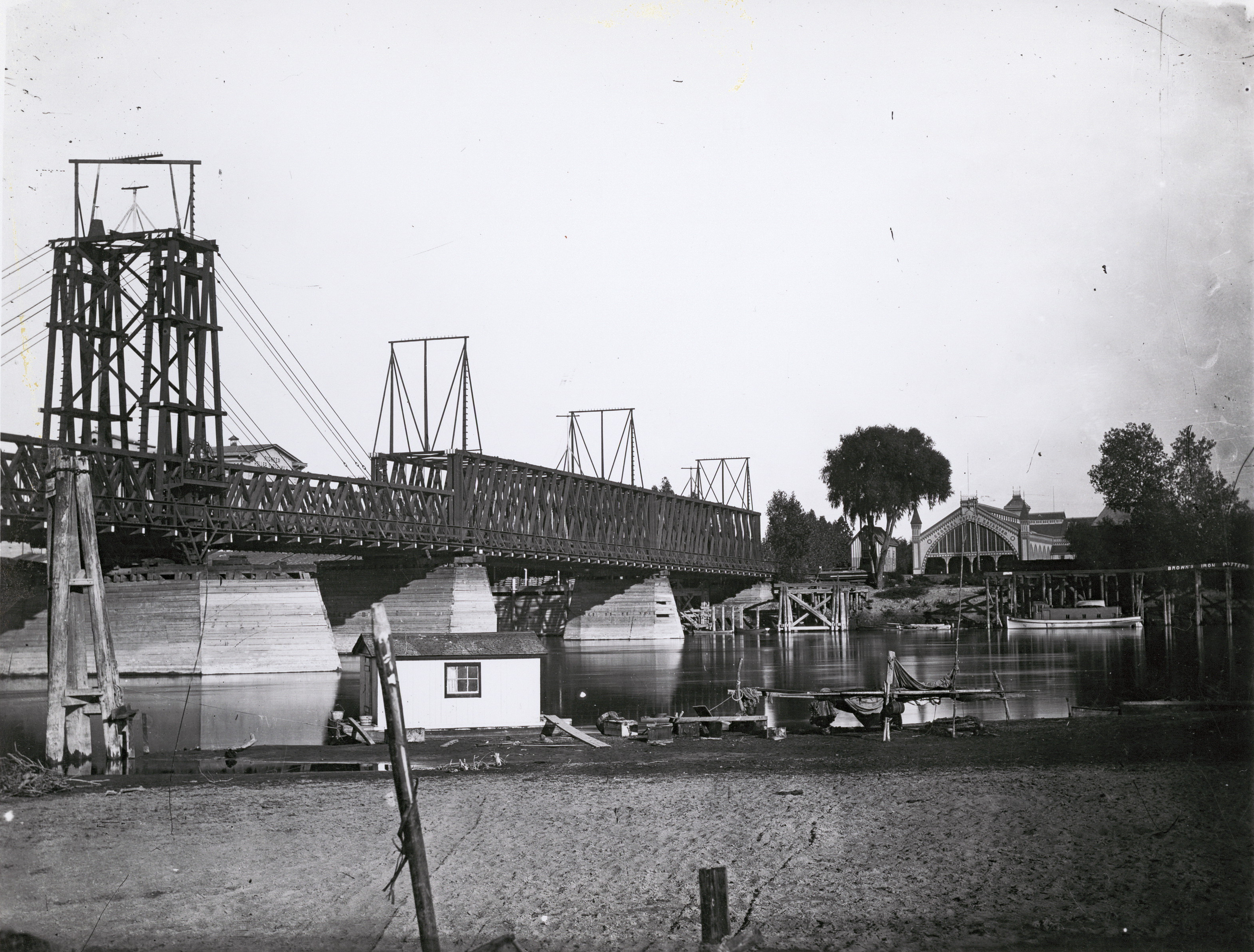
Central Pacific Railroad bridge, Sacramento (1878-1895). Swing span: trestle-tower cable-stayed Howe truss. View from the Yolo County side, looking east, towards west side of the Central Pacific Railroad passenger station (completed 1879).

The California Pacific Railroad Company built the first railroad bridge across the Sacramento River at Sacramento. The first train crossed from Yolo County to Sacramento on January 29, 1870.

After purchasing the California Pacific Railroad in 1876, the Central Pacific Railroad built a wooden Howe truss swing bridge in 1878, just upstream from the California Pacific bridge. Its swing span featured a trestle tower with stabilizing cables, a design feature used previously in the 1869 Mossdale bridge. It carried both wagon traffic and rail traffic on its single deck and single track, with flagmen at both ends to ensure safety.

In 1895, a third wooden railroad bridge was completed, the culmination of a joint project of the Southern Pacific Railroad and the governments of Sacramento County and Yolo County that began in 1893. It was the first double-deck Howe truss bridge, with wagon traffic on top and rail traffic on the bottom. The swing span featured a trestle tower with stabilizing cables down to the lower deck. But the initial understanding of the counties was that the bridge would be built in steel, which led to much controversy and litigations that were finally settled by the Supreme Court.

On February 14, 1910 the Southern Pacific Railroad, and the governments of Sacramento County and Yolo County again agreed to construction of a new bridge across the Sacramento River.

Interest in the bridge was taken immediately by consultants, engineering groups, and concerned citizens, with many proposing designs and proposing locations regarding where exactly the bridge should be located. An example of this is reported in the Sacramento Daily Union, where an engineer from a firm in Kansas City, named Waddell and Harrington proposed a lift bridge instead of a swing bridge. This idea gained some popularity, with the Yolo County Board of Supervisors even voting in favor of the plans presented by engineering firm. The Board of Supervisors for Yolo County had delayed giving its full support for the bridge because of the lack of support given to the Northern Electric Railroad, in their efforts to construct what would eventually become the M Street Bridge. This was despite signing an agreement for the bridge's construction. Due to this lack of support, Southern Pacific threatened to build only the railroad portion of the bridge, and not the upper deck which would support wagons and eventually automobiles. Yolo County would finally support the construction of the upper deck on September 8, 1910, months after Southern Pacific started construction on the bridge.

Despite the initial lack of clarity on the part of the Yolo County government, Southern Pacific decided to go ahead on construction of the bridge. Southern Pacific attorney W.H. Delvin would eventually make a public statement about the situation, stating

“Gentlemen: —Referring to the contract between the Southern Pacific Railroad company, a corporation, as party of the first part, and the county of Sacramento as party of the second part, and the county of Yolo as the party of the third part, the same being dated February 14. 1910. and concerning proposed new bridge to be erected by the said Southern Pacific Railroad company across the Sacramento river between the town of Washington, in the county of Yolo, and the city of Sacramento, in the county of Sacramento; “I am directed by the Southern Pacific company, the party of the first part in said contract, to advise you that it will be impracticable to change the swing draw, as provided In said contract, to the vertical lift type. and that, hence, no further negotiation, or conferences in that behalf will be necessary. Very truly yours, “W. H. DELVIN, “Attorney' for Southern Pacific Railroad Company.”

Scrapbook containing photographs of I Street Bridge Construction, digitized by California Revealed from the collections of the California State Railroad Museum
- https://californiarevealed.org/do/d7206139-caeb-45de-ad0b-542588b7b6dc

On June 8, 1910 construction would officially begin, as carloads of equipment were unloaded and crews began work on the bridge. Workers encountered trouble early on, as during the construction process, workers encountered buried cans of rotting salmon, likely from an old cannery. The overwhelming stench disturbed residents of Broderick, California, and caused the construction crew to work with clothespins on their nose. In addition to the salmon, workers would eventually uncover old rails from a California Pacific Railroad bridge, human and animal bones, and some gold flakes, which caused some gold seekers to sit near the construction site, and watch for any in the flowing river.

The I Street Bridge, known at the time as simply the Southern Pacific Bridge was finally completed on April 29, 1912. The bridge cost $1 million (equivalent to $33.4 million in 2025 adjusted for inflation) to construct. A small celebration was held to commemorate the completion of the bridge by hoisting the American Flag over the center of the bridge. The first train to cross this bridge was No. 19 passenger train from San Francisco, with other passenger trains crossing afterward.

== Operations ==
The lower level of the bridge provides rail access to and from Sacramento. The upper level provides highway access. The bridge supports various Amtrak routes, such as the Capitol Corridor, Coast Starlight, and California Zephyr. The bridge is very close to the Sacramento Valley Station and connects to the Davis station to the west. This historic bridge has a vertical clearance of 14 feet 8 inches (4.47 m) and was originally part of State Route 16. It also carries two walkways; one on either side of the roadway.

== I Street Bridge Replacement Project ==
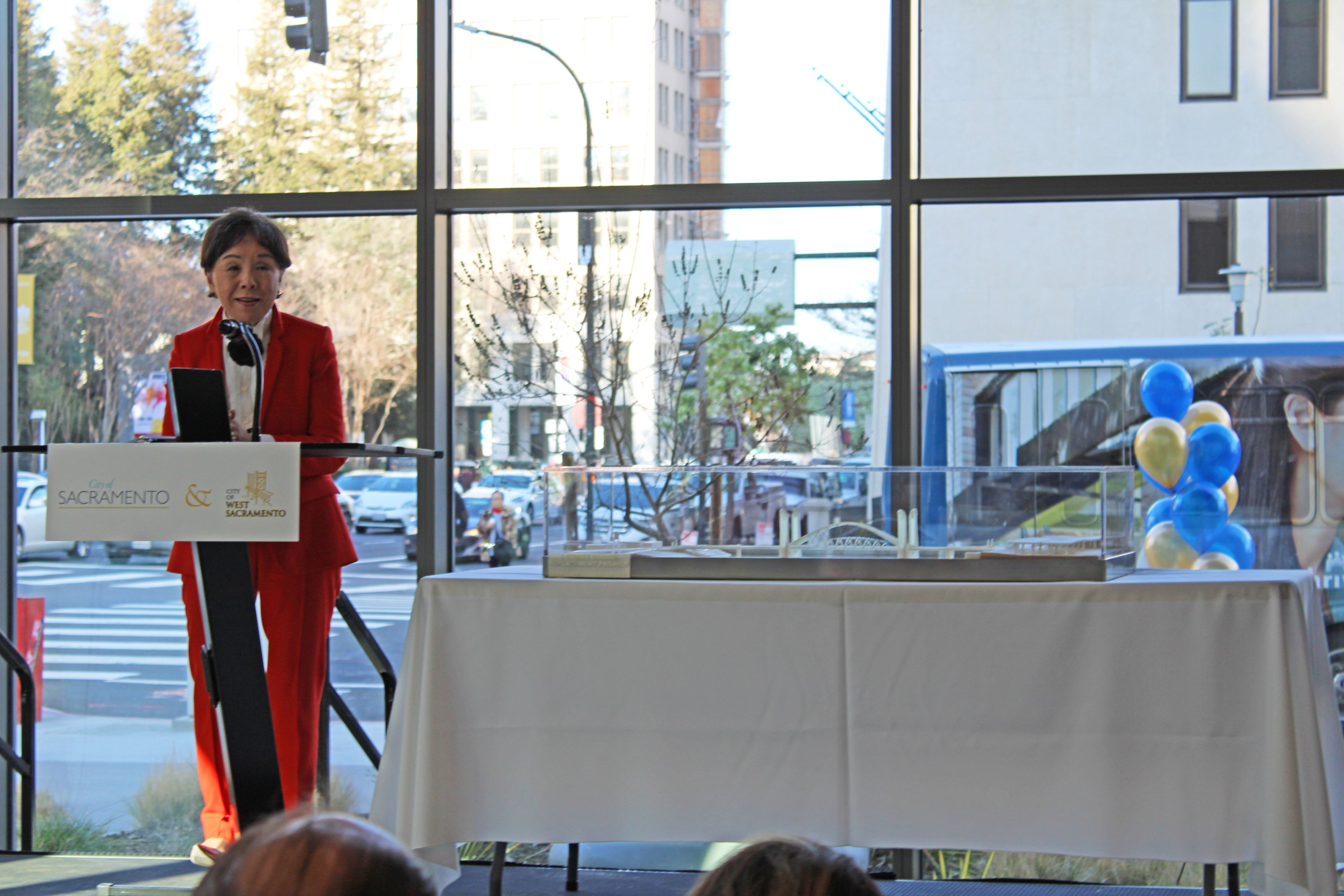
Doris Matsui presents I Street Bridge design, Sacramento, California (February 21, 2020) 02

In February 2011, the cities of Sacramento and West Sacramento released the Sacramento River Crossings Alternatives Study This study determined that the I Street Bridge's "upper roadway is too narrow to serve buses, it has no bicycle facilities, and it has very narrow sidewalks". Thus, one of the recommendations of the study was the replacement of the I Street Bridge. These two city governments eventually determined that this new bridge's construction was feasible and went ahead with the project. The two city governments received a 76 million dollar grant in 2016, and in 2018 they opened a Bridge Architect Design Competition, to allow architects time to propose potential bridge designs. This competition resulted in 9 preliminary designs, which were eventually narrowed down to 4. These four designs were shown in community meetings, and received public input. On February 21, 2020 the final design of the bridge was released showing a vertical-lift bridge that is 860 feet long, with a 330 foot lift span. The bridge included public seating, bike lanes, and larger sidewalks. The bridge would connect Sacramento's Railyards District to West Sacramento's planned Washington Neighborhood.

As of February 2024, the bridge is slated to start construction in 2025, but that date is not guaranteed due to a lack of proper funding.

== Gallery ==
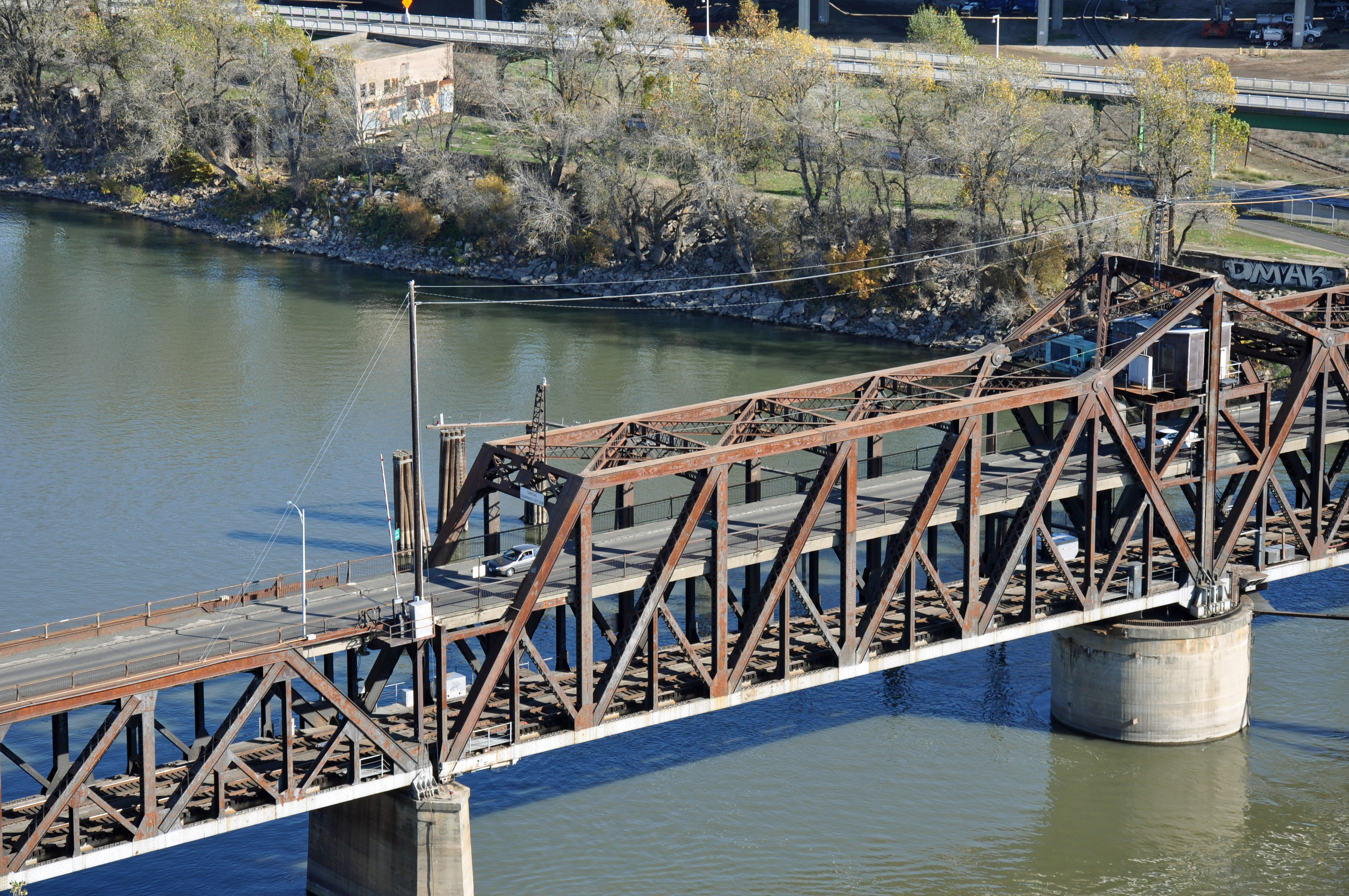
View from above, showing roadway on top deck and train tracks on lower deck

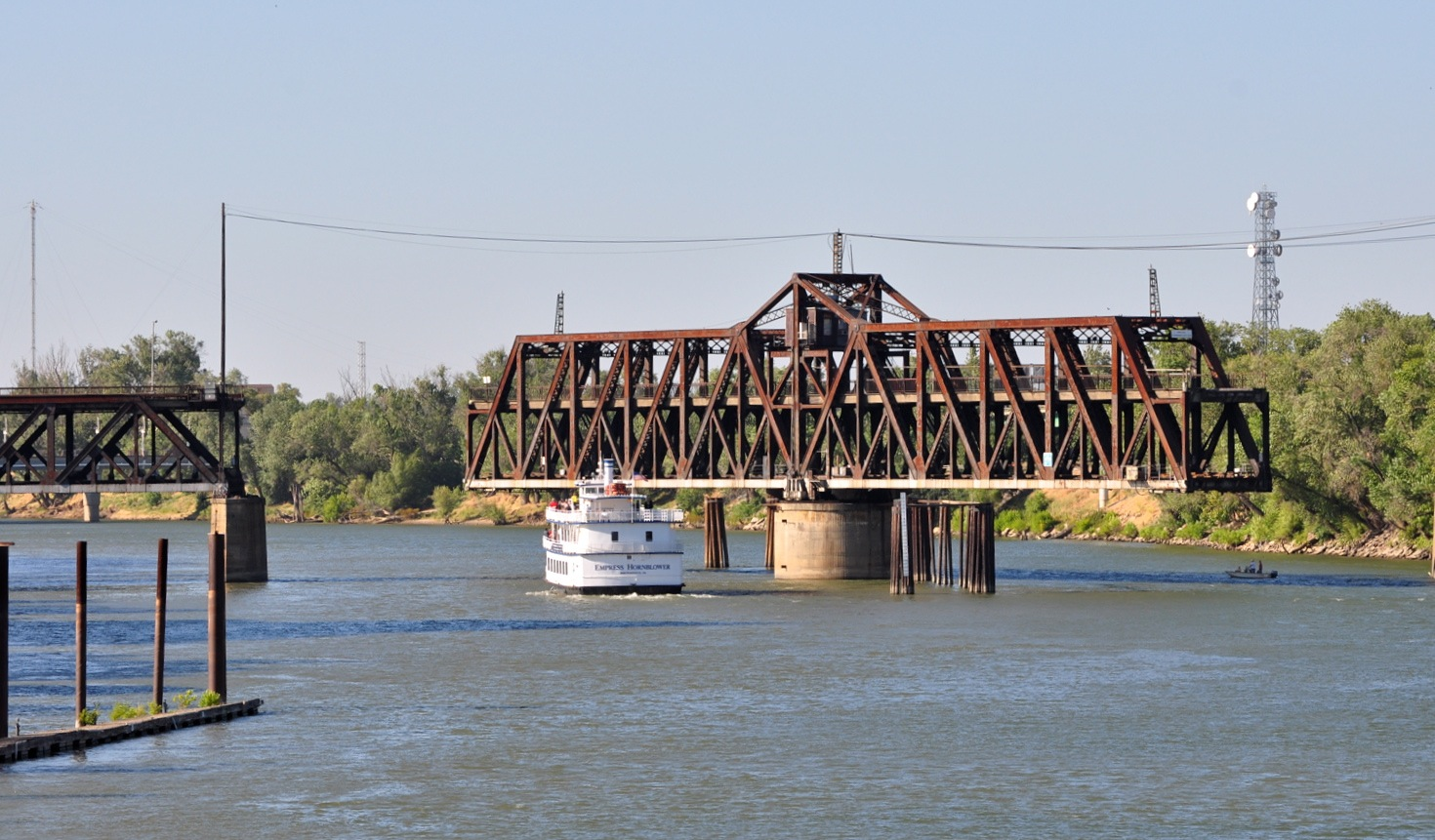
The swing span turned to allow a boat to pass

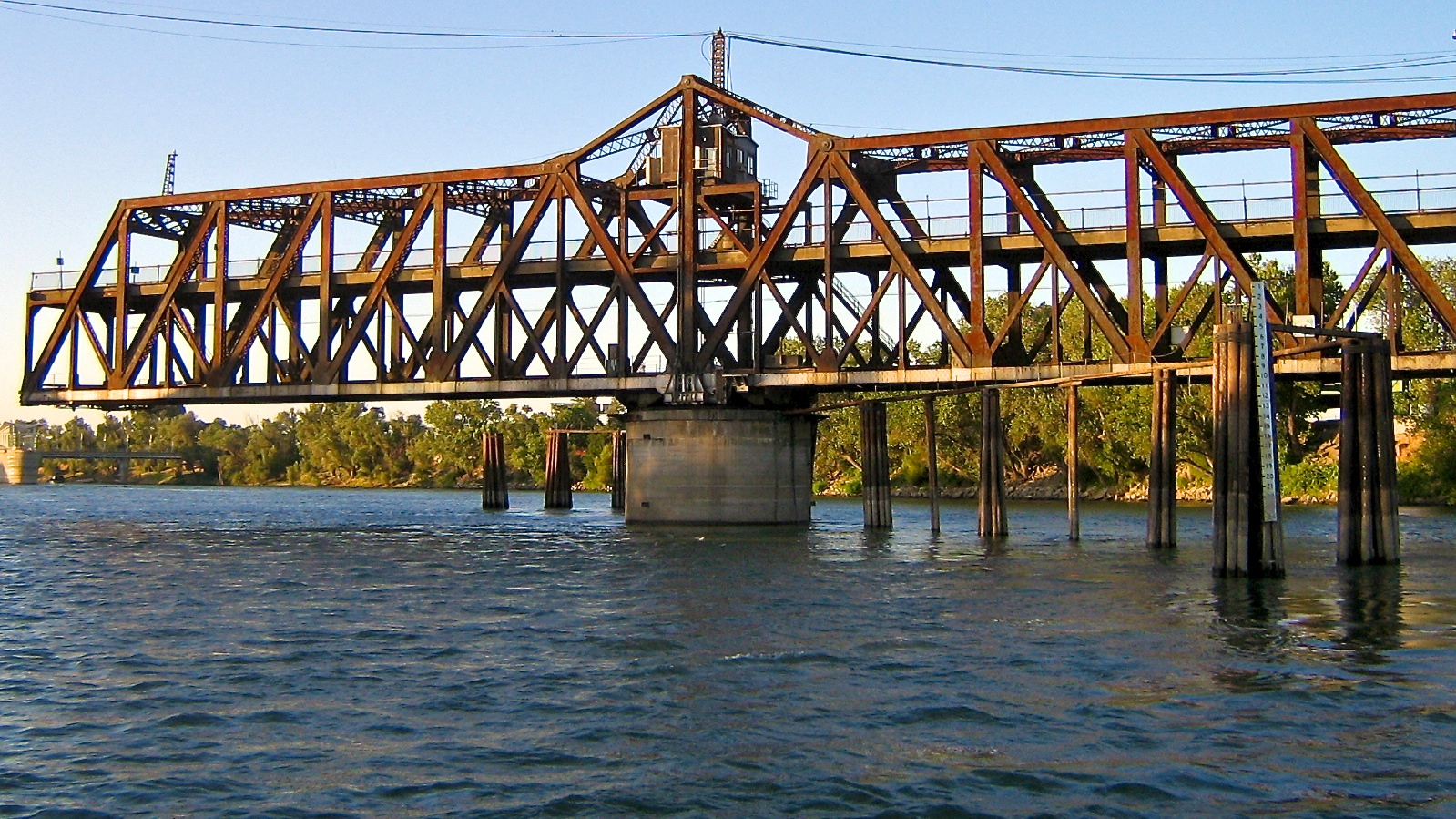
View from the Sacramento River

The Capitol Corridor reverses over the bridge while a tiki bar boat travels up the Sacramento River

== See also ==
- List of crossings of the Sacramento River
