= Mossdale bridge =

Railway bridge in Lathrop, California

Mossdale Bridge
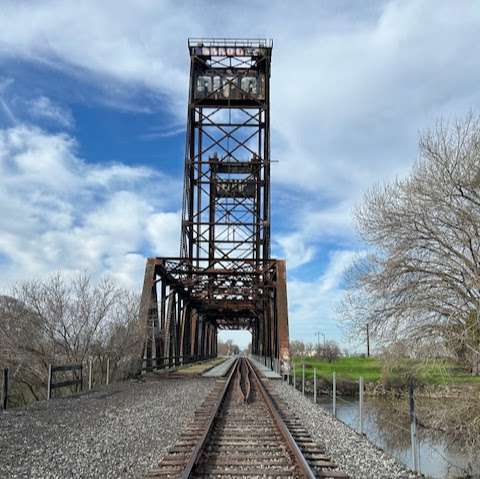
- Mossdale lift bridge crossing the San Joaquin river; looking west (2025), the direction of the first through train on September 6, 1869.
- Carries: Union Pacific Railroad
- Crosses: San Joaquin River
- Locale: Lathrop, California
- Official name: San Joaquin River Bridge
- Other name: Mossdale Railroad Bridge
- Named for: William Simms Moss (1798-1883)

Characteristics
- Design: 1869: wooden Howe Truss cable-stayed swing bridge; 1895: steel through truss swing bridge; 1942: steel Warren through truss with verticals lift bridge.
- Total length: 1869, 1895: 484 ft (148 m); 1942: 474 ft (144 m)
- Longest span: 1869, 1895: 75 ft (23 m) swing span; 1942: 90 ft (27 m) lift span

Rail characteristics
- No. of tracks: 1869:1; 1895:1; 1942:2.
- Track gauge: Standard gauge

History
- Opened: September 6, 1869
- Rebuilt: 1895; 1942

Mossdale Bridge or Mossdale Railroad Bridge is a vertical-lift railway bridge spanning the San Joaquin River in the city of Lathrop, California. The original Mossdale swing bridge, completed by Western Pacific Railroad (1862-1870) on September 6, 1869, was the first bridge built across the San Joaquin River as well as the first railroad bridge built over navigable waters West of the Missouri River. It was also the last link on the first transcontinental railroad from the Missouri River to the Pacific Ocean, as authorized in the 1862 Pacific Railway Acts. The 1869 wooden Howe truss swing bridge at Mossdale was rebuilt in 1895 with steel through truss, while retaining the swing bridge design; it was entirely replaced in 1942 with the current lift bridge design.

== History ==
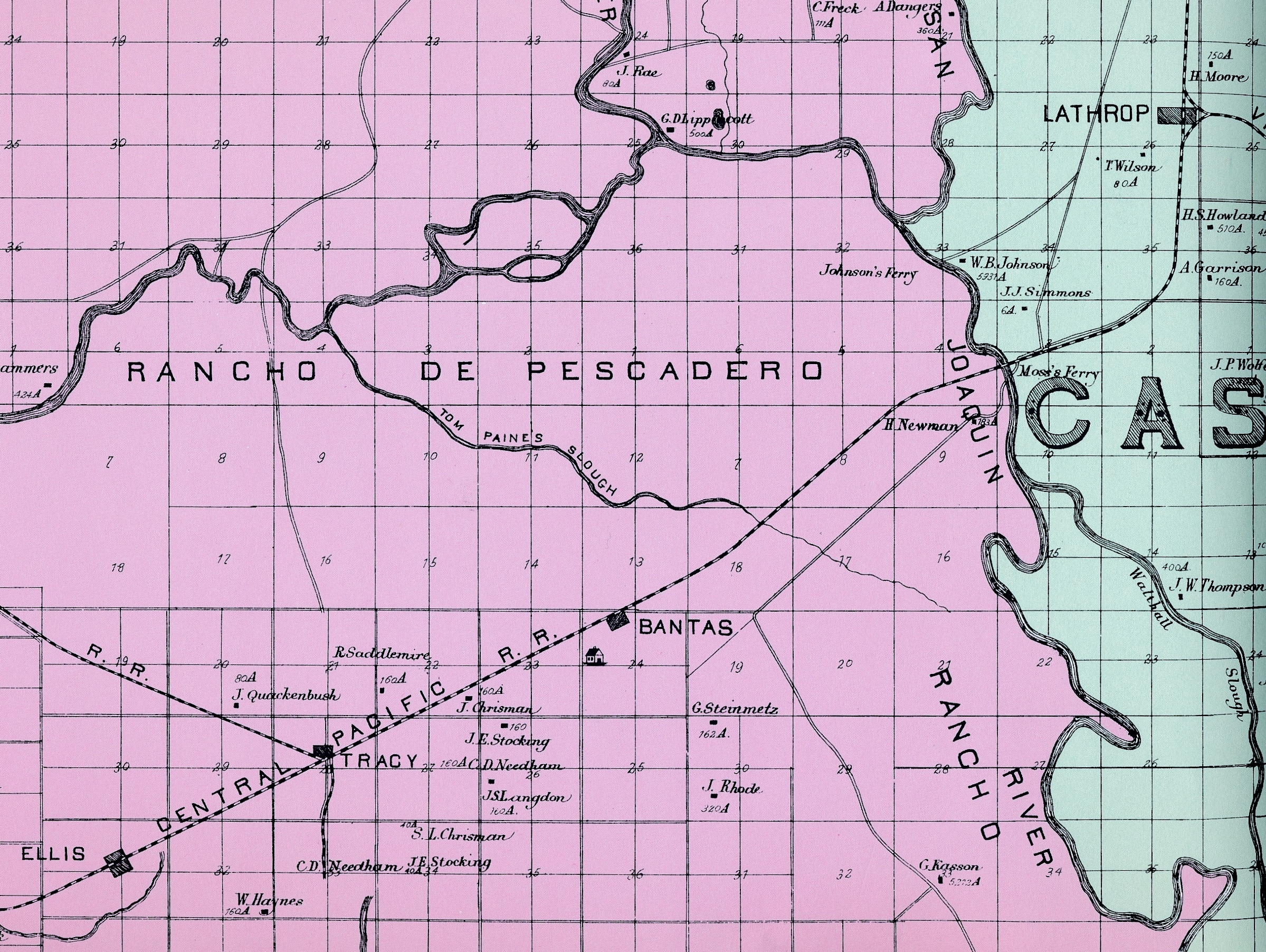
Moss's Ferry (above the big C) was just upstream (south) of the Mossdale bridge; 1879 Thompson & West map of part of San Joaquin County, California

A sharp bend in the San Joaquin River slowed its current to a crawl, allowing sediment to deposit, making the riverbed shallow, and producing a perfect place for a safe ford and a popular fishing grounds for the indigenous Yokuts, centuries before the California gold rush. Later, the Spaniards called it El Pescadero (the fishing place), and during the Mexican land grants, it became the name sake of the Rancho de Pescadero.

After gold was discovered, it was the perfect spot to establish the first ferry across the San Joaquin River, which was accomplished by John Doak and Jacob Bonsell in 1848. It serviced the miners on the well-travelled trail from the San José Mission to the goldfields beyond Stockton and Sacramento. Doak and Bonsell used a long heavy rope stretched from shore to shore to pull a wooden barge to and fro across the river. They had good business, charging one dollar for a footman, three dollars for a man on horseback, and eight dollars for a wagon and horses. In 1856 the ferry was purchased by William S. Moss, a Virginia native and former Ohio riverboat captain, and it became known as Moss' Ferry.

Years later in the early 1860s, Capt. Moss accumulated about 10,000 acres of lowlands (swamp lands) in San Joaquin County, all on the east side of the San Joaquin River south of Stockton. The large valley just east of Moss' Ferry became known as Moss' Dale or Mossdale.

In January 1864, it was revealed that the almost completed surveys on the Western Pacific Railroad from San Jose to Sacramento included the first bridge crossing of the San Joaquin River. But after Chinese workers completed the first 20 miles of railroad from San Jose at the end of September 1866, with about 100 miles to go to Sacramento, Western Pacific ran out of money. Upon the urging of Leland Stanford, Central Pacific picked up Western Pacific with no money transferred in June 1867.

By this time, Central Pacific was heavily focused on their quest to conquer the Sierra Nevada. Only after the Chinese workers pierced the granite in Donner Pass, a major breakthrough for Central Pacific, did Western Pacific, as a new subsidiary of Central Pacific, resume construction, but beginning near Sacramento in February 1868, grading southward towards Stockton and the San Joaquin river. In November 1868, the first timbers for the San Joaquin river crossing arrived. In January 1869, a steam-powered pile driver arrived to began working on the bridge approaches -- several miles of trestle on the swampy lowlands on both sides of the river.

Upon the completion of the Sierra portion of the railroad to Promontory Summit in May 1869, Central Pacific sent more Chinese workers and resources to construct the Western Pacific, and about 200 men were reported working at the bridge site. By June 1869, construction of the bridge substructure was well underway with 1600 tons of cobblestones laid for the foundation of the large pivot pier on the west side of the river.

By August 1869, construction progressed to the bridge superstructure. And the number working on the San Joaquin bridge was boosted up to 600, of which the vast majority 500 were Chinese builders. Even so, by September, the only unfinished stretch of the Western Pacific railroad east of Vallejo Mills was at the bridge.

Mossdale Bridge finally opened on Monday, September 6, 1869, the same day the State Fair opened in Sacramento. The first through train from Sacramento crossed the bridge and arrived at Alameda that evening with a waiting ferry to San Francisco. Scheduled service began immediately on Tuesday, with two trips daily connecting with the overland at Sacramento, 5 hours between Sacramento and San Francisco, and a special State Fair round-trip fare of $3. With that, Mossdale Bridge became the first bridge built across the San Joaquin river as well as the last link of the first transcontinental railroad from the Missouri River to the Pacific Ocean.

One reporter from the San Francisco Call pinpointed the time of the last spike on the last rail to be "on Monday [September 6th] afternoon at 3 o'clock":

"At the hour above named, the workmen had finished laying both ends of the track, and had reached the draw [span] upon the bridge across the San Joaquin river. The train from Sacramento was coming across the plain, when the foremen of the workmen hurried them up with the last rails. They were placed in position, and in a moment more the sledge fell upon the spikes, and they were driven home. The last rail was laid, the last spike was driven, and the workmen, instead of throwing up their hats and giving way to excitement, stepped back and contemplated their work, while the train came up and passed over the bridge. A few hours later, the train reached the Bay of San Francisco, and the connection between the Pacific and the Atlantic Oceans may be said to have been completed."

== Design ==
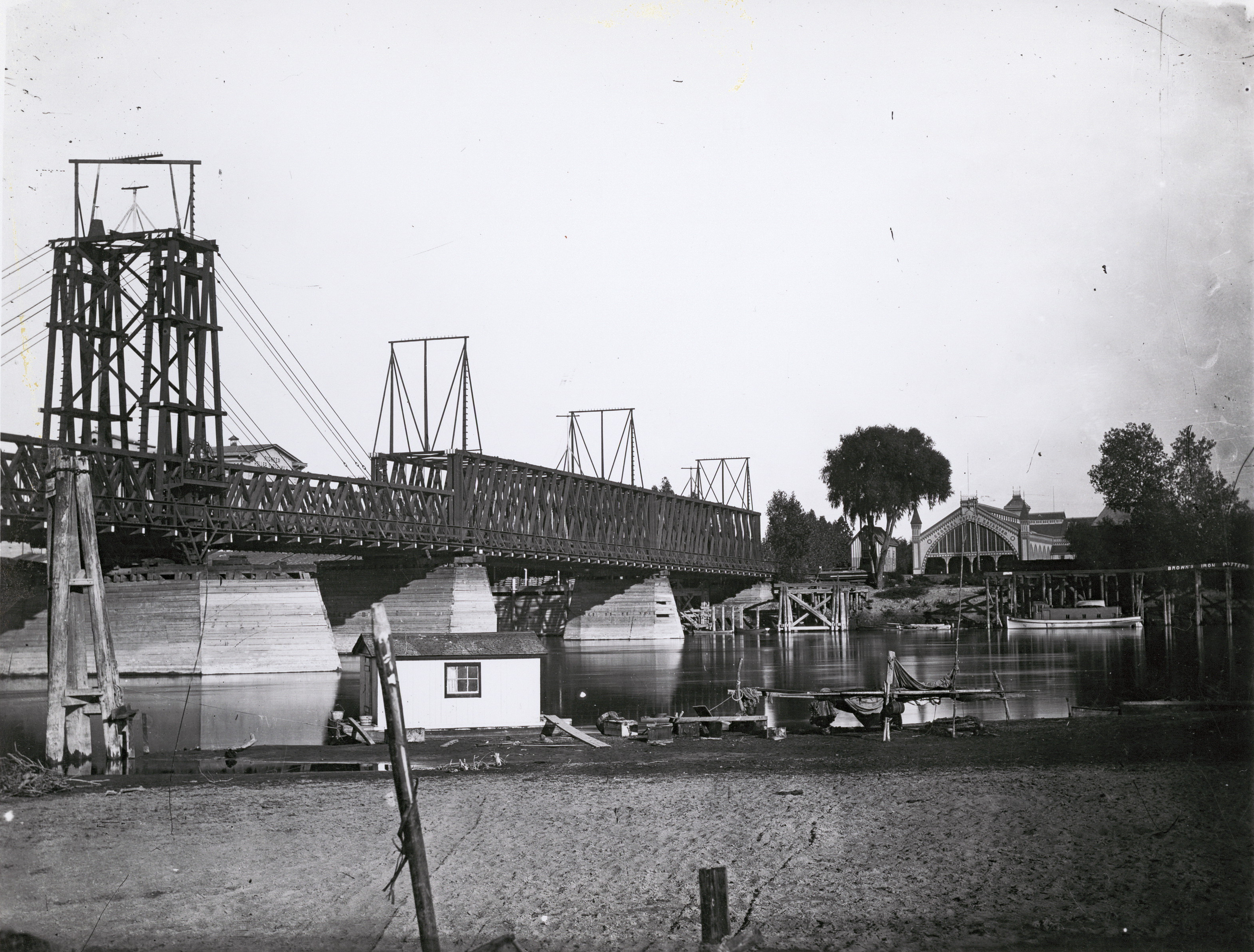
1878 Central Pacific I Street Bridge across the Sacramento River had a similar wooden trestle-tower cable-stabilized swing span design as the 1869 Mossdale bridge.

Mossdale bridge underwent three design iterations. The first iteration in 1869 was a wooden Howe truss swing bridge. Its swing span had a trestle tower with stabilizing cables to the half-through truss. Its fixed spans had wooden Howe through truss, which were later covered to extend the life of the timber. Similar trestle-tower cable-stabilized swing-span designs were used by Central Pacific at two later crossings of the Sacramento River: at Tehama and at Sacramento, in the 1878 and 1895 iterations of the I Street Bridge.

The 1869 wooden first iteration lasted about quarter century. In 1895, Mossdale bridge was rebuilt, retaining the swing bridge design, with steel through truss on both swing and fixed spans as well as with strengthened piers to bear heavier loads.

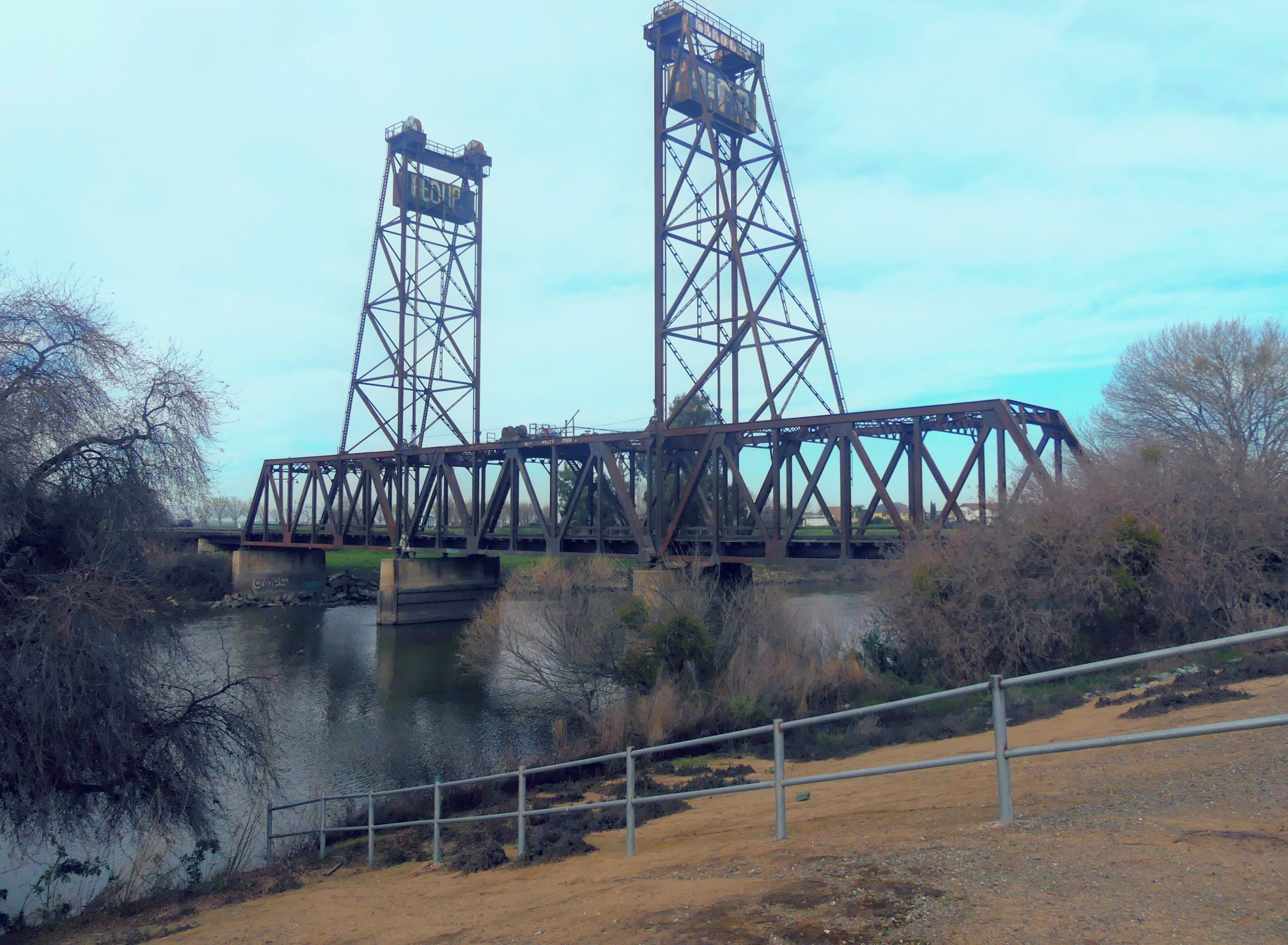
Mossdale lift bridge (2025): Its predecessor, the 1869 Mossdale swing bridge, was the first bridge built across the San Joaquin River as well as the last link on the first transcontinental railroad from the Missouri River to the Pacific.

The 1895 steel second iteration lasted almost half century. In 1942, Mossdale bridge was completely redesigned and widened, with new piers and new steel superstructure. It was designed as a double-track vertical-lift bridge, made with Warren through truss and verticals, which remains the current iteration.

== See also ==
- List of vertical-lift bridges
- California Historical Landmarks in San Joaquin County 780-7, missing.
