= Pont Jacques Chaban-Delmas =

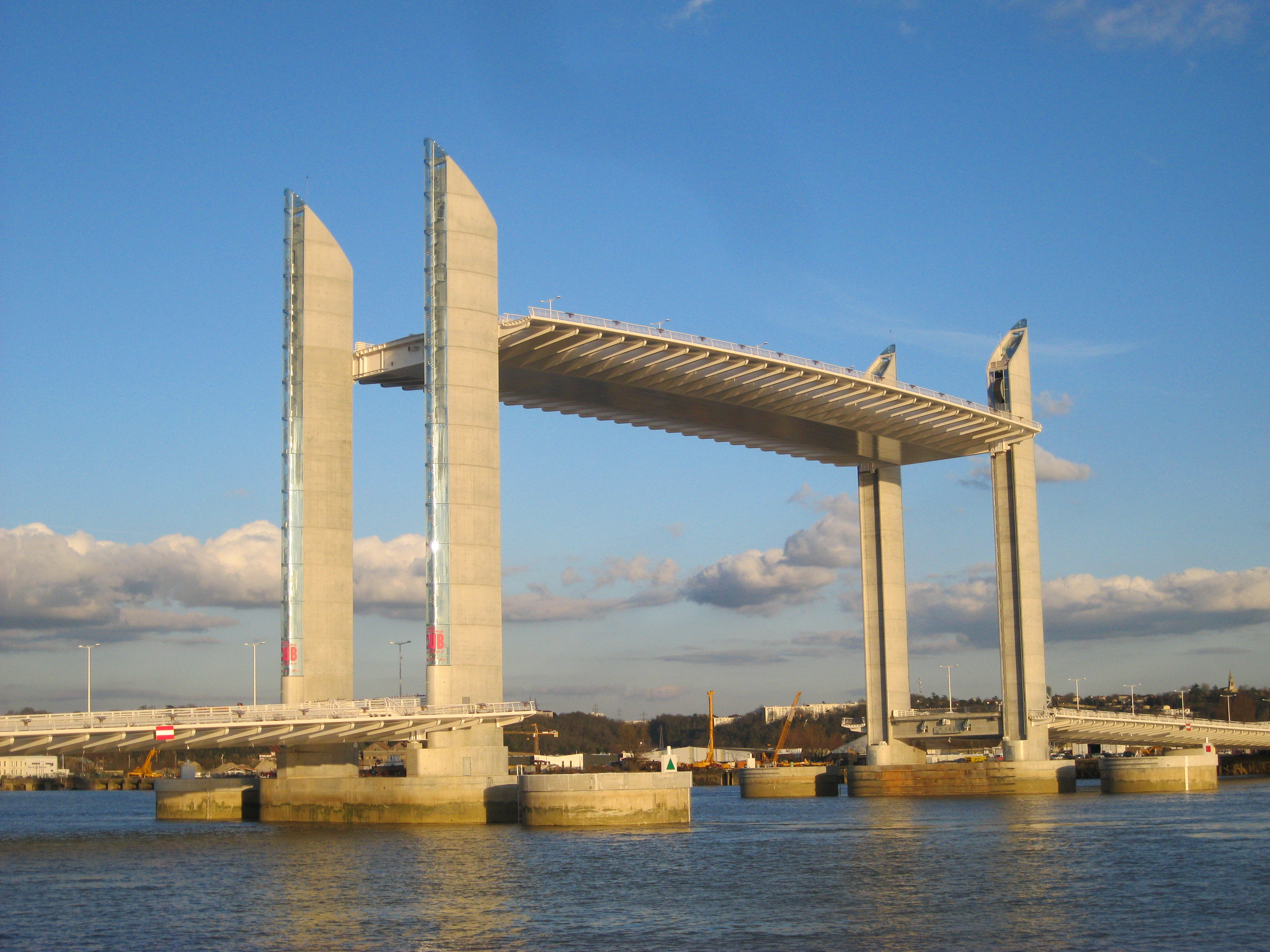
- The Pont Jacques Chaban-Delmas on its inauguration day, 15 March 2013.
- Coordinates: 44°51′30″N 0°33′07″W
- Crosses: Garonne river
- Locale: Bordeaux

Characteristics
- Design: Vertical-lift bridge
- Material: Concrete and steel
- Total length: 575 m (1,886 ft)
- Width: 32 m (105 ft) to 45 m (148 ft)
- Height: 77 m (253 ft)
- Longest span: 110 m (360 ft)

History
- Construction start: 2009
- Construction end: 2012
- Opened: March 2013

Location
- Interactive map of Pont Jacques Chaban-Delmas

The Pont Jacques Chaban-Delmas is a vertical-lift bridge over the Garonne in Bordeaux, France. It was inaugurated on 16 March 2013 by President François Hollande and Alain Juppé, mayor of Bordeaux. Its main span is 110 m (361 ft) long. As of 2013, it is the longest vertical-lift bridge in Europe. It is named in honour of Jacques Chaban-Delmas, a former Prime Minister of France and a former mayor of Bordeaux.
