= Veterans Memorial Bridge (Kaukauna, Wisconsin) =

Vertical Lift Bridge in Kaukauna Wisconsin

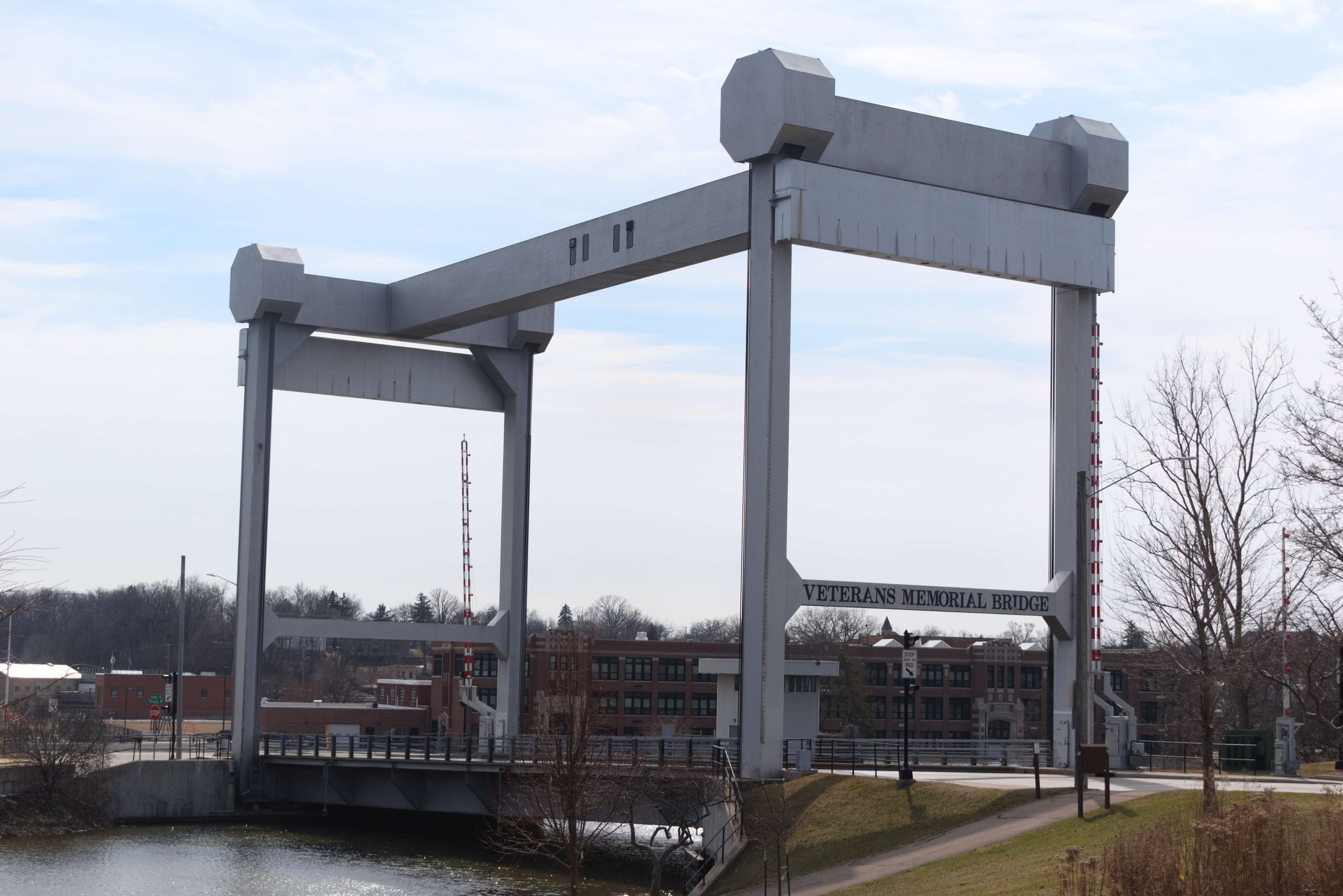
- Veterans Memorial Bridge in 2026
- Coordinates: 44°16′50.8″N 88°15′58.4″W
- Crosses: Fox River (Green Bay tributary)

Characteristics
- Material: Steel
- Total length: 130ft
- Width: 48ft
- No. of spans: 1
- No. of lanes: 2

History
- Construction start: 1982
- Construction end: 1984
- Rebuilt: 2022

Location
- Interactive map of Veterans Memorial Bridge

Veterans Memorial Bridge is a vertical lift bridge built in 1984 crossing the Fox River (Green Bay tributary) in Kaukauna, Wisconsin.

== History ==
The bridge was initially built to allow navigation of the locks as well as to accommodate traffic. However once the locks were permanently closed in 1987 the bridge's lift feature became disused. When the locks were reopened to navigation the City of Kaukauna was required to make the bridge operational again. Inspections began in 2008 and work to restore the bridge to operable condition was completed in 2022.
