= Nickel City =

Nickel City may refer to:

- A nickname for Greater Sudbury, Ontario, Canada
- A nickname for Thompson, Manitoba, Canada
- A nickname for Buffalo, New York, U.S.
