= Thompson station =

Thompson station could refer to:

- Thompson station (LIRR), a former station in Brentwood, New York, United States
- Thompson station (Manitoba), a railway station in Thompson, Manitoba, Canada
- Thompson station (Utah), a former station in Thompson Springs, Utah, United States
