= List of cities in Manitoba =

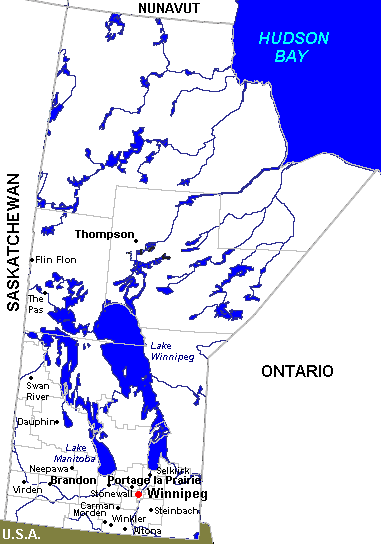
Cities and towns in Manitoba

Manitoba is one of the three Prairie provinces located in Western Canada. According to the 2021 Canadian census, it is the fifth most populous province in Canada with 1,342,153 inhabitants, and the sixth largest province by land area, covering 540,310.19 square kilometres (208,614.93 sq mi). Manitoba currently has 137 municipalities, out of which 10 are categorized as cities.

Cities, towns and villages in Manitoba are referred to as municipalities, specifically urban municipalities, and are formed under the terms of the 1996 Municipal Act. In order for an urban municipality in Manitoba to be labelled as a city, it must have a minimum population of 7,500, although Flin Flon, part of which is in the neighbouring province of Saskatchewan, falls under this threshold. According to the results of the 2022 municipal elections collected by the Association of Manitoba Municipalities, the municipal government of each city contains a mayor; the cities of Winnipeg and Brandon have wards, while the other cities utilize an at-large governing body.

Manitoba's largest city both in population and by land area is Winnipeg, which has 749,607 residents and spans 461.78 square kilometres (178.29 sq mi); the smallest city in population is Flin Flon with 4,940 residents and the smallest by land area is Dauphin, which covers 12.67 square kilometres (4.89 sq mi). Winnipeg is also the oldest incorporated city in Manitoba with its charter being approved by the legislature on November 8, 1873. The most recent city to be incorporated in the province was Morden, on August 24, 2012. Winnipeg is also the capital of Manitoba.

== Cities ==
Largest cities in Manitoba by population

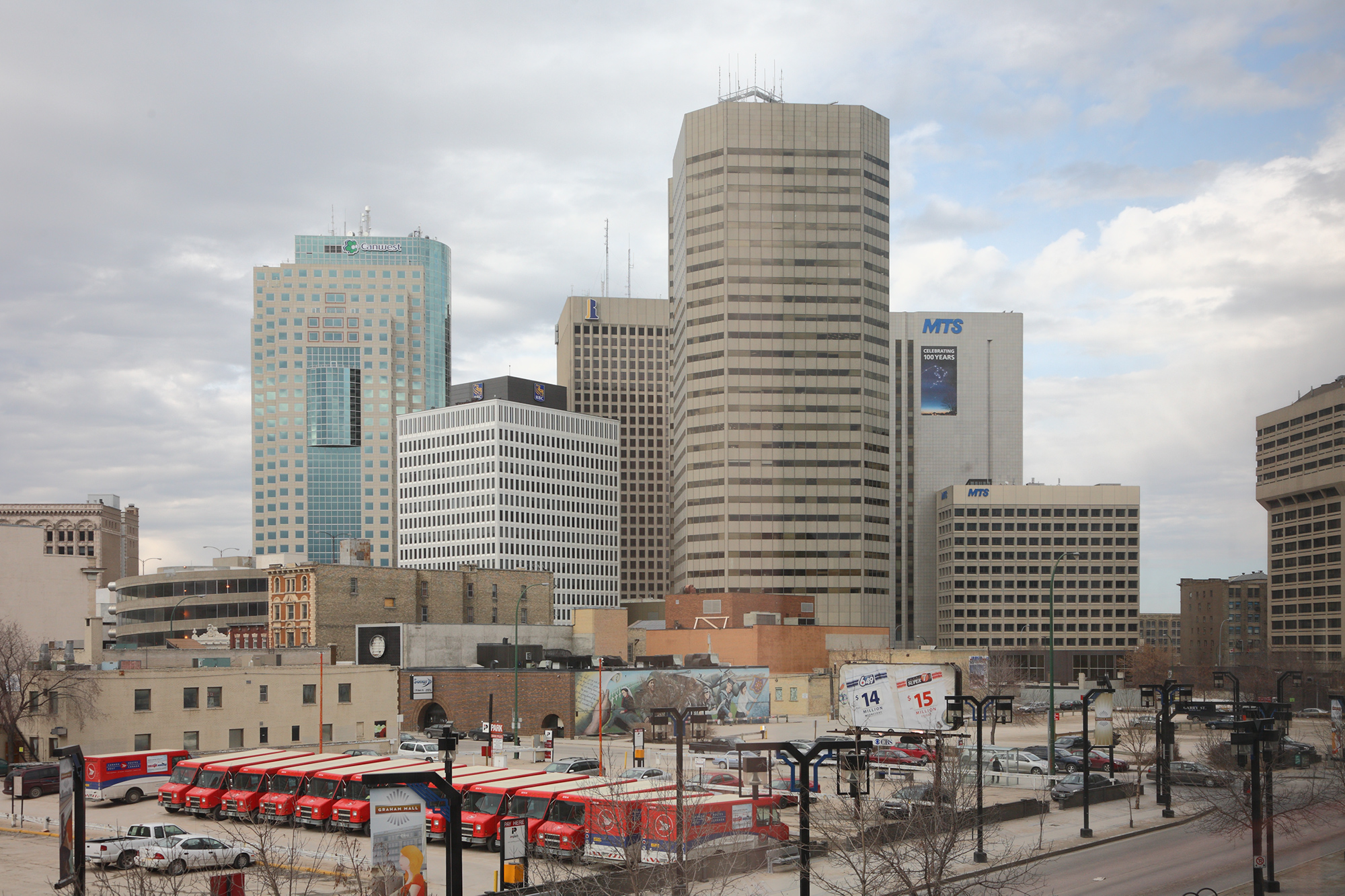
Winnipeg, Manitoba's capital and largest city by both population and land area

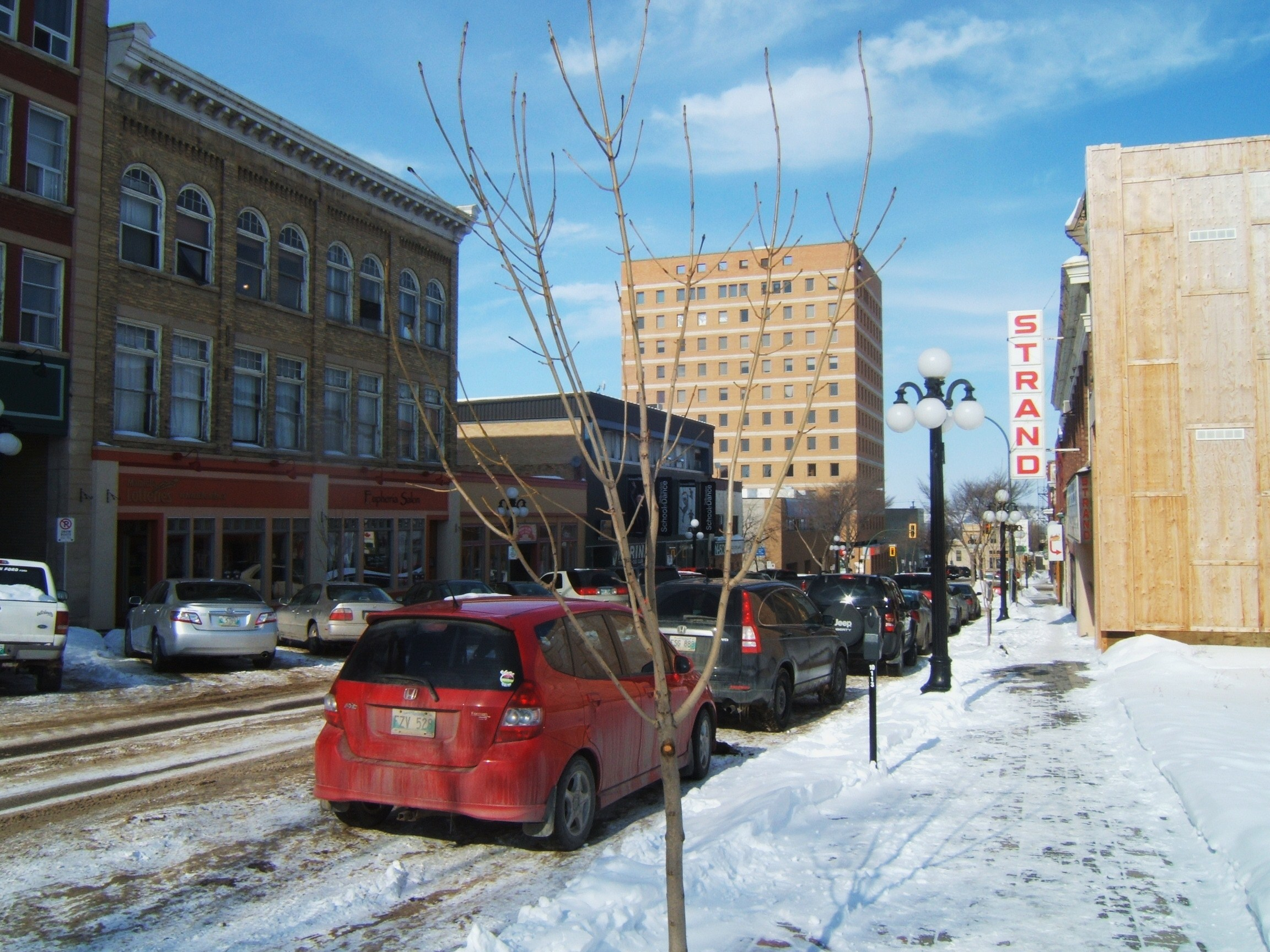
Street view of Brandon, second most populous city in Manitoba

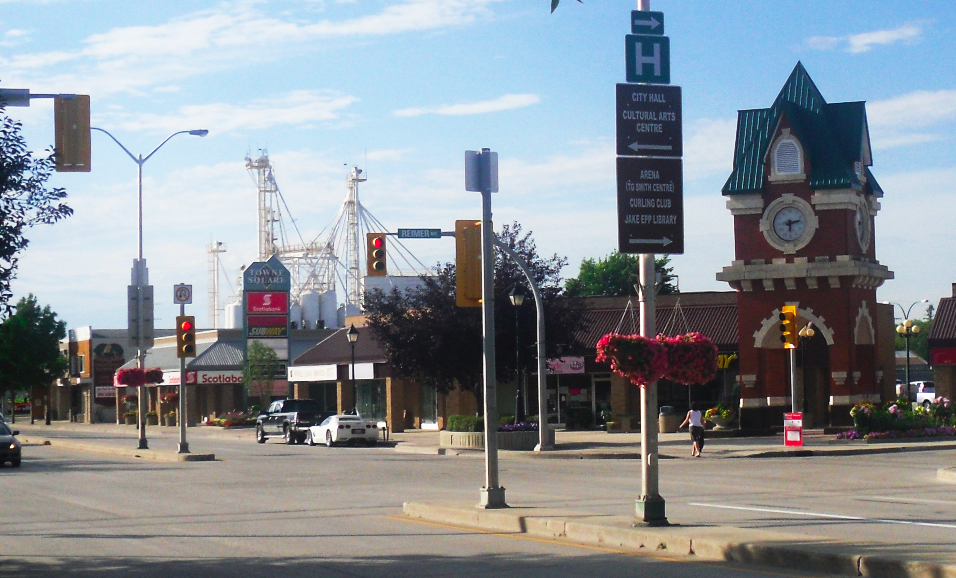
Main Street in Steinbach, Manitoba's third largest city by population

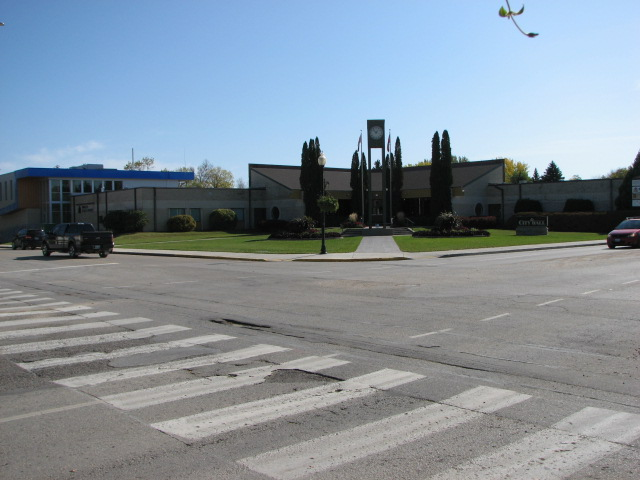
City Hall in Winkler, fourth most populous city in Manitoba

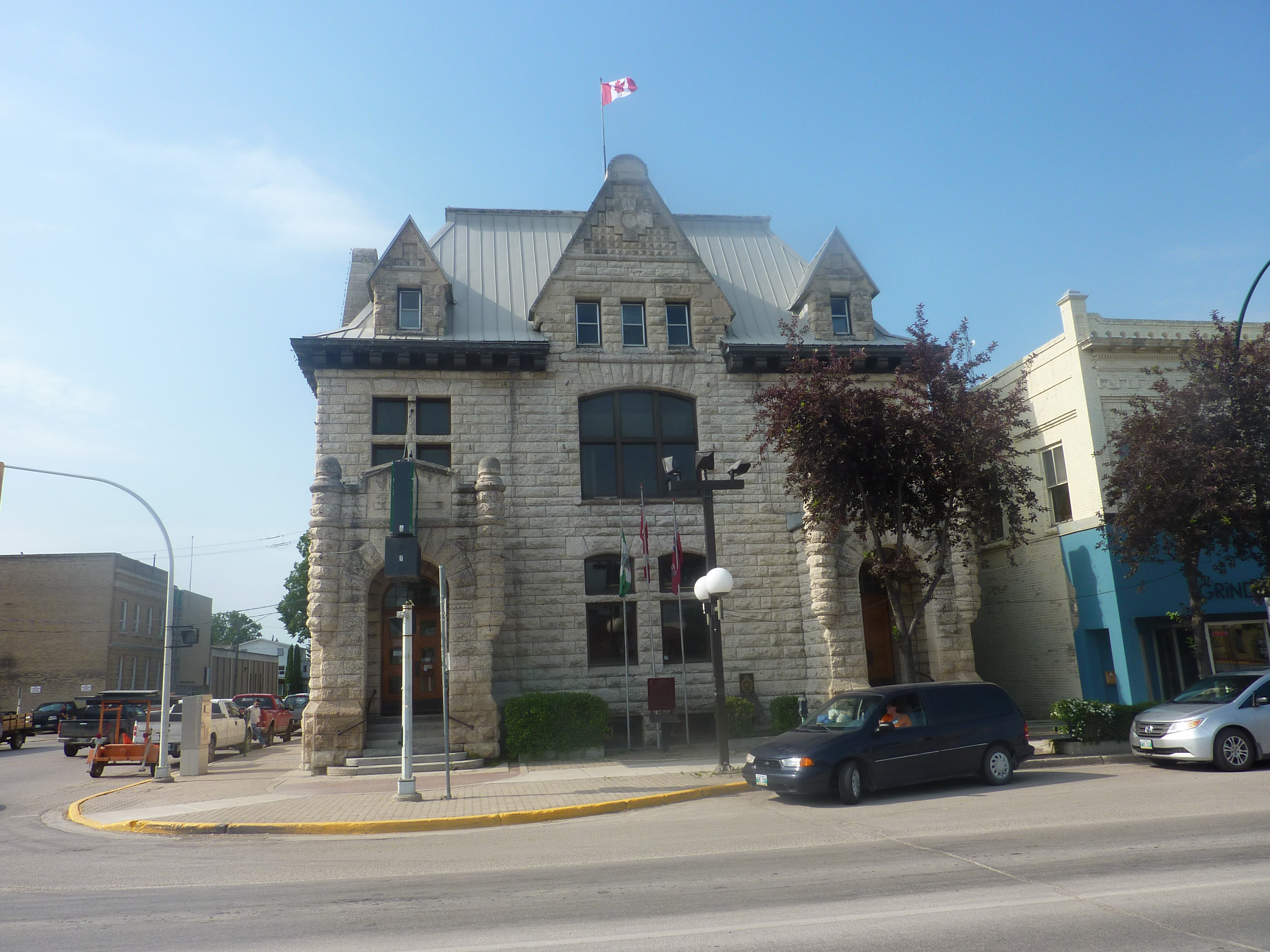
The Portage La Prairie Public Building in Portage La Prairie, fifth most populous city in Manitoba

Cities in Manitoba
Name	Region	Council type	Council size	2021 Canadian census					Incorporation date
Name	Region	Council type	Council size	Population (2021)	Population (2016)	Change	Land area (km^{2})	Population density	Incorporation date
Brandon	Westman	Ward	10	51,313	48,883	+5.0%	79.04	649.2/km^{2}	May 30, 1882
Dauphin	Parkland	At-large	6	8,368	8,369	0.0%	12.67	660.5/km^{2}	March 20, 1998
Flin Flon (part) (Note: Part of Flin Flon is located in Saskatchewan; only the part in Manitoba is included.)	Northern	At-large	6	4,940	4,991	−1.0%	13.14	376.1/km^{2}	June 26, 1970
Morden	Pembina Valley	At-large	6	9,929	8,668	+14.5%	16.29	609.6/km^{2}	August 24, 2012
Portage la Prairie	Central Plains	At-large	6	13,270	13,304	−0.3%	24.72	536.8/km^{2}	February 13, 1907
Selkirk	Interlake & Winnipeg	At-large	6	10,504	10,278	+2.2%	24.47	429.3/km^{2}	June 26, 1998
Steinbach	Eastman	At-large	6	17,806	16,022	+11.1%	37.56	474.1/km^{2}	October 10, 1997
Thompson	Northern	At-large	8	13,035	13,678	−4.7%	16.62	784.3/km^{2}	July 7, 1970
Winkler	Pembina Valley	At-large	6	13,745	12,660	+8.6%	20.73	663.1/km^{2}	April 7, 2002
Winnipeg	Winnipeg	Ward	15	749,607	705,244	+6.3%	461.78	1,623.3/km^{2}	November 8, 1873
All cities				892,517	842,097	+6.0%	707.02	1,262.4/km^{2}	—
Manitoba (Note: The population of Manitoba includes the listed cities as well as the province's other municipalities and population centers.)				1,342,153	1,278,365	+5.0%	540,310.19	2.5/km^{2}	—

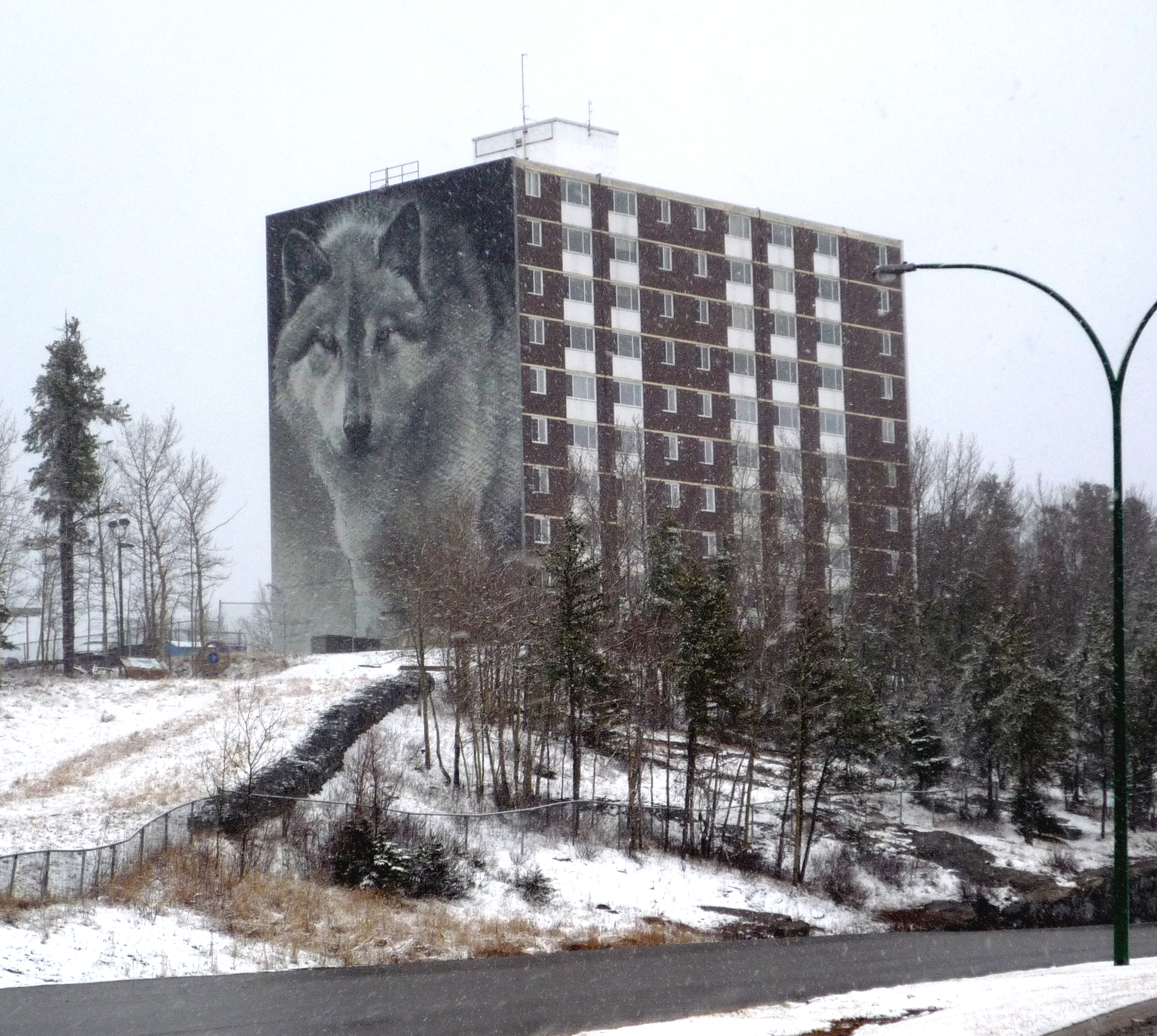
The Spirit Way wolf mural in Thompson, Manitoba's sixth most populous city

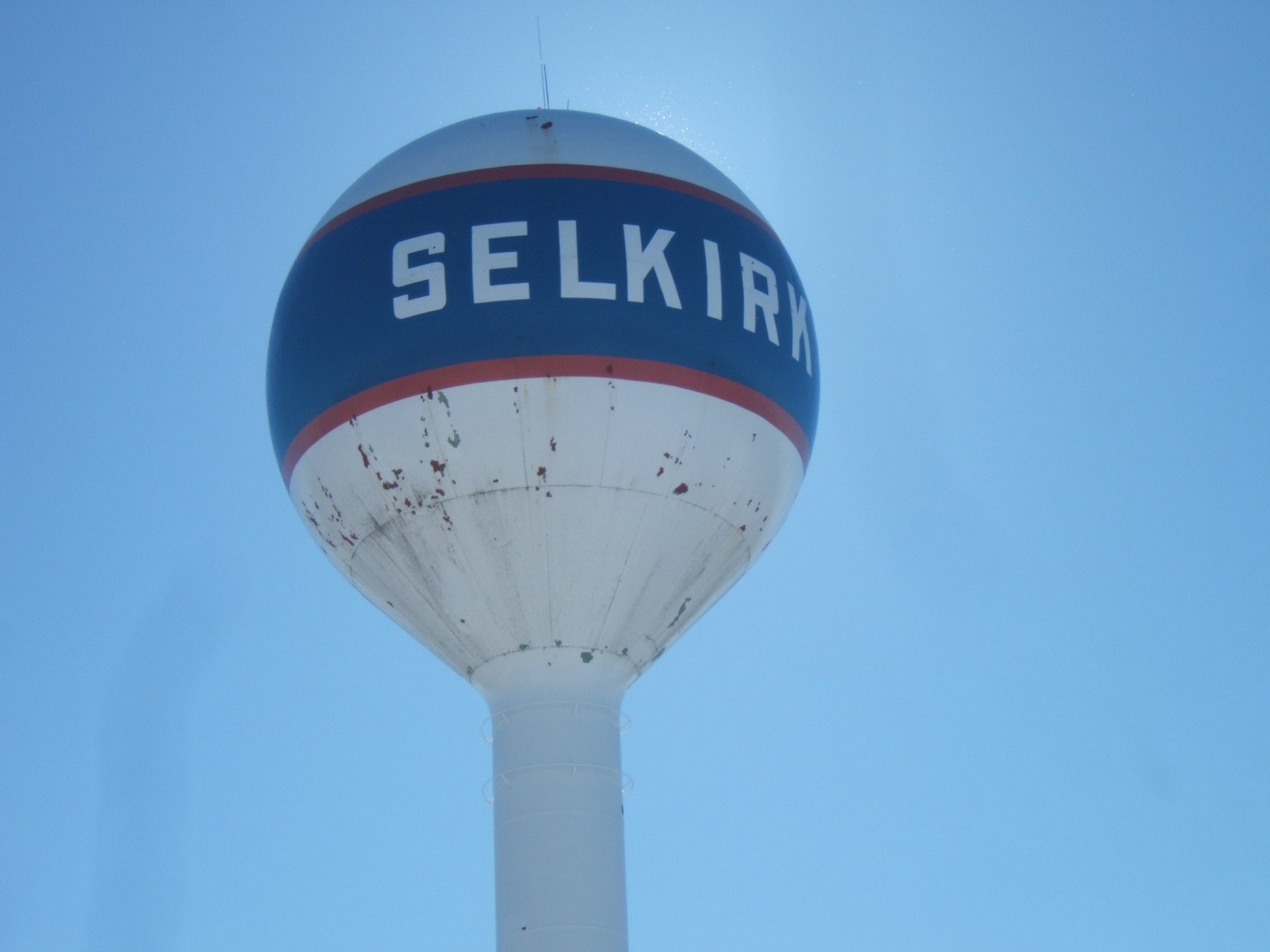
Watertower in Selkirk, Manitoba's seventh most populous city

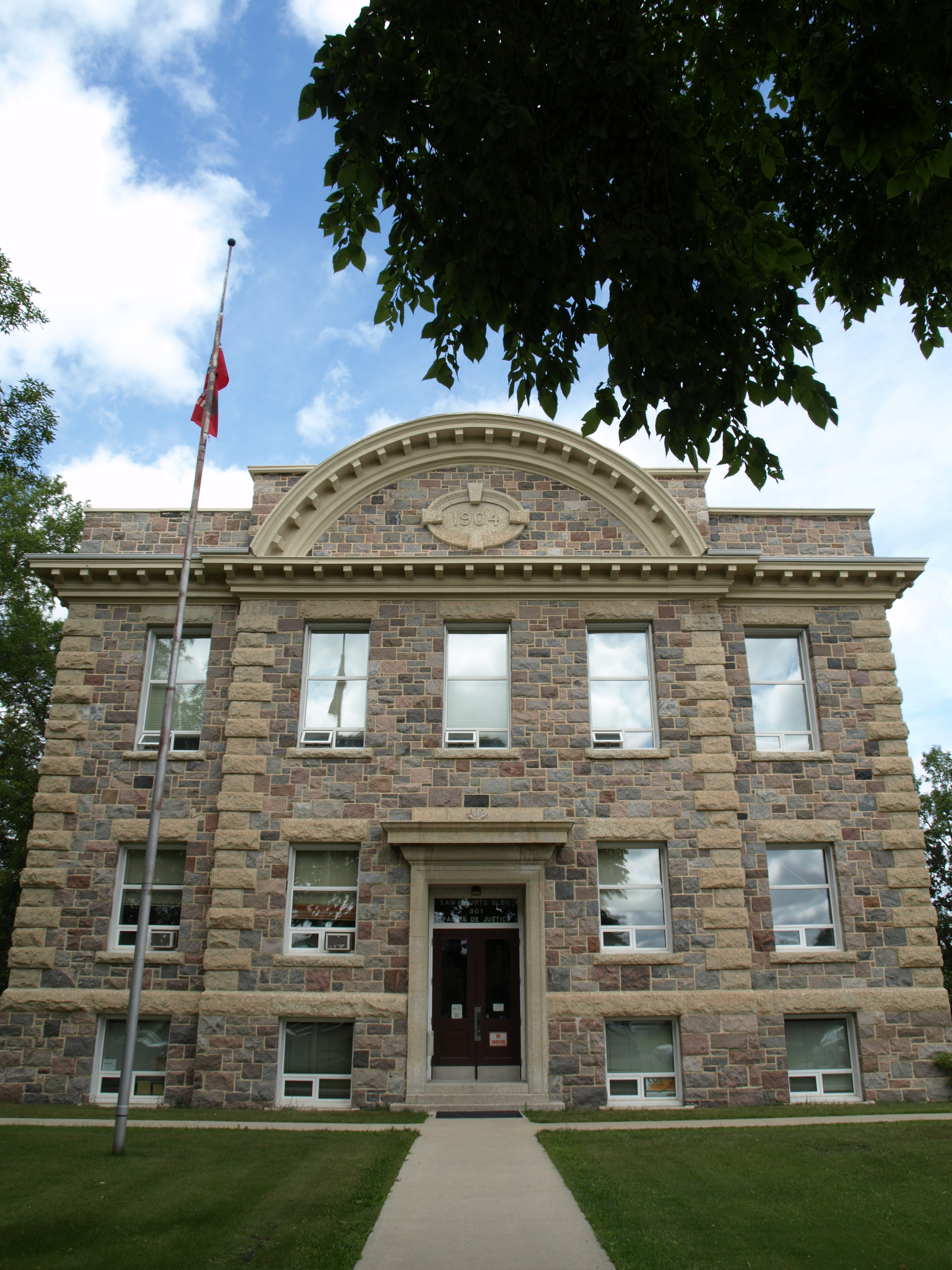
The court house in Morden, Manitoba's third least populous city

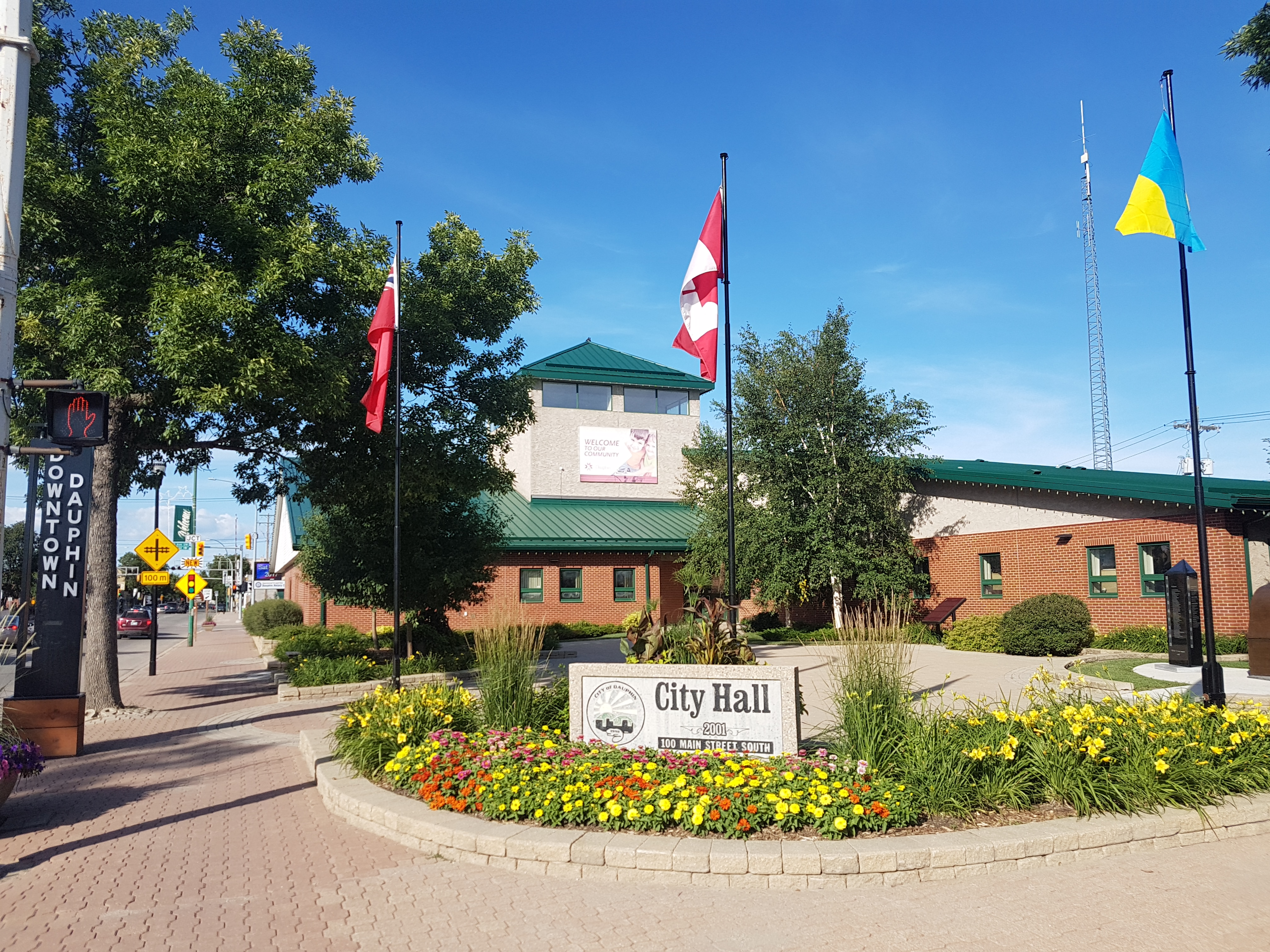
City Hall in Dauphin, second least populous city in Manitoba

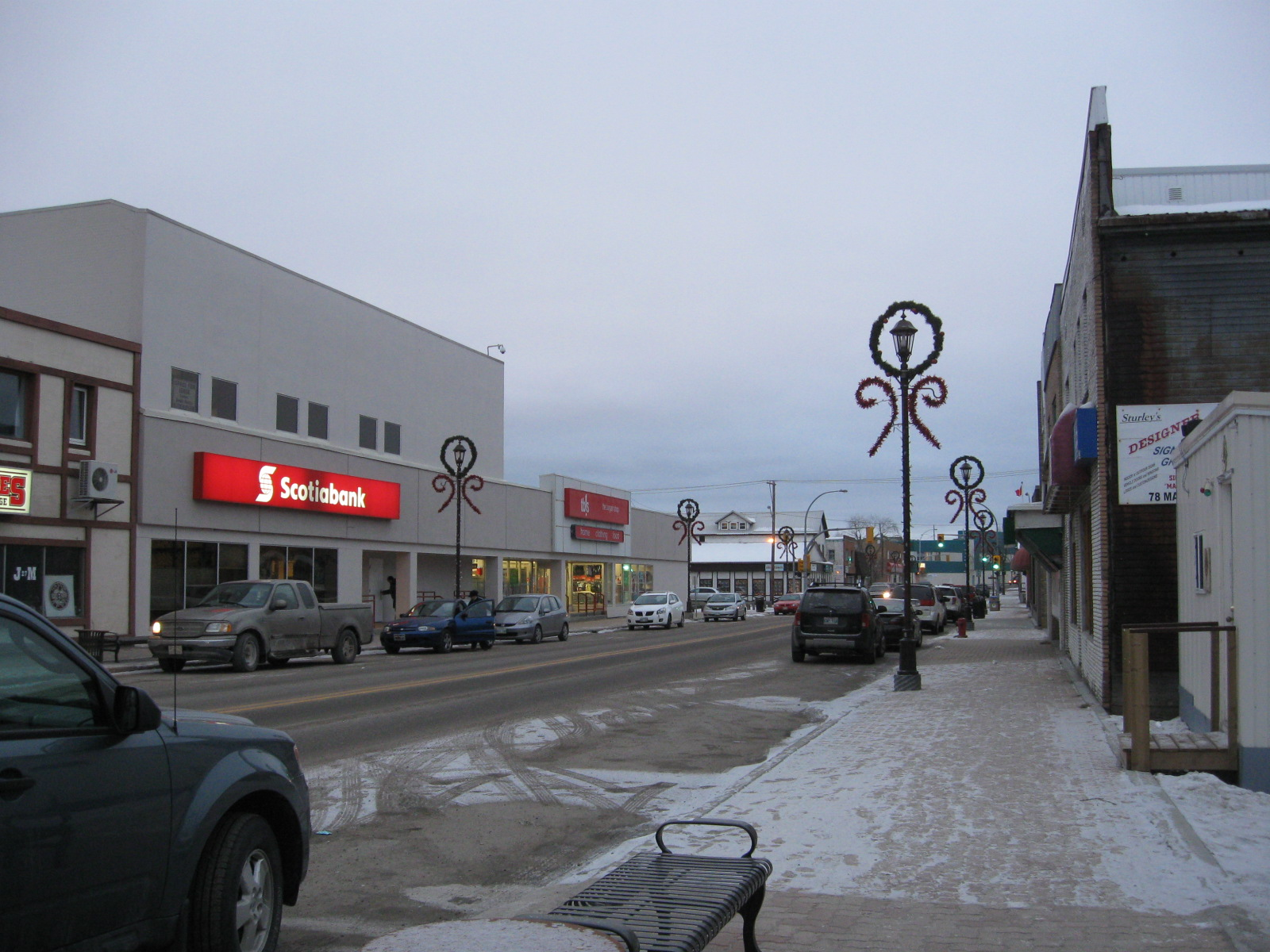
Main Street in Flin Flon, Manitoba's least populous city

== See also ==
- List of communities in Manitoba
- List of ghost towns in Manitoba
- List of municipalities in Manitoba
  - List of rural municipalities in Manitoba
    - List of local urban districts in Manitoba
  - List of towns in Manitoba
  - List of villages in Manitoba
