= Thompson Citizen =

- Type: Weekly newspaper
- Owner: Glacier Media
- Founder: Wellington "Duke" DeCoursey
- Publisher: Noah Cooke
- Founded: 1960; 65 years ago
- Language: English
- Headquarters: 141 Commercial Place; Thompson, Manitoba; R8N 1T1
- Website: thompsoncitizen.net

The Thompson Citizen is a Canadian newspaper, the longest-running newspaper in Thompson, Manitoba.

== History ==
Wellington "Duke" DeCoursey founded the newspaper in 1960 after moving to Thompson from Dauphin, Manitoba, where he published the Central Manitoba News. DeCoursey started other local newspapers, including the News of the North and the Birch River Reporter, as well as authoring books on Canada's north and early Alberta.

The newspaper changed from being a weekly publication to printing four editions a week by 1966, before regressing back to a weekly.

Duke and Maude DeCoursey published the newspaper until 1971 when it was amalgamated with the Nickel Belt News forming Precambrian Press, which was the DeCoursey family and the Grant Wright family. Duke and Maude moved to Squamish, British Columbia, to develop a mobile home park in 1973, selling their shares in Precambrian Press. Maude died in 1993 and Duke died in 1994.

Grant and Joan Wright ran the operation with their kids until a few years back when Grant died. Joan left most of the operations to Carolyn Wright, who was the managing editor for a number of years.

On January 2, 2007, Precambrian Press sold the Thompson Citizen to Boundary Publishers of Estevan, Saskatchewan, which was later purchased by Glacier Media.

On January 2, 2009, the newspaper became free to area residents. In April 2009, the newspaper established a website.

In December 2024, the newspaper announced it will close but did not give a specific date for its last issue. It ceased in January 2025.

== See also ==
- List of newspapers in Canada
