= Thompson station (Manitoba) =

Railway station in Manitoba, Canada

Thompson
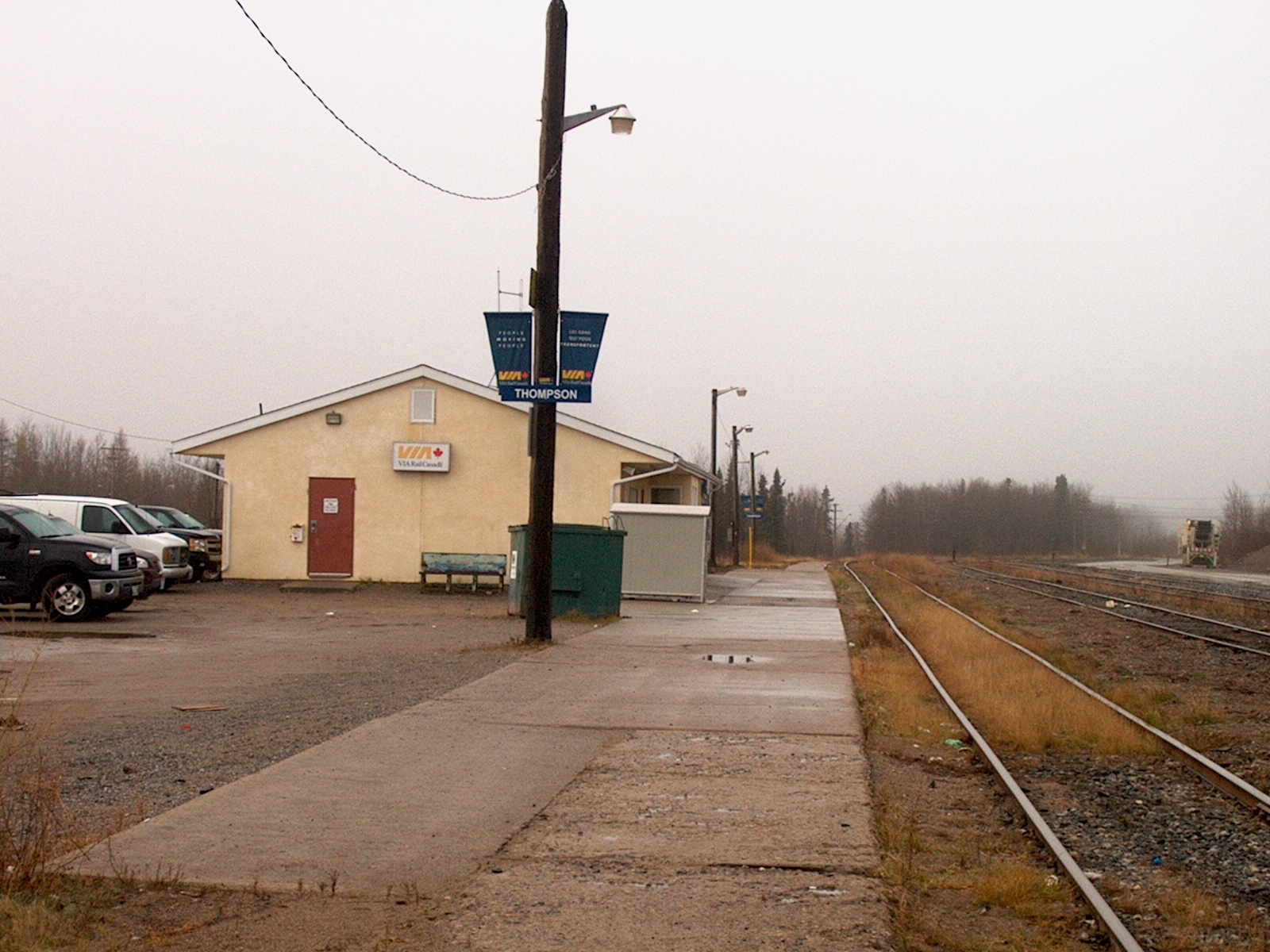

General information
- Location: 1310 Station Road; Thompson, Manitoba
- Coordinates: 55°44′26″N 97°49′48″W
- Platforms: 1

Construction
- Structure type: Station building with animal cage, baggage room, telephones and washrooms
- Parking: Free

Other information
- Status: Staffed station

Services
Preceding station	Via Rail	Following station
Sipiwesk toward Churchill	Winnipeg–Churchill	Leven toward Winnipeg
Former services
Preceding station	Canadian National Railway	Following station
Terminus	Thompson Branch opened 1958	Parlee toward Sipiwesk
Location

Thompson station is a railway station in Thompson, Manitoba, Canada. The stop is served by Via Rail's Winnipeg–Churchill train. The station is located about 1 kilometre (0.62 miles) from downtown, near the industrial park. The specially designed station building was constructed in 1960 by the Canadian National Railway to serve the newly established mining city.

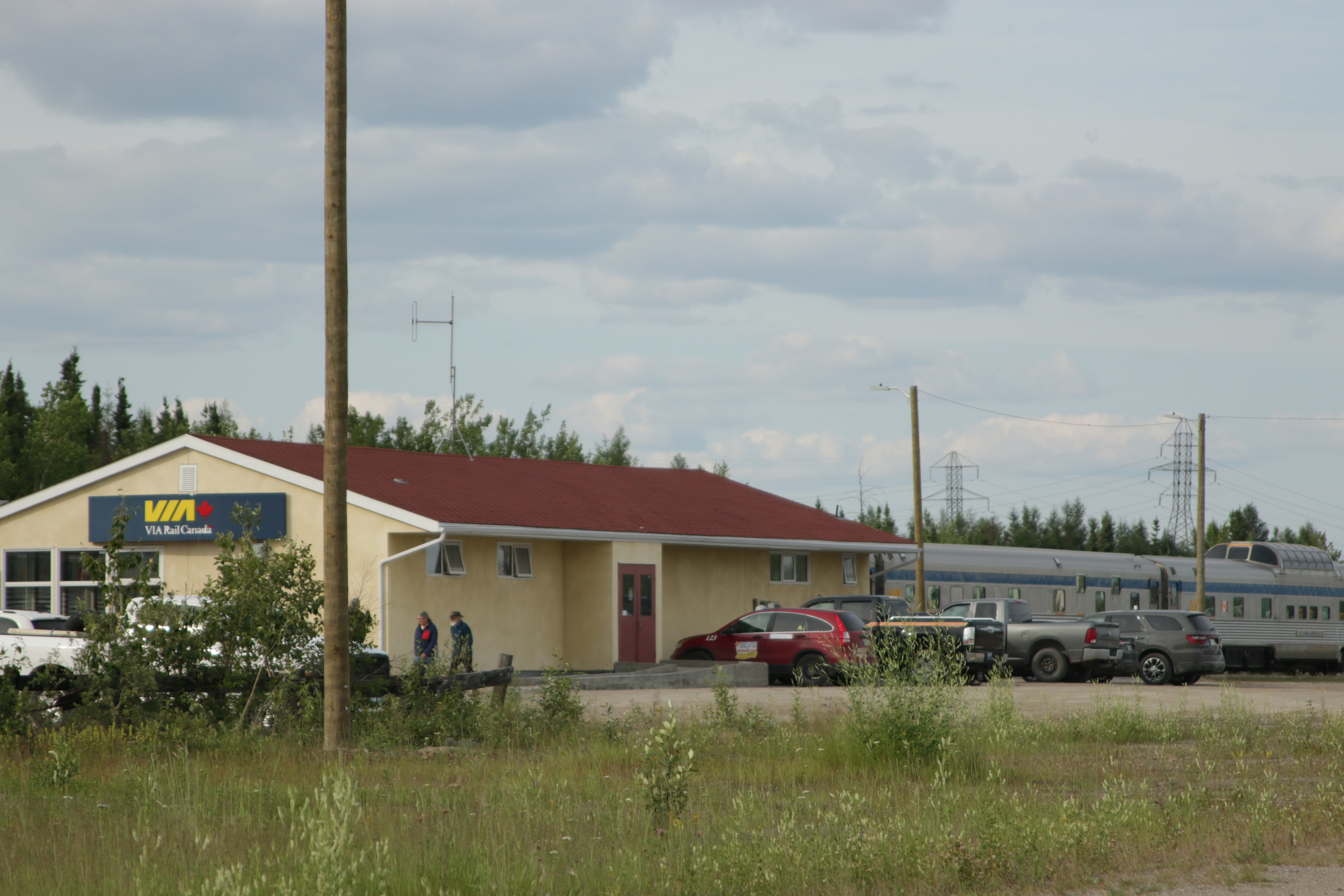
Thompson station in 2019 during a layover of a Northbound train from Winnipeg to Churchill
