= 2022 Manitoba municipal elections =

- October 26, 2022

Municipal elections were held in the Canadian province of Manitoba on October 26, 2022. Mayors, councils and school board trustees were elected in the 135 municipalities holding elections.

64 municipalities, approximately 47.5%, had their mayor or reeve acclaimed due to no other candidates running, with one municipality not putting up any candidates.

860 members were elected, out of 1380 original candidates, with only 55.2% of candidates being reelected overall, only 45.5% of mayoral candidates being reelected.

Selected mayoral and council results are as follows:

== Brandon ==
Results for the city of Brandon are as follows:

=== Mayoral election ===
Mayoral candidate	Vote	%
Jeff Fawcett	4,759	72.81
Elliot Oleson	1,777	27.19

=== Brandon City Council ===
Candidate	Vote	%
Assiniboine
Heather Karrouze	371	36.99
Kevin Chambers	229	22.83
Richard Bruce	162	16.15
Jo-Ann Pasklivich	155	15.45
Jeff Plas	86	8.57
Rosser
Kris Desjarlais (X)	261	63.20
Phillip Emmerson	130	31.48
Dale Bates	22	5.33
Victoria
Barry Cullen (X)	552	58.66
Quentin Derhak	389	41.34
University
Shaun Cameron (X)	Acclaimed	
Meadows-Waverly
Greg Hildebrand	551	77.82
Sunday Frangi (X)	157	22.18
South Centre
Bruce Luebke (X)	Acclaimed	
Linden Lanes
Shawn Berry (X)	Acclaimed	
Richmond
Jason Splett	332	75.45
Michael McCormick	108	24.55
Riverview
Glen Parker (X)	Acclaimed	
Green Acres
Tyson Tame	370	51.01
Ben Welsh	134	19.56
Olivia Boyce	91	13.28
Franco Chartier	90	13.14

== Brokenhead ==
Results for reeve in the Rural Municipality of Brokenhead are as follows:

=== Reeve ===
Reeve candidate	Vote	%
Brad Saluk (X)	Acclaimed	

== Dauphin ==
Results for mayor in Dauphin are as follows:

=== Mayor ===
Mayoral candidate	Vote	%
David Bosiak	1,995	74.14
Kerri Riehl	696	25.86

== East St. Paul ==
Results for mayor in the Rural Municipality of East St. Paul are as follows:

=== Mayor ===
Mayoral candidate	Vote	%
Carla Devlin	1,653	60.64
Lawrence Morris	430	39.36

== Flin Flon ==
Results for mayor in Flin Flon are as follows:

=== Mayor ===
Mayoral candidate	Vote	%
George Fontaine	551	41.93
Tim Babcock	423	32.19
Leslie J. Beck	340	25.88

== Gimli ==
Results for mayor in the Rural Municipality of Gimli are as follows:

=== Mayor ===
Mayoral candidate	Vote	%
Kevin Chudd	1,483	53.10
Lynn Greenberg (X)	1,310	46.80

== Hanover ==
Results for reeve in the Rural Municipality of Hanover are as follows:

=== Reeve ===
Reeve candidate	Vote	%
Jim Funk	1,949	77.96
Donald Bouchard	551	22.04

== La Broquerie ==
Results for reeve in the Rural Municipality of La Broquerie are as follows:

=== Reeve ===
Reeve candidate	Vote	%
Ivan Normandeau	890	58.36
Lewis Weiss (X)	635	41.64

== Macdonald ==
Results for reeve in the Rural Municipality of Macdonald are as follows:

=== Reeve ===
Reeve candidate	Vote	%
Brad Erb (X)	Acclaimed	

== Morden ==
Results for mayor in Morden are as follows:

=== Mayor ===
Mayoral candidate	Vote	%
Brandon Burley (X)	Acclaimed	

== Neepawa ==
Results for mayor in Neepawa are as follows:

=== Mayor ===
Mayoral candidate	Vote	%
Brian Hedley	Acclaimed	

== Niverville ==
Results for mayor in the town of Niverville are as follows:

=== Mayor ===
Mayoral candidate	Vote	%
Myron Dyck	Acclaimed	

== Portage la Prairie (city) ==
Results for mayor in the city of Portage la Prairie are as follows:

=== Mayor ===
Mayoral candidate	Vote	%
Sharilyn Knox	2,199	65.27
Bryon Hamilton	870	25.82
John Donald Pelechaty	226	6.71
Mohammad Tahir Khan	74	2.20

== Portage la Prairie (RM) ==
Results for reeve in the Rural Municipality of Portage la Prairie are as follows:

=== Reeve ===
Reeve candidate	Vote	%
Kameron Blight (X)	Acclaimed	

== Rhineland ==
Results for reeve in the Municipality of Rhineland are as follows:

=== Reeve ===
Reeve candidate	Vote	%
Don Wiebe (X)	Acclaimed	

== Ritchot ==
Results for mayor in the Rural Municipality of Ritchot are as follows:

=== Mayor ===
Mayoral candidate	Vote	%
Chris Ewen (X)	Acclaimed	

== Rockwood ==
Results for reeve in the Rural Municipality of Rockwood are as follows:

=== Reeve ===
Reeve candidate	Vote	%
Wes Taplin (X)	Acclaimed	

== Selkirk ==
Results for mayor in Selkirk are as follows:

=== Mayor ===
Mayoral candidate	Vote	%
Larry Johannson (X)	1,471	63.57
Morgan Steele Seman	843	36.43

== Springfield ==
Results for mayor in the Rural Municipality of Springfield are as follows:

=== Mayor ===
Mayoral candidate	Vote	%
Patrick Therrien	3,305	62.11
Tiffany Fell (X)	1,506	28.30
Edwin Giesbrecht	510	9.58

== St. Andrews ==
Results for mayor in the Rural Municipality of St. Andrews are as follows:

=== Mayor ===
Mayoral candidate	Vote	%
Joy Sul (X)	2,138	60.45
John Preun	1399	39.55

== Stanley ==
Results for reeve in the Rural Municipality of Stanley are as follows:

=== Reeve ===
Reeve candidate	Vote	%
Ike Friesen	Acclaimed	

== St. Clements ==
Results for mayor in the Rural Municipality of St. Clements are as follows:

=== Mayor ===
Mayoral candidate	Vote	%
Debbie Fielbelkorn (X)	Acclaimed	

== Ste. Anne (RM) ==
Results for reeve in the Rural Municipality of Ste. Anne are as follows:

=== Reeve ===
Reeve candidate	Vote	%
Richard Pelletier	373	56.01
Paul Saindon (X)	293	43.99

== Steinbach ==
Results for mayor in the city of Steinbach are as follows:

=== Mayor ===
Mayoral candidate	Vote	%
Earl Funk (X)	Acclaimed	

== Stonewall ==
Results for mayor in the town of Stonewall are as follows:

=== Mayor ===
Mayoral candidate	Vote	%
Sandra Smith	1,129	57.34
Clive Hinds (X)	840	42.66

== Taché ==
Results for mayor in the Rural Municipality of Taché are as follows:

=== Mayor ===
Mayoral candidate	Vote	%
Armand Poirier	1,442	57.50
Justin Bohemier (X)	1,066	42.50

== The Pas ==
Results for mayor in the town of The Pas are as follows:

=== Mayor ===
Mayoral candidate	Vote	%
Andre Murphy	722	63.00
Jennifer Cook	424	37.00

== Thompson ==
Results in Thompson were as follows:

=== Mayor ===
Mayoral candidate	Vote	%
Colleen Smook (X)	964	46.73
Lee Ellsworth	711	34.46
Ron Matechuk	388	18.81

== West St. Paul ==
Results for mayor in the Rural Municipality of West St. Paul are as follows:

=== Mayor ===
Mayoral candidate	Vote	%
Peter Truijen	1,176	53.19
Cheryl Christian (X)	1,035	46.81

== Winkler ==
Results for mayor in the city of Winkler are as follows:

=== Mayor ===
Mayoral candidate	Vote	%
Henry Siemens	3,358	87.02
Karl Krebs	501	12.98
