= Thompson, Manitoba =

Thompson
- City
- City of Thompson
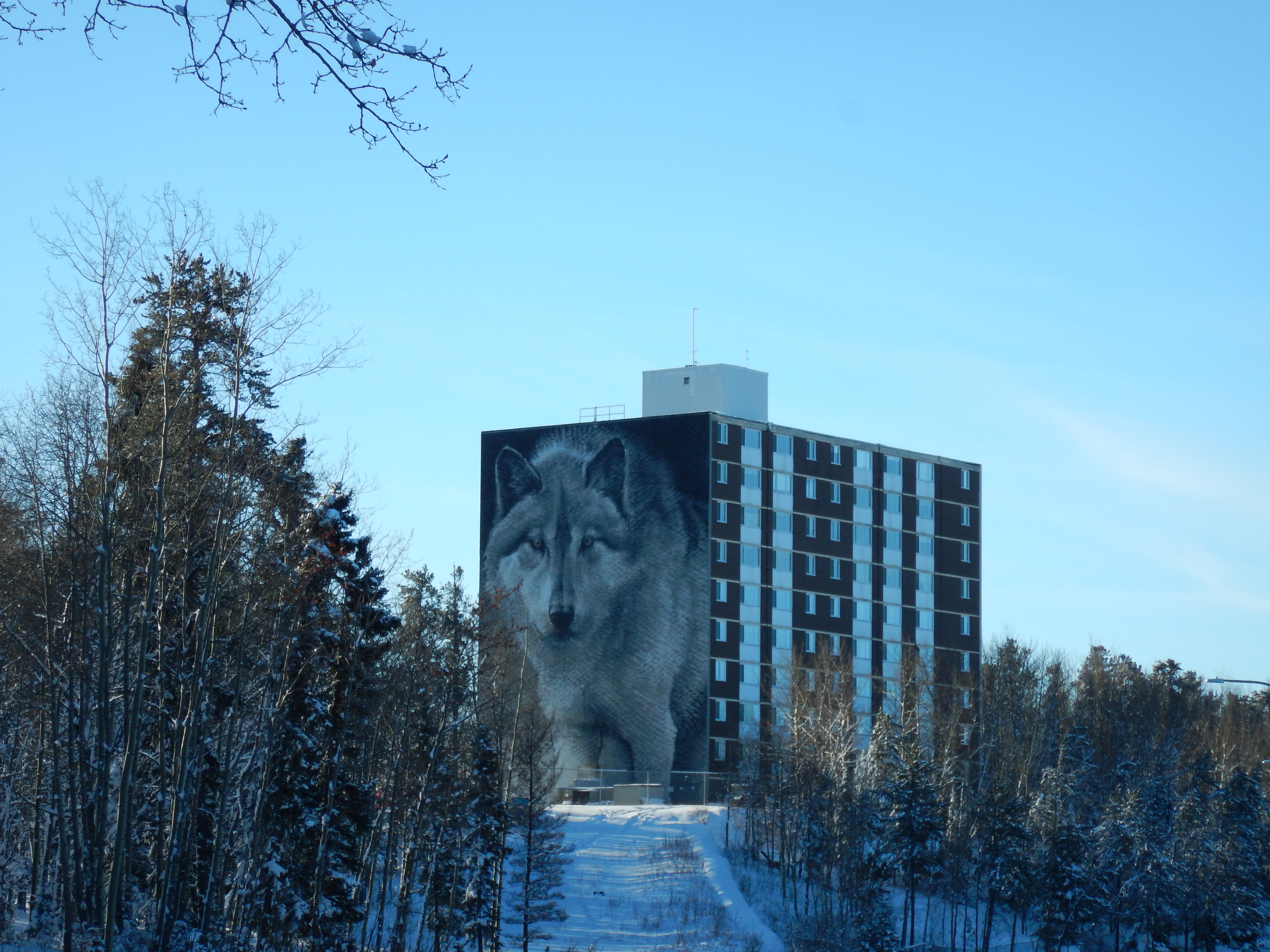
- Highland Tower, chosen for the Spirit Way wolf mural, is the most prominent building on Thompson's skyline
- Nicknames: "Hub of the North" or "Hub City, "The Centennial City", "Nickel City"
- City boundaries

- Location in Canada Location in Manitoba
- Coordinates: 55°44′36″N 97°51′19″W
- Country: Canada
- Province: Manitoba
- Region: Northern Region
- Census division: 22
- Established: 1956
- Incorporated: 1967 Town
- 1970 City

Government
  - City Mayor: Colleen Smook
  - Governing Body: Thompson City Council
  - MLA (Thompson): Eric Redhead (NDP)
  - MP (Churchill—Keewatinook Aski): Rebecca Chartrand (Liberal)

Area
  - Total: 16.62 km^{2} (6.42 sq mi)
- Elevation: 224.03 m (735.0 ft)

Population (2021 Census)
  - Total: 13,035 (6th)
  - Density: 784.31/km^{2} (2,031.4/sq mi)
- Demonym: Thompsonite
- Time zone: UTC−6 (CST)
  - Summer (DST): UTC−5 (CDT)
- Forward sortation area: R8N
- Area codes: 204, 431, 584
- Highways: PTH 6
- Website: www.thompson.ca

Thompson is a city in north-central Manitoba, Canada, the largest city and most populated municipality in Northern Manitoba.

Situated along the Burntwood River, Thompson is located 210 kilometres (130 mi) north of Lake Winnipeg and 761 km (473 mi) north of the City of Winnipeg. Originally founded in 1956 as a mining town, it is one of the largest fully planned communities in Canada. It now primarily serves as the "Hub of the North", providing goods and services such as health care and retail trade to the surrounding communities.

Thompson has fewer than 15,000 residents, with many of the smaller communities accessible only by air or winter road. Despite its isolated location in the heart of Canada's boreal forest, the city is served by an all-weather road and Manitoba Highway 6, Thompson station (served by the Winnipeg–Churchill train), and by the Thompson Airport.

Thompson's natural and undisturbed surroundings make it popular with outdoor enthusiasts. The largest marina in Manitoba is 38 km (24 mi) south in Paint Lake Provincial Park. The lack of light pollution and Thompson's northern latitude allows for occasional viewing of the northern lights, even within the city limits.

== History ==
The Thompson area, located on the south side of the Burntwood River, was first inhabited by nomadic Paleo-Indian hunters around 6000 BC, sometime after the collapse of the Laurentide Ice Sheet.

=== Founding ===
For a 10-year period beginning in 1946, Inco Limited explored Northern Manitoba for nickel deposits; on February 4, 1956, a major ore body was discovered 32 km (20 mi) southwest of Moak Lake, and the modern history of Thompson began.

On December 3, 1956, Inco and the Government of Manitoba reached agreement on developing the area. A town and a rail link with the Canadian National Railway had to be built. The town was founded in 1957, and was named after Dr. John F. Thompson (1881–1968), Inco's chairman at the time.

The construction of the fully planned city was completed by a workforce of several thousands in 1961, coinciding with the formal opening of the mine on March 25. It was the second largest nickel-producing operation in the world (after Inco's Sudbury operations).

New mines were opened during the 1960s, and the population topped 20,000, despite the townsite being designed for 8,000 to 12,000.

=== Incorporation ===
Thompson was incorporated as a town in 1967 on Canada's Centennial Anniversary. In 1970, Thompson gained city status in the royal presence of Queen Elizabeth II.

The community was initially planned for a population of 8000, but Thompson grew rapidly to 19,001 residents by the 1971 Census; the population has even been estimated as high as 26,000 residents at the time prior to the recession. However, major layoffs at Inco Limited in 1971 and 1977 led to Thompson's population declining to 14,288 by the 1981 Census.

Thompson's rapid boom and bust was attributed to changes in the nickel market; during the 1960s, following large increases in the demand for nickel, 6 additional mines (Birchtree, Soab North, Soab South, Pipe Number 1, Pipe Number 2, and Pipe Open Pit) were constructed near Thompson.

After the Soviet Union gained access to the world nickel market in 1970, world supply of nickel exceeded world demand; in response, four nickel mines (Soab North, Soab South, Pipe Number 1, and Pipe Number 2) were closed in 1971 and 30% of Inco's workforce in Thompson was laid off.

In 1977, when nickel prices declined substantially, a fifth mine (Birchtree) was put on care and maintenance and an additional 650 Inco employees in Thompson were laid off.

As Inco's workforce dwindled from over 4000 in the 1970s to around 850 in 2018, the economic driver of Thompson shifted to providing goods and services (e.g., retail, healthcare, social services) to the surrounding communities, earning Thompson the nickname, "The Hub of the North".

== Geography ==
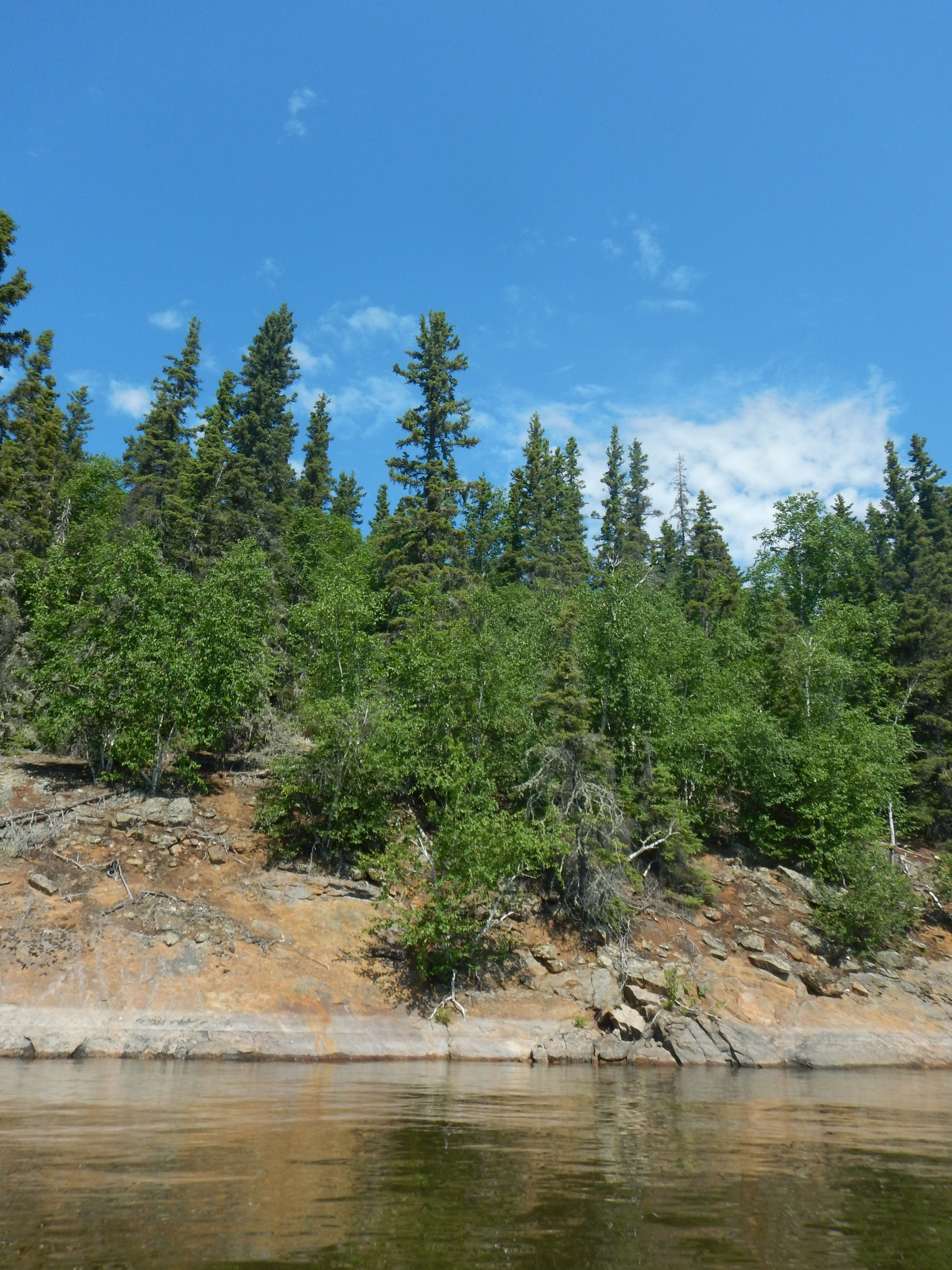
The soil on the Canadian Shield is relatively shallow but still supports large trees; rocky outcrops can be commonly found around Thompson, especially near lakes and rivers.

Thompson covers an area of 20.79 square kilometres (8.03 sq mi) and is located on the Precambrian Canadian Shield.

Situated along the Burntwood River, Thompson is located 210 kilometres (130 mi) north of Lake Winnipeg and 761 km (473 mi) north of the City of Winnipeg.

The city is surrounded by boreal forest and bordered on the west and north by the Burntwood River.

=== Ecology ===
==== Flora ====
Thompson is located on the border of plant hardiness zones 1a and 1b, making outdoor commercial agriculture impossible; for comparison, Winnipeg is located within zone 4a.

The dominant coniferous species are white spruce (Picea glauca), black spruce (Picea mariana), jack pine (Pinuus banksiana), tamarack (Larix laricina) and balsam fir (Abies balsamea). White birch (Betula papyrifera) is the most common deciduous species.

==== Fauna ====
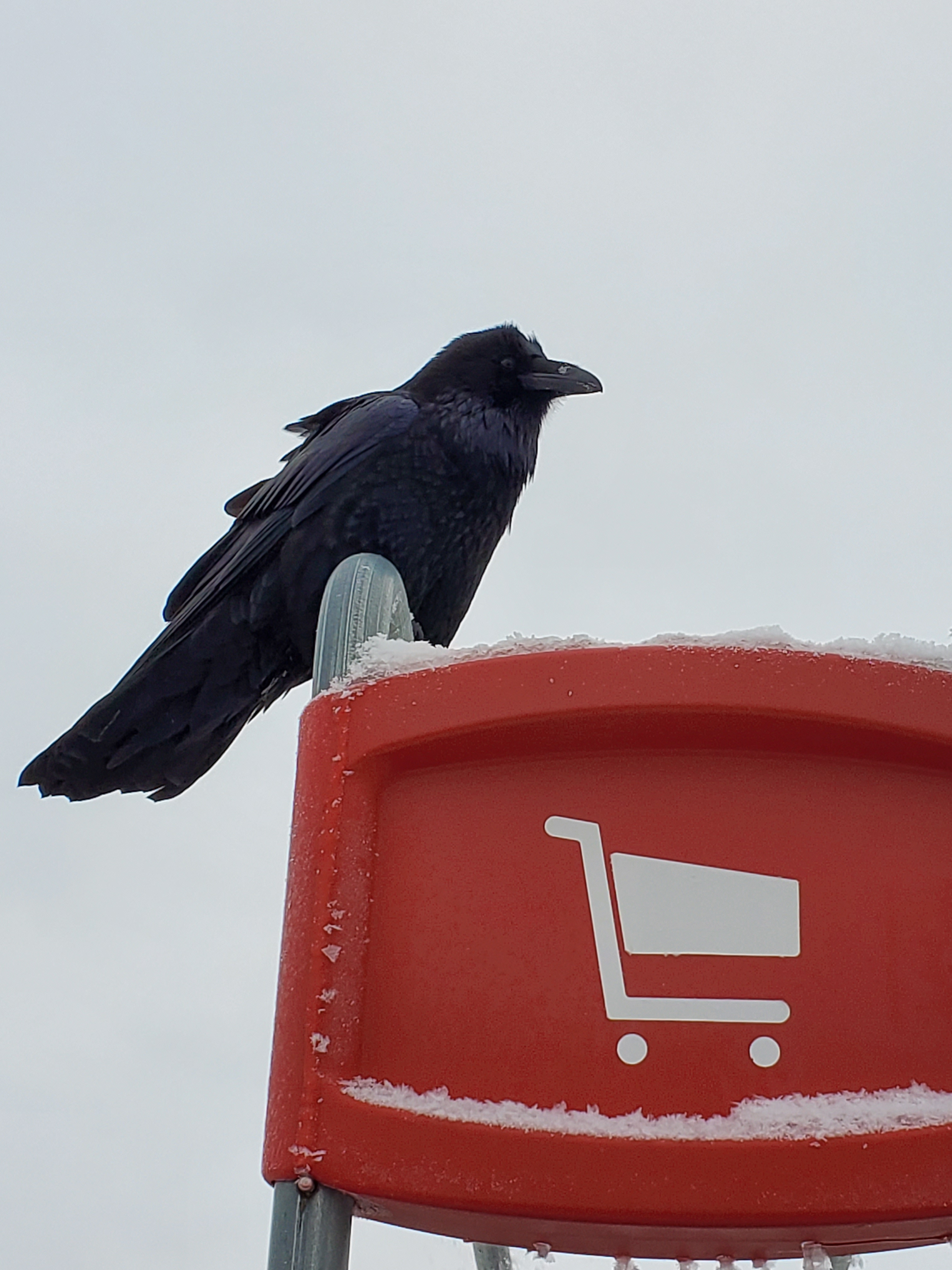
A large raven sitting on a shopping-cart-return-rack. Taken in Thompson, Manitoba, near the City Centre Mall (containing a Walmart and a Safeway), where a large number of ravens gather every day.

Hundreds of ravens (Corvus corax), known locally as "Thompson Turkeys", reside in Thompson year-round. Many bird species visit the Thompson area in the summer to breed, such as herring gulls (Larus smithsonianus), bald eagles (Haliaeetus leucocephalus), golden eagles (Aquila chrysaetos), sandhill cranes (Antigone canadensis), and common terns (Sterna hirundo).

Beavers (Castor canadensis) are ubiquitous around Thompson, with a few residing in the city limits. Red foxes (Vulpes vulpes) can also be found in Thompson. Black bears (Ursus americanus), and less commonly, wolves (Canis lupus), are occasionally spotted on the fringes of town. Moose (Alces alces) and herds of boreal woodland caribou (Rangifer tarandus caribou) can also occasionally be seen near Thompson. Rarely seen predators outside of Thompson include the marten (Martes americana), the wolverine (Gulo gulo), and the lynx (Lynx canadensis).

=== Climate ===
Thompson is marked by a subarctic climate (Köppen Dfc), with long, severely cold winters and short warm summers.

Monthly means range from −23.4 °C (−10.1 °F) in January to 16.2 °C (61.2 °F) in July, and the annual mean is −2.8 °C (27.0 °F). A majority of the annual precipitation of 521.5 millimetres (20.5 in) falls from June to September. Snowfall totals 180.3 centimetres (71 in) per year, falling mainly from October to May.

Climate data for Thompson Airport, 1991–2020 normals, extremes 1966–present
Month	Jan	Feb	Mar	Apr	May	Jun	Jul	Aug	Sep	Oct	Nov	Dec	Year
Record high °C (°F)	8.1 (46.6)	8.2 (46.8)	15.9 (60.6)	29.4 (84.9)	33.2 (91.8)	37.4 (99.3)	35.9 (96.6)	34.6 (94.3)	32.2 (90.0)	24.6 (76.3)	13.4 (56.1)	5.0 (41.0)	37.4 (99.3)
Mean daily maximum °C (°F)	−18.1 (−0.6)	−13.4 (7.9)	−5.3 (22.5)	4.7 (40.5)	12.9 (55.2)	20.2 (68.4)	23.1 (73.6)	21.2 (70.2)	14.2 (57.6)	4.3 (39.7)	−7.1 (19.2)	−15.5 (4.1)	3.4 (38.1)
Daily mean °C (°F)	−23.4 (−10.1)	−20.1 (−4.2)	−12.9 (8.8)	−2.5 (27.5)	6.0 (42.8)	12.9 (55.2)	16.2 (61.2)	14.5 (58.1)	8.2 (46.8)	0.2 (32.4)	−11.8 (10.8)	−20.6 (−5.1)	−2.8 (27.0)
Mean daily minimum °C (°F)	−28.7 (−19.7)	−26.8 (−16.2)	−20.4 (−4.7)	−9.6 (14.7)	−1.0 (30.2)	5.6 (42.1)	9.3 (48.7)	7.8 (46.0)	2.1 (35.8)	−4.0 (24.8)	−16.4 (2.5)	−25.7 (−14.3)	−9.0 (15.8)
Record low °C (°F)	−48.9 (−56.0)	−47.8 (−54.0)	−48.3 (−54.9)	−34.4 (−29.9)	−18.3 (−0.9)	−5.6 (21.9)	−3.1 (26.4)	−3.5 (25.7)	−11.1 (12.0)	−27.1 (−16.8)	−41.2 (−42.2)	−47.6 (−53.7)	−48.9 (−56.0)
Average precipitation mm (inches)	20.4 (0.80)	16.2 (0.64)	22.8 (0.90)	23.6 (0.93)	42.8 (1.69)	68.0 (2.68)	90.5 (3.56)	85.5 (3.37)	60.2 (2.37)	39.9 (1.57)	29.7 (1.17)	21.8 (0.86)	521.5 (20.53)
Average rainfall mm (inches)	0.0 (0.0)	0.2 (0.01)	1.6 (0.06)	5.4 (0.21)	36.4 (1.43)	66.9 (2.63)	90.5 (3.56)	86.4 (3.40)	58.6 (2.31)	18.5 (0.73)	1.1 (0.04)	0.3 (0.01)	365.9 (14.41)
Average snowfall cm (inches)	24.4 (9.6)	17.7 (7.0)	24.1 (9.5)	19.0 (7.5)	8.5 (3.3)	0.9 (0.4)	0.0 (0.0)	0.0 (0.0)	1.6 (0.6)	23.0 (9.1)	33.7 (13.3)	27.3 (10.7)	180.3 (71.0)
Average precipitation days (≥ 0.2 mm)	12.9	10.6	10.0	7.4	10.5	11.1	14.2	14.5	14.5	13.1	15.1	13.4	147.3
Average rainy days (≥ 0.2 mm)	0.2	0.4	1.0	2.9	8.7	11.1	14.2	14.4	13.9	6.9	1.3	0.4	75.4
Average snowy days (≥ 0.2 cm)	13.1	10.6	9.8	5.4	3.1	0.3	0.0	0.0	0.9	8.0	14.7	14.0	80.0
Mean monthly sunshine hours	96.6	120.6	172.3	224.9	258.6	268.8	278.4	253.3	144.2	92.5	63.5	66.6	2,040.3
Percentage possible sunshine	40.4	44.7	47.1	53.0	51.3	51.4	53.1	54.3	37.6	28.5	25.4	30.2	43.1
Source: Environment Canada (sun 1981–2010)

== Economy ==
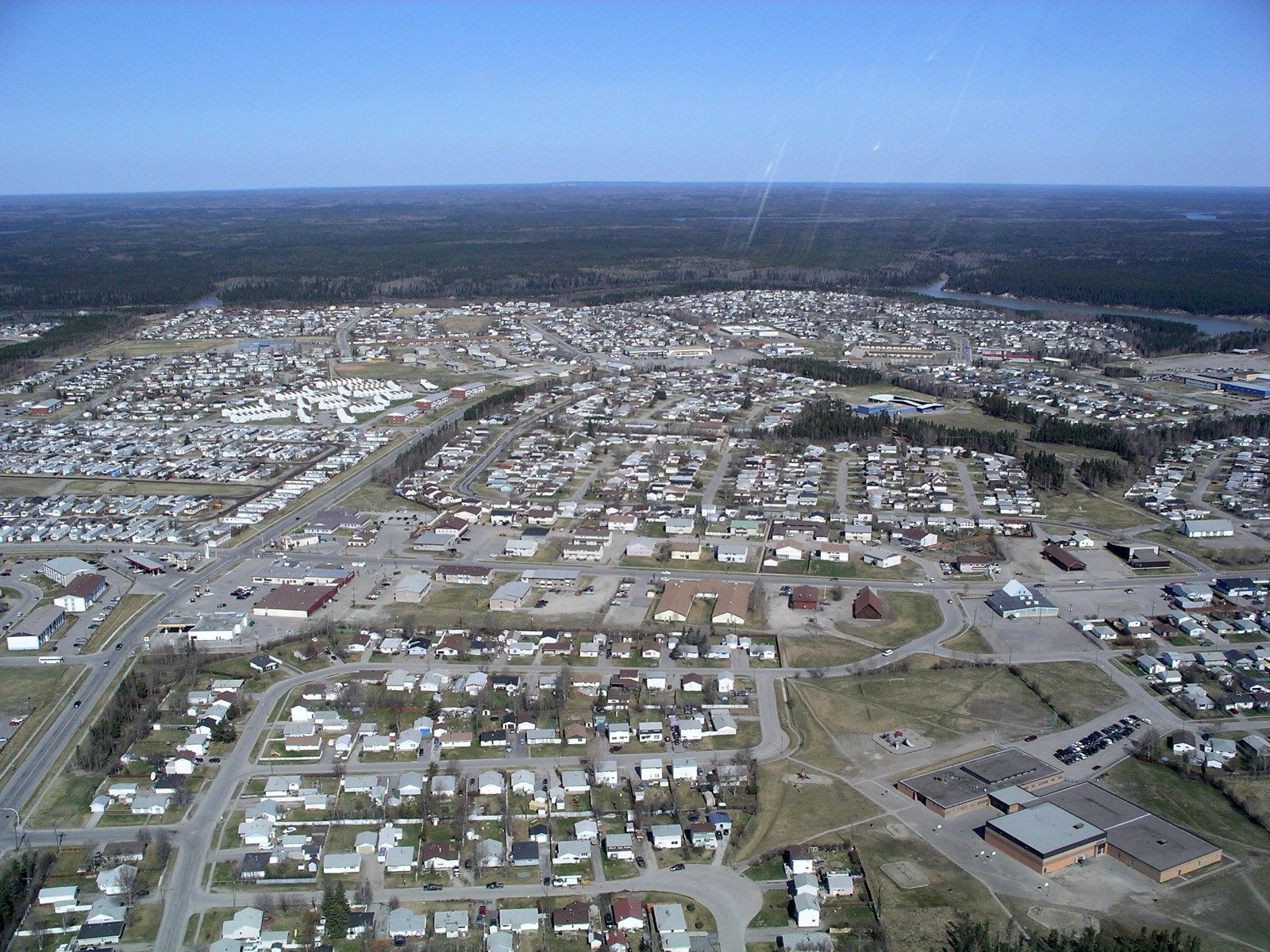
City of Thompson, looking West. The Burntwood River is visible at the edge of town.

The economy of Thompson is centred around nickel mining, and provides goods and services to the surrounding communities in both Census Division No. 22 (in which Thompson is located) and Census Division No. 23; these two Census Divisions have a combined population of 51,136, which includes over 38,000 First Nations people. Thompson is by far the largest community in either of these Census Divisions, with the next largest community being Norway House Cree Nation (population 4927).

As is common in resource-based communities, Thompson has experienced above-average employment income and significant swings in mining-sector employment throughout its history.

The median employment income in 2015 for full-year full-time workers in Thompson was $65,262; this was 22% higher than the Canadian median of $53,431. Thompson's unemployment rate in 2016 was 7.6%, slightly below the Canadian average of 7.7%.

As of the 2016 Census, Thompson had 7065 employed persons, with the five largest sectors of the economy being:

- mining (1255 employees)
- health care and social assistance (1100 employees)
- accommodation and food services (710 employees)
- educational services (710 employees)
- retail trade (670 employees)

=== Mining ===
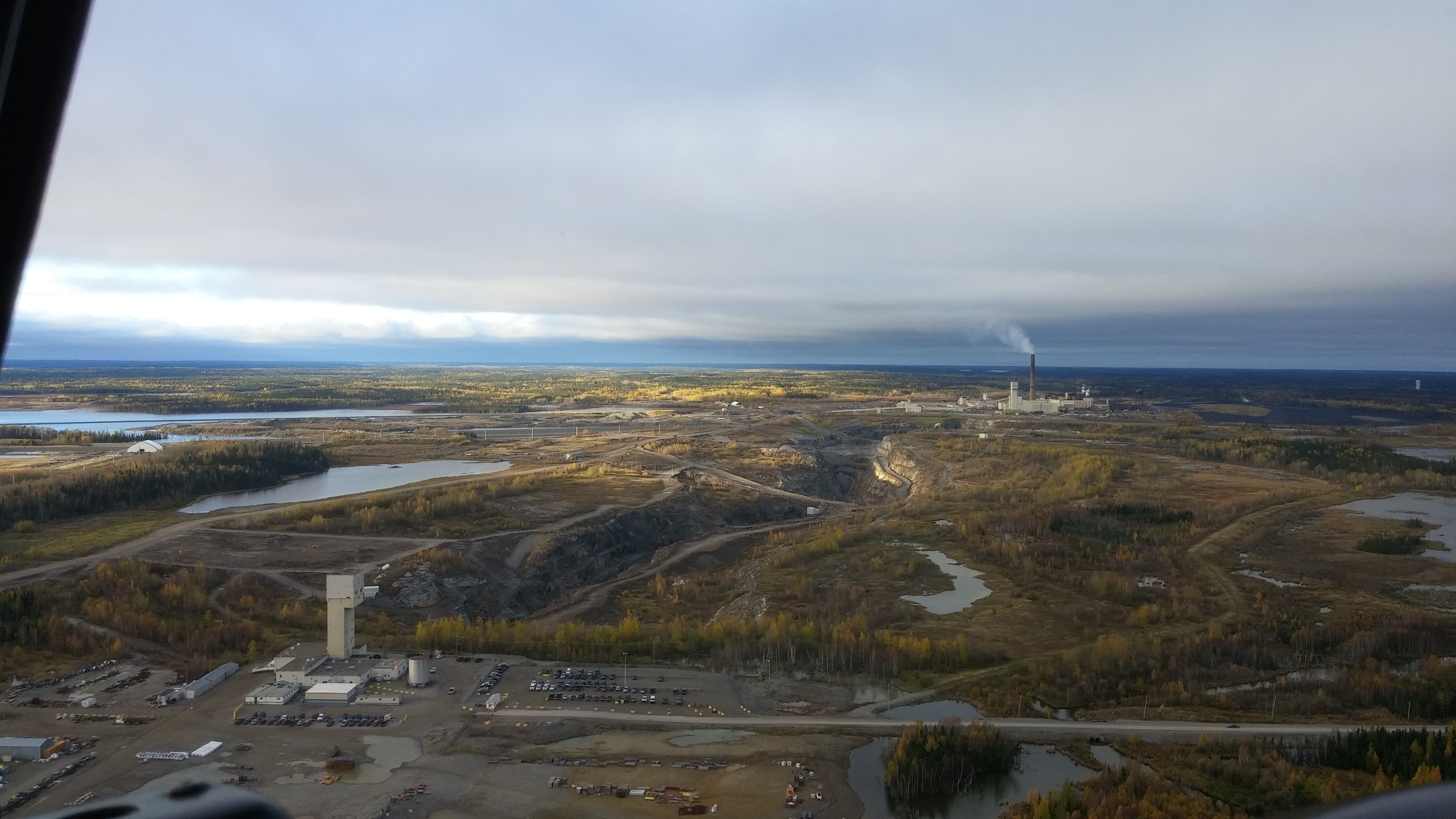
View of Thompson's mining operations. The (now decommissioned) smelter and refinery is visible in the middle of the image.

Vale Limited is the owner and operator of Thompson's mining operations, which involves the mining, milling, and concentrating of nickel; the concentrated nickel slurry is then shipped (for final processing) to Vale Limited's operations in Long Harbour and Sudbury.

Founded on a large and high-grade deposit of nickel, Thompson accounted for 11% of the world's finished nickel production in 1962, having produced over 40,800 metric tonnes of nickel that year; Thompson's nickel production peaked in 1970 and 1971 at over 60,000 metric tonnes (per year) and has since declined to 23,000 metric tonnes in 2017.

Despite the fact that Vale Limited's placed their nearby Birchtree Mine on care and maintenance (suspending nickel extraction at the mine for the time being), Thompson may be particularly well positioned for future growth in nickel mining industry: Vale recently invested over $100 million in the concentrate load out facility and Vale's North Atlantic mining operations director Alistair Ross recently stated that, "If you were to look across the world for an area that had nickel that could be invested in on a standalone nickel basis, there isn’t a better place [than Thompson]".

Between the 2016 Census and 2018, approximately 400 job losses have occurred in the mining industry.

Thompson-Area Mines	Years of Nickel Production
Thompson T1	1959–Present
Thompson T3	1959–Present
Birchtree	1966–1977 & 1989–2017
Soab North	1969–1971
Soab South	1969–1971
Pipe Number 1	1970–1971
Pipe Number 2	No significant production
Pipe Open Pit	1970–1985
Thompson Open Pit	1985–1995, 2002, & 2006

=== Other ===
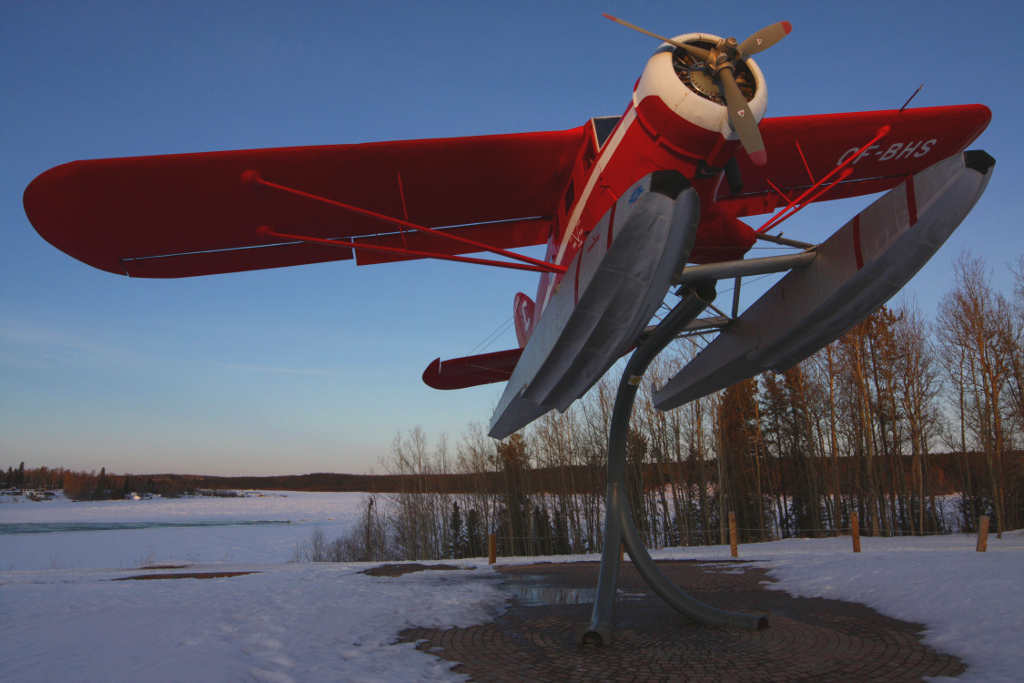
A Noorduyn Norseman attached to a display stand. Bush planes provide short-haul transport to the many lakes in the region.

The city is served by Thompson Airport, which is the third-busiest airport in Manitoba and provides Thompson with several hundred jobs.

MDS Aerotest currently operates the Global Aerospace Centre for Icing and Environmental Research (GLACIER), a cold weather testing centre just south of Thompson, as part of a joint venture between Pratt & Whitney Canada and Rolls-Royce. Thompson was selected from an initial list of 150 candidate communities due to the area's ideal testing conditions and urban amenities. Thompson's retail trade is centered mostly in several malls, including:

- City Centre Mall, which includes a Wal-Mart, Safeway, TD Canada, and Tim Hortons.
- Burntwood Plaza, which includes Shoppers Drug Mart and RBC Financial.
- Plaza Shopping Centre, which includes a Canadian Tire and Family Foods.
- Westwood Mall, which includes a Giant Tiger.

==== First Nations organizations ====
Thompson has several advocacy, non-profit, and administrative organizations focused around First Nations people, including Manitoba Keewatinowi Okimakanak Inc. (MKO), Awasis Agency of Northern Manitoba, Keewatin Tribal Council, and Ma-Mow-We-Tak Friendship Centre.

Twenty-four governments, businesses, and non-profit organizations are partners to the Thompson Aboriginal Accord, originally signed in 2009, outlining a common understanding towards equitable economic development and reconciliation.

== Amenities ==
Thompson primarily serves as the "Hub of the North", providing goods and services such as health care and retail trade to surrounding communities in Northern Manitoba.

=== Transportation ===
The city is served by road via an all-weather road, Manitoba Provincial Road 280, Manitoba Provincial Road 391, and Manitoba Highway 6; by rail via Thompson station, which is served by Via Rail's Winnipeg–Churchill train, which extends from Winnipeg, through The Pas, to Churchill; and by air via the Thompson Airport and Thompson Water Aerodrome.

The city is connected to Winnipeg via a paved highway (Highway 6), rail, and air.

Thompson Transit, the city's public transit agency, ended service in 2024.

=== Health care and social assistance ===
The Northern Regional Health Authority (Eastern Campus) provides health care services to most of the communities in Census Division No. 22 and Census Division No. 23; Thompson-based facilities include the Thompson General Hospital, Northern Spirit Manor (personal care home), the Thompson Clinic, and Hope North (centre for youth in crisis).

Addictions Foundation of Manitoba also has a facility located in Thompson.

=== Education ===
The School District of Mystery Lake provides K–12 education in Thompson, operating six elementary schools (Deerwood School, Burntwood School, Westwood School, École Riverside School, Juniper School, Wapanohk Community School) and one high school (R. D. Parker Collegiate). While primarily English, the district also offers a K–12 French immersion program, as well as a K–8 language education program in the Cree language at the Wapanohk Community School. Students can continue the French program at the high school, where there are also basic Cree courses in grades 9–12.

Since September 2009, the Franco-Manitoban School Division (DSFM), which services communities across Manitoba, has expanded to include one K–12 elementary school in Thompson, École Communautaire La Voie du Nord. Located on Weir Road near the site of the Norplex Pool Recreation Centre, the district allows children to receive instruction in French with peers in a Francophone culture.

The Frontier School Division, the largest school division in Canada by geographical area, has an area office in Thompson as well.

For post-secondary education, Thompson is home to one of the two main campuses of the University College of the North, as well as the University of Manitoba's Faculty of Social Work branch in the region.

The Northern Manitoba Sector Council provides essential skills and employment skills training to Northern Manitobans.

=== Attractions ===
The lack of light pollution and Thompson's northern latitude allows for occasional viewing of the northern lights, even within the city limits.

Recreational services in the city are mainly provided by the Thompson Regional Community Centre, which contains two indoor skating rinks, a large 6-sheet curling rink called the Burntwood Curling Club, a multi-sport gym, exercise facilities, and an indoor walking track. The two ice arenas attached to the community centre are:

- the CA Nesbitt Arena, the larger arena, which is home of the U18 Norman Northstars and the U15 Norman Northstars
- the Gordon Beard Arena

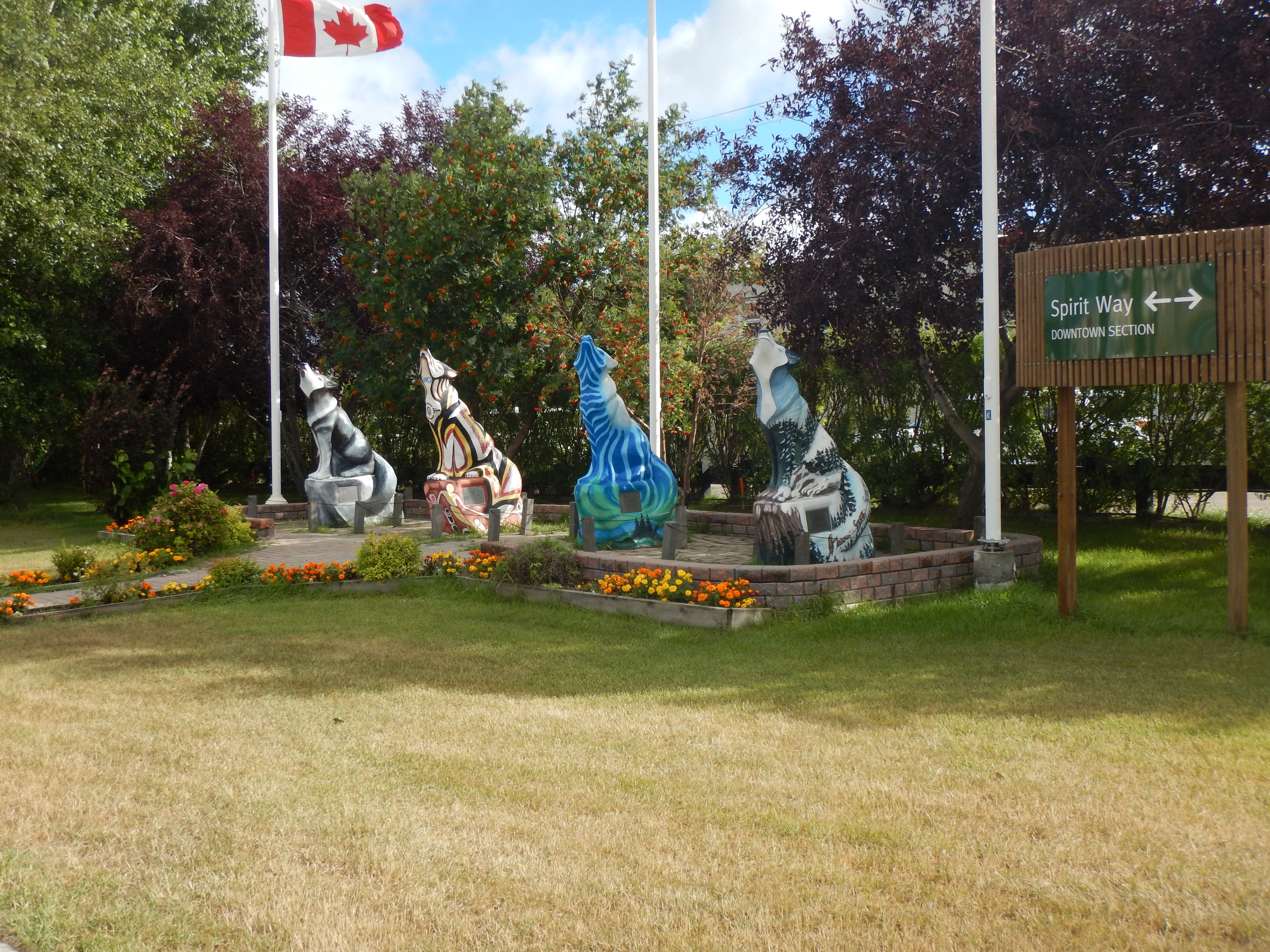
Start of the downtown section of Spirit Way, with 4 of the 56 Spirit Way Wolf statues.

Spirit Way is a 2 km (1.2 mi) walking and biking pathway with 16 points of interest that highlight Thompson's art, heritage, culture, industry, geology, and scenery; the pathway includes the largest photo-real mural in Canada and 56 painted wolf statues.

The Heritage North Museum offers the opportunity to see animals native to the area, a boreal forest diorama, First Nation and fur trade artifacts (including an authentic caribou hide tipi), fossils, and mining artifacts. The Museum consists of two log structures, an open-air blacksmith shop, Institutional Archives, and visitor information booth.

The Millennium Trail is a 15 km (9.3 mi) hike and bike loop around the city with sections that pass through the boreal forest. The crushed rock trail is open year-round to non-motorized travel. Walking, hiking and mountain biking are popular in the summer while walking and cross country skiing are winter favourites.

The city boasts at least two big festivals: Nickel Days, a large weekend festival held in June every year that includes concerts, family games, and a parade; and Winterfest, an annual multi-day celebration of northern culture and activities that is held in February.

==== Nearby attractions ====
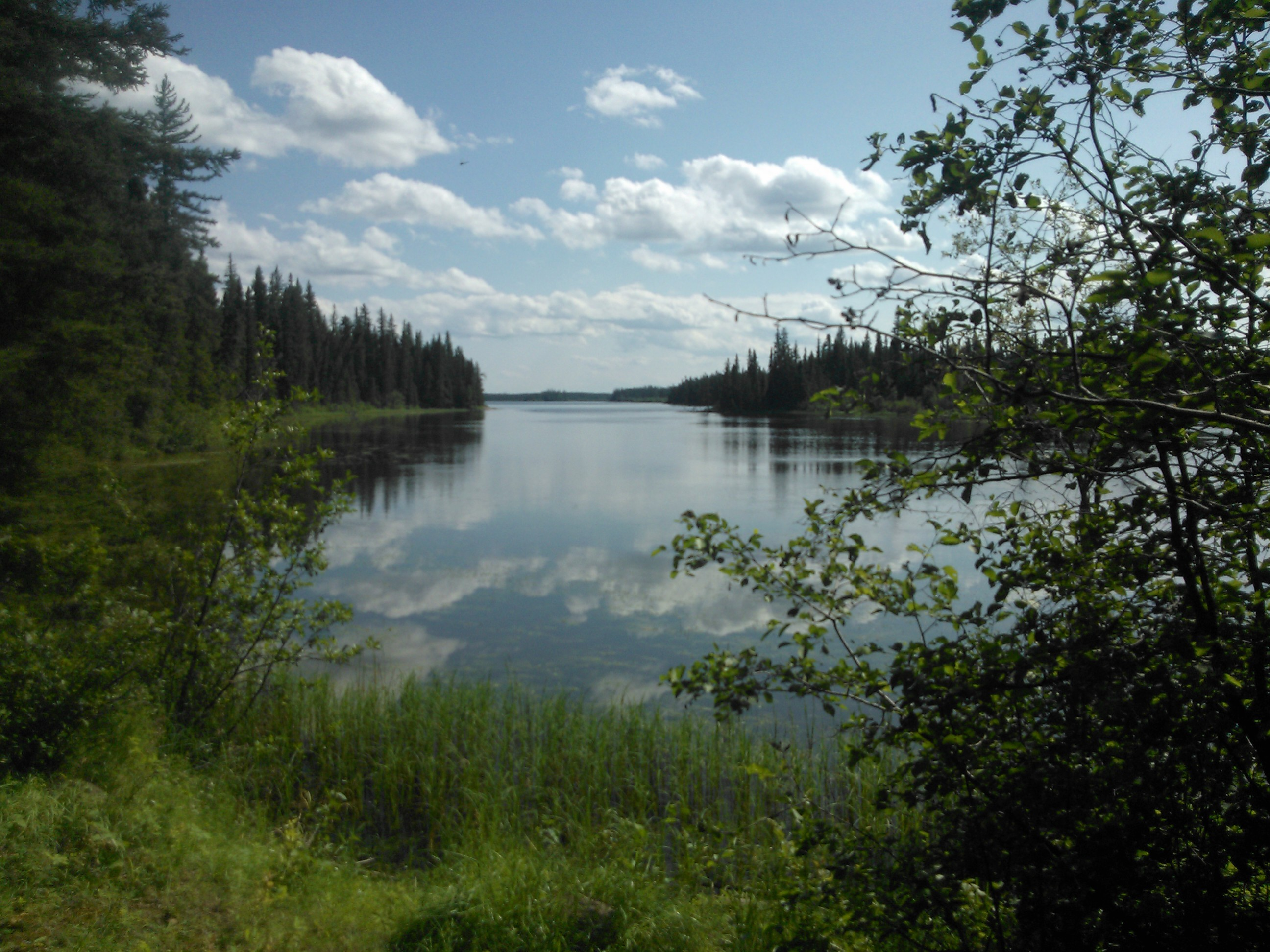
View of Grass River while hiking the Pisew Falls to Kwasitchewan Falls Trail

Paint Lake Provincial Park, located 32 km (20 mi) south of Thompson on Highway 6, spans over 23,000 hectares (56,000 acres) of Precambrian boreal forest, and houses the largest marina in Manitoba. The park has dozens of campsites and cabins for rent, and features boat launches, beaches, playgrounds, a volleyball court, baseball diamond, and fitness trail. In the winter, there are groomed snowmobile trails, ice skating, toboggan runs, ice fishing, and ice fishing derbies.

Pisew Falls Provincial Park, located 74 km (46 mi) south of Thompson on Highway 6, offers the chance to view Manitoba's 2 highest waterfalls. Pisew falls is viewable after taking a short 0.5 km (0.31 mi) trail that leads to a viewing platform (for taking pictures) of the 13-metre-high (43 ft), year-round falls. Kwasitchewan Falls, Manitoba's highest waterfall, is viewable after hiking an 11 km (6.8 mi) trail; this trail is a difficult back-country trail, recommended for experienced hikers only.

Sasagiu Rapids Provincial Park, located 79 km (49 mi) south of Thompson on Highway 6, is the site of scenic rapids, where visitors can rent off-road equipment (e.g., Ski-Doo, Sea-Doo), as well as campers and sites.

Mystery Mountain Winter Park, located 23 km (14 mi) north of Thompson on Provincial Road 280, offers downhill skiing, snowboarding, and cross-country skiing trails.

=== Sports ===
Thompson is home to the Norman Northstars hockey team, who play in the Manitoba U-18 'AAA' Hockey League. The city's minor hockey team is the Thompson King Miners.

The high school teams are called the R. D. Parker Collegiate Trojans, whose rivals are the Hapnot Kopper Kings from Flin Flon and the MBCI Spartans from The Pas.

Every year in April, students from the six elementary schools in grades 3–8 compete in the Knights of Columbus Track Meet.

=== Media ===
The Thompson Citizen (covering Thompson) and the Nickel Belt News (covering the area around Thompson) are the only local newspapers.

There are five radio stations: AM 610: CHTM (adult contemporary), FM 102.9: CHTM (adult contemporary), FM 96.3: CINC-FM (NCI), FM 99.9: CKSB-5 (Première Chaîne; repeats CKSB Winnipeg), and FM 100.9: CBWK (CBC Radio One).

Shaw Communications is the local cable television provider serving Thompson, and operates the local Shaw TV channel on cable channel 11.

== Demographics ==
Population census
Year	Pop.	±%
1971	19,001	—
1976	17,291	−9.0%
1981	14,288	−17.4%
1986	14,701	+2.9%
1991	14,977	+1.9%
1996	14,385	−4.0%
2001	13,256	−7.8%
2006	13,446	+1.4%
2011	13,123	−2.4%
2016	13,678	+4.2%
2021	13,035	−4.7%

In the 2021 Census of Population conducted by Statistics Canada, Thompson had a population of 13,035 living in 4,676 of its 5,442 total private dwellings, a change of −4.7% from its 2016 population of 13,678. With a land area of 16.62 km^{2} (6.42 sq mi), it had a population density of 784.3/km^{2} (2,031.3/sq mi) in 2021.

The number of residents fell substantially between 1971 and 1981, from 19,001 to 14,288 (a 24.8% decrease). Since then, Thompson's population has fluctuated between 13,000 and 15,000 people.

The most common mother tongues are English (81.3%), followed by Cree (5.2%), Punjabi (2.6%), and Gujarati (2.0%).

The median age in Thompson is 30.8 years old, significantly below Canada's median age of 41.0. For Thompson residents ages 25 to 34, 17.5% have not obtained a high-school diploma or equivalent, compared to 8.7% for Canada.

=== Ethnicity ===
In 2016, people with European ancestry (43.9%) made up a plurality of the population, followed closely by Aboriginals (43.5%), composed of First Nations (32.2%) and Metis (10.8%); the remainder of the population is made up of visible minorities (12.5%), with the largest two visible minorities being South Asian (7.5%) and Black (2.1%).

In 2016, Thompson has the highest percentage of its population as Aboriginal (43.5%) out of all 152 cities (census metropolitan areas and census agglomerations) in Canada.

Panethnic groups in the City of Thompson (2001−2021)
Panethnic group	2021		2016		2011		2006		2001	
Panethnic group	Pop.	%	Pop.	%	Pop.	%	Pop.	%	Pop.	%
Indigenous	5,865	45.52%	5,870	43.56%	4,475	35.15%	4,915	36.67%	4,510	34.1%
European (Note: Statistic includes all persons that did not make up part of a visible minority or an indigenous identity.)	5,065	39.31%	5,920	43.93%	7,365	57.86%	7,795	58.15%	8,300	62.76%
South Asian	1,195	9.27%	1,010	7.5%	440	3.46%	410	3.06%	155	1.17%
African	315	2.44%	280	2.08%	170	1.34%	130	0.97%	180	1.36%
Southeast Asian (Note: Statistic includes total responses of "Filipino" and "Southeast Asian" under visible minority section on census.)	195	1.51%	145	1.08%	145	1.14%	60	0.45%	25	0.19%
East Asian (Note: Statistic includes total responses of "Chinese", "Korean", and "Japanese" under visible minority section on census.)	90	0.7%	160	1.19%	50	0.39%	55	0.41%	55	0.42%
Latin American	65	0.5%	25	0.19%	20	0.16%	10	0.07%	0	0%
Middle Eastern (Note: Statistic includes total responses of "West Asian" and "Arab" under visible minority section on census.)	35	0.27%	35	0.26%	40	0.31%	15	0.11%	0	0%
Other/multiracial (Note: Statistic includes total responses of "Visible minority, n.i.e." and "Multiple visible minorities" under visible minority section on census.)	45	0.35%	50	0.37%	0	0%	20	0.15%	0	0%
Total responses	12,885	98.85%	13,475	98.52%	12,730	97.01%	13,405	99.7%	13,225	99.77%
Total population	13,035	100%	13,678	100%	13,123	100%	13,446	100%	13,256	100%
Note: Totals greater than 100% due to multiple origin responses

== Government ==
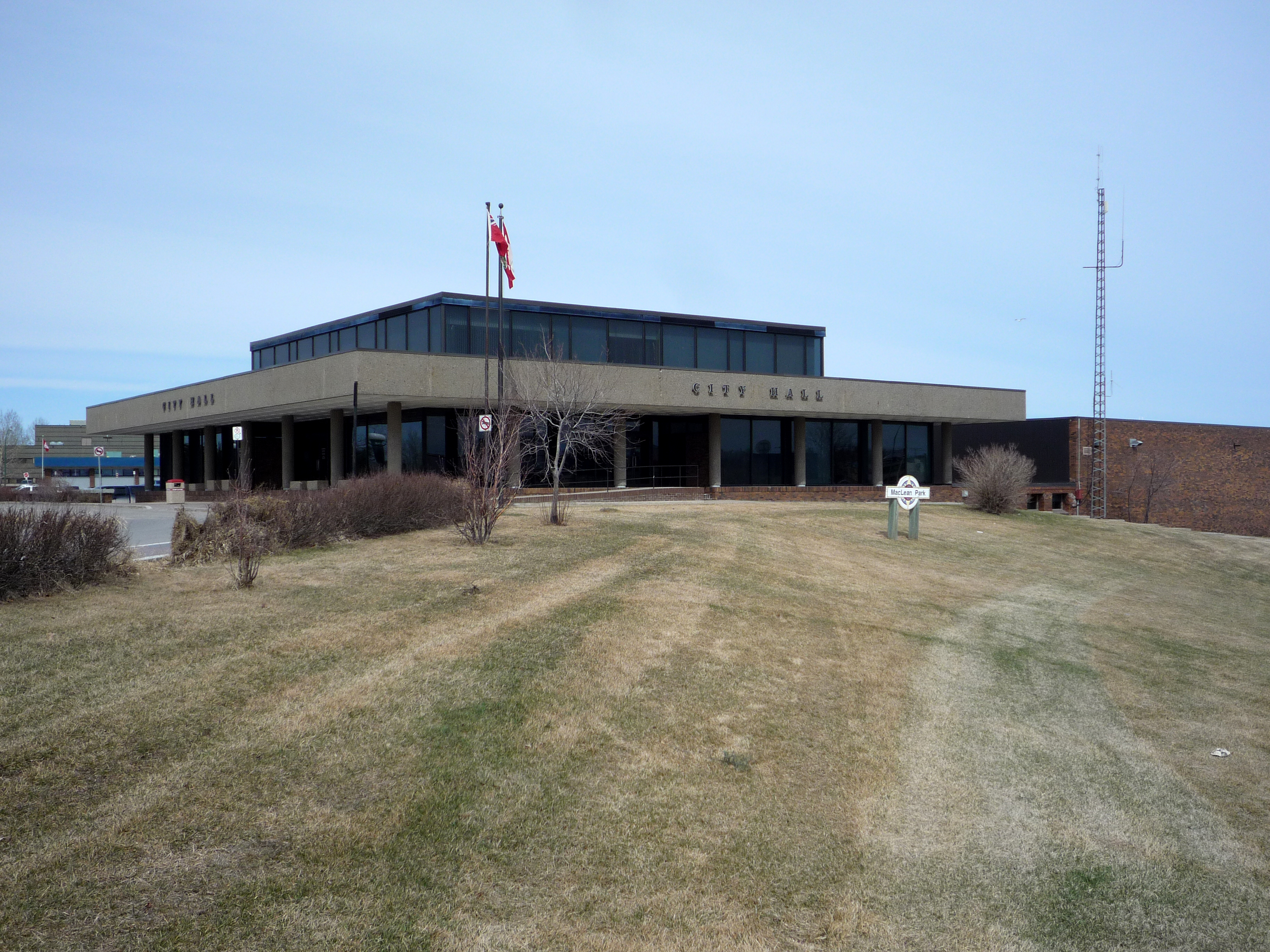
City Hall

The City of Thompson is governed by a city council consisting of 9 members: a mayor (head of council) and eight councillors; the structure and size of the municipal government is stipulated by The Thompson Charter Act. Elections are held every four years (in October) and members of city council serve four-year terms (without term limits).

After the 2022 election, the members of city council were: Colleen Smook (Mayor), Louis Fitzpatrick (Deputy Mayor) Brian Lundmark, Chiew Chong, Duncan Wong, Kathy Valentino, Joyce McIvor, Sandra Oberdorfer, and Oswald Sawh.

Thompson federal election results
Year	Liberal		Conservative		New Democratic		Green	
2021	21%	683	37%	1,227	32%	1,073	3%	94
2019	14%	605	33%	1,416	46%	1,973	5%	200

Thompson provincial election results
Year	New Democratic		PC		Liberal	
2019	44%	1,420	45%	1,465	4%	115
2016	34%	1,025	50%	1,503	16%	489

=== Crime and justice ===
Thompson is unique in being the judicial centre for a huge geographic area, ranging from Norway House in the south to Churchill in the north. The Thompson Judicial district covers 15 circuits and offers both Judicial Justice of the Peace Court as well as Provincial Court sittings. Judges, Judicial Justices of the Peace, Clerks, Crown Attorneys and defence lawyers based in Thompson and Winnipeg regularly travel by small plane on circuit court to various remote communities and First Nation Communities to hold Provincial court.

==== Crime ====
In both 2018 and 2019, Thompson was second on the Crime Severity Index of Canada.

To calculate the actual Crime Severity Index, the number of police-reported incidents for each offence is multiplied by the weight for that offence. All weighted offences are then added together and divided by the corresponding population total. Finally, to make the Index easier to interpret, the Index is standardized to "100" for Canada (a system that is similar to the Consumer Price Index), using 2006 as a base year.

For hub cities (e.g., Thompson), the Crime Severity Index likely over-represents the dangers of crime to the regular citizen. In 2018, the RCMP officer in charge of Thompson, Kevin Lewis, stated,

... Thompson is the hub of Northern Manitoba, which makes it a desirable place for drug trafficking, and other nefarious activities. This is a common theme for hub cities across Canada. Our proactive drug enforcement also provides an increase in the CSI, as cocaine trafficking is weighted heavily on the CSI. Disturbing the peace is similar to mischief where intoxication occurs in a public place, resulting in many violations due to the downtown core, again weighing heavily on our score.

Lewis also stated, "... Many of our mischiefs are related to intoxicated persons in a private residence or hotel room, but can also be used to capture damage to property. The mischief rate is high and when the weight is applied, it provides a high ratio for our CSI score.”

== Notable people ==
- Niki Ashton, politician
- Steve Ashton, politician
- Kelly Bindle, politician
- Rod Bruinooge, politician
- Jeremy Cumpston, doctor
- Brenda Davidson, curler
- Lorna deBlicquy, aviator
- Bev Desjarlais, politician
- Bob Desjarlais, labour leader
- Amelia Douglas, trapper
- Deven Green, performer
- Kaitlyn Jones, curler
- Tina Keeper, actress
- Curtis Leschyshyn, NHL player
- Cameron Mann, NHL player
- Lata Pada, dancer
- Tina Poitras, Olympic race walker
- Eric Redhead, politician
- Corey Redekop, writer
- Kate Rice, prospector
- Mario Santos, politician
- Jennifer Saunders, former Canadian women's racquetball champion
- Jody Shelley, NHL player
- Diana Swain, journalist
- Kevin Tkachuk, rugby player

== In pop culture ==
- The city was used in the Tragically Hip song "Thompson Girl". The song is both set in, and around Thompson, Manitoba, and is about the title character, a girl who dated the drummer for 2 years.
- "Thompson" is a song by Les Surveillantes, found on their album titled La racine carrée du coeur.
